= Chin theater =

Armed conflict in northwestern Myanmar

Chin Theater
- Part of the Myanmar civil war (2021–present) and the Myanmar conflict
- Location of Chin State within Myanmar
Date	April 2021 – present
Location	Chin State, Myanmar
Status	Ongoing
Territorial changes	State of Chinland declares sovereignty

Belligerents
Republic of the Union of Myanmar; Tatmadaw; Myanmar Army; North Western Command; Myanmar Air Force; Myanmar Police Force; Zomi Revolutionary Army	Chinland; Chin National Front; Chin National Army; Chin National Defence Force; Chinland Defense Force; Zoland Defence Force; Arakan Army; Anti-Fascist Internationalist Front

Strength
6+ infantry battalions in the State and other deployed troops	10,000 (CDF and CNF only)

Casualties and losses
900+ killed and several wounded^{as of July 2022}	53 killed and several wounded^{as of July 2022}

The Chin Theater is one of the theaters of the Myanmar civil war (2021–present), with resistance forces fighting against the Tatmadaw military junta in Chin State, western Myanmar.

== Background ==
Chin State is the least-developed region of Myanmar, located in the far west of the country, bordering India. It is home to the Chin peoples, a predominately Christian ethnic group.

Paletwa, situated in southern Chin State, has experienced conflict earlier than other towns in the region. Since 2019, the Arakan Army (AA) has engaged in multiple armed clashes with the Myanmar military, as part of the Conflict in Rakhine State (2016–present). During the conflict, the military imposed an internet shutdown in Paletwa, which has remained in effect since then.

== Prelude ==
After the 2021 Myanmar coup d'état, people from Chin State were particularly active in anti-coup protests. Days after the beginning of the 2021 Kalay clashes on 28 March 2021, resistance groups in Chin State formed the Chinland Defense Forces on 4 April 2021 to defend civilians from the Tatmadaw's violent crackdowns against protestors. Similarly, the Chin National Organization (CNO), along with its armed wing, the Chin National Defense Force (CNDF), was established on 13 April 2021.

== Timeline ==
=== 2021 ===
On 26 April 2021, the Battle of Mindat became the first large-scale conflict arising from the 2021 coup. As a response, the junta cut off food and water supplies and declared martial law. More than 10,000 people have left Mindat in southern Chin State as the Myanmar military started an all-out operation to quell an armed revolt headed by local citizens. Landmine and Cluster Munition Monitor reported that the Myanmar military used cluster munitions bombs in Mindat.

In late May 2021, the Chin-State based Chin National Front became the first ethnic armed organization to formally ally with the National Unity Government of Myanmar in the fight against the junta.

On 19 September 2021, clashes broke out in Thantlang when Chin National Army (CNA) and CDF-Thantlang launched an attack on a junta base, reportedly killing around 30 soldiers. In response, junta forces killed a Christian leader who tried to put out a fire. A month later, they returned and burned down two churches and at least 164 homes. The battle also leads to the exodus of thousands of residents as early as September 2021. Over 10,000 Thantlang residents fled the town, seeking refuge in the countryside and the neighboring Indian state of Mizoram.

CDF Paletwa carried out its first attack against junta soldiers in November 2021.

=== 2022 ===
In January 2022, tensions escalated between the military regime troops and the joint local forces (CNA, Chin National Defence Force, CDF Siyin, CDF KKG, PDF Zoland, PDF Kalay, Zomi PDF, Zogam Army) in Taingen village, Tedim, a strategic point on the road of Kalay-Tedim and Kalay-Falam, which also served as an entry point to Chin State from Sagaing. On 12 January, the junta's transportation units advanced to the village from Kalay to deliver military supplies to its troops. The next day, on 13 January, clashes broke out. The regime faced severe setbacks and fired heavy weapons from Kalay University while deploying air support. Consequently, over 1000 residents of Taingen and nearby villages, including Mualpi, Khai Kam, and Theizang, were displaced. The joint defense forces claimed an estimated 75 junta forces were killed. The battle lasted for over 10 days, and the joint forces eventually retreated due to inadequate weaponry.

As of May 2022, active fighting was taking place in eight of the nine townships of Chin State. In September 2022, the Chin National Army claimed that around 70% of the state was under the control of resistance forces.

By November 2022, much of Thantlang had been burned down.

=== 2023 ===
On 10 and 12 January 2023, Myanmar Air Force carried out airstrikes with one Yak-130 and two MiG-29 targeting Camp Victoria, CNA's headquarters, near the India-Myanmar border. Five CNA soldiers were killed, at least 10 were injured, and some buildings were damaged. The air attacks violated Indian airspace and soil, according to the CNF, local Mizo organizations, and the international research and advocacy organization Fortify Rights. The Chin Human Rights Organization (CHRO) states that at least 200 Chin refugees crossed the border later the week following the airstrikes by Myanmar Army.

CDF Matupi engaged in attacks near Paletwa Township. On 23 and 24 March 2023, CDF Matupi and CNA attacked junta's convoy on the Matupi-Paletwa road, and claimed 13 soldiers were killed. CDF Paletwa assured that on 15 March 2023, Assam Rifles entered Paletwa township and fired gunshots. However, the Assam Rifles denied, saying its soldiers were engaged in “routine border point verification inside the Indian territory."

On 10 April 2023, Webula town, situated about 20 miles away from Falam town experienced an attack by Myanmar Air Force. The attack followed the seizure of the Var military camp by the CNDF earlier that day. The town was targeted along with Var village and Kyaung Hel village. This assault resulted in the deaths of at least nine civilians, while many others sustained injuries due to the airstrikes. Among the casualties were individuals near a school and a football field where fighter jet shells exploded. The airstrikes caused extensive damage to five civilian houses.

In May 2023, the first clash in Paletwa after the coup broke out between AA and the Myanmar military.

More than 100 battles had occurred in Chin State between July and November 2022, reported The Diplomat. The conflict between AA and the Myanmar military ended in Paletwa after both parties agreed to a temporary cease-fire with Yōhei Sasakawa's intermediary.

The first clash in Tonzang, located in northern Chin State, took place on 1 August 2023. The CDFs (CDF Hualngoram, Tonzang CDF, and PDA), along with the CNA, attacked Tonzang Police Station. The fight continued until 2 August and resulted in the death of one CDF soldier and a civilian man, forcing nearby residents to flee.

On 14 November 2023, the Arakan Army-Tatmadaw ceasefire was breached after the AA, along with its alliance, launched the Operation 1027. The Arakan Army attacked the military's outposts in Paletwa township, and the military deployed air strikes and heavy artillery fire, leading to ongoing and intense fighting.

On the morning of 13 November 2023, after two days of fighting, the Chin National Army and the local CDFs forces seized the Myanmar Army's border guard outpost in Rikhawdar, Falam Township, a hub for border trade with India. The junta responded with air assaults using a jet fighter. Al Jazeera reported more than 5000 people from Rihkhawdar and nearby villages fled to Mizoram, India. A total of 43 Myanmar soldiers crossed the India-Myanmar border and sought refuge from the Indian police. They were handed to the Myanmar officials by the Indian authorities through Moreh-Tamu border. Two days later, residents who had fled to India returned, marking the town as the first in Chin State under the control of the resistance forces.

On 15 November 2023, the Chin National Defence Force (CNDF), the armed wing of the Chin National Organization (CNO), a Chin nationalist political organization, captured a Myanmar Military camp at Tibual village near the border with Mizoram, India. This action led to 29 Myanmar soldiers fleeing towards the neighboring Indian state of Mizoram. On the same day, eleven civilians, including eight children, were killed in a Myanmar Air Force airstrike in Vuilu village of Matupi Township, Southern Chin State. After the attack, the junta cut off mobile phone communications. Residents reported that there was no battle and CDF Matupi claimed that the attack deliberately targeted civilians.

=== 2024 ===
On 12 January 2024, the junta base at Taingen was attacked by the CNA, Civic Defense Militia, and the CDF. The base was being defended by 12 soldiers and 18 police officers. Fighting lasted for five days until 16 January, and involved junta forces shelling and using airstrikes against the attacking EAOs from their position in Kalay. The EAOs, however, killed the majority of the junta forces using drone bombs. According to Salai Lian Bawi, spokesman of the Chin National Front, the joint Chin force had repeatedly phoned the junta forces to surrender, however they refused and all died. Casualties on the Chin's side were a total of eight - one for the CNA, and seven for the CDF. The joint force also suffered the loss of four drones, each worth around 90 million kyat.

After launching an offensive on the town in December 2023, the Chin Brotherhood Alliance (CBA), with aid from other Chin groups and the Arakan Army, captured the strategic town of Kyindwe in southern Chin State on 2 May. On 16 May, several Chin resistance groups, including the CBA member Zoland Defense Force, launched an offensive to capture Tonzang from the junta and its allied Zomi Revolutionary Army. By 20 May, Chin resistance captured most of Tonzang and neighboring Cikha from the junta. The next day, Chin resistance captured all of Tonzang and began pursuing retreating junta soldiers. On 27 May, the Chin Brotherhood Alliance launched an offensive to capture neighboring Tedim, capturing a junta base the following day. On 30 May, CDF-Matupi captured the township's district administrative office on the Matupi-Hakha road.

On 31 May, the Daai Local Council announced that local defense forces in Kanpetlet, Matupi, Mindat, and Paletwa Township's had agreed to form the Chinland Defence Force – Daai. The council also stated that the 4 townships would be united into 1 administrative area under its governance, and that a constitution for the Daai Chin would be written.

In May 2024, hostilities erupted between the Zomi Revolutionary Army and Chin National Army in Tedim Township, Chin State, leading to significant concerns within the community. Recognizing the detrimental impact of such conflicts on the broader resistance movement, ZORO intervened to broker peace. By late May, Zo Reunification Organization (ZORO) had successfully initiated reconciliation efforts between the ZRA's Eastern Command and the CNA, aiming to establish a ceasefire and promote unity among the Zo people.

On 9 June, the Chin Brotherhood Alliance, alongside the Arakan Army and the Magway-based Yaw Army, began attacking Matupi. 4 days later, Chin resistance officially announced the beginning of "Operation Chin Brotherhood" to capture the town. The same day, Chin resistance announced that they had captured the town's police station and administrative offices, leading junta forces to retreat to bases north and south of the town. On 16 June, junta forces from Tedim launched an offensive to recapture positions along the Tedim-Kalay road, recapturing Kennedy Peak from the Zomi Federal Union by 18 June. After the outpost's capture, junta forces began launching raids on surrounding villages. On 20 June, junta forces recaptured the strategically important Taingen village. Both Kennedy Peak and Taingen village were recaptured by Chinland Council-led forces by 27 June, with junta forces retreating to Khaing Kham.

On 17 June, as part of Operation Chin Brotherhood, CBA forces and allies captured the 304th Light Infantry Battalion base outside of Matupi, 1 of 2 remaining bases surrounding Matupi. The same day while attempting to capture the 2nd base, belonging to the 140th Infantry Battalion, CBA forces detained a Chin National Army soldier driving close to the frontline, and planned to release him the following day. However, in the early morning of the next day, the Chin National Army and allies launched a surprise attack on the CBA, leading to 2 CBA deaths. On 24 June, during clashes between the Chin Council and Chin Brotherhood Alliance around Matupi, the Chin Council was forced to retreat from the Matupi area. On the same day, the Chinland Defense Force clashed with junta forces outside of the Chin State capital Hakha. The junta retaliated by setting fires to homes in the town. On 29 June, the CBA captured the 140th Infantry Battalion base north of Matupi and consequently seized the entire town.

On 7 July, the CNA detained 2 Yaw Defense Force (YDF) soldiers in Gangaw Township for "temporary questioning", taking the detainees to Camp Victoria (80 miles/129 kilometres away). The next day, the YDF closed the Hakha-Gangaw road. The detained soldiers were released on 12 July.

On 12 July, the Daai Regional Council and its armed forces, the CDF-Daai, resigned from the Chinland Council to prioritise the "consolidation" of the Daai people. On 20 July, as part of "Operation Rung", the CDF-Hakha captured the Hakha Main Police Station, releasing 62 detainees. On 22 July, the CNA and allies launched an offensive on the remaining junta bases in Thantlang, quickly capturing several bases on the Thantlang-Hakha road. On 27 July, the CNA and Zomi Revolutionary Army (ZRA) met in Aizawl for peace negotiations. On 5 August, the CNA captured the final junta base in Thantlang, warning the remaining junta soldiers in the town to surrender.

In September 2024, ZORO organized a meeting in Mizoram, bringing together representatives from both the CNA and the CB. The discussions culminated in a preliminary peace agreement, with both parties committing to resolve disputes non-violently and to collaborate more closely in their resistance against the Myanmar junta.

On 15 October 2024, an internationalist group called the Anti-Fascist Internationalist Front formed to aid Chin anti-junta forces. A co-founder, adopting the nom de guerre Azad, was a Kurdish volunteer in the Syrian Rojava conflict.

On 9 November, the CBA relaunched Operation Chin Brotherhood, launching simultaneous offensives on Falam and Mindat, capturing most of the former.

The military junta has announced plans to conduct elections in November 2025, with a phased approach due to security concerns. Preparations include a census scheduled for October 2024. However, resistance forces and civil society organizations in Chin State express skepticism about the legitimacy of these elections, viewing them as a strategy for the military to maintain power. They argue that the elections are unlikely to lead to meaningful change, especially given the junta's limited control over the region.

In early December 2024, insurgent forces, including the Chin National Army (CNA) and the CDF, captured four military camps between Hakha and Thantlang after ten days of combat. This offensive resulted in the deaths of 15 junta soldiers, including two captains and a police major, and the capture of 31 soldiers. The camps seized were Thi Myit, Umpu Puaknak, Nawn Thlawk Bo, and Ruavazung.

As of 23 December 2024, ethnic rebel groups asserted control over approximately 85% of Chin State. The Chin Brotherhood Alliance (CBA) reported control of Mindat, Matup, and Kanpetlet townships, while the Chinland Defense Force (CDF) holds Tonzang. Additionally, the Arakan Army (AA) controls Paletwa township. Tidim, Thantlang, Hakha, and Falam remained under junta control, though the CBA had initiated offensives in these areas, particularly targeting Falam.

=== 2025 ===
Military situation in Myanmar as of 12 August 2026

On 3 April 2025, the Zomi Revolutionary Army (ZRA) launched an attack against the joint forces of the Chinland Council in Tonzang Township, burning down around 80 homes in Nakzang village.

On 7 April, the Chin Brotherhood completed their capture of Falam after a five-month battle.

On 2 July 2025, fighting reportedly broke out between the Chin National Defence Force (CNDF) and the Hualngoram Chinland Defence Force (CDF) in the Hualngoram region of Chin State's Falam Township. Hualngoram CDF accused the CNDF of entering their territory and initiating drone attacks, while the CNDF claimed Hualngoram CDF opened fire on their members. The Chinland Council, with which CDF Hualngoram is affiliated, has called for de-escalation, emphasizing reconciliation between Chin resistance factions. Conversely, the Chin Brotherhood, allied with the CNDF, also expressed a desire for de-escalation but stated they would intervene to defend the CNDF if what they consider "outsider revolutionary forces," implicitly referring to the Chinland Council, interfere.

=== 2026 ===
On 25 April 2026, the Tatmadaw recaptured Falam from the Chin Defence Force.

On 5 May 2026, Kennedy Peak was recaptured by junta forces, following clashes with Chin resistance fighters.

On 19 May 2026, after a three-day battle, the Tatmadaw and Zomi Revolutionary Army recaptured Tonzang Township, gaining control over northern Chin State.

== Infighting between resistance groups ==
The Chin resistance has mostly fought as a united front since the outbreak of the civil war. However, in December 2023, the revolutionary forces became splintered into two factions, the Chinland Council and the Chin Brotherhood Alliance, the former operating in northern and central Chin State and the latter operating in the south. Among the several issues of contention between the groups is the role of the Arakan Army, which has increased its presence in southern Chin State since its capture of Paletwa Township in November 2023. The Chin Brotherhood Alliance has conducted operations openly with the Arakan Army in southern Chin, considering them a vital ally against the junta. In turn, the Chinland Council accused the Brotherhood of being an AA proxy, and the AA of encroaching on Chin territory.

On 31 January 2024, an alliance of 7 Chinland Defence Forces, alongside the Chin National Army (CNA), launched an offensive on Chin Brotherhood Alliance member the Maraland Defence Force after the MDF reportedly killed a CNA soldier and detained several CDF-Mara soldiers.

In late May, 2 rival Mara groups, the Maraland Territorial Council and Chinland Defense Force - Mara, met in Siaha district to discuss peace and unification. Prisoners held by both groups were released the next month.

On 10 June, the Chinland Council issued a statement asking the Arakan Army to refrain from military and administrative operations in Chinland. This came days after Global Khumi Organisation urged the Arakan Army against committing human rights violations against the Khumi Chin people of Paletwa Township.

In addition to these internal conflicts, tensions have escalated between the Zomi Revolutionary Army (ZRA) and the CNA. The ZRA, an armed Zomi nationalist group formed in 1997, has been involved in several clashes with Chin resistance forces. In September 2023, the ZRA attacked Chin resistance camps in Tonzang Township, resulting in the deaths of two CDF fighters. Further confrontations occurred in May 2024, with battles reported between the ZRA and CNA in Tedim Township. These incidents have exacerbated divisions within the Chin resistance, complicating efforts to present a cohesive front against the junta. The ZRA has been accused of collaborating with Myanmar's military junta, which the ZRA denies, further straining relations with other resistance groups.

On 11 July, the MDF and AA advanced into Lailenpi, capturing the town from the rival CDF-Mara and CNA.

In August, a meeting to resolve the dispute between the Chinland Council and the Chin Brotherhood Alliance was scheduled to take place in Delhi. However, the meeting was postponed, reportedly due to security concerns.

== Potential peace between resistance groups and Zo unification ==
In recent years, the possibility of Zo Unification, following the Myanmar Conflict has gained increasing traction in Mizoram. In 2024, the Zo Reunification Organisation (ZORO), established in 1988, played a pivotal role in facilitating peace talks among various ethnic resistance groups in Chin State, Myanmar, with a focus on achieving Zo unity.

The organization, that is based in Mizoram has been central in facilitating dialogue between groups such as the Chin National Army (CNA), the Zomi Revolutionary Army (ZRA), and the Chin Brotherhood Alliance (CBA), focusing on resolving internal conflicts and strengthening unity against the Myanmar military junta. ZORO’s initiatives have included organizing peace talks, ceasefires, and reconciliation efforts to reduce divisions within the resistance movements.

Additionally, the ex-Mizoram Chief Minister Zoramthanga has actively supported peacebuilding efforts among the Zo people, emphasizing their shared cultural and political ties across national borders. His administration has provided platforms for discussions and facilitated diplomatic engagement between Mizoram-based groups and resistance factions in Myanmar. For instance, Zoramthanga has expressed his commitment to helping resolve conflicts in Chin State and supporting the broader goal of Zo unification.

In November 2024, the current Chief Minister of Mizoram, Lalduhoma, during a visit to the United States, Lalduhoma emphasized the importance of unifying the Chin-Kuki-Mizo-Zomi communities. He advocated for the consolidation of these communities under a single administration, highlighting their shared cultural and religious ties.

In September 2024, Mizoram Chief Minister Lalduhoma appealed for closer ties between the Chin and Arakanese communities, advocating for cooperation with the Arakan Army (AA) in the broader context of the Myanmar conflict. He argued that building a relationship with the AA was necessary to prevent further instability in the region, suggesting that the Myanmar military junta would benefit from division among the ethnic groups. Lalduhma had stated:

“The military council will be happy if we are fighting each other. So, we must make friends with the AA, otherwise, it might even come to Lawngtlai and create trouble.”

However, this stance was rejected by Sui Khar, a leader of the Chin National Front (CNF) and the Chin National Army (CNA). He argued that the strength of the Arakan Army should not influence the decisions of ethnic groups or the Mizoram government. Khar emphasized that the Chin people would not work with the AA, as moral and ethical considerations, rather than power dynamics, should guide their actions. He asserted that "might cannot decide it," reiterating the Chin resistance's stance of non-cooperation with the AA despite both groups fighting the junta.

== Landmine injury of an American journalist ==
On 18 November 2025, an American journalist, Collin Mayfield, was injured in a landmine explosion while reporting in Myanmar’s Chin State. The incident occurred in the Tedim Township area, where the journalist was reporting on the conditions amid the ongoing conflict in the region. According to local reports, the explosion caused serious injuries, including damage to the journalist’s leg.

Following the blast, the journalist was evacuated from Myanmar to the Indian state of Mizoram for medical treatment. Authorities confirmed that the journalist was admitted to a hospital in Aizawl, where surgery was performed. Medical officials later stated that the journalist was in stable condition and continued to receive treatment.

The incident highlighted the risks faced by journalists operating in conflict-affected areas of Myanmar, particularly in regions contaminated by landmines and unexploded ordnance from ongoing hostilities.

== See also ==
- Anyar theater
- Rakhine offensive (2023-present)

== Bibliography ==
- Mühlhaus, Karl-Hermann; Lee, Peter K. H. (2025). Christian Theology in Myanmar. Erlanger Verlag. ISBN 9783872146434.
- Ye Myo Hein (May 2022). "One Year On: The Momentum of Myanmar's Armed Rebellion" (PDF). Woodrow Wilson International Center for Scholars. Archived from the original (PDF) on 2 April 2024.
