= Operation Chin Brotherhood =

- Part of the Chin theater of the Myanmar civil war (2021–present)
| Date | 9 June 2024 – present |
| Location | Chin State, Myanmar |
| Result | Ongoing |

Belligerents
| State Administration Council; Tatmadaw; Myanmar Army; Northwestern Command; Myanmar Police Force | Chin Brotherhood Alliance: Arakan Army; People's Defence Force; Yaw Army |

Commanders and leaders
| Unknown | Unknown |

Units involved
| Tatmadaw: Myanmar Army; Myanmar Police Force; Pyusawhti militia | Chinland Defense Force; Chin National Defence Force; Local PDFs |

Strength
| 400+ | Unknown |

In June 2024, the Chin Brotherhood Alliance, a military alliance of several Chin ethnic organisations, launched Operation Chin Brotherhood, shortened to Operation CB, an operation to capture regions which the CBA is active in. This operation has been aided by several non-Chin groups, notably the Rakhine-led Arakan Army and the Magway Region-based Yaw Army.

During the offensives, five town's have been captured by the CBA: Matupi, Lailenpi, Mindat, Kanpetlet, and Falam.

== Preceding offensives ==
Before the launch of Operation CB, the CBA launched several other offensives. On 22 December 2023, the CBA began an offensive on the strategically important town of Kyindwe, Kanpetlet Township, planning to capture the town by Christmas. After intensifying operations in March 2024, the CBA captured the town on 29 April 2024. After Kyindwe's capture, the CBA moved on Tedim on 26 May. After capturing several positions in the city, the offensive stalled, with both Chin and junta forces remaining in the town.

== Operation Chin Brotherhood ==
On 9 June, the CBA, Arakan Army and Magway-based Yaw Army began Operation Chin Brotherhood, attacking Matupi, officially announcing its start 4 days later. Shortly after the announcement, the Chinland Council issued a statement asking the Arakan Army to refrain from military and administrative operations in Chinland. Despite this, the offensive continued with CBA aligned forces capturing one of the two junta battalion bases outside Matupi on 17 June. Clashes between the CBA and CBA broke out during the push towards the final base, leading to 2 CBA deaths. The CNA/Chinland Council was forced to retreat from the Matupi area by 24 June On 29 June, the CBA captured the remaining junta base near Matupi and took over the town. Infighting continued with CNA detaining other Yaw Defense Force soldiers and MDF (under the CBA) and AA taking Lailenpi, Matupi Township from the CDF-Mara and CNA on 11 July.

On 9 November, the Chin Brotherhood Alliance relaunched Operation Chin Brotherhood, launching simultaneous offensives on Falam and Mindat, capturing most of the former. On 15 December, 123 junta troops and police officers from Mindat district and township police compounds, together with their families, surrendered to the CBA. On 21 December, the CBA declared Mindat a junta-free zone following the capture of the town. The following day, neighboring Kanpetlet was peacefully captured after junta forces retreated, leading to the liberation of the entirety of southern Chin State.

On 7 April 2025, the Chin Brotherhood captured IB 268, the last remaining junta outpost in Falam.
