= List of wars involving Myanmar =

This is a list of wars that involve Myanmar

Burmese victory
Burmese defeat
Other result
Ongoing

== Classical Burma ==
Conflict	Combatants		Result	Notable battles
Nanzhao invasion of Pyu city states	Pyu city states	Nanzhao Kingdom	Defeat	
Anawrahta conquest of Shan Hills	Pagan Kingdom	Nanzhao Kingdom; Shan States	Victory	
Anawrahta conquest of Thaton	Pagan Kingdom	Thaton Kingdom	Victory	
Anawrahta conquest of Arakan	Pagan Kingdom	Arakan	Victory	
Polonnaruwa–Pagan War (1165–1181)	Pagan Kingdom	Polonnaruwa kingdom	Polonnaruwa victory	
First Mongol invasion of Burma (1277–1287) (part of the Mongol invasions and Kublai Khan's campaigns)	Pagan Empire	Yuan dynasty, Mongol Empire	Mongol victory: Collapse of Pagan Empire; Rise of Shan states; Northern Burma to Tagaung added to the Yuan dynasty	Battle of Pagan (1287)

== Medieval Burma ==
Conflict	Combatants		Result
Second Mongol invasion of Burma (1300-1301) (part of the Mongol invasions)	Myinsaing Kingdom	Yuan dynasty	Burmese victory
Forty Years' War (1385–1423)	Ava: Kale; Mohnyin	Hanthawaddy Pegu: Arakan; Theinni	Stalemate: Pegu preserves independence; Arakan tributary of Pegu (1412–1421); No long-term changes
Mrauk U invasion of Chittagong (1530–1666)	Kingdom of Mrauk U Kingdom of Portugal	Bengal Sultanate	Arakanese victory: Mrauk U seizes Chittagong into its territory
Burmese–Siamese War (1547–1549) (part of the Burmese–Siamese wars)	Toungoo dynasty (Burma)	Ayutthaya Kingdom (Siam)	Inconclusive
Burmese–Siamese War (1563–1564) (part of the Burmese–Siamese wars)	Toungoo Empire: Sukhothai Kingdom; Lan Na Kingdom	Ayutthaya Kingdom (Siam)	Burmese victory
Toungoo–Ava War (1538–1545) (part of the Wars of Toungoo Empire)	Ava Kingdom; Confederation of Shan States; Hanthawaddy (1538–39); Prome (1538–42); Arakan (1538–42)	Toungoo Kingdom Portuguese contingent	Toungoo victory: Treaty of Pegu (1545); Toungoo gains Central Burma up to Pagan (Bagan)

== Toungoo dynasty ==
Conflict	Combatants		Result	Notable battles
Toungoo-Mrauk-U War (1545-1547) (part of the wars of the Toungoo Empire)	Toungoo Dynasty	Kingdom of Mrauk U	Mrauk U victory: Treaty of Mrauk U (1547); Status quo ante bellum	
Reintegration of the Shan states	Toungoo dynasty	Shan states	Victory	
Toungoo–Hanthawaddy War 1534-1541	Toungoo dynasty	Hanthawaddy kingdom	Victory	Battle of Naungyo (1538)
Burmese-Portuguese conflicts (1539–1617)	Toungoo dynasty	Kingdom of Portugal	Victory	
Burmese–Siamese War (1568–1569)	Toungoo dynasty	Ayutthaya Kingdom	Victory	
Toungoo conquest of Lan Na (1564)	Toungoo dynasty	Lanna kingdom	Victory	
Toungoo conquest of Lan Xang (1565)	Toungoo dynasty	Lan Xang	Victory	
Burmese–Siamese War (1584–1593)	Toungoo dynasty	Ayutthaya Kingdom	Defeat	
Mrauk U invasion of Tripura (1584)	Kingdom of Mrauk U	Kingdom of Tripura	Victory	
Burmese–Siamese War (1593–1600)	Toungoo dynasty	Ayutthaya Kingdom	Military stalemate	
Mrauk U invasion of Pegu	Toungoo dynasty	Kingdom of Mrauk U	Defeat	
1605 Syriam Battles	Mrauk U Kingdom; Pegu	(Kingdom of Portugal) Filipe de Brito	Defeat	
1613 Recapture of Syriam	Toungoo dynasty	(Kingdom of Portugal) Filipe de Brito	Victory	
Mrauk U invasion of Bhulua (1614–1615)	Kingdom of Mrauk U Kingdom of Portugal	Bengal Sultanate	Defeat	
Burmese–Siamese War (1609–1622)	Toungoo dynasty	Ayutthaya Kingdom	Victory	
Siege of Chittagong (1617)	Kingdom of Mrauk U	Mughal Empire	Victory	
Siege of Chittagong (1621)	Kingdom of Mrauk U	Mughal Empire	Victory	
Zhu Youlang rebellion (1661-1662)	Toungoo dynasty	Ming rebels	Victory	
Burmese–Siamese War (1662–1664)	Toungoo dynasty	Ayutthaya Kingdom	Military stalemate	
Conquest of Chittagong	Kingdom of Mrauk U	Mughal Empire (Bengal Sultanate) Bengal Subah; Netherlands; Portugal	Defeat	
Burmese–Siamese War (1675–1676)	Toungoo dynasty	Ayutthaya Kingdom	Military stalemate	
Burmese–Siamese War (1700–1701)	Toungoo dynasty	Ayutthaya Kingdom	Defeat	
Manipuri–Burmese wars of 1717 to 1749	Toungoo dynasty	Kingdom of Manipur	Defeat	
Hanthawaddy invasion of Toungoo dynasty (1752)	Toungoo dynasty	Restored Hanthawaddy Kingdom	Defeat	

== Konbaung dynasty ==
Conflict	Combatants		Result	Notable battles
Konbaung-Hanthawaddy War (1752-1757) (part of the Wars of Konbaung Empire)	Konbaung Dynasty; British East India Company (Nominal)	Restored Hanthawaddy Kingdom; French East India Company	Konbaung victory: End of Restored Hanthwaddy Kingdom; Konbaung annexes Lower Burma	
Burmese-Manipuri War (1758)	Konbaung dynasty	Manipur Kingdom	Victory	
Invasion of Negrais (1759)	Konbaung dynasty	East India Company	Victory	
Konbaung expedition to Lan na	Konbaung dynasty	Lanna kingdom	Victory	
Burmese–Siamese War (1759–1760) (part of the Burmese–Siamese wars)	Konbaung dynasty (Burma)	Ayutthaya Kingdom (Siam)	Inconclusive.: Burmese failed to capture Ayutthaya.	
Minkhaung Nawrahta rebellion	Konbaung dynasty	Minkhaung Nawrahta	Victory	
Toungoo rebellion of 1761-1762	Konbaung dynasty	Toungoo dynasty	Victory	
Lan Na rebellion 1761-63	Konbaung dynasty	Lanna kingdom	Victory	
Manipuri rebellion 1763	Konbaung dynasty	Manipur Kingdom	Victory	
Burmese conquest of Luang Prabang (1765)	Konbaung dynasty	Kingdom of Luang Prabang	Victory	
Burmese–Siamese War (1765–1767) (part of the Burmese–Siamese wars)	Konbaung dynasty (Burma)	Ayutthaya Kingdom (Siam)	Burmese victory: Burma temporarily captures most of Ayutthaya's major cities; Tenasserim remains under Burmese control by 1770	Battle of Nonthaburi (1765); Siege of Ayutthaya (1766 – 1767)
Sino-Burmese War (1765 – 1769) (part of the Ten Great Campaigns)	Burma	China Co-belligerents: Ayutthaya Kingdom (until 1767); Thonburi Kingdom (from 1767)	Burmese victory: Assured Burmese independence; Solidified tripartite division of Mainland Southeast Asia between Burma, Siam, and Vietnam	Battle of Goteik Gorge (1767 or 1768); Battle of Maymyo (1768)
Burmese–Siamese War (1775–1776) (part of the Burmese–Siamese wars)	Konbaung dynasty (Burma)	Thonburi Kingdom (Siam)	Siamese victory: Depopulation of Northern Thai Cities and destruction of Phitsanulok	
Burmese–Siamese War (1785–1786) (part of the Burmese–Siamese wars)	Konbaung dynasty (Burma)	Rattanakosin Kingdom (Siam): Lanna Kingdom	Siamese victory: Portions of Western Siam depopulated until the 1870s	
Konbaung Dynasty conquest of Arakan (1785)	Konbaung dynasty	Kingdom of Mrauk U	Burmese victory: Arakan is annexed by the Burmese	
Burmese–Siamese War (1788) (part of the Burmese–Siamese wars)	Konbaung dynasty (Burma)	Rattanakosin Kingdom (Siam)	Burmese victory	
Burmese–Siamese War (1792–1794) (part of the Burmese–Siamese wars)	Konbaung dynasty (Burma)	Rattanakosin Kingdom (Siam)	Burmese victory: Tenasserim remained within the Burmese sphere of influence, Tenasserim Coast depopulated	
Burmese–Siamese War (1797–1798) (part of the Burmese–Siamese wars)	Burma	Siam; Kingdom of Chiang Mai; Kingdom of Vientiane	Siamese victory: Siam gained Lan Na as a vassal	
Burmese–Siamese War (1802–1805) (part of the Burmese–Siamese wars)	Konbaung dynasty (Burma)	Rattanakosin Kingdom (Siam); Chiang Mai (tributary to Siam); Kingdom of Vientiane (tributary to Siam)	Siamese victory: Forced relocation of Tai Khuen and Tai Lue people to Siam; Siam gained control of Chiang Saen	
Burmese–Siamese War (1809–1812) (part of the Burmese–Siamese wars)	Konbaung dynasty (Burma)	Rattanakosin Kingdom (Siam); Kedah	Siamese and Kedahan victory: Phuket and many other Southern Siamese towns depopulated for several decades	
Burmese invasions of Assam (1817–1826)	Konbaung dynasty	Ahom Kingdom	Victory: Burmese occupation of Ahom	
First Anglo-Burmese War (1824–1826) (part of the Anglo-Burmese Wars)	Burma: Shan States; Allied Kachin Tribes	British Empire: East India Company; Co-belligerent: Siam	British victory: Treaty of Yandabo; Burma cedes Assam, Arakan and Tavoy; loses influence in Cachar and Jaintia; pays indemnity, Manipur gains independence.	Battle of Yangon (1824); Battle of Ramu – (1824); Battle of Danubyu – (1825); Battle of Prome – (1825)
Burmese–Siamese War (1849–1855) (1850-1854) (part of the Burmese–Siamese wars)	Konbaung dynasty (Burma); Kengtung State (under Burmese suzerainty)	Rattanakosin Kingdom (Siam); Kingdom of Chiang Mai (tributary to Siam); Princedom of Nan (tributary to Siam)	Burmese victory	
Second Anglo-Burmese War (1852–1853) (part of the Anglo-Burmese Wars)	Burma	British Empire: East India Company	British victory: British East India Company takes control of Lower Burma	
Third Anglo-Burmese War (1885) (part of the Anglo-Burmese Wars)	Burma	India	British victory: Annexation of the Konbaung dynasty into British India; Shan States became independent until the British incorporation into British India	

== Colonial and Postcolonial Era ==
Conflict	Combatants		Result	Notable battles
Burmese resistance (1885-1895)	Burmese rebels	(United Kingdom) British Empire: Pro-British Burmese	British victory: Pacification of British Burma	
Japanese invasion of Burma (1941–1942) (part of the South-East Asian theatre of World War II)	United Kingdom: India; Burma; (Republic of China (1912–1949)) China; United States (air support only)	Empire of Japan: (Myanmar) Burma Independence Army; Thailand (from 10 May)	Axis victory: Japanese occupation of Burma; Thai occupation of eastern Shan State	Battle of Bilin River – 14–18 February 1942; Battle of Sittang Bridge – 19–23 February 1942; Battle of Pegu – 3–7 March 1942; Battle of Taukkyan Roadblock – 7–8 March 1942; Battle of Tachiao – 18–19 March 1942; Battle of Toungoo – 19–29 March 1942; Battle of Oktwin – 20–23 March 1942; Battle of Toungoo – 24–30 March 1942; Battle of Yenangyaung – 11–19 April 1942; Battle of Prome (1942) – 1942
Burma campaign (1942–1943) (part of the Burma campaign of World War II)	Allies: United Kingdom: (British Raj) British India; (Myanmar) British Burma; United States (Republic of China (1912–1949)) Republic of China	Axis: (Empire of Japan) Japan: (Myanmar) State of Burma; Thailand	Axis victory:	Arakan Campaign 1942–1943 – December 1942–May 1943; First Chindit Expedition – 8 February–late April 1943
Burma campaign (1944) (part of the Burma campaign of World War II)	United Kingdom and Empire: India; Burma; Gambia; Gold Coast; Kenya; Nigeria; Northern Rhodesia; Southern Rhodesia; Nyasaland; Uganda; Nepal (See also Gurkha) (Republic of China (1912–1949)) China; United States	Japan: (India) Azad Hind (INA)	Allied victory	Battle of the Admin Box – 5–23 February 1944 (also known as the Battle of Ngakyedauk or the Battle of Sinzweya); Second Chindit Expedition – 5 February–17 August 1944; Battle of Maingkwan – February-5 March 1944; Battle of Mogaung – March 1944; Battle of Imphal – 8 March–3 July 1944; Battle of Sangshak – 20–26 March 1944; Battle of Kohima – 4 April–22 June 1944; Siege of Myitkyina – April–August 1944
Burma Campaign (1944–1945) (part of the Burma campaign of World War II)	Allies United Kingdom and Empire: India; Burma; Gambia; Gold Coast; Kenya; Nigeria; Northern Rhodesia; Southern Rhodesia; Nyasaland; Uganda; (Kingdom of Nepal) Nepal (See also Gurkha); (Republic of China (1912–1949)) China; United States; Patriotic Burmese Forces; Medical support: Belgian Congo	Axis (Empire of Japan) Japan: (Myanmar) State of Burma; (India) Azad Hind; Thailand	Allied victory: End of the Japanese occupation; The disbandment of the INA; Burma returned to British control	Battle of Ramree Island – 21 January–20 February 1945; Battle of Meiktila and Mandalay – January–March 1945 (also known as the Battle of Central Burma); Battle of Pokoku and Irrawaddy River operations – 4 February–13 May 1945; Battle for Pegu – 27–30 April 1945; Battle of Elephant Point – 1–2 May 1945
Internal conflict in Myanmar (1948–present)	Union of Burma (1948–1962); Socialist Republic of the Union of Burma (1962–1988); Union of Myanmar (1988–2011); Myanmar (since 2011); SAC (since 2021)	National Unity Government (since 2021); People's Defence Force; Ethnic armed organisations (Note: The government of Myanmar refers to all insurgent groups as "ethnic armed organisations", including groups like the All Burma Students' Democratic Front and Communist Party of Burma, which do not fight for a specific ethnic group's interests.)	Ongoing	
Campaign at the China–Burma Border (1960–1961) (part of the Cold War in Asia)	People's Republic of China Union of Burma	Taiwan	Victory: Withdrawal of Chinese nationalist forces from Burma	
Operation Sunrise (February 2019–June 2019) (part of the Insurgency in Northeast India)	Myanmar: Tatmadaw; Myanmar Police Force; India: Indian Armed Forces; Assam Rifles; Central Reserve Police Force	Arakan Army; National Socialist Council of Nagaland; United Liberation Front of Asom; National Democratic Front of Boroland; Kamtapur Liberation Organisation	Victory: Reduced insurgent activity	
Myanmar civil war (2021–present) (part of the Myanmar conflict)	Government of Myanmar: Tatmadaw; Myanmar Army; Border Guard Forces (Note: former New Democratic Army – Kachin, Lahu Democratic Front, Karen National Army); Myanmar Air Force; Myanmar Navy; Myanmar Coast Guard; Myanmar Police Force; Border Guard Police; Pyusawhti militias; Thway Thout; Aligned ethnic armed organisations: Arakan Liberation Army; Pa-O National Army; Karen National Army; Shanni Nationalities Army; Zomi Revolutionary Army; Wuyang People's Militia; Arakan Rohingya Salvation Army; Rohingya Solidarity Organisation; Smaller pro-SAC ethnic armed organisations; India	National Unity Government: People's Defence Force; Allied ethnic armed organisations: Northern Alliance; Kachin Independence Army; Brotherhood Alliance; Arakan Army; Myanmar National Democratic Alliance Army; Ta'ang National Liberation Army; 4K Coalition; Karen National Liberation Army; Karenni Army; Karenni National People's Liberation Front (since 2023); Karenni Nationalities Defence Force; Chinland Council; Chin National Army; Chinland Defence Force; Chin Brotherhood Alliance; Chin National Defence Force; Zoland Defence Force; Karen National Defence Organisation; Bamar People's Liberation Army; Pa-O National Liberation Army (since 2024); Smaller ethnic armed organisations; Other organisations: All Burma Students' Democratic Front; People's Liberation Army (Myanmar); Anti-Fascist Internationalist Front; Small independent anti-SAC guerrilla groups (Note: Hundreds of anti-SAC local defence forces are strewn across the country, which operate unconventionally, carrying out hit-and-run attacks, targeted killings, ambushes, remote bombings and a small number of rocket attacks.); Against India: Kuki National Army; National Socialist Council of Nagaland People's Liberation Army of Manipur; Zomi Revolutionary Army	Ongoing: Tatmadaw's stable control drops to between 72–220 out of 330 townships, though continues to control most major population centers; 96 towns captured by anti-Tatmadaw forces, including eighteen district-level or higher towns (as of 4 August 2024); Several regional administrations declared, including the State of Chinland and the Karenni State Interim Executive Council	

== See also ==
- Combatants of the internal conflict in Myanmar
