= Spillover of the Myanmar civil war (2021–present) =

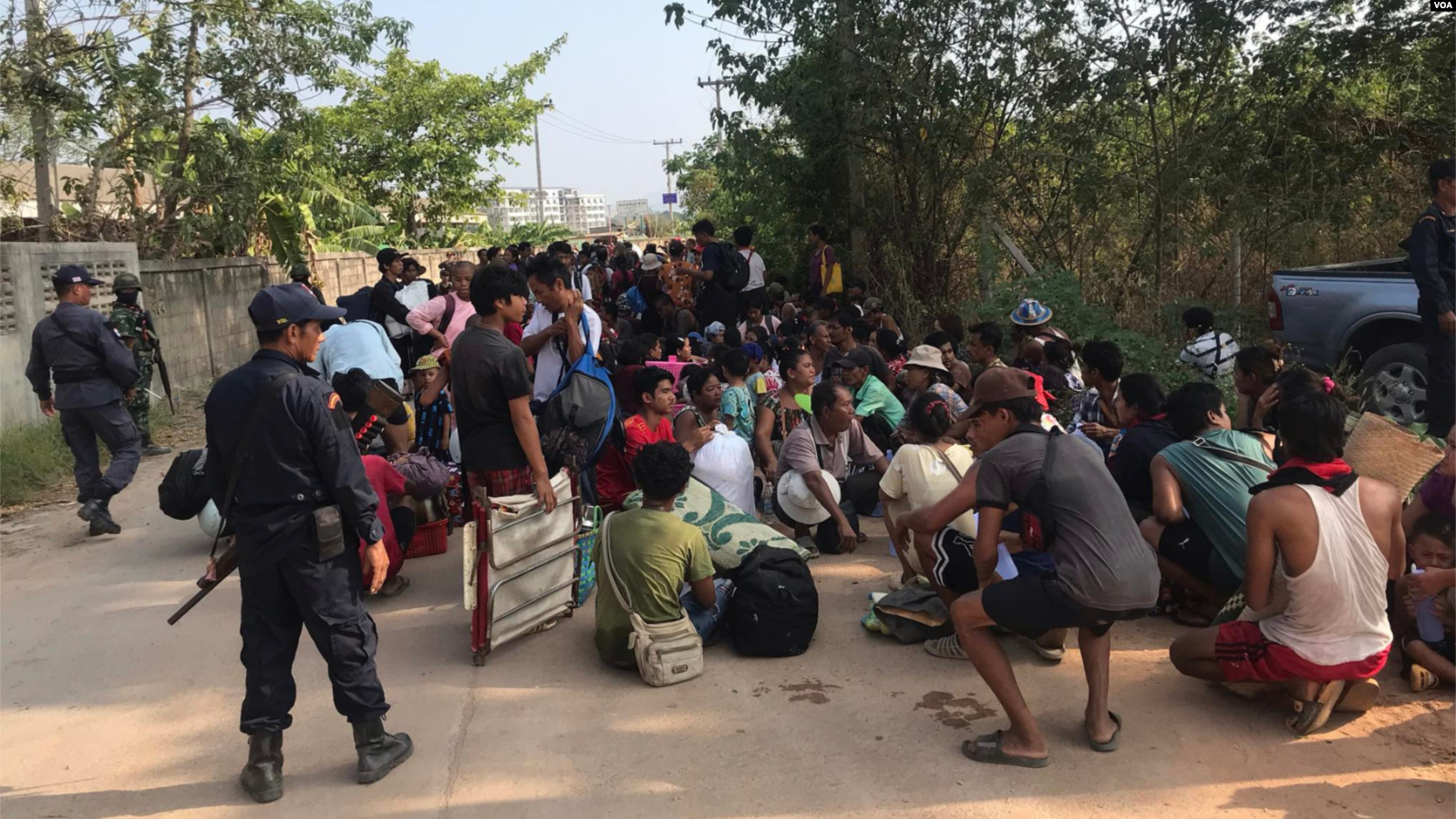
Myanmar civilians fleeing to Thailand during the siege of Myawaddy.

The ongoing Myanmar civil war has had an impact on neighbouring countries. Refugees and junta officials have fled into Bangladesh, India and Thailand. Territorial violations of Bangladeshi territory, such as artillery strikes and firing at vessels near St. Martin's Island, have caused border tensions. In India, the conflict is claimed to have contributed to the 2023–2026 Manipur violence.

== Bangladesh ==
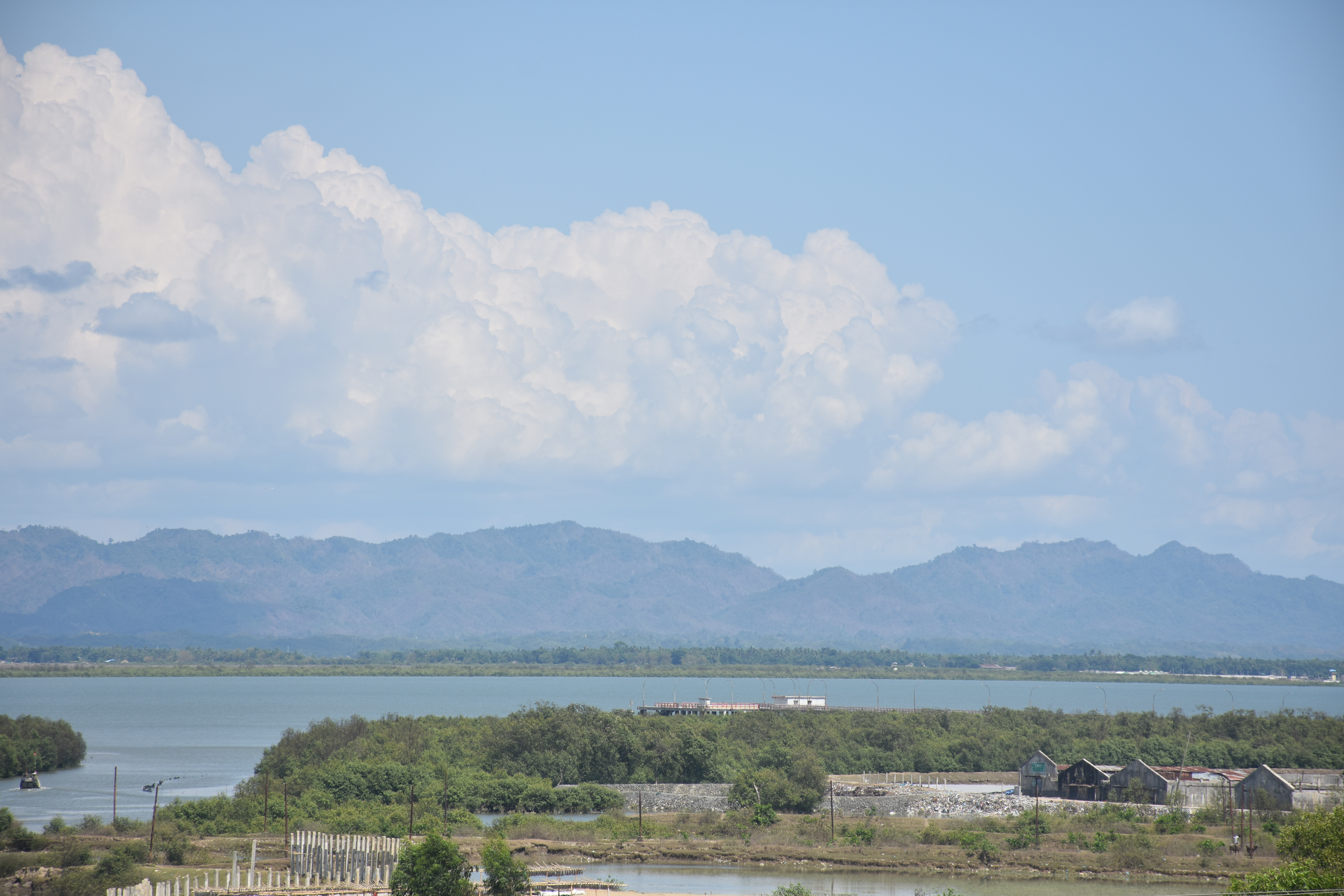
The Bangladesh-Myanmar border

The spillover of the Myanmar civil war has particularly been a cause of concern to Bangladesh. Beyond the influx of refugees from renewed violence on the border, the rise of the non-state actor Arakan Army created concerns about Rohingya repatriation.

Multiple Tatmadaw artillery strikes and landmines have accidentally ended up in Bangladesh territory over the course of the war. The war has strained Bangladesh's economy significantly by shrinking legal trade with Myanmar and increasing illegal activities such as smuggling, drugs, and human trafficking.

In August 2022, Bangladesh strongly protested territorial violations when two Myanmar Army mortar shells hit a Rohingya refugee camp in Bangladesh and when a junta helicopter entered Bangladeshi airspace and fired a shell. Aung Kyaw Moe, the ambassador of Myanmar to Bangladesh, was summoned by the Bangladesh ministry of foreign affairs four times in 2022 due to multiple violations of Bangladesh's airspace in the Naikhongchhari border area by the Myanmar Army.

On 3 February 2024, intensifying clashes between the Arakan Army and Tatmadaw in Rakhine state led to mortar shells and bullets landing in Bangladesh, injuring civilians and prompting local villagers to flee. Bangladeshi authorities closed schools and madrasas in border villages. In February 2024, 327 Myanmar Border Guard Police personnel sought refuge in Bangladesh due to clashes with the Arakan Army. Two days later, Prime Minister Sheikh Hasina instructed the Bangladesh Armed Forces and BGB to have patience regarding the situation in Myanmar. On 7 February BGB Director Mohammad Ashrafuzzaman Siddiqui recommended suspending the naval route to St. Martin's Island in Bangladesh due to the increasing border tensions, accordingly, sea travel to St. Martin's Island is indefinitely closed down by the district administration of Cox's Bazar from 10 February. On 8 February 2024, the Tatmadaw agreed to send a ship to take back the stranded BGP personnel in Bangladesh.

During June 2024, Myanmar Navy vessels reportedly fired at boats traveling near St. Martin's Island. However, it soon became unclear whether the shots came from Arakan Army or the Myanmar military. Due to the firing, the island's population faces a food shortage.

On 9 December 2024, Arakan Army captured all of the Burmese military outposts and seized control of the Myanmar's entire border with Bangladesh. With this victory, the AA has controlled all three Burmese townships bordering Bangladesh: Maungdaw, Buthidaung, and Paletwa.

In 2025, around more than 350 Bangladeshi fishermen were abducted by Arakan Army in the period of 10 months within the year. At least 28 people were also injured by landmines allegedly placed by the AA in the Bangladesh border.

On 11 January 2026, a 12 year old Bangladeshi national was killed between the clashes of Arakan Army and Rohingya militants in the Teknaf border.

Three Bangladeshi villagers were killed in a landmine explosion near the Bandarban border on 24 May 2026. The ULA/AA and a local resident in the area claimed the landmines were placed by armed groups such as ARSA, ARA, and RSO.

Twan Mrat Naing claimed in an interview with The Irrawaddy that AA has proof ARSA and the RSO coordinated with officers in the Bangladesh Armed Forces to attack positions in Maungdaw Township on 18 September 2025. The Bangladesh Border Guard (BGB) further denied this claim and termed it as "misleading".

== China ==
Fighting in northern Myanmar has repeatedly spilled into China's Yunnan Province, causing casualties and reactions from Beijing. In early January 2024, stray artillery shells from clashes in northern Myanmar landed in the Chinese border town of Nansan in Zhenkang County, injuring five civilians and damaging shops and buildings.

On 26 May 2026, U Min Zin, a Burmese-American scholar, was arrested by Chinese authorities after arriving in Kunming for alleged espionage. He is a contributor to the Institute of Strategic Policy - Myanmar think tank.

== India ==
The renewed ethnic conflict, particularly in Chin state, has fueled the displacement of many into India. On 22 September 2021, after the Battle of Thantlang, nearly 8,000 residents of Thantlang, Chin state, fled to Mizoram, India after houses were set ablaze by the junta army.

On January 10 and 12, 2023, Myanmar Air Force carried out airstrikes with one Yak-130 and two MiG-29 targeting Camp Victoria, the Chin National Army (CNA)'s headquarters, near the India-Myanmar border. Five CNA soldiers were killed, at least 10 were injured and some buildings were damaged. The air attacks violated Indian airspace and soil, according to the CNF, local Mizo organizations, and the international research and advocacy organization Fortify Rights. The Chin Human Rights Organization (CHRO) states that at least 200 Chin refugees crossed the border later the week following the airstrikes by Myanmar Army.

Later in March 2023, the Chinland Defence Force of Matupi engaged in attacks near Paletwa Township. CDF Paletwa assured that on 15 March 2023, Assam Rifles entered Paletwa township and fired gunshots. However, the Assam Rifles denied, saying its soldiers were engaged in “routine border point verification inside the Indian territory."

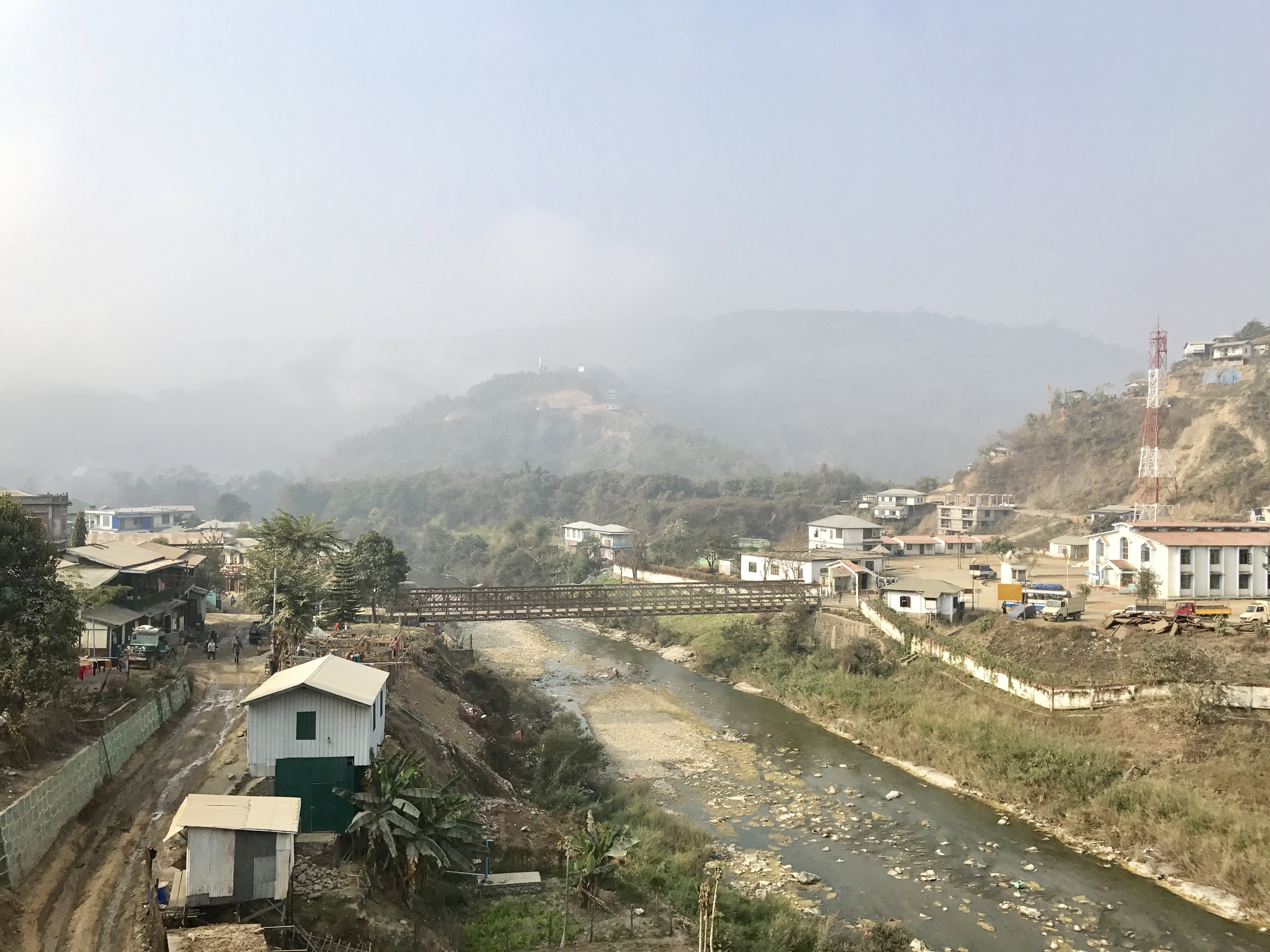
Indo-Burmese Border at Rikhawdar, Chin State

On 14 November 2023, the CNA and local CDF forces attacked the Myanmar Army's border guard outpost in Rikhawdar, Falam Township, a hub for border trade with India. The junta responded with air assaults using a jet fighter, to flee into Mizoram, India. A total of 43 Myanmar Army soldiers crossed the India-Myanmar border and sought refuge from the Indian police. They were handed to the Myanmar officials by the Indian authorities through the Moreh-Tamu border. Two days later, residents who had fled to India returned.

In late December 2023 and January 2024, fierce fighting in the Rakhine offensive (2023-present), 276 Myanmar army soldiers, with their arms, entered India surrendering to Indian authorities. Because of the influx of refugees and junta soldiers, the Indian government decided to fence the 1,000 miles (1,600 km) border with Myanmar.

On 13 July 2025, ULFA(I) claimed that the Indian Army launched drone attacks on camps shared by the group and NSCN(K) in Sagaing Region. Indian officials denied knowledge of any cross-border operations recently targeting ULFA(I).

On 17 July 2025, high-ranking members of the Chin Brotherhood Mara Defence Force, were arrested in Mizoram by a joint police-Assam Rifles task force. Body armor, helmets, and .22 Long Rifle rounds were seized.

On 13 March 2026, 6 Ukrainians and the Sons of Liberty International founder, Matthew VanDyke, were arrested by the National Investigation Agency for allegedly smuggling drones and training armed groups in Chin State. According to Advocate Pramod Kumar Dubey, the NIA possessed a flimsy case did not abide by the Vienna Convention on Consular Relations.

Rajeev Bhattacharyya, writing for The Diplomat, publicized the March 2026 deaths of 3 Bengali-speaking Indian nationals in Chin State on 13 April 2026. According to the Chin People's Defence Army (PDA), they detained the men on 17 March due to them not speaking English or any Kuki-Chin languages. Through an interpreter, the men claimed they intended to hawk mattresses at local markets and showed them a Inner Line Permit to sell mattresses in Champhai, Mizoram. On 22 March, the Zomi Revolutionary Army-Eastern Command allegedly raided the PDA camp and tortured the 3 men to death.

On 24 April 2026, National Socialist Council of Nagaland - Aleng Group militants recorded a video of 5 supposed captured militants from Kuki National Army-Burma before they were executed. According to Burmese pro-democracy outlets such as Mandalay Free Press, the men in the video were actually deserters from Tamu PDF who crossed into Kamjong District.

=== Impact on border states ===
Drug trafficking and the junta's use of aerial bombing and napalm has destabilized the border region. India expressed its concern to the junta about its military actions near its sensitive northeastern region in the wake of a massive exodus of refugees into India. In July 2023, there were an estimated 50,000 refugees who had fled to India. These refugees reportedly include many ex-security forces. Minister of Home Affairs Amit Shah stated that the mass influx of Christian Kuki people from Myanmar created fears of demographic change amongst the Meitei Hindus and triggered the violence. According to ground reports, many refugees also brought arms with them and instigated drug turf wars.

While the Myanmar refugees are given familial treatment with compassion to take shelter by the state government of Mizoram, the Manipur government's view on the matter is somewhat divergent. The Kuki-Zo demographic dominates Manipur's Churachandpur district which borders the state of Mizoram, and the dominant Mizos have strong ethnic relations with each other and with the Kukis of Myanmar. While Chief Minister Zoramthanga of Mizoram, under his governance, showed a sense of compassion towards refugees including ex-forces of Myanmar, at least some Zo-Kuki in Manipur are not happy with the attitude of Manipur government, under the leadership of Chief Minister N. Biren Singh, towards them who are, if not together, in the proximity of Myanmar immigrants.

On 14 May 2025, the Assam Rifles under the Eastern Command of the Indian Army shot and killed 10 insurgents in the Chandel District of Manipur. Burmese anti-junta officials confirmed that they were part of a PaKaFa unit (PDO) from Tamu, Sagaing Region. While India claims that the PDO fighters fired first, anti-junta officials claimed they were tortured. The bodies were returned after negotiations with the Indian government, but cross-border anxieties flared up.

On May 7, 2026, armed members of the Kuki National Army-Burma (KNA-B) and Village Volunteers Eastern Zone group from Myanmar reportedly attacked Tangkhul Naga villages in Kamjong district of Manipur and abducted a woman. The woman was managed to be secured by Assam Rifles two days later near the Z. Choro village.

== Thailand ==
On 5 April 2024, the junta garrison in Myawaddy surrendered to the KNLA, allowing anti-junta forces to take the border town. During the capture of Myawaddy, certain junta officials fled into Thailand. The junta requested Thailand for a military flight from Mae Sot to evacuate said officials and others awaiting refuge on the border.

The conflict has also contributed to a rise in malaria along the Myanmar–Thailand border.

On 30 November 2024, the Myanmar Navy opened fire on Thai fishing boats after allegedly intruding on Myanmar waters. One fisherman drowned, two were injured, and 31 crew members were detained.

On 30 November 2025, 4 Burmese migrant workers in Mae Sot were injured from shells originating from clashes between the Tatmadaw and the KNLA in Minletpan, Myawaddy Township.

On 22 January 2026, the Cobra Column unit of the Karen National Liberation Army handed over a Myanmar national, Naing Lin Aung, to the Royal Thai Army after he attempted to flee Thailand. He allegedly shot at a Thai police sergeant in Mae Sot during an undercover operation against arms smuggling 2 days earlier.

On 2 June 2026, three migrants from Myanmar were killed including two being wounded after a drone from Myanmar exploded in Thailand's Tak province.

On 5 July 2026, Tatmadaw shelling and machinegun fire targeting positions at Minletpan struck the Thailand border village of Huai Maha Wong in Mae Sot District.

On 1 August 2026, Thailand's Department of National Parks, Wildlife and Plant Conservation and the Karen National Union's Forest Protection and Conservation Unit jointly seized 18 teak logs found on a boat floating along the Salween River.

On 29 October 2026, stray fire from Tatmadaw weapons during clashes with the Karen National Liberation Army injured a resident in Mae Sot. As a result, the Naresuan Force of the Border Patrol Police suspended unofficial border trade until 5 November purportedly to prevent matériel support to both sides.

On 8 November 2026, the Royal Thai Air Force dispatched two F-16 MLU jets under a Quick Reaction Alert to "suspicious aircraft" near the Myanmar border.

== See also ==
- Foreign involvement in the Myanmar civil war (2021–present)
