= Battle of Kyindwe =

2023-2024 battle in Chin State, Myanmar

Coordinates: 20°58′00″N 93°50′30″E

- Part of the Chin theater of the Myanmar civil war (2021–present)
Date	22 December 2023 – 1 May 2024 (4 months, 1 week and 2 days)
Location	Kyindwe, Kanpetlet Township, Chin State, Myanmar
Result	Anti-junta victory

Belligerents
State Administration Council; Tatmadaw; Myanmar Army; North Western Command; Myanmar Police Force	Chin Brotherhood Alliance: Arakan Army; People's Defence Force

Commanders and leaders
Unknown	Unknown

Units involved
Tatmadaw: Myanmar Army; Myanmar Police Force; Pyusawhti militia	Chinland Defense Force; Chin National Defence Force; Local PDFs

Strength
At least 700	Unknown

Casualties and losses
Heavy	Heavy

The Battle of Kyindwe was an engagement between the Myanmar Army and anti-coup resistance forces in the town of Kyindwe, Kanpetlet Township, Chin State. The Chin Brotherhood Alliance, aided by the Arakan Army and People's Defence Force, started attacking Myanmar Army positions on December 22, 2023. Initially intending to capture the town by Christmas, constant airstrikes, heavy fire from entrenched junta forces, and ambushes by pro-junta militias impeded rebel efforts. After four months of constant fighting, anti-junta forces completely captured the town.
