= Battle of Thantlang =

2021 battle in Chin State, Myanmar

- Part of the Chin theater of the Myanmar civil war (2021–present)
Date	September 2021 – present
Location	Thantlang, Chin State, Myanmar 22°41′57″N 93°25′41″E
Result	Junta forces fully recaptured Hakha-Thantlang road: Junta forces and supply routes entered Thantlang; Junta forces repelled CC and CB forces along the Hakha-Thantlang road at the end of 9th of June

Belligerents
State Administration Council; Tatmadaw; Myanmar Army; North Western Command; Myanmar Police Force	Chin National Army; Chinland Defense Force

Commanders and leaders
Saw Ye Hmue Aung; Hein Myat Soe †	Van Dawt Chin †

Units involved
Tatmadaw; Myanmar Army; Light Infantry Battalion 269; Myanmar Police Force	Chin National Army; Chinland Defense Force; CDF - Thantlang; CDF - Zophei

Strength
150 (Note: As of July 13, 2025 On 17 September Chin forces captured Lai Villa Guest House in Thantlang.)	1,500+

Casualties and losses
121+ killed	48+ killed
- 9+ civilians killed 10,000+ displaced

The Battle of Thantlang is a series of battles fought over the control of Thantlang town in Chin State, Myanmar between junta forces and local Chin rebels in 2021. The battle has left the town largely destroyed. In 2023, there continue to be clashes in Thantlang as the junta attempts to regain control of the township.

== Background ==
Following the February 2021 military coup d'état, Thantlang saw several anti-coup protests. As the junta cracked down on the peaceful demonstrations, many residents took up arms and Chinland armed groups started to organise resistance. Military forces killed civilians with gunfire and artillery strikes and additionally set fire to the town several times burning over a thousand buildings. By September 2021, they started gaining ground in the township.

== Summary ==
=== Initial battle ===
On 19 September 2021 clashes broke out in Thantlang when Chin National Army (CNA) and CDF-Thantlang launched attack on a junta base reportedly killing around 30 soldiers. In response junta forces killed a Christian leader who tried to put out a fire. A month later they returned and burned down two churches and at least 164 homes.

By late November 2021 Chin forces captured 51 out of the 88 villages in the Thantlang Township.

On 9 June 2022 military forces burned down the decades-old Thantlang Baptist Church. On 1 February 2023 Chin forces captured two soldiers and four police officers with their weapons. At this rebel forces claimed to control around two-thirds of Thantlang.

The battle also lead to the exodus of thousands of residents as early as September 2021. Over 10,000 Thantlang residents fled the town, seeking refuge in the countryside and the neighbouring Indian state of Mizoram. By November 2022, much of Thantlang had been burned down.

=== Renewed battle ===
On 8 February 2023, joint CNA/CNDF forces attacked the Thantlang police station. The rebels successfully took control of the station by 2 a.m., claiming to have killed four officers. The forces lost one fighter and one fighter was injured. Additionally, they claimed to have captured 40 rifles as well as grenades, ammunition and an anti-drone weapon. Following this attack, the Tatmadaw remained in control of only Tat Kone hill near the town, where Light Infantry Battalion 269 was stationed.

On 26 May 2023, around 150 junta soldiers left Hakha to recapture Thantlang. They encountered Chin forces and the subsequent battle killed 27 junta soldiers while the rebels suffered 12 fatalities and 10 injuries. On 30 March 2023 junta forces bombed Khuabung village near Thantlang killing eight residents and injuring 20.

On 14 June, local media reported that junta forces had recaptured rebel camp in Lungkhar. One column of soldiers was reportedly in Thantlang while another was approaching it. During the attack, three rebel fighters were killed. On 16 June clashes again erupted in Thee Mit Valley with reportedly more than 50 soldiers were killed and 20 wounded and 12 Chin fighters killed and other 12 injured.

On 5 August 2024, Chin resistance captured the last Tatmadaw base in Thantlang. According to the CNA, there are only 150 stragglers remaining in the town. On 17 September Chin forces captured Lai Villa Guest House in Thantlang. On 7 October forces rebels captured CBA bank branch in Thantlang.

== Legal case in the Philippines ==
Banking on the principle of universal jurisdiction, legal case was filed against ten officials of the Myanmar junta over alleged war crimes committed in Thantlang in the legal system of the Philippines. The Myanmar Accountability Project and the Chin Human Rights Organization were behind the filing of the case.
