= Wailu airstrike =

- Part of Myanmar civil war (2021–present)
- Location: Wailu, Matupi Township, Chin State, Myanmar
- Date: November 15, 2023; 6:40pm
- Deaths: 13+
- Injuries: Several
- Perpetrator: Tatmadaw

On November 15, 2023, an airstrike by the Tatmadaw killed 13 people in the village of Wailu, Matupi Township, Chin State, Myanmar.

== Background ==
Since the start of the Myanmar civil war in 2021, the Burmese military junta (Tatmadaw) has conducted dozens of airstrikes on civilians across rebel-held areas of the country, massacreing hundreds. Three weeks prior to the Wailu massacre, Tatmadaw forces killed 28 people at Mung Lai Hkyet near Laiza, in Kachin State. The area where Wailu is located is Chin State in the west, where various ethnic Chin organizations control and fight for territory from the Tatmadaw. The Chinland Defense Force and the Arakan Army smuggle arms through Wailu, although there are no militant bases there.

== Airstrike ==
At about 6:40pm on November 15, two military jets passed over Wailu and began bombing the town. One bomb hit a building where students were studying, killing eight children under the age of 12 and three adults. The commander of Chinland Defense Force-Daai (CDF-Daai) said that 13 civilians were killed in the bombing, and several people were wounded.

The National Unity Government of Myanmar condemned the airstrike.
