= Battle of Mindat =

2021 battle in Chin State, Myanmar

- Part of the Chin theater of the Myanmar civil war (2021–present)
Date	First Battle: 24 – 26 April, 2021 (2 days); Second Battle: 12 – 13 May, 2021 (1 day)
Location	Mindat, Chin State, Myanmar 21°22′N 93°59′E
Result	SAC victory

Belligerents
Chinland Defence Force	State Administration Council

Strength
1,000 (junta claim)	Unknown

Casualties and losses
10	18
- 4 civilian deaths

The Battle of Mindat was the first large-scale military engagement of the current Myanmar civil war between civilians and the State Administration Council. It took place in and around Mindat, Chin State, in northwestern Myanmar in April and May of 2021. The battle reflected a growing trend of armed resistance in the lead-up to the formal declaration of war on 5 May by the National Unity Government of Myanmar. Mindat and Mindat Township continued to be a conflict-hit area and the battle was one of many clashes in Chin State since then.

== Background ==
In the aftermath of the 2021 Myanmar coup d'état, the Chinland Defense Force (CDF) was formed on 4 April 2021 as a group for the Chin people to resist the Myanmar junta. Clashes between civilian resistance fighters and the junta in Mindat on 1 April led to fifteen junta deaths and one wounded resistance fighter reported, according to reports from the CDF.

After the official formation of the CDF, renewed clashes began on 10 April, killing three junta soldiers.

== Timeline ==
=== First battle ===
After the arrest of anti-junta activists, fighting was reignited in Mindat, beginning on 24 April. The CDF routinely ambushed junta military convoys arriving as reinforcements. The Battle of Mindat became the first large-scale armed conflict arising from the 2021 coup. As a response, the junta cut off food and water supplies and declared martial law on 26 April. The CDF fighters, although poorly armed with little more than traditional hunting rifles, greatly outnumbered the junta. They also used their knowledge of the terrain to their advantage.

The fighting continued until a ceasefire on 27 April, when the junta released seven activists. However, the situation was not fully resolved with the junta demanding that its soldiers be allowed into Mindat, while the CDF continued demanding the release of five more activists.

=== Second battle ===
These demands eventually caused the reignition of fighting in Mindat on 12 May.

The resumption of fighting on 12 May saw the junta's forces shelling the town with mortars and other heavy equipment. The CDF ambushed another junta military convoy of six vehicles, seizing weaponry and routing the convoy. The junta stormed the town on 15 May, firing heavy weapons accompanied by airstrikes, and the CDF withdrew along with thousands of residents, to plan their next move. Fighting reportedly lasted from around 6:30 AM to 8:30 AM.

By 13 May, the town's local government, which had initially opposed the junta, was ousted and the town came back under the junta's control. Eight CDF deaths were reported, while twenty were injured, according to residents of Mindat.

== Aftermath ==
Many of the residents fleeing the military were men, as the military was reported to be arresting men, while some were allegedly used as human shields. As many men had left Mindat, increasing levels of sexual violence against women and looting of property were reported.

Mindat and Mindat Township continued to be a site of conflict for the next few years. In July 2021, the CDF seized control of a police station in the village of M'kuiimnu, Mindat Township. Later that month, on 30 July, CDF forces in the area killed Lieutenant Colonel Zaw Zaw Soe of the Myanmar Army, leading to more fighting along the highway near Mindat in August. In 2022, the CDF in Mindat, had received training and arms from the Arakan Army.

In December 2024, Mindat came under total control of anti-junta forces as a result of Operation Chin Brotherhood.

== Reactions ==
The U.S. embassy for Myanmar said in a statement that "they call on the military to cease violence against civilians."
