= Chinland Council =

Political institution of Chinland

Type
- Type: Unicameral
- Established: 6 December 2023

Leadership
- Chairman: Pu Zing Cung

Structure
- Seats: 112
- Political groups: Local Administrations (68) Chin National Front Officials (27) Former MPs (13)

Meeting place
- Camp Victoria, Chinland

The Chinland Council (Burmese: ချင်းပြည်ကောင်စီ) is the supreme governing body and the primary authority responsible for setting the overall political direction and general priorities of the self-governing polity known as the state of Chinland. Per the 2023 Chinland Constitution, it composed of three constituencies grouping from Chin parliamentary representatives elected during 2020 Myanmar general election who participates in post-2021 revolution group, representatives from Chin National Front group and representatives from township and regional village-tract/circle/tribal group.

It was formed on 6 December 2023 following the adoption of the Chinland Constitution by the Chinland Convention that was ratified by 235 representatives of various Chin communities from the Chin State. The Chinland Council has 112 members variously from: the Chin National Front (CNF) (27), Chin officials elected for the now dissolved Pyidaungsu Hluttaw (13), and local administration organizations (68).

== Composition ==
Per the Chinland Constitution (2023), there are three groups of constituencies in the Chinland Council.

1	Chin National Front	15 representatives
2	Chin MPs from 2020 Myanmar general elections, who participated in the revolution	-
3	Representatives from township and autonomous areas	8 representatives from each township where autonomous areas doesn't exist; 5 representatives from each township where autonomous areas exist; 3 representatives from autonomous areas

=== Chinland Council Leadership Team ===
No	Name	Position	Term
1	Pu Zing Cung	President	6 December 2023 2 years, 249 days
2	Salai Men Nyo	Vice President 1	6 December 2023 2 years, 249 days
3	Pu Bawi Kung	Vice President 2	6 December 2023 2 years, 249 days
4	Salai Paul	Secretary	6 December 2023 2 years, 249 days
5	Salai Htet Ni	Joint Secretary 1	6 December 2023 2 years, 249 days
6	Pu Tial Ling	Joint Secretary 2	6 December 2023 2 years, 249 days

== Events ==
The Council elected the first Government of Chinland on 1 February 2024. Pu Pa Thang was appointed Prime Minister, the Vice Chair of the Chin National Front, Dr. Sui Khar, was appointed Foreign Minister, and Pu Thawng Za Lian was made Defence Minister.

The formation of the Chin State government by the Chinland Council faced opposition from various Chin organizations. Despite warnings against hasty actions that could hinder Chin national unity, the government was established quickly. The Interim Chin National Consultative Council expressed objections on 3 February 2024, while the Zomi People's Central Council stated on 9 February 2024, that the new government would not represent the Zomi nationalities.

On 26 February 2025, it was announced that the Chinland Council had come into an agreement with the Interim Chin National Consultative Council / Chin Brotherhood. The agreement required that the two groups merge into a "Chin National Council" for a unified administration of the liberated areas of Chin State. In order to facilitate the formation of such an administration, the Chin National Constitution Drafting Committee was formed. Representatives of each group met in Mizoram, which was reportedly arranged by the chief minister of Mizoram.

== Military Membership ==
- Chin National Front (Chin National Army)
- CDF-Hakha Central Council
- Hualngoram People’s Organization (CDF-Hualngoram)
- CDF-Kalay-Kabaw-Gangaw
- Kanpetlet Council
- Lautu Region People Administration (CDF-Lautu)
- Maraland Council (CDF-Mara)
- CDF-Matupi (Brigade 2)
- Mindat Council (CDF-Mindat)
- Paletwa Council (CDF-Paletwa)
- Senthang Central Council (Senthang Revolution Force)
- Siyin Regional Council (CDM-Siyin)
- Tedim Township Council (People's Defense Army)
- Thado Council (CDF-Thado)
- CDF-Thantlang
- Tonzang Township Council (CDF-Tonzang)
- Zanniatland People’s Organization (CDF-Zanniatram)
- Zopheiram Council (CDF-Zophei)
- Zotung Federal Council (CDF-Zotung)

The Daai Regional Council (CDF-Daai) resigned from the Chinland Council in July 2024.
