= Pu Pa Thang =

Prime minister of Chinland

Prime Minister of the State of Chinland
- Incumbent
- Assumed office 1 February 2024
- Preceded by: Salai Lian Luai (as Chief Minister of the Chin State)

Member of the Pyithu Hluttaw
- In office 31 January 2016 – 31 January 2021
- Constituency: Matupi Township
- Majority: 34.68%

Personal details
- Born: June 20, 1970 (age 55) Matupi Township, Chin State
- Party: National League for Democracy

Pu Pa Thang (Burmese: ပါထန်း) is a Chin politician who has served as Prime Minister of the self-declared State of Chinland since appointment by the Chinland Council on 1 February 2024. He previously served as a National League for Democracy (NLD) Member of the Chin State Hluttaw for Matupi.

Pu Pa Thang served as a Member of the Chin Nunphung Committee.

He may be the Chin villager forced to carry the military rations of the Burma Army's Light Infantry Battalion (LIB) No. 304 by Captain Ne Win Htun near Darkhai village, Tonzang Township, Chin State on 24 January 2013. Pa Thang subsequently informed the Chin Human Rights Organization (CHRO).

As Prime Minister, he oversaw the humanitarian response to the 2025 Myanmar earthquake in Chinland.
