= Kaisi Tlang =

Mountain in Chin State, Myanmar

Coordinates: 21°58′49″N 92°52′36″E

Kaisi Thlang is a mountain range in Matupi Township in Myanmar's Chin State. It is the northern part of Matupi and Amsol village, inside the Sizo tribal territory. It was originally called Kiasie, which is a name given by the local tribes. The mountain range starts in Chheihlu village in the north of India. The 1967 boundary agreement between Burma and India used this mountain range as a reference point for the border.
