= Khuahung village =

Village Chin State, Myanmar

Coordinates: 21°37′02″N 93°14′02″E

Khuahung (formerly known as Lenang Khua) is a village located near Kadi and Hla ut streams, and belongs to Matupi township in the southern part of the Chin State of Myanmar. This village belong to Ta Aw Khumi's tribe and spoke in Khumi dialect.

The village was founded by Mr. Lenang around 1921. Khuahung was neighboring with Boiring village before, Daihnan village was created between these two villages. Now Khuahung, Boiring and the newly created Daihnan villages are annexed to one group. In 1974, Daihan village took the land from Khuahung and Boiring since then it is still disputing with claim of lands in these areas.
