= PDF Zoland =

Armed group in Chin State, Myanmar

People's Defence Force Zoland
- ဇိုလဲန်းပြည်သူ့ကာကွယ်ရေးတပ်မတော်
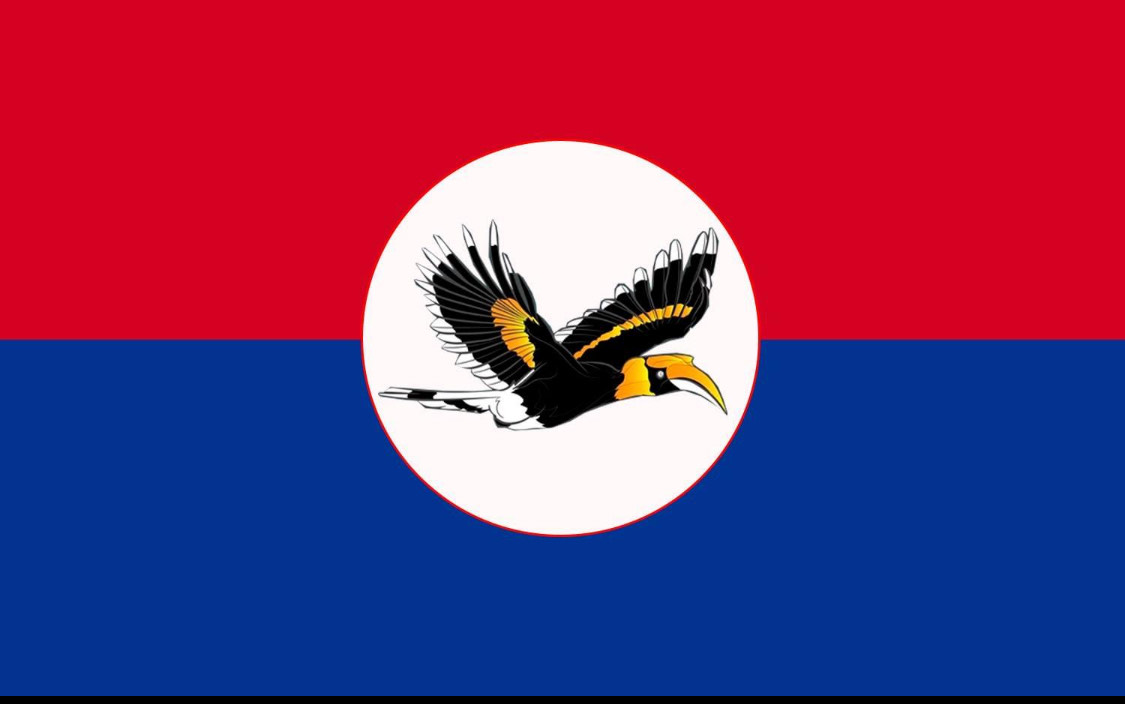
- Flag of the Zomi Federal Union
- Other name: PDF Zoland
- Founding leader: Hang Khan Lian (Singapore)
- Dates active: 2021
- Country: Myanmar
- Allegiance: ICNCC
- Group: Chin Brotherhood
- Active regions: Chin State
- Ideology: Federal democracy
- Part of: Zomi Federal Union

People's Defence Force-Zoland, also known as Zoland Defence Force and shortened to PDF-Zoland, is a People's Defence Force armed group in Chin State, Myanmar. They're the armed wing of the Zomi Federal Union (ZFU), and a key member of the Chin Brotherhood Alliance, formed in December 2023 alongside the Chin National Defence Force (CNDF) and Chinland Defense Force-Mindat (CDF-Mindat). This alliance aims to enhance collaboration in both political and military endeavors concerning Chin State and Chin ethic affairs.

The Chinland Defense Force and PDF-Zoland were established the same year in 2021, in response to the military coup in Myanmar. Their primary goals are to protect civilians from the junta, abolish the 2008 Constitution of Myanmar, end military rule and establish a federal union.

The PDF-Zoland has faced challenges, including attacks from the Zomi Revolutionary Army (ZRA), who have raided their basecamps and tortured their members. PDF Zoland attracted Western volunteers, including a former British soldier and an American veteran, during their fight against the junta.

== History ==
On 21 November 2023, the PDF Zoland seized a junta base on Kennedy Peak, the second highest mountain in Chin State.

On 6 May 2026, the Myanmar military recaptured the Kenedy Peak's base. On May 6, the military bombed a church in Phunom village, Tedim Township, Chin State, using a drone, resulting in the deaths of a total of 10 civilians, including 15 comrades from the People's Defence Force (PDF Zoland).
