= Salai Sun Ceu =

Salai Sun Ceu Salai Sun Ceu u
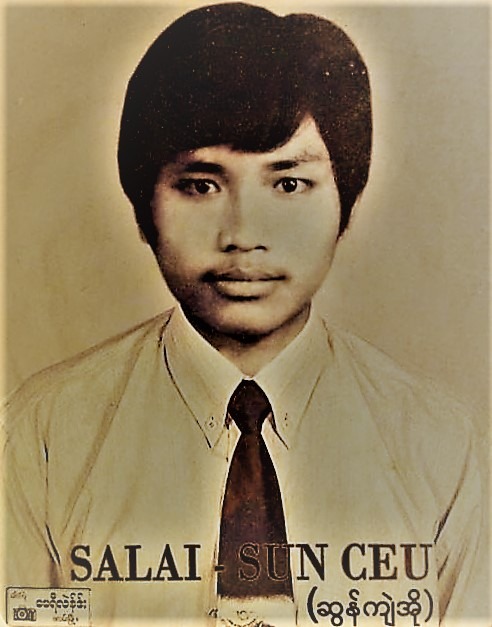

Background information
- Born: 13 January 1952; Locom Khua, Falam, Burma
- Died: 7 April 2004 (aged 52) Pathein, Myanmar
- Occupation: Singer-songwriter
- Years active: 1975–1996

Salai Sun Ceu (Burmese: ဆလိုင်း ဆွန်ကျဲအို, also spelt Salai Kye Oh; 13 January 1952 – 7 April 2004) was a popular Chinland and Myanmar pop singer and songwriter. He died in 2004 from cardiac arrest.

== Discography ==
Studio albums

- 1975 (Kyi Nat Ba Dawh) ကြေနပ်ပါတော့
- 1976 (Sig tha ya a luan) စိတ္တရအလွမ်း
- 1976 (Pa da ta lan, than ta lan) ပြဓါးတစ်လမ်း သံတစ်လမ်း
- 1978 (Htin khuk tha ma) ထင်း ခုပ်သမား
- 1994: (Sung phiat laih bah, sung phiat laih byi) ဆုံးဖြတ်လိုက်ပါ။ ဆုံးဖြတ်လိုက်ပြီ။
