= Chin National Defence Force =

Insurgent organization in Myanmar (Burma)

Chin National Defense Force
- ချင်းအမျိုးသားကာကွယ်ရေးတပ်ဖွဲ့
- Flag of the Chin National Defense Force
- Dates active: 13 April 2021 – present
- Headquarters: Camp Rihli, Chin State
- Active regions: Chin State; Magway Region; Sagaing Region; India-Myanmar border
- Ideology: Chin nationalism Federalism
- Part of: Chin National Organisation; Chin Brotherhood Alliance
- Wars: the Internal conflict in Myanmar

Chin National Defence Force (Burmese: ချင်းအမျိုးသားကာကွယ်ရေးတပ်ဖွဲ့; abbreviated CNDF) is a Chin ethnic armed organisation in Myanmar. It is the armed wing of the Chin National Organisation (CNO), and was founded on 13 April 2021 alongside it. It is one of the armed groups formed in Falam, Chin State of Myanmar in response to the Myanmar military's coup d'état after 1 February 2021.

In 2024, the CNDF was one of the founding members of the Chin Brotherhood Alliance, siding with anti-junta groups who opposed the formation of Chinland by the Chin National Front (CNF). The CNDF in Matupi Township warned the CNF to focus on taking the state capital Hakha, and that the group would fight back against further confrontations. Throughout 2024, the group clashed with Chinland Council-aligned groups as well as with the junta.

Between November 2024 and April 2025, the CNDF participated in the Battle of Falam and the larger Operation Chin Brotherhood. After Falam's capture, the CNDF reportedly assumed control.

Beginning in July 2025, underlying tensions between the CNDF and Chinland Council groups, primarily CDF-Hualngoram, grew into armed clashes. On 5 July, the CNDF reportedly captured Rihkhawdar from CDF-Hualngoram. In retaliation, the Chin National Army captured the CNDF headquarters at Camp Rihli, with the CNDF spokesman accusing the CNA of attempting to occupy Falam.

Acting as defence secretary in the Chin National Defence Force is Olivia Thawng Luai.
