= Burma War =

Burma War may refer to:

- Anglo-Burmese Wars (1824–55)
- Burma campaign of World War II (1941–45)
- Myanmar conflict (ongoing since 1948)
  - Myanmar civil war (2021–present), ongoing conflict
- Other wars involving Myanmar
