= Chin Brotherhood =

Military alliance in Myanmar

Chin Brotherhood Alliance
- Burmese: ချင်းညီနောင်
- Founded: 30 December 2023
- Dates active: 30 December 2023–present
- Groups: Chin National Defence Force; Chin People's Army; Maraland Defence Force; PDF Zoland
- Active regions: Chin State; Magway Region; Sagaing Region; India-Myanmar border

The Chin Brotherhood Alliance (CB) is a military and political alliance between several ethnic armed organisations active in Chin State, Myanmar. Formed on 30 December 2023 during the Myanmar civil war, the claimed goal of the alliance is to foster collaboration concerning affairs in Chin State and in the Chin ethnic community. The alliance was created by local Chin people's defence forces who believed that the establishment of the Chinland Constitution, the Chinland Council, and the State of Chinland "did not adhere to democratic standards, lacked equality, and failed to represent and reflect the unity of the entire Chin ethnic group."

On 11 May 2025, the alliance announced it was working towards unifying its 6 members into a single Chin army.

In November 2025, plans were made between the southern members of the alliance to unite. Eventually, on 12 January 2026, CDF-Mindat (Mindat Revolutionary Committee), CDF-Matupi (Matupi Revolutionary Federation), CDF-Kanpetlet (Kanpetlet Township Council), and the CDF-Daai (Daai Regional Council) announced they were uniting into the Chin People's Army (Chin People's Union). The CPA claimed that their unification was the first step towards a unified Chin Army, and that the unification would allow for easier administration and military issues.

== Conflicts with other Chin groups ==
On 31 January 2024, the CDF-Mara, CDF-Paletwa, CDF-Thantlang, CDF–Zophei, CDF-Lautu, and CDF–Senthang, alongside the Chin National Army (CNA), launched an offensive on Chin Brotherhood member the Maraland Defence Force (MDF) after the MDF reportedly killed a CNA soldier and detained several CDF-Mara soldiers. A month later, the MDF and CNA clashed in Paletwa Township near the Chin State-Rakhine State border.

In early May, after the Chin Brotherhood captured the town of Kyindwe, the alliance accused the Chinland Council and the Chin National Front of trying to take advantage of the conflict in Chin State to occupy the town and expand their territorial control. In the same statement, it urged the CNF to prioritise attacks on the Chin State capital of Hakha and warned that the alliance would "fight back" if confrontations continued. The Chinland Defense Force-Matupi (Brigade 2), a Chinland Council member, condemned the accusations.

On 19 February 2025, the CB and the CNA agreed to form a united front after negotiations in Mizoram, India.

Beginning in July 2025, underlying tensions between the CNDF and Chinland Council groups, primarily CDF-Hualngoram, grew into armed clashes. On 5 July, the CNDF reportedly captured Rihkhawdar from CDF-Hualngoram. In retaliation, the Chin National Army captured the CNDF headquarters at Camp Rihli, with the CNDF spokesman accusing the CNA of attempting to occupy Falam.

== Membership ==
Founding Members:

- Chin National Organisation (Chin National Defence Force)
- Zomi Federal Union (PDF Zoland)
- Chin National Council (CDF Mindat)

Later Members:

- Mara Territorial Committee (Maraland Defence Force)
- Chin People's Union (Chin People's Army)
