= Camp Victoria, Chinland =

Chin rebel base in Myanmar

Camp Victoria
- Interactive map of Camp Victoria
- Country: Myanmar (de jure); Chinland (de facto)
- State: Chin (de jure)

Camp Victoria, also known as Chinlung, is a rebel base and seat of government of the State of Chinland and the Chinland Council in Myanmar. It is the headquarters of the Chin National Army.
