= Matupi District =

District in Chin State, Myanmar

Coordinates: 21°35′48″N 93°26′39″E

Matupi District is a district of the Chin State in western Myanmar. The district headquarters is Matupi Town.

Location in Chin state

The Chin National Council (CNC)- Matupi, nicknamed as the Matupi Council, was established on June 22, 2025 in order to manage the affairs of the district following the capture of the military camps based in the Matupi town. This new governing body is led by the Matupi township Administrative department, the Executive departments, the committee of township elders, a unit of Civilian Movement against the military Coup, and the Committee of Global Matu Supporting for revolution, by forming the CNC- Matupi, reaffirmed their commitment to further engage all civilian and non-civilian groups, in accordance with the consensus and mandate of the previous joint meeting on January 25, 2025 including the Defence Body named Chin Defence Force- Matupi, which is a member armed organization of Chin Brotherhood. The establishment of a regional district council is a historic success and extraordinary achievement of multi-revolutionary bodies within the district, as well as supporters in the diaspora, to galvanize greater participation of all revolutionary units at national, state, and local levels, highlighting the unity and strength of citizens in the democratization process in the state-building vision of Chin State. This autonomous council has officially taken over the administration of the departments run by the previous ruling dictatorial government and embarked upon a new dawn of the self-rule of the people of Matupi District.
