= Zomi Revolutionary Army =

Zomi nationalist militant group

- Flag of the Zomi people, adopted by the ZRA
- Leader: Thanglianpau Guite
- Dates active: 1993–present
- Headquarters: Churachandpur, Manipur, India
- Ideology: Zomi nationalism
- Wars: Internal conflict in Myanmar: Myanmar civil war (2021–present); Clashes in Chin State; Insurgency in Northeast India: Insurgency in Manipur

The Zomi Revolutionary Army (ZRA) is a Zomi nationalist militant group formed in 1997, following an increase in ethnic tensions between the Thadou-Kuki people and the Paite people in Churachandpur district of Manipur, India. Its parent organisation, the Zomi Re-unification Organisation, was founded in April 1993. The organization is led by Thanglianpau Guite.

== Background ==
The Zo identity for the Kuki-Chin language speaking people in Northeast India and Myanmar's Chin State began to take shape soon after World War II. The people of the then Lushai Hills district in India (present-day Mizoram) rallied behind a "Mizo" (transl. Zo people) identity in 1946. In 1953, the Baptist Associations of Tedim, Falam and Hakha in Myanmar's Chin State adopted Zomi (transl. Zo people) as their "national" name (subsuming the various tribal identities). In India's Manipur state, T. Gougin formed a "United Zomi Organisation" in 1961 and "Zomi National Congress" in 1972. The final step in these Zomi nationalist movements was taken in April 1993, when a Zomi Re-unification Organisation (ZRO) was formed at Phapian in Kachin State of Myanmar, under the leadership of Tedim Chins and Paites. It had the professed objective of unifying all the Zo people divided across national borders (India, Myanmar and Bangladesh) under a united "Zomi" identity.

With these antecedents, seven Kuki-Zo tribes of Churachandpur district in Manipur, that had previously declined to accept the Kuki identity, agreed to come under the banner of Zomi Re-unification Organisation in 1995. The seven tribes were Hmar, Zou, Vaiphei, Gangte, Simte, Sukte (Tedim Chins) and Paite, with the Paites leading the grouping. Its formation day is said to be observed by its adherents on 20 February every year as Zomi Nam Ni. (Note: Zomi Nam Ni is translated as "Zomi national day". Its celebration started in the Churachandpur town around 1994–1995. However, it was already being celebrated in Chin State to mark the day when Chins switched to a democratic system of administration on 20 February 1948, dispensing with traditional chieftaincies. Starting as "Chin National Day", the event is said to have been renamed as "Zomi National Day" in 1950.) By 1997, the organisation also formed an underground military wing called Zomi Revolutionary Army (ZRA, also referred to as "Zomi Re-unification Army") ostensibly to defend the tribes under its umbrella from rival tribes, mainly the Thadou Kukis.

== History ==
At the time of the formation of ZRA, the tensions between the "Kukis" (Thadou-Kukis) and the tribes belonging to the Zomi grouping were on the rise. The Kuki–Naga conflict caused many Thadou-Kukis to migrate to the Churachandpur Town, which was previously dominated by Paites, and also caused the armed group Kuki National Front (KNF) to increase its demands for contributions. ZRO and ZRA objected to KNF's demands from the "Zomi" community, and allegedly berated KNF for picking a conflict with the Naga militant group NSCN-IM. The KNF, in turn, suspected ZRA of teaming up with NSCN-IM. A year-long conflict between the Kukis and Zomis erupted in June 1997, in which the ZRA is said to have taken a beating due to having been inadequately armed. According to security specialist E. N. Rammohan, the Paite fighters fled to Myanmar, where they teamed up with NSCN-IM to regroup and arm themselves.

As a result of the Kuki–Paite clashes, the Gangte and Hmar tribes left the Zomi umbrella. ZRA is said to have supported itself through extortion and occasional kidnapping in the Churachandpur district. Both KNF and ZRA faced splits and defections after the clashes, and saw the formation of new groups rivalling each other. In 1997, the Zou tribe formed Zou Defence Volunteers (ZDV) in Chandel district.

In 2005, the Vaipheis, who were not happy with the treatment given by the Zomis, formed their own armed group called United Socialist Revolutionary Army (USRA), and the Hmars formed the Hmar National Army (HNA). A rival Paite group called Zomi Revolutionary Front (ZRF) was also formed. These rival groups eventually joined the fold of a Kuki-led umbrella group Kuki National Organisation (KNO). ZRA led another umbrella group called United People's Front (UPF). All the groups resorted to extortion, drug trade, kidnapping for ransom, forced recruitment of young children as cadres, denial of voting rights to unarmed sections of the community etc.

On 9 June 2005, ZRA insurgents ambushed a truck in Churachandpur district carrying Zomi Revolutionary Front (ZRF) insurgents, killing three ZRF members and one civilian. This attack was in retaliation for the ZRF's defection from the ZRA.

=== Ceasefire ===
In August 2005, both KNO and UPF signed a Suspension of Operations (SoO) agreement with the Indian security forces. The militant groups agreed to abjure the path of violence and refrain from unlawful activities such as killing, kidnapping, extortion, intimidation, carrying of arms in public, and the imposition of 'taxes' and 'fines'. The government agreed not to launch offensive operations against the armed groups. The armed groups provided lists of their cadres to the security forces, and agreed to stay in designated camps. Identity cards were issued to the cadres, and arms were deposited under a double locking system. According to the ZRA's statement, the agreement was to last six months, starting from 1 August. The ZRA also said that they had "viewed the steps taken by the Indian government in this regard as a positive approach towards the better understanding of our unique history, and the realisation of the need for a permanent solution to the long standing aspirations of the Zomi people". In 2008, the SoO agreement was revised to a tripartite agreement with the inclusion of the Government of Manipur.

Despite this agreement, the Indian security forces allegedly conducted operations against the ZRA during the ceasefire. On 20 August 2006, two civilians were killed and four others were injured after Indian security forces opened fire on a group of churchgoers in the Vengnuam subdivision of Churachandpur, the ZRA's stronghold, believing incorrectly that ZRA members were present. Later in September, ZRA insurgents clashed with other insurgents belonging to the Zomi Revolutionary Front, resulting in six deaths; one ZRA activist was also injured.

In early 2010, two ZRA insurgents were killed in a clash with insurgents belonging to the Revolutionary People's Front, the armed faction of the People's Liberation Army of Manipur operating in interior Manipur. That year, the Union home minister P. Chidambaram visited the ZRA camp in Muvanlai and spent 45 minutes. He promised to initiate talks on the Zomi demand for an autonomous hill state within Manipur. The demand has since evolved into an autonomous territorial council similar to the Bodoland Territorial Council.

=== ZRA Eastern Command in Myanmar ===
Even though ZRO was originally founded in the Kachin State of Myanmar, it does not appear that it had much following in Myanmar. A US State Department cable from c. 2010 stated that ZRA had 200 fighters from mostly Paites (presumably from Churachandpur district). Five fighters from the Chin National Army (CNA) were said to have joined it after CNA became defunct.

By around 2020, reports started appearing referring to an "Eastern Command" (EC) of ZRA in Myanmar's Chin State. Reports said that it was attacking Chinland Defence Force, having allied with the Burmese military junta.

=== Myanmar civil war ===
Although ZRA Eastern Command (ZRA-EC) initially claimed to not be cooperating with the military junta, the State Administration Council, news began to surface about ZRA's cooperation with Myanmar military. ZRA-EC was said to be operating under the proxy command of the junta's Regional Tactical Command based in nearby Kalay in Sagaing Region and it continually attacked Chin resistance forces and aided Myanmar military in its battles against the resistance. ZRA-EC was also accused to be involved in opium cultivation with the Myanmar military junta's assistance in Tonzang Township, Chin state, as it was reported in a UNODC survey in 2022 that poppy cultivation, which was not prevalent in Chin state prior to the military coup in February 2021, suddenly saw a rise in Chin state, concentrating in ZRA-controlled areas.

In January 2022, ZRA-EC is said to have clashed with Chin National Front and Chin National Army (CNF/CNA) resistance forces, and lost four fighters. People's Liberation Army of Manipur (PLA) is also said to be using similar strategies in fighting the Myanmar resistance forces.

In late August and early September 2023, the Chinland Defense Force claimed that two of their soldiers were killed after the ZRA-EC attacked bases in Tonzang Township. During the first raid, the CDF was greatly outnumbered, and military equipment was seized. Another camp was raided the following week, ZRA killing one CDF fighter, and confiscating one rifle. By September 2023, the ZRA had raided camps of the Chin resistance forces at least three times. PDF Zoland, another Chin resistance group, also accused ZRA-EC of killing one of their leaders in December 2021.

In May 2024, the reports became more substantial, saying ZRA-EC was active in Tonzang and Tedim Townships in Chin State, and Kalay and Tamu Townships in Sagaing Region and that it was fighting the resistance forces in conjunction with the Burmese military. Battles broke out in Tonzang Township between Chin resistance forces consisting of CNA and CDFs against ZRA-EC and its allies, the Myanmar military. Tonzang residents said that ZRA-EC and the Myanmar military blockaded the town, preventing any evacuations. On 20 May 2024, Chin resistance forces captured Tonzang from ZRA-EC and Myanmar military. During the battle, a ZRA combatant and two junta policemen were captured alive by the Chin resistance.

On 19 May 2026, the ZRA-EC fought alongside Tatmadaw troops during the capture of Tonzang from CC forces.

== Organisational Structure ==
The founding president of ZRO in 1993 is mentioned as Khaijasong Guite (K. Guite) from the Karbi Anglong district in Assam. Later Thanglianpau Guite is mentioned as its president. According to a U.S. State Department cable, Thanglianpau was a general secretary of the Zomi National Congress in the Chin State, and was elected to the Parliament of Myanmar in 1990. Later, he was expelled from the party and migrated to India. The cable attributes the formation of both ZRO and ZRA to Thanglianpau.

The ZRA mainly conducts operations in the majority areas of Burma, and in the Churachandpur district of Manipur. A particular area of activity is the Singngat subdivision of Churachandpur near the Myanmar border. Their operational areas include bordering regions of Manipur and Mizoram. It also operates in Chin State of Myanmar under a so-called "ZRA Eastern Command".

The ZRA allegedly funds itself through the collection of "protection fees" from locals who live in its areas of operation. In exchange for this fee, the ZRA claims they protect locals from being shot, kidnapped, or robbed by rival groups. In June 2004, according to local media reports, the ZRA accused the Mizo National Front (MNF) administration in Mizoram of only partially paying ZRA cadres for campaigning on behalf of MNF candidates in Champhai. A prominent opposition leader in Mizoram, Lal Thanhawla, claimed that on 12 June 2004, the MNF owed the ZRA payment for "services rendered", and that, because the MNF had failed to pay, the ZRA had begun collecting fees from residents of Mizoram.

== Alliances with other insurgent groups ==
The ZRA maintains close alliances with the Kanglei Yawol Kanna Lup (KYKL) and the National Socialist Council of Nagaland-Isak Muivah (NSCN-IM). The group also has a memorandum of understanding with the Kuki Liberation Organization (KLO) that promises "full cooperation in all spheres, with the objective of strengthening the blood ties among the Kuki-Chin-Mizo/Zomi peoples". The ZRA was once in conflict with the Hmar People's Convention-Democracy (HPC-D), but the two groups reached an agreement to "work closely in the spirit of mutual understanding and cooperation for the welfare of the people and for achieving their shared objectives".

In 2019, ZRO was reported to be part of the United People's Front, an umbrella group of six or seven ethnic organisations with armed wings which were formed in the 1990s.

== Bibliography ==
- Go, Khup Za (2008), Zo Chronicles: A Documentary Study of History and Culture of the Kuki-Chin-Lushai Tribe, Mittal Publications, ISBN 9788183242103
- Haokip, Rebecca C. (2007). "The Kuki-Paite Conflict in the Churachandpur District of Manipur". In Lazar Jeyaseelan (ed.). Conflict Mapping and Peace Processes in North East India (PDF). North Eastern Social Research Centre. pp. 185–207. Archived from the original (PDF) on 18 December 2023.
- Haokip, T. S. Letkhosei (2018), Ethnicity and Insurgency in Myanmar/Burma: A Comparative Study of the Kuki-Chin and Karen Insurgencies, Educreation Publishing
- Rammohan, E. N. (April–June 2002), "Blueprint for Counterinsurgency in Manipur", The Journal of the United Services Institution of India, CXXXII, archived from the original on 15 February 2024
- Suan, H. Kham Khan (2011), "Rethinking 'tribe' identities: The politics of recognition among the Zo in north-east India", Contributions to Indian Sociology, 45 (2): 157–187, doi:10.1177/006996671104500201
- Zou, David Vumlallian (3–9 April 2010), "A Historical Study of the 'Zo' Struggle", Economic and Political Weekly, 45 (14): 56–63, JSTOR 25664306
- Zou, S. Thangboi (2012), "Emergent Micro-National Communities: The Logic of Kuki-Chin Armed Struggle in Manipur", Strategic Analysis, 36 (2): 315–327, doi:10.1080/09700161.2012.646509
