= Chinland =

Self-declared state within Myanmar

State of Chinland ချင်းပြည် (Burmese) Chinram (Hakha Chin)
- 2023–present
- Flag
- Anthem: Chin National Anthem
- Location of Chinland (dark green)
- Status: Autonomous self-governing polity (de jure); Independent state (de facto)
- Capital: Camp Victoria
- Official languages: Burmese; Kuki-Chin languages English
- Regional languages: Chin
- Ethnic groups: Chin, Rakhine, Burmese
- Demonym: Chin

Government
  - Chairman of Chinland Council: Pu Zing Cung
  - Prime Minister: Pu Pa Thang
- Legislature: Chinland Council

Establishment
  - Chin Hills Regulation Act: 13 August 1896
  - Chin Forum Initiative: 1998
  - Chinland Council: 13 April 2021
  - autonomy declared: 28 November 2023
  - Chinland Constitution: 6 December 2023

Area
  - Total: 36,018.8 km^{2} (13,906.9 sq mi)

Population
  - 2014 census: 578,801
  - Density: 16/km^{2} (41.4/sq mi)
- Currency: Kyat (K) (MMK)

Chinland, officially the State of Chinland, is an autonomous state and self-governing polity in Myanmar, Southeast Asia. Its claimed territory encompasses approximately one third of the Chin State in Northwestern Myanmar, along the borders with Bangladesh and India.

== History ==
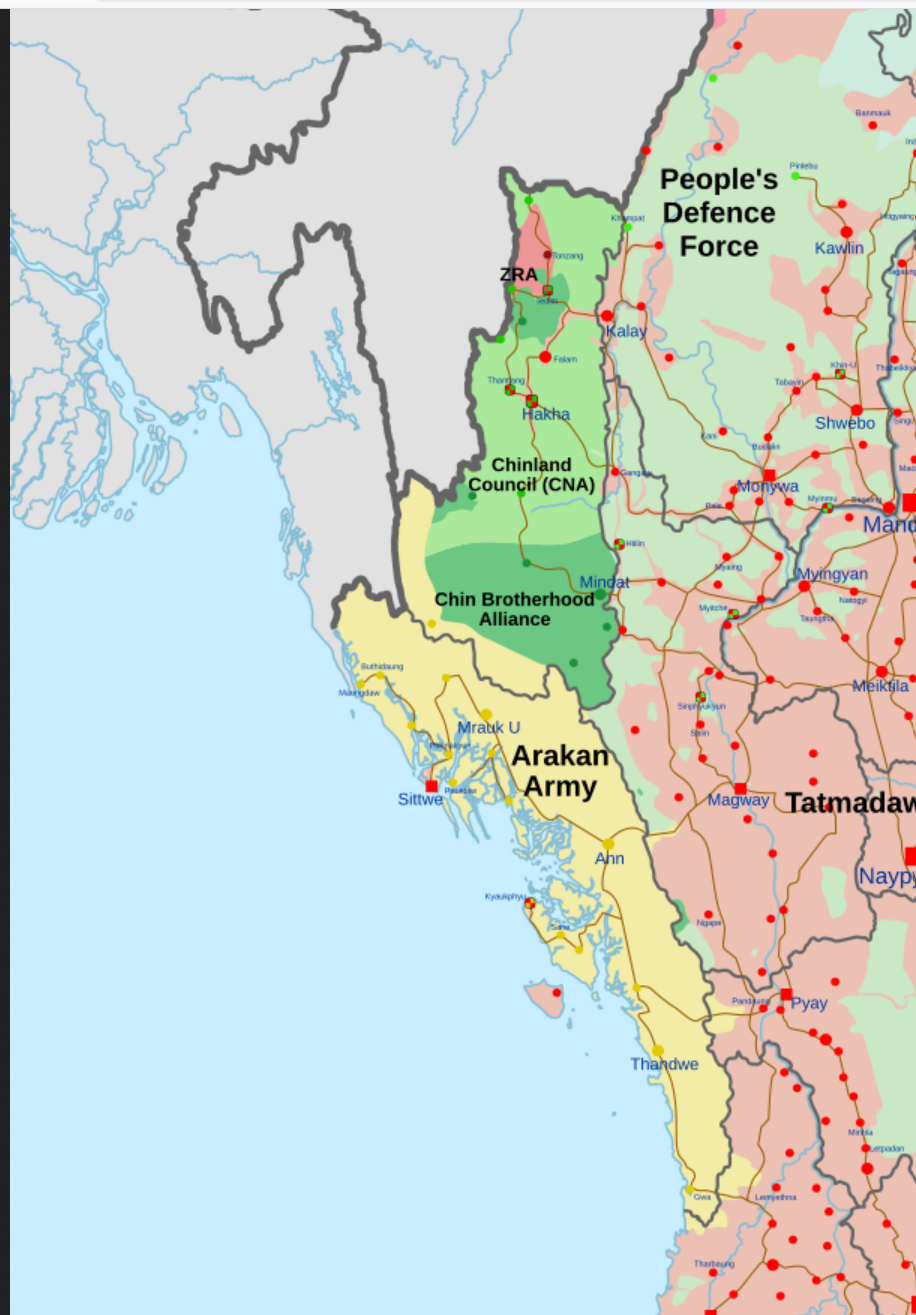
Areas controlled by Chinland and allies

The state was established following the adoption of the Chinland Constitution on 6 December 2023 by the Chin National Front (CNF) and local administration organisations, establishing the Chinland Council as its governing body and changing the former name of Chin State to Chinland. This constitution was objected to by resistance groups from 5 townships (Falam, Tedim, Kanpetlet, Mindat and Matupi) out of the 9 townships in Chin State. The constitution aimed at creating a nation state for the Chin people following the principles of self-determination with a "coming together federal vision", i.e., a bottom-up approach for the establishment of a future federal union in Myanmar.

The Chinland Council, composed of 27 CNF members, 14 MPs and 68 members of local administrations, received the support of 14 of the 17 recognised local administration organisations in Chin State, with the exception of Falam, Tedim, Kanpetlet, Mindat and Matupi.

On 17 May 2024, the National Unity Government and the Chinland Council held an online meeting for the first time. Although the details of the meeting were not stated, both parties agreed to hold more meetings in the future.

== Governance ==
Chinland's government is divided into three branches — executive, legislative and judiciary — overseen by the Chinland Council, which was established in accordance with the Chinland Constitution on 1 February 2024. The executive is expected to include 15 ministries, among which are ministries for Defense, Home Affairs, Foreign Affairs and Immigration.

The Chinland Constitution also establishes the Chin National Army as the state's only national army. Nonetheless, local administrations still maintain their own armed forces, most of them as part of the Chinland Defense Force and organised in the Chin Joint Defense Committee.

=== Administrative divisions ===
The townland and regional divisions of Chinland are as follows:

- Daai
- Falam
- Hakha
- Hualngoram
- Kanpetlet
- Lautu
- Matupi
- Mara
- Mindat
- Ngawn
- Paletwa
- Senthang
- Thantlang
- Zanniat
- Zophei
- Zotung

=== Symbols ===
The flag used by the Chinland Council is identical to that of the Chin National Front, which differs from the Chin State's previous flag. It consists of three horizontal bands of red, white and blue, charged with two hornbills in the center.

== Status ==
While claiming to strive for a "federal democratic union", the constitution did not discuss Chinland's status with respect to Myanmar, leading to speculation about potential separatism. However, the Chinland Council's constitution does explicitly state that a federal union is one of its main goals and that the Chinland Council and Government will work in coordination with the democratic National Unity Government, the National Unity Consultative Council, and other "federal units."

Furthermore, some members of the previous Interim Chin National Consultative Council, established in 2021, have rejected the authority of the Chinland Council, fearing a ratification of the constitution would lead to the dissolution of the ICNCC.

Moreover, the Chin community has had a mixed reaction to the formation of the Chinland Council. Many have hailed it as a milestone in Chin history, but others doubt its validity and inclusivity due to the absence of some stakeholders in its formation.

== Conflicts with other Chin groups ==
While the Chinland Council claims to be the sole representative of Chin interests, the establishment of Chinland has not been universally accepted within the Chin community. The Chin Brotherhood Alliance, formed on 30 December 2023, comprises several ethnic armed organizations active in Chin State, including the Chin National Defence Force, PDF-Zoland, and various Chinland Defense Forces. This alliance opposes the Chinland Council's authority, criticizing it for taking advantage of the conflict for territorial gains.

On 31 January 2024, tensions escalated when the Chinland Defense Forces (CDF), alongside the Chin National Army (CNA), launched an offensive against the Maraland Defence Force (MDF), a member of the Chin Brotherhood Alliance, following the alleged killing of a CNA soldier and detention of CDF-Mara soldiers by the MDF. Subsequent clashes occurred in Paletwa Township near the Chin State-Rakhine State border, underscoring the ongoing divisions and armed confrontations within Chinland.

On 20 May 2024, the Zomi Community of Queensland Inc. condemned the CNA for what they described as invading peaceful Zomi-inhabited areas in Myanmar through the villages of Muallum and Cingpikot in the Tedim, Tonzang, and Cikha townships, forcing villagers to flee and endure days without food or water. They emphasized that the Zomi, a peace-loving community, have endured the CNA's oppressive actions for the past 20 years and called for solidarity and condemnation of these actions, asserting that anyone supporting or funding the CNA's violence and human rights abuses is equally responsible for these atrocities.

== See also ==
- Wa State, another self-governing polity in Myanmar
