= Thantlang =

Thantlang ထန်တလန်မြို့ Thlantlang
- Town
- Location within Myanmar
- Coordinates: 22°41′57″N 93°25′41″E
- Country (de jure): Myanmar
- Division: Chin State
- District: Hakha District
- Township: Thantlang Township
- Country (de facto): Chinland
- Time zone: UTC+6.30 (MMT)

Thantlang (Burmese: ထန်တလန်မြို့, MLCTS: htan ta. lan mrui., pronounced [tʰàɰ̃təlàɰ̃ mjo̰]; also Thlantlang or Htantlang in Burmese transliteration) is a town and the administrative center of Thantlang Township in Chin State, Myanmar (formerly Burma).

== Names ==
Thantlang was formerly known as Thlan Tlang ("Cemetery Hill") for the many cemeteries on the city's west side. In 1983, the People's Council officially changed the name of the town to "Thantlang" ("Famous Hill").

== History ==
In February 2021, the Burmese armed forces staged the 2021 Myanmar coup d'état. Thantlang became the site of major local resistance, between the Chinland Defense Force, a local militia group formed in response to the coup, and the armed forces. In response, the Burmese military launched a major offensive. On 18 September, the military destroyed 18 buildings by shelling, leading to the exodus of thousands of residents. On 29 October, the Burmese military destroyed an additional 160 homes in the town, with collateral damage totaling USD $10-15 million. Over 10,000 Thantlang residents fled the town, seeking refuge in the countryside and the neighbouring Indian state of Mizoram.

By November 2022, much of Thantlang had been burned down.

== Geography and demographics ==
Thantlang is located 25 miles (40 km) from Hakha, the capital of Chin State. Thantlang sits between the Vuichip and Marau Mountains. The Kaladan River flows between Hakha and Thantlang before it swerves north through into India's Mizoram State and re-emerges in Paletwa, where it merges into the Bay of Bengal. Thantlang's borders extend to Mizoram's edge in India. The town's water flows in from the nearby Buhva and Lahva rivers. Paddy fields dot Lahva's banks, regularly plowed by local farmers in June and harvested by the end of October.

The township is constructed of over eighty neighbouring villages, surrounded by nine small regions: Khualhring, Vanzang, Zahnak, Bual, Vailam, Zophei, Bawipa Tlang, Lautu, and Mara. Thantlang provides space for the local governmental administrative offices, which serve all villages in that nine-region area. Roads in Thantlang township are mainly done by local villagers.

There are many different dialects in Thantlang but locals have no difficulty understanding each other.

== Education ==
The literacy rate of people from Thantlang is arguably one of the three highest within Chin State, mostly among people from Tedim and Falam. Since 2000, there have been some private tuition schools in Thantlang which have helped many students achieve higher grades to help them pass governmental issued exams. Older people are staunch supporters of education for the younger generations. Many local developments were done through local community labour as government never supports necessary rural and urban development. Most of the nine regions are not accessible by cars since no paved roads have been built by the government except for a few locally built roads. Many villagers travel by walking – which can take up to three days – to reach Thantlang proper in order to do their shopping.

== Tourism ==
There are many areas for tourists to visit within Thantlang. In the countryside are massive rocky mountains, such as the Lungding in Vanzang and Miepi Mountain and lingkhaw Mountain in West Zophei. Many historical locations, such as the Siapanglai well, are still maintained by local villagers.

== Festivals ==
Chin National Day (20 February, now banned by the Burmese regime) and Easter Sunday (known locally as "tho puai") are regular seasonal festivals. An annual football tournament is held among competitors from all nine regions ("taungkyaw bawlone pwe") held in the rainy season is the most exciting (to the residents of Thantlang)sports festival in Thantlang. Christmas is the grandest feast of the year. Local farmers, depending largely upon the two small rivers, grow vegetables such as cabbage, mustard, garlic, and onion, generally producing only enough for their own families but not the entire town's population.

== Centenary cross controversy ==
On 5 January 1999, the people of Thantlang erected a wooden cross monument on Vuichip Mountain with support from all of Chin State, commemorating one hundred years of living as Protestant Christians. However the military not only prevented them from celebrating the anniversary but proceeded to bulldoze the cross to the ground, imprisoning several pastors and any who protested. The regime erected a pagoda on the north hilltop over Thantlang, where a local Burmese monk stayed. By 2011, many people in Thantlang were planning to build a "Prayer House" on Vuichip Mountain so that all Christians could pray and observe fasting there freely.
