= Chin National Organisation =

Political party in Burma

The Chin National Organisation was a political party in Burma.

== History ==
Allied with the Clean AFPFL, the party contested the 1960 general elections, winning a single seat.
