= Matupi, Myanmar =

Matupi မတူပီ
- Town
- Nickname: Batupuei
- Location in Burma
- Coordinates: 21.6°N 93.4432°E
- Myanmar: Myanmar
- Division: Chin State
- District: Matupi District
- Township: Matupi Township

Area
  - Total: 2,316.8 sq mi (6,000 km^{2})
- Elevation: 3,560 ft (1,090 m)

Population (2020)
  - Total: 8,412
  - Density: 3.631/sq mi (1.402/km^{2})
  - Religions: Christianity
- Time zone: UTC+6.30 (MST)
- Climate: Cwa

Matupi (Burmese: မတူပီမြို့, MLCTS: ma. tu pi, pronounced [mətùbì mjo̰]) is the principal town of Matupi Township of Chin State in western Myanmar. Six major Chin tribes inhabit Matupi: the Matu, Mara (Tlosai, Hlaipao, Hawthai, Sizo, etc), Dai, Zotung, Lautuv and Khumi tribes.

== History ==
Among the villages in Chin State, Matupi (formerly known as Batupuei Village) was the biggest and most populous. The British Gazette mentioned that there were over 1,000 houses, including paddy barns, in the village of Batupuei between 1900 and 1930. Under British rule, the township was included in the Hakha district. The Ministry of Home and Religious Affairs granted Matupi the status of township on March 22, 1948.

Batu refers to the inhabitants of Matupi, Chin State, Myanmar (Burma). Batu is an ethnic group in Southern Chin State, named after descendants of Batu, the first settler at Batu village. The name Batupuei comes from Batu, the name of the first settler, and Puei meaning "great". According to some local experts from the Batu tribe, the name Matupi derived from Batupuei (Badupi); however, due to a misreading of the spelling: Ba into Ma and Puei into Pi in Burmese characters, Matupi became the most widely used name without any historical significance in its meaning.

The Batu tribe migrated from Central Burma or northern Matupi after moving place to place as the Chin people migrated from China. Some Chin people settled along the Chindwin River and Central Burma, while some continued to search for settlement in mountainous and hilly areas. Those Chin people who lived in plain areas called themselves "Asho Chin" and those settling in the western mountainous areas called themselves "Hilly Chin". The Batu tribe was one of the Chin tribes that used to live in the delta of the Chindwin River, before they moved to the western part of Burma.

The town was seized by the Chin Brotherhood alliance on 12 June 2024, during the Myanmar civil war. During subsequent clashes between the Brotherhood and the military, the Brotherhood also skirmished with the Chin National Army, with the two rival rebel groups blaming the other for instigating the fighting.

== Transportation ==
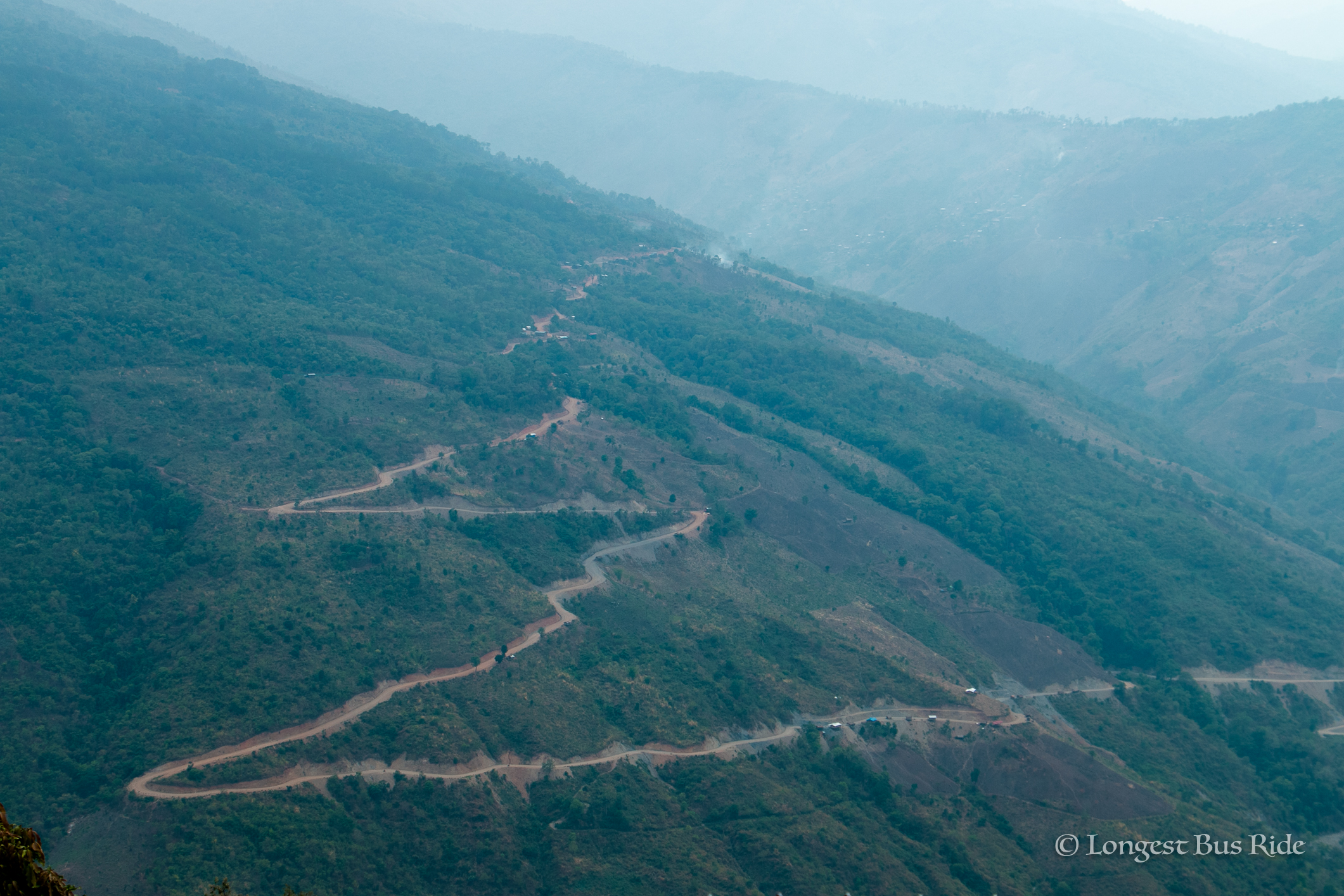
Road near Mindat, which lies between Matupi and Pakokku

There are two roads leading from Matupi. The first leads to Mindat and stretches 102 miles (164 km), and the second leads to Hakha township is (173 miles (278 km) long). Depending on the weather, there are buses that go back and forth between Pakokku located in Magway and Matupi on a weekly basis, although buses may travel between Matupi and Pakokku more than once a week as well.

Minibuses from Pakkokku's Junction 8 bus station depart for Matupi most mornings starting at 7 a.m., passing through Mindat. The road to Mindat is paved and windy and then semi-paved and much more bumpy from Mindat to Matupi. The minibuses return from Matupi to Pakokku each morning. The minibus from Pakokku to Matupi takes 12–18 hours, depending on weather, engine trouble, etc. Minibuses often caravan in groups of 2 to 4 or more to support each other in case of engine trouble or other issues, between Mindat and Matupi.

From time to time, private cars may also go between Pakokku and Matupi and vice versa.

Both roads leading to Matupi are not well-paved.

== Education ==
=== High schools ===
- No. 1 Basic Education of Matupi (Longvan ward)
- No 2. Basic Education of Matupi (Cangbong ward)
