= Mindat, Chin State =

Town in Chin State, Myanmar

Mindat မင်းတပ်
- Town
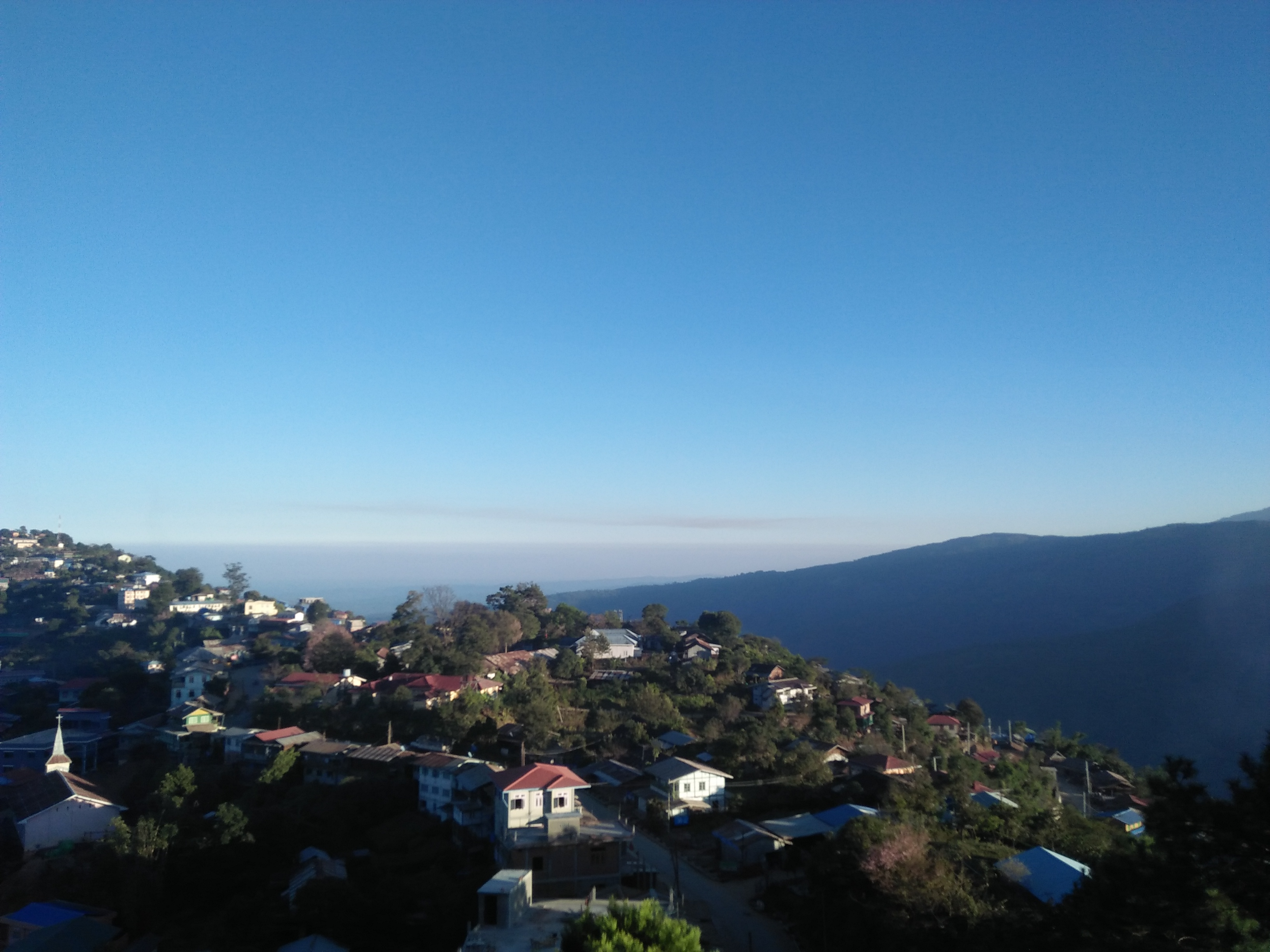

- Location in Myanmar
- Coordinates: 21°22′N 93°59′E
- Country: Myanmar
- Division: Chin State
- District: Mindat District
- Township: Mindat Township

Population (2014)
  - Town: 46,008
  - Urban: 10,932
  - Metro: 35,076
- Time zone: UTC+6.30 (MST)
- Climate: Cwa

Mindat (Burmese: မင်းတပ်မြို့, MLCTS: mang: tap mrui., pronounced [mɪ́ɰ̃daʔ mjo̰]) is a town in Chin State of western Myanmar (Burma). It is the administrative seat of Mindat Township and Mindat District. The inhabitants speak the Kʼchò language.

== History ==
In 2021, the town was the site of the battle of Mindat during the Myanmar civil war (2021–present).

== People ==
The people living in Mindat are called K'Cho (Cho), who are divided into 3 regions: Mün, Daai, and Kaang. The K'Cho people are known for their rare tradition of females having their faces tattooed. However, this tradition has not been practiced since 1962, and face tattoos are now seen only on elderly women. Beginning in the early 21st century, many of the K'Cho people have migrated to many different parts of the world, including the United States, Australia, Denmark, Norway, New Zealand, Malaysia, and other countries.

- A girl would decide when she was ready to have her face tattooed. She would take an offering to the woman who gave the tattoos.
- The entire face could be tattooed in as little as an hour. The time depended on how many breaks the girl needed, since it is a painful procedure. The time is estimated, since they did not have clocks in those days.
- Their face tattoo is done with black ink from charcoal mixed with some other things to keep it safe for the skin, and is done with lime/lemon/cane thorns.

== Climate ==
Mindat has a humid subtropical climate (Köppen climate classification Cwa). Temperatures are warm for most of the year, but the winter months (November–February) are cooler. There is a winter dry season (December–May) and a summer wet season (June–November).

Climate data for Mindat, elevation 1,395 m (4,577 ft), (1991–2020)
Month	Jan	Feb	Mar	Apr	May	Jun	Jul	Aug	Sep	Oct	Nov	Dec	Year
Record high °C (°F)	26.7 (80.1)	32.2 (90.0)	34.9 (94.8)	35.7 (96.3)	37.0 (98.6)	33.6 (92.5)	31.0 (87.8)	29.9 (85.8)	29.7 (85.5)	28.8 (83.8)	28.1 (82.6)	26.5 (79.7)	37.0 (98.6)
Mean daily maximum °C (°F)	21.2 (70.2)	24.9 (76.8)	28.6 (83.5)	30.5 (86.9)	28.4 (83.1)	25.7 (78.3)	25.5 (77.9)	24.9 (76.8)	24.5 (76.1)	23.9 (75.0)	22.3 (72.1)	20.4 (68.7)	24.8 (76.6)
Daily mean °C (°F)	15.4 (59.7)	18.6 (65.5)	22.2 (72.0)	24.1 (75.4)	23.2 (73.8)	22.0 (71.6)	21.6 (70.9)	21.2 (70.2)	20.6 (69.1)	19.7 (67.5)	17.4 (63.3)	14.9 (58.8)	20.1 (68.2)
Mean daily minimum °C (°F)	9.6 (49.3)	12.3 (54.1)	15.8 (60.4)	17.7 (63.9)	18.1 (64.6)	18.3 (64.9)	17.8 (64.0)	17.5 (63.5)	16.7 (62.1)	15.4 (59.7)	12.4 (54.3)	9.4 (48.9)	15.1 (59.2)
Record low °C (°F)	2.4 (36.3)	4.9 (40.8)	7.5 (45.5)	9.6 (49.3)	10.7 (51.3)	12.2 (54.0)	11.8 (53.2)	12.2 (54.0)	10.7 (51.3)	8.0 (46.4)	5.1 (41.2)	3.2 (37.8)	2.4 (36.3)
Average precipitation mm (inches)	7.7 (0.30)	4.2 (0.17)	13.8 (0.54)	29.6 (1.17)	173.4 (6.83)	203.4 (8.01)	197.2 (7.76)	290.5 (11.44)	341.0 (13.43)	228.4 (8.99)	43.8 (1.72)	9.7 (0.38)	1,542.7 (60.74)
Average precipitation days (≥ 1.0 mm)	0.8	0.6	1.4	4.7	13.1	18.0	18.4	21.4	20.7	15.1	4.6	1.4	120.2
Source 1: World Meteorological Organization
Source 2: Norwegian Meteorological Institute (extremes)

== Geography ==
The main part of the town runs along the ridge of a mountain. The paved road runs from Pakokku to Matupi.

== Transport ==
=== Bus ===
There is a bus station with direct buses to Pakokku or Matupi. These run mainly in the morning. The Pakokku bus route is approximately 4.5 hours, and the Matupi bus route is approximately 5 hours.

=== Walking trails ===
Before the road was built and regular bus service began, students walked from Mindat to the advanced schools in Pakokku. The route was a walking trail and took 2 to 3 days.

== Religion ==
Religion in Mindat (2014)
1. Christianity (52.3%)
2. Buddhism (47.0%)
3. Atheist (0.65%)

There are various religions in the town. Missionaries walk or motorbike to outlying villages to convert people.

=== Catholicism ===
There is a Catholic church, which maintains a nursery school and living quarters for the elderly.

=== Buddhism ===
There are three Buddhist monasteries: one in the Western Quarter, another in the Sanpya Quarter, and the last one in the Eastern Quarter.

== Notable residents ==
- San Yu Htwe, Olympic archer in the 2016 Summer Olympics
