= Matupi Township =

Coordinates: 21.5833°N 93.4333°E

Matupi Township မတူပီမြို့နယ်
- Township
- Location in Matupi district (in red)
- Country: Burma
- State: Chin State
- District: Matupi District
- Time zone: UTC+6:30 (MST)

Matupi Township (Burmese: မတူပီမြို့နယ်; also batupui Township) is a township of Matupi District in the Chin State of Burma (Myanmar). Matupi is the administrative center for the township.

== Geography ==
=== Location ===
The Matupi township is located in western Myanmar. The town is situated between latitudes 21.36'57.93 north and longitude 93.26'21.09 east. Matupi township is bordered: to the east by the Magwe division; to the south by Mindat Township; to the south-west by Paletwa township; to the north-west by Mizoram State, India; and to the north by Thantlang and Hakha townships.

=== Environment ===
The whole region is made up of high hills and deep valleys. Matupi township measures about 68 miles (109 km) from north to south, 47 miles (76 km) from east to west. It has an area of about 2,316.8 square miles (6,000 km^{2}). The township sits at 3,560 feet (1,090 m) above sea level. The highest mountain located in the township is Awtaraw Mountain, which is 9,009 feet tall, and the second highest is Lukil Mountain, standing at 8,408 feet, followed by Mount Kaisitlang, which is also in the region.

Most rivers and streams in the township are fed by water from the hills and mountain ranges. The major rivers within the township are the Bunglong (Lemro) and Bawinu Rivers. The rivers contain rapids and whitewater, and thus are not suitable for navigation. Only small boats and canoes can travel in certain sections, mainly downstream. The main streams are Pengsawng, Kadi, Leatsa, Tilak, Tisi and Vawmpu Streams. Bungtla Waterfall is located in Matupi township. Awisi Lake is located near Rhueng village.

=== Weather ===
December and January are the coldest months of the year, with a mean temperature of around 10−20 °C, the winter months are generally colder and windier. April is the hottest month with a mean of 37 °C. Total rainfall is about 89.22 inches (2,266 mm) every year. Occasionally, the temperature can drop to 2 °C.

=== Agriculture ===
Matupi is rich in plant life and vegetation. About one-eighth of Matupi is covered by tropical and sub-tropical forests, containing palm and bamboo among others. Areas of the forest have been cleared for cultivation, but many scrub forests, high grass areas and reeds remain. Dogs, pangolin, porcupines, tigers, leopards, bears, many species of monkeys, and other species thrive across the region's forests. The hornbill is one of the most notable birds found in the forests of Matupi township.

Agriculture is the most essential and profitable industry in the Matupi Township, employing more than 90% of the population. Common crops include rice, wheat, corn, millet, pulses, oilseeds, coffee, oranges, damson, potatoes, and natural fibres. However, Matupi still depends on the import of rice supplies from the lowlands. Although the primary occupation is agriculture, the industry is not well developed due to the scarcity of large valleys and plains. Shifting cultivation is still prevalent. Terraced cultivation is slowly being introduced along the hillsides. Due to difficult terrain, human labor is the main driving force of the work done. Teak and other hardwoods are found at elevation below 900 metres (3,000 ft). Oaks and pines grow at altitudes above 900 metres (3,000 ft). Teak, pines, canes, resin and turpentine are important forest products. Since electricity is not available in most villages, people depend on firewood for cooking. Forestry is also a main source of income.

== Wards ==
There are four wards in Matupi: Ngala Ward, Longvan ward, Khoboi ward, and Cangbong ward. Among these wards Ngala, Longvan and Khoboi ward are the major places where the following clans reside: Hmanrhing, Laithang, Longla, Oitoe, Rhalawk, Rhinguet, Sampok, Takluem, Taknan, Thanghul, Thangkhoeng, Thintuep, Tlungma, Tuimuk and Zungpoeih These fourteen clans are called Batu. They speak the same language, Batu or Batupuei.

== Demographics and culture ==
The demographics of Matupi township are very diverse, with many different Chin tribes residing in the area. In the Matupi township, there are 6 major tribes namely Matu, Dai, Zotung, Lautuv, Khumi and Mara (Hlaipao, Tlosai, Hawthai etc.). All these major tribes in the Matupi township have their own unique culture and language, which is common in Chin State. However, all these tribes also speak the Matupi language ("Batu") dialect, which is used as a lingua franca. According to the 2009 local census, the total population of Matupi township was 50,580 and 6,630 houses in Matupi township.

=== Religious make-up ===
Christianity is adhered to by an overwhelming majority of the population (approximately 98%), and the rest are mainly Buddhists or animists. Many Matupi people have also served as missionaries and pastors in places like the United States, Australia, India, south-east Asia, and in the Pacific island nations. They also carry out missionary activity inside Myanmar. Among Christians, Baptists are the predominant group, constituting more than 60% of the township's population. Christian Reformed, Catholics, Revivalists, Presbyterian, Seventh-day Adventist, The Church of The Living God (thlangbol) and Pentecostals are the other Christian denominations. Catholics are found in significant numbers in parts of the township. Matupi is the fastest-growing Christian area in Chin State. There is one Theological College in Matupi.

=== Language ===
The people in Matu speak several Matupi dialects, called "Matupi ol”. Almost all the tribes of Matupi have their own dialect or language. The traditional languages do not have any script of their own, so missionaries used Roman script to transcribe them. The Matupi dialect is distinctive but also has similarities to other Chin dialects.

The most common Matu dialect spoken in Matupi is the "Batu" dialect, spoken by the majority Batu people. Chin dialects are mutually understandable (Haka dialect can be understood by Htantlang, Tiddim dialect can be used to communicate with Tonzang dialect, etc.).

=== Tourism ===
The Mindat and Matupi area have been open to foreigners since May 2016. Travel to Matupi Township mainly occurs by car, through poorly maintained roads that cut along the mountainsides and valleys. Due to the rough terrain and rugged nature of the landscape, travel can be difficult. Landslides are common especially during the rainy season. In certain areas, cars have to carry shovels to clear landslides and/or fallen rocks. Matu villagers usually travel daily on foot from village to village and/or to and from the farms.

== Military council ==
In November 2022, the military council in Mutupi designated seven villages in the township as "red": အမ်ဆွေး (Awmsawi), မားဒူ (Mardu), ဝလံပီ (Walumpi), ဝလံတဲ (Walumte), လာလွီး (Lalui), လွီဗန် (Luivan), and ရဲန်ရောင်း (Leung Raung). These villages would have travel restrictions and were under increased threat of military action.
