= Chin National Front =

Chin National Front ချင်းအမျိုးသားတပ်ဦး
- Chairman: Pu Zing Cung
- General Secretary: Salai Thla Hei
- Founded: 20 March 1988
- Headquarters: Camp Victoria
- Military wing: Chin National Army
- Ideology: Chin nationalism Minority rights
- National affiliation: United Nationalities Federal Council; National Unity Consultative Council
- Colors: Red, White, Blue
- Slogan: Self-determination, Federalism, and Democracy

Party flag

Website
- http://www.cnfhqr.org/

The Chin National Front (Burmese: ချင်းအမျိုးသားတပ်ဦး; CNF) is a Chin nationalist political organization in Myanmar. According to its website, its armed wing, the Chin National Army (CNA), fights the government of Myanmar. The group was founded on 20 March 1988. This organization claims to seek a Federal Union based on self-determination, ethnic equality and democracy. The Chin people are one of the four founding members (Chin, Kachin, Shan, and Bamar) of the Union of Burma. In 2021, CNF became a member of the National Unity Consultative Council.

== History ==
The group was founded by the Chin people on 20 March 1988, following unsuccessful attempts at armed resistance. The founders were Pu Tial Khal, Pu Lian No Thang (L) and Pu Roenga (L) at Tatkawng Veng, India on 20 February 1988. Pu Tial Khal was President. Pu No Than Kap was directed to join the National Democratic Front (NDF) to KNU headquarters soon after it was founded. Pu No Than Kap became CNF President until he was forcefully expelled.

From 1996 to 2003, the CNF became an urban guerrilla organisation. The CNF recruited from rural groups in the mid-1990s after further funding issues. After 1995, the CNF became responsive to the human rights issues of the Tatmadaw in the cities and launched guerrilla attacks. Many of these operations consisted of bombings planted at officers' and administrative residences. The guerrilla movement sustained itself until 2003, when the smuggling of weapons stopped. In 1995, the CNF also established the Chin Human Rights Organization to lobby for human rights, democracy and rights restoration of the Chin and other minorities.

=== 2026 ===
On 30 March 2026, the CNF joined the newly-formed Steering Council for the Emergence of a Federal Democratic Union (SCEF) with the Kachin Independence Organisation, Karenni State Interim Executive Council, Karen National Union, National Unity Government, and the Committee Representing Pyidaungsu Hluttaw.

On 31 July 2026, Min Aung Hlaing mentioned the CNF as taking part in peace talks during a Pyidaungsu Hluttaw session. CNF representatives denied the assertion as a "divide-and-rule tactic". Pu Zing Cung and a representative, John David, resigned after allegations surfaced that the negotiations were not approved by CNF command.

== Central Executive Committee members ==
The Central Executive Committee members of the Eighth Party Conference (2024-2028) of the Chin National Front are:

1. Pu Zing Cung, Chairman
2. Pu Thang Ning Kee, Vice Chairman One
3. Dr. Sui Khar, Vice Chairman Two
4. Pu Thang Yen, Vice Chairman Three
5. Salai Thla Hei, General Secretary
6. Salai Ram Kulh Cung, Assistant General Secretary One
7. Salai Htet Ni, Assistant General Secretary Two
8. Pu HC Ral Hnin, Assistant General Secretary Three
9. Pu Solomon Thang Ding, Member
10. Salai Bawi Lian Mang, Member
11. Pu Teihranga, Member
12. Pu Bil Cung, Member
13. Pi Leng Kee, Member
14. Salai Biak Pum, Member
15. Pu Thawng Za Lian, Member
16. Salai Kyaw Aung, Member
17. Pu Khua Uk Lian, Member
18. Pi Vel Ngei Chin, Member
19. Brig. Ngun Hlei Thang, Member

== Ceasefire agreements ==
The Chin National Front signed a state level preliminary "Ceasefire Agreement" with the Chin State government on 6 January 2012, the first Union level ceasefire agreement with Union level peace negotiation team on 7 May 2012. A second Union level "Ceasefire Agreement" with the Union Peacemaking Work Committee came on 9 December 2012.

== Platform ==
The Chin National Front stated that they are not based on a class of people, a religious belief, a region or an ideology but work for the Chin people. The Chin National Front welcomes and invites any nation, state, organization, and individuals to join in the effort to restore democracy, freedom and federalism in the Union of Burma.

== Relationships ==
CNF

- are a member of the National Democratic Front (NDF), composed of non-Burman nationalities/ NDF was formed in 1976 to establish a federal union based on a democratic system supporting equality and self-determination. The Chin National Front is a member and actively implements the NDF's objectives.
- are a member of the Democratic Alliance of Burma, which aims to restore democracy, freedom, and establish a federal union. The Democratic Alliance of Burma was formed on 14 November 1988 by 18 democratic forces.
- are a member of the National Council of the Union of Burma (NCUB). The NCUB is an alliance of the National Democratic Front, Democratic Alliance of Burma, National Coalition Government of the Union of Burma, and National League for Democracy (Liberated Area). It was formed in 1992 to restore democracy, freedom, and establish federal union. NUCB is a member of Council of Asian Liberals.
- became a signatory of the Geneva Call by signing a Deed of Commitment on 31 July 2006. Geneva Call is an international humanitarian organization dedicated to engaging armed non-state actors in mine-ban action. It provides a complementary mechanism to the Convention on anti-personnel mines, including the Ottawa Convention.

The Chin National Army is the military wing of the Chin National Front. It strictly applies the modified Geneva Military Code of Conduct and other international military norms and codes. CNA provides security for the Chin National Front.

== See also ==
- Internal conflict in Myanmar
- List of rebel groups in Myanmar
- Zogam
- Chinland

== Sources ==
- Tong, Lei (2025). Ethnic Insurgency of Myanmar: Resilience and Fragility. Northern Illinois University (Doctor of Philosophy thesis). Illinois. ProQuest 3246076852.
