= Chinland Defense Force =

Insurgent group fighting against the junta in Myanmar

- ချင်းဒေသကာကွယ်ရေးတပ်ဖွဲ့
- Flag of the Chinland Defense Force
- Founded: 4 April 2021
- Dates active: 4 April 2021 – present
- Country: Myanmar
- Allegiance: Myanmar
- Groups: CDF Kanpetlet; CDF Mindat; CDF Hakha; CDF Matupi; CDF Paletwa; CDF Thantlang; CDF Mara; CDF Zanniat; CDF Zotung; CDF Zophei; CDF Lautu; CDF Senthang; CDF Tonzang; PDF Zoland; CDF Hualngoram; CDF (CDM) Siyin; CDF KKG; CDF Daai; CNO/CNDF (Falam); Asho Chin defence force (ACDF)
- Active regions: Chinland; Magway Region; Sagaing Region; India-Myanmar border
- Ideology: Federalism; Democracy; Minority rights

The Chinland Defense Force (Burmese: ချင်းဒေသကာကွယ်ရေးတပ်ဖွဲ့, romanized: Chīn Deithạ Kakweyēi Tathpwẹ, lit. 'Chin Region Defense Army'; abbreviated: CDF) is a rebel group in Myanmar. It was formed in response to the 2021 Myanmar coup d'état to protect Chin State from the military junta. The CDF claims that they do not attack the military without cause and that they always issue a warning, such as releasing detainees and refraining from using violence against civilians. If the military does not respond, guerrilla or other action follows. They promise to return their weapons and disband if the revolution is successful. CDFs are members of CJDC (Chinland Joint Defense Committee). Chinland Joint Defense Committee (CJDC) is formed to serve Chin people's security services and protect an enemy from the illegal Myanmar Army. The total strength of active personnel under the command of CJDC is approximated to be around 15,000. From August to October 2021, it was reported that at least 40 clashes occurred between junta troops and CDF in various townships. CJDC claimed that at least 1,029 Tatmadaw soldiers were killed in the clashes and lost 58 of their own in 2021.

== History ==
Following the February 2021 coup in Myanmar, many protests occurred against the new military junta. Coup opponents peacefully protested by banging pots and pans at night and staging online and offline strikes. The Military Council responded harshly using violence to quell the protests, arresting citizens and torching homes. Civilian militias began to spring up throughout the country to oppose the coup and to ensure the safety of their own areas. Two ethnic armed organizations operated in Chin State, the Chin National Front's Chin National Army and the Zomi Revolutionary Army. However, the groups were unable to properly reach and safeguard the Chin townships, prompting the formation of the Chinland Defense Force on 4 April 2021.

=== Chin Infighting ===
On 31 January 2024, the CDF-Mara, CDF-Paletwa, CDF-Thantlang, CDF–Zophei, CDF-Lautu, and CDF–Senthang, alongside the Chin National Army (CNA), launched an offensive on Chin Brotherhood Alliance member the Maraland Defence Force after the MDF reportedly killed a CNA soldier and detained several CDF-Mara soldiers.

== Goals ==
The Chinland Defense Force's stated goals are to protect civilians from the ruling military junta, abolition of the 2008 Constitution of Myanmar, an end to military rule, and the establishment of a federal union.

== Weapons ==
The Chinland Defense Force has used small arms such as the M-16, AK (Kalashnikov), MA-1, MA-15, Type 81, and Tu Mee hunting rifles. International importers bring M-16s and AK-47 rifles into Myanmar.
