= Chin National Army =

Ethnic armed organization in Myanmar

- ချင်းအမျိုးသားတပ်မတော်
- Flag of the Chin National Army
- Leaders: Brigadier Ngun Hlei Thang, Chief of Staff; Colonel Pan Tui, Vice Chief of Staff
- Dates active: 14 November 1988 – present
- Headquarters: Camp Victoria
- Active regions: Chinland, Kachin, Kalay, Kabaw and Gangaw
- Ideology: Chin nationalism Federalism
- Size: 8,000+ (2024); 10,000+ (Auxiliaries)
- Part of: Chin National Front
- Wars: the Internal conflict in Myanmar

The Chin National Army (Burmese: ချင်းအမျိုးသားတပ်မတော်; abbreviated CNA) is a Chin ethnic armed organisation in Myanmar (Burma). It is the armed wing of the Chin National Front (CNF), and was founded on 20 March 1988 alongside it. The CNA signed a ceasefire agreement with the government of Myanmar on 6 January 2012.

The CNA is a member of the United Nationalities Federal Council, a coalition of opposition groups whose goal is to establish a federal system in Myanmar, or achieve levels of autonomy and peace amongst the various ethnic minorities in the country.

== History ==
=== Activities before 2021 ===
On 14 November 1988, the Chin National Front formed the Chin National Army, its political wing, by Chin students fleeing persecution after 8888 Uprising. India's Research and Analysis Wing provided them with assistance in acquiring weaponry. They established a base in Mizoram, which they maintained until 2005.
