= Ethnicity in Myanmar =

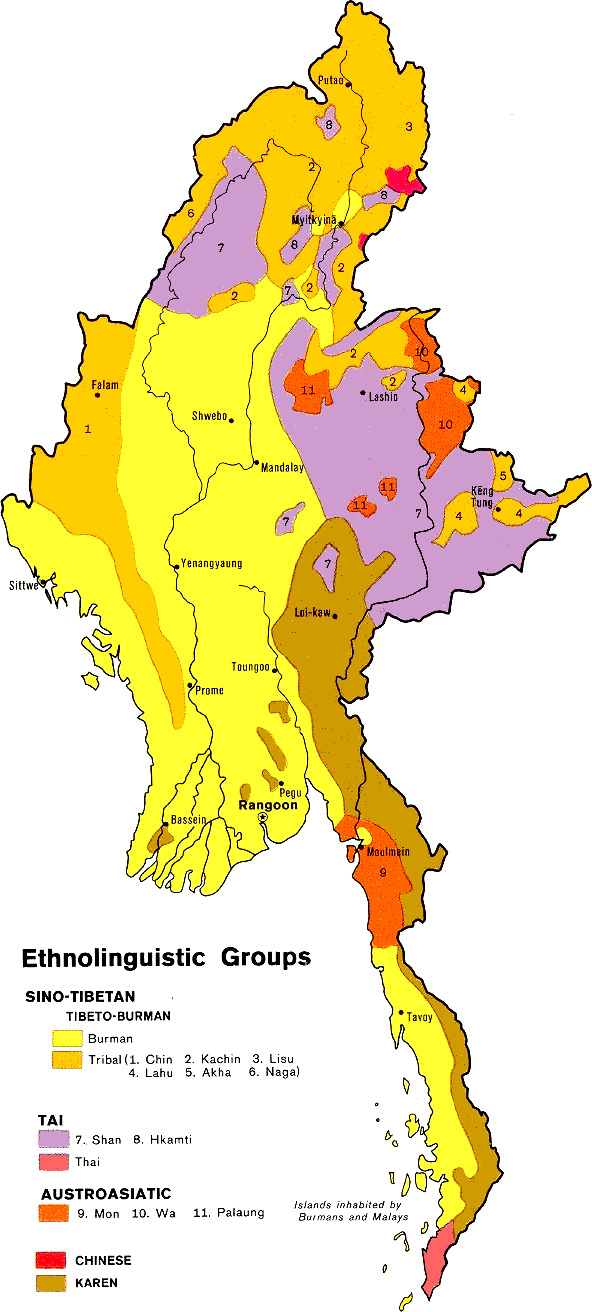
Map of ethnolinguistic groups based on the 1972 Burmese census. Burman Tribal (Chin, Kachin, Lisu, Lahu, Akha, Naga) Shan / Hkamti Thai Mon / Wa / Palaung Chinese Karen Note: Other ethnic groups like Rakhine, Kayah, Pa’O and Shanni might not appear on this map because the government merged sub ethnic groups into a large single ethnic group. (i.e. Kayah and Pa’O are Karen sub-groups so the government merged them into a one single ethnic identity.)

Myanmar (Burma) is an ethnically diverse nation with 135 distinct ethnic groups officially recognised by the Burmese government, which are grouped into eight "major national ethnic races"—the Bamar, Kayin, Rakhine, Shan, Mon, Chin, Kachin, and Karenni. The Bamar (Burman) make up approximately 68% of the population, while the remainder belongs to various major and minor ethnic and linguistic groups.

The "major national ethnic races" are grouped primarily according to geographic region rather than ethnolinguistic affiliation. For example, the Shan national race includes 33 ethnic groups that live in Shan State and speak languages in at least four language families. Myanmar's contemporary politics around ethnicity surround treating ethnicity as a minoritising discourse, pitting a "pan-ethnic" national identity against minority groups. Ethnic identities in practice are often flexible—sometimes as flexible as simply changing clothes—in part due to a lack of religious or ethnic stratification prior to British colonialism.

Ethnic identity in modern-day Myanmar has been significantly shaped by British colonial rule, Christian missionaries, and decolonisation in the post-independence era. To this day, the Burmese language does not have precise terminology that distinguishes the European concepts of race and ethnicity; the term lu-myo (လူမျိုး, lit. 'type of person') can reference race, ethnicity, and religion. For instance, many Bamar self-identify as members of the 'Buddhist lu-myo' or the 'Myanmar lu-myo,' which has posed a significant challenge for census-takers.

Many unrecognised ethnic groups exist in the country, the largest being the Burmese Chinese and Panthay (who together form 3% of the population), Burmese Indians (who form 2% of the population), Rohingya, Anglo-Burmese, and Gurkha. There are no official statistics regarding the population of the latter two groups, although unofficial estimates place around 52,000 Anglo-Burmese in Burma with around 1.6 million outside the country.

== History ==
=== Pre-colonial era ===
Classical Burmese literature often features a list of 101 nations or tribes of the known world as perceived by the Burmese people. In the pre-colonial era, ethnic identity was fluid and dynamic, marked by patron-client relationships, religion, and regional origins rather than strict ethnicity. Lowland valley populations were mainly Theravada Buddhists who spoke Burmese and practiced settled rice cultivation, while minority groups in the surrounding highlands had distinct cultures based on shifting cultivation and local clan or kinship-based loyalties. Pre-colonial Burmese kingdoms were defined by cultural exchange and contact, especially between the Buddhist Bamar, Shan, Rakhine and Mon peoples. Peripheral groups were more likely to adopt the cultural norms and institutions of dominant centers of power, like the Kingdom of Ava.

The Konbaung dynasty incorporated diverse peoples—such as the Shan, Mon, Arakanese, and Tai—into its Theravada Buddhist cultural system through rituals, religious monuments, and royal merit practices. Provincial leaders were required to participate in royal ceremonies, spreading court culture across regions. Intermarriage between the central court and provincial elites also strengthened this cultural integration, making Burmese Theravada orthodoxy a hegemonic force across the empire.

=== British colonial rule ===
During British rule in Burma (1896–1948), colonial authorities developed formal classifications to label groups of people, using language as a key criterion, which led to inconsistencies—for instance, some groups labeled as Kachin were not linguistically, ethnically, or racially related to others.

The British transformed the previously fluid nature of ethnic identity by categorizing people based on language in census records and linking ethnic groups to specific territories. They divided the colony into “Ministerial Burma” (directly ruled lowland areas populated mostly by the Bamar, Mon, and Rakhine) and “Frontier Areas” (indirectly ruled highlands inhabited by ethnic minorities like the Kachin, Shan, Chin, and Karen), which reinforced ethnic divisions and limited political interaction.

Christian missionaries converted many minority groups—especially the Karen, Kachin, and Chin—creating religious divides with the Buddhist Bamar majority. These groups also benefited more from colonial recruitment into military and civil service, intensifying Bamar resentment. Economic and political tensions further escalated due to mass immigration encouraged by the British, particularly of Indians and Chinese. Colonial historiography helped perpetuate ethnic categories in Burma, which in turn became the criteria for conceptualizing and organizing Myanmar's precolonial history.

These colonial developments promulgated the creation of pan-ethnic identities among minority groups like the Karen, Chin, and Kachin, while politically sidelining the Bamar majority, fueling future ethnic armed resistance and communal violence. For instance, Tai peoples in the country, who now identify as part of the Shan ethnic group, became a distinct ethno-cultural community only during British colonial rule with the creation of the “Shan States” in 1886.

During World War II, the Bamar nationalists aligned with Japan to expel British colonial rulers, while many minority groups supported the British. In 1947, independence leader Aung San secured minority support with promises of autonomy in the 1947 Panglong Agreement, but his assassination later that year destabilised the burgeoning movement.

=== Decolonisation ===
After independence, postcolonial Burmese governments adopted rigid colonial ethnic classifications, officially recognizing 135 “national races” called taing-yin-tha (တိုင်းရင်းသား). These identities have become the basis for citizenship and access to rights. The 1982 citizenship law reserved full citizenship for those classified as taing-yin-tha, effectively excluding groups like the Rohingya.

These imposed identities often grouped diverse subgroups together and became institutionalised over time, with post-independence governments continuing to use them to determine access to territory, political power, and economic opportunities—leading to ongoing grievances and struggles among excluded groups. These ethnic classifications have been criticised as arbitrary and exclusionary. While some blame ethnic diversity for ongoing military rule and conflict, the country's political institutions and elite actions have politicised ethnic identities and deepened divisions and conflict.

Ideological disputes and unmet promises to ethnic minorities led to ongoing civil wars between the central government and ethnic armed organisations. During the 1962 Burmese coup d'état, General Ne Win seized power to halt perceived threats of secession and further minority concessions. Consequently, Myanmar has faced continuous armed struggles between the Bamar-majority central government and minority ethnic groups demanding greater autonomy. Harsh military rule and brutal campaigns against ethnic insurgencies have resulted in the death or displacement of hundreds of thousands, and pushed many into refugee camps, particularly in Thailand.

The 1948 Constitution of Burma granted statehood to Kachin, Karenni (now Kayah), Shan and Karen States (now Kayin). The 1974 Constitution granted statehood to Chin State by upgrading its former status as the Special Division of the Chins, to Mon State by carving up the upper half of Tenasserim Division, and to Arakan State by upgrading its former status as Arakan Division. In 2010, in accordance with the 2008 Constitution, several ethnic groups were granted self-administered zones:

- Danu Self-Administered Zone: consisting of Ywangan and Pindaya townships in Shan State
- Kokang Self-Administered Zone: consisting of Konkyan and Laukkai townships in Shan State
- Naga Self-Administered Zone: consisting of Leshi, Lahe, and Namyun townships in Sagaing Region
- Pa Laung Self-Administered Zone: consisting of Namhsan and Manton townships in Shan State
- Pa-O Self-Administered Zone: consisting of Hopong, Hsihseng, and Pinlaung townships in Shan State
- Wa Self-Administered Division: consisting of Hopang, Mongmao, Panwai, Nahpan, Metman, and Pangsang (Pankham) townships in Shan State

== Ethnic makeup ==
Ethnic composition of Myanmar
Ethnic group	Percentage
Bamar	68.5%
Kayin	6.6%
Shan	4.7%
Rakhine	4.3%
Mon	2.1%
Chin	2.1%
Pa-O	2.1%
Kachin	1.5%
Ta'ang	0.6%
Danu	0.6%
Lahu	0.5%
Kokang	0.4%
Karenni	0.4%
Others	5.8%
Source: 2019 GAD township reports

After the 2014 Census in Myanmar, the Burmese government indefinitely withheld release of detailed ethnicity data, citing concerns around social unrest and political sensitivity surrounding the issue of ethnicity in Myanmar. In February 2018, Thein Swe, the Minister of Labor, Immigration, and Population did not provide a timeline, and stated that more discussions with ethnic leaders, historians, anthropologists, and cultural experts were necessary to finalise the terminology and classifications of ethnic groups. As of March 2018, the census data remains unreleased.

In 2022, researchers analysed the General Administration Department's nationwide township reports compiled between October 2018 and September 2019 to tabulate the ethnic makeup of the country.

The GAD used only 22 ethnic groups in its reports, reflecting the lack of standardisation within the Burmese government to classify ethnic groups, and disaggregation of several "national races." The GAD's list includes entries not found in the country's 135 officially recognised ethnic groups, including Mong Wong, Lishaw, and Ying.

== Officially recognised ethnic groups ==
The Burmese government recognises 8 "national races" that are made up of 135 ethnic groups. The list has faced criticism for overcounting the number of ethnic groups and classifying groups that speak unrelated languages under the same "national race." Specifically, it represents clans and people with dialectical differences as distinct ethnic groups, sometimes even repeating the same group under a different name. According to Gamanii, a researcher who scrutinised the claim, only 59 out of the 135 recognised ethnic groups can be verified as existing entities.

The following language families are associated the ethnic groups:

- Sino-Tibetan
  - Lolo–Burmese
  - Nungish
  - Sal
  - Karenic
  - Kuki-Chin
  - Sinitic
- Austroasiatic
  - Monic
  - Palaungic
- Indo-European
  - Indo-Aryan
- Kra–Dai
  - Southwestern Tai
- Hmong–Mien
  - Mienic
  - Hmongic
- Austronesian
  - Malayo-Polynesian

Note: The list is very controversial. Many of the names and spelling variants are known only from this list.

=== Kachin ===
According to the Burmese government, the Kachin comprises 12 different sub-groups:

№	Group	Native language	Language family	Language sub-family
1	Kachin	Various Kachin languages	Sino-Tibetan – Tibeto-Burman	Various
2	Tarone (Derung, Drung)	Derung	Sino-Tibetan – Tibeto-Burman	Nungish
4	Jinghpaw (Jingpo)	Jinghpaw	Sino-Tibetan – Tibeto-Burman	Sal
3	Dalaung	Jinghpaw (Dalaung dialect)	Sino-Tibetan – Tibeto-Burman	Sal
5	Guari, see Jingpo people	Jinghpaw (Guari dialect)	Sino-Tibetan – Tibeto-Burman	Sal
6	Hkahku, see Jingpo people	Jinghpaw (Hkahku dialect)	Sino-Tibetan – Tibeto-Burman	Sal
7	Duleng		Sino-Tibetan – Tibeto-Burman	
8	Maru (Lhao Vo, Langsu)	Maru	Sino-Tibetan – Tibeto-Burman	Lolo–Burmese
9	Rawang (Nung)	Rawang	Sino-Tibetan – Tibeto-Burman	Nungish
10	Lashi (La Chit)	Lashi	Sino-Tibetan – Tibeto-Burman	Lolo–Burmese
11	Zaiwa (Atsi)	Zaiwa (Atsi)	Sino-Tibetan – Tibeto-Burman	Lolo–Burmese
12	Lisu (Yawyin)	Lisu	Sino-Tibetan – Tibeto-Burman	Lolo–Burmese

=== Kayah ===
According to the Burmese government, the Kayah comprise nine sub-groups: (Note: The source of this list is the nine captions from an unscientific Italian book, using Italian spelling.)

№	Group	Native language	Language family	Language sub-family
1	Kayah (Karenni)	Karenni	Sino-Tibetan – Tibeto-Burman	Karenic
2	Zayein (Lahta; Gaungto; Loilong Karens)	Lahta	Sino-Tibetan – Tibeto-Burman	Karenic
3	Ka-Yun (Kayan; Padaung)	Kayan	Sino-Tibetan – Tibeto-Burman	Karenic
4	Gheko (Karen, Geko)	Geko	Sino-Tibetan – Tibeto-Burman	Karenic
5	Kebar (Geba)	Geba	Sino-Tibetan – Tibeto-Burman	Karenic
6	Bre (Ka-Yaw; Kayaw)	Kayaw	Sino-Tibetan – Tibeto-Burman	Karenic
7	Manu Manaw (Manumanaw)	Manumanaw	Sino-Tibetan – Tibeto-Burman	Karenic
8	Yin Talai (Yintale)	Yintale	Sino-Tibetan – Tibeto-Burman	Karenic
9	Yin Baw (Yinbaw)	Yinbaw	Sino-Tibetan – Tibeto-Burman	Karenic

=== Kayin ===
According to the Burmese government, the Kayin comprise 11 sub-groups:

№	Group	Native language	Language family	Language sub-family
1	Kayin (Karen)	Various Karen languages	Sino-Tibetan – Tibeto-Burman	Karenic
2	Kayinphyu (Geba Karen)	Geba	Sino-Tibetan – Tibeto-Burman	Karenic
3	Pa-le-chi (Paleki, possibly Mobwa)	Mobwa (tentative)	Sino-Tibetan – Tibeto-Burman	Karenic
4	Mon Kayin (Saphyu) (same as Pwo Karen)	Various Pwo Karen languages	Sino-Tibetan – Tibeto-Burman	Karenic
5	Sgaw (S’gaw Karen)	S'gaw Karen	Sino-Tibetan – Tibeto-Burman	Karenic
6	Ta-lay-pwa (Thalebwa)	Thalebwa (tentative)	Sino-Tibetan – Tibeto-Burman	Karenic
7	Paku (Paku Karen)	Paku	Sino-Tibetan – Tibeto-Burman	Karenic
8	Bwe (Bwe Karen)	Bwe	Sino-Tibetan – Tibeto-Burman	Karenic
9	Monnepwa (Paku Karen)	Possibly Paku (variant)	Sino-Tibetan – Tibeto-Burman	Karenic
10	Monpwa	Unknown	Sino-Tibetan – Tibeto-Burman	Karenic
11	Pwo Karen (Pwo Kayin, Pwo Karen)	Various Pwo Karen languages	Sino-Tibetan – Tibeto-Burman	Karenic

=== Chin ===
According to the Burmese government, the Chin comprise 53 sub-groups. This list was possibly originally a list of colonial tax rate districts. The groupings have long been contested by ethnic Chin leaders, and some subgroups like the Zomi refute their categorization as Chins. Ahead of the 2014 Myanmar census, the Chin National Action Committee on Census produced a list of mistakes and incoherencies with the government's list:

- Overarching category ambiguity: "Chin" is treated as just another coded category, rather than a distinct ethnolinguistic umbrella.
- Misclassification under "Chin": Some ethnic groups (e.g. Naga, Thanghkul, Meithei) do not self-identify as Chin.
- Non-ethnonyms listed: Some names (e.g. Saline, Mi-er) are not actual ethnonyms.
- Inconsistent spelling: Many group names are spelled inconsistently across languages (e.g. Khami/Khumi, Tiddim/Tedim).
- Merged identities: Some single names represent multiple distinct groups (e.g. Dai (Yinthu) representing both Dai and Daa Yinthu).
- Redundant listings: Some groups appear multiple times under different spellings (e.g. Lushai and Lushei for Lashai).
- Missing groups: Several well-defined groups are entirely omitted from the list (e.g. Ng’gha, Hlawn Ceu, Sometu, Larktu, Laisaw, Letu, Laitu, Mayin, Lungpaw, Minkya, Bawm).

The presence of 53 Chin sub-groups prompted confusion among census participants. Chin civil society groups called for a future revision to the number of Chin subgroups. In 2019, the national government confirmed it had no plans to correct the nomenclature.

№	Group	Native language	Language family	Language sub-family
1	Chin	Various Kuki-Chin languages	Sino-Tibetan – Tibeto-Burman	Kuki-Chin
2	Meithei (Meitei; Kathe)	Meitei (Manipuri)	Sino-Tibetan – Tibeto-Burman	Kuki-Chin
3	Salai	Unknown	Unknown	
4	Ka-lin-kaw (Mizo, Lushay, Kalinko)	Mizo	Sino-Tibetan – Tibeto-Burman	Kuki-Chin
5	Khami (Khumi)	Khumi	Sino-Tibetan – Tibeto-Burman	Kuki-Chin
6	Awa Khami (Mro-Khimi)	Mro-Khimi	Sino-Tibetan – Tibeto-Burman	Kuki-Chin
7	Khawno (Khuano)	Possibly a Chin dialect	Sino-Tibetan – Tibeto-Burman	
8	Khaungso (Hkongso)	Possibly a Chin dialect	Sino-Tibetan – Tibeto-Burman	
9	Kaung Saing Chin	Possibly a Chin dialect	Sino-Tibetan – Tibeto-Burman	
10	Kwelshin (Khualsim)	Dialect of Falam	Sino-Tibetan – Tibeto-Burman	Kuki-Chin
11	Kwangli (Sim)	Possibly a Chin dialect	Sino-Tibetan – Tibeto-Burman	
12	Gunte (Gangte, Lyente; Falam)	Gangte	Sino-Tibetan – Tibeto-Burman	Kuki-Chin
13	Gwete (Guite, Nguite)	Chin	Sino-Tibetan – Tibeto-Burman	Kuki-Chin
14	Ngorn (Chin, Ngawn)	Ngawn	Sino-Tibetan – Tibeto-Burman	Kuki-Chin
15	Sizang (Siyin)	Sizang (Siyin)	Sino-Tibetan – Tibeto-Burman	Kuki-Chin
16	Sentang	Possibly a Chin dialect	Sino-Tibetan – Tibeto-Burman	
17	Saing Zan	Possibly a Chin dialect	Sino-Tibetan – Tibeto-Burman	
18	Za-How (Zahau)	Zahau	Sino-Tibetan – Tibeto-Burman	Kuki-Chin
19	Zotung	Zotung	Sino-Tibetan – Tibeto-Burman	Kuki-Chin
20	Zo-Pe (Zophei, Zyphe)	Zyphe	Sino-Tibetan – Tibeto-Burman	Kuki-Chin
21	Zo (Zou)	Zou (Zo)	Sino-Tibetan – Tibeto-Burman	Kuki-Chin
22	Zahnyet (Zanniet)	Zanniat	Sino-Tibetan – Tibeto-Burman	Kuki-Chin
23	Tapong	Tapong	Sino-Tibetan – Tibeto-Burman	Kuki-Chin
24	Tiddim (Tedim, Haidim)	Tedim	Sino-Tibetan – Tibeto-Burman	Kuki-Chin
25	Tay-Zan	Possibly a Chin dialect	Sino-Tibetan – Tibeto-Burman	
26	Taishon (Tashon)	Taishon	Sino-Tibetan – Tibeto-Burman	Kuki-Chin
27	Thado	Thadou	Sino-Tibetan – Tibeto-Burman	Kuki-Chin
28	Torr people (Tawr)	Tawr	Sino-Tibetan – Tibeto-Burman	Kuki-Chin
29	Dim	Unknown	Sino-Tibetan – Tibeto-Burman	
30	Daa Yindu (Dai (Yindu))	Daa	Sino-Tibetan – Tibeto-Burman	Kuki-Chin
31	Naga	Various Naga languages	Sino-Tibetan – Tibeto-Burman	Kuki-Chin
32	Tangkhul	Tangkhul	Sino-Tibetan – Tibeto-Burman	
33	Malin	Possibly Chin or Mizo dialect	Sino-Tibetan – Tibeto-Burman	
34	Panun	Possibly Chin dialect	Sino-Tibetan – Tibeto-Burman	
35	Magun	Possibly Chin dialect	Sino-Tibetan – Tibeto-Burman	
36	Matu	Matu	Sino-Tibetan – Tibeto-Burman	Kuki-Chin
37	Miram (Mara)	Mara	Sino-Tibetan – Tibeto-Burman	Kuki-Chin
38	Mi-er	Possibly Chin dialect	Sino-Tibetan – Tibeto-Burman	
39	Mgan (Kaang)	Kaang	Sino-Tibetan – Tibeto-Burman	Kuki-Chin
40	Lushei (Lushay, Duhlian)	Mizo	Sino-Tibetan – Tibeto-Burman	Kuki-Chin
41	Laymyo	Laymyo	Sino-Tibetan – Tibeto-Burman	Kuki-Chin
42	Lyente	Possibly Falam-related dialect	Sino-Tibetan – Tibeto-Burman	Kuki-Chin
43	Lautu (Lutuv, Lawhtu)	Lautu	Sino-Tibetan – Tibeto-Burman	Kuki-Chin
44	Lai (Hakha Chin)	Lai (Hakha Chin)	Sino-Tibetan – Tibeto-Burman	Kuki-Chin
45	Laizao	Possibly Lai dialect	Sino-Tibetan – Tibeto-Burman	Kuki-Chin
46	Wakim (Mro)	Mro	Sino-Tibetan – Tibeto-Burman	Kuki-Chin
47	Hualngo	Hualngo	Sino-Tibetan – Tibeto-Burman	Kuki-Chin
48	Anu	Possibly Chin dialect	Sino-Tibetan – Tibeto-Burman	
49	Anun	Possibly Chin dialect	Sino-Tibetan – Tibeto-Burman	
50	Oo-Pu (Shö, Uppu)	Shö	Sino-Tibetan – Tibeto-Burman	Kuki-Chin
51	Lhinbu	Possibly Chin dialect	Sino-Tibetan – Tibeto-Burman	
52	Asho (Plain)	Asho	Sino-Tibetan – Tibeto-Burman	Kuki-Chin
53	Rongtu (Rungtu)	Rongtu	Sino-Tibetan – Tibeto-Burman	Kuki-Chin

=== Bamar ===
According to the Burmese government, the Bamar comprise nine sub-groups, several of which speak variants of Burmese. In 2016, the Thein Sein government officially recognised the Chinese-speaking Mong Wong in northern Shan State as the Mong Wong Bamar.

№	Group	Native language	Language family	Language sub-family
1	Burman (Bamar)	Burmese	Sino-Tibetan – Tibeto-Burman	Lolo-Burmese
2	Dawei (Tavoyan)	Burmese: Tavoyan dialect	Sino-Tibetan – Tibeto-Burman	Lolo-Burmese
3	Myeik (Beik, Merguese)	Burmese: Myeik dialect	Sino-Tibetan – Tibeto-Burman	Lolo-Burmese
4	Yaw	Burmese: Yaw dialect	Sino-Tibetan – Tibeto-Burman	Lolo-Burmese
5	Yabein (defunct)	Burmese: Yabein dialect	Sino-Tibetan – Tibeto-Burman	Lolo-Burmese
6	Kadu (Kado)	Kadu	Sino-Tibetan – Tibeto-Burman	Sal
7	Ganan	Ganan	Sino-Tibetan – Tibeto-Burman	Sal
8	Salone (Salon; Moken)	Moken	Austronesian	Malayo-Polynesian
9	Hpon people	Hpon	Sino-Tibetan – Tibeto-Burman	Lolo-Burmese

=== Mon ===
№	Group	Native language	Language family	Language sub-family
1	Mon	Mon	Austroasiatic	Monic

=== Rakhine ===
According to the Burmese government, the Rakhine comprise seven sub-groups. The groupings have been criciticised for including culturally different groups like the Mro and Thet under the Rakhine umbrella.

№	Group	Native language	Language family	Language sub-family
1	Rakhine (Arakanese)	Rakhine (Arakanese)	Sino-Tibetan – Tibeto-Burman	Lolo-Burmese
2	Kamein (Kaman)	Rakhine (Arakanese)	Sino-Tibetan – Tibeto-Burman	Lolo-Burmese
3	Kwe Myi (Khami)	Khumi	Sino-Tibetan – Tibeto-Burman	Kuki-Chin
4	Daingnet (Thetkama, Chakma)	Chakma	Indo-European	Indo-Aryan
5	Maramagyi (Barua)	Rakhine, Chittagonian	Indo-European	Indo-Aryan
6	Mro	Mro	Sino-Tibetan – Tibeto-Burman	Kuki-Chin
7	Thet (Chak)	Chak	Sino-Tibetan – Tibeto-Burman	Sal

=== Shan ===
According to the Burmese government, the Shan comprise 33 sub-groups. The groupings have been criciticised for including culturally different groups like the Kokang, Palaung, and Pa-O under the Shan umbrella. The list also includes redundant groups that go by different names, such as the Tai Leng, who are also called Shan Galay or Red Shan.

№	Group	Native language	Language family	Language sub-family
1	Shan (Tai)	Various Tai languages	Kra–Dai	Tai – Southwestern Tai
2	Yun (Tai Yuan, Lanna)	Northern Thai	Kra–Dai	Tai – Southwestern Tai
3	Kwi	Possibly a Tai dialect	Kra–Dai	
4	Pyin	Possibly a Tai dialect	Kra–Dai	
5	Yao (Mien)	Iu Mien	Hmong–Mien	Mienic
6	Danaw (Danau)	Danau	Austroasiatic	Palaungic
7	Pale (Ruching)	Palaung: Ruching dialect	Austroasiatic	Palaungic
8	Eng (En)	Possibly a Palaungic language	Austroasiatic	Palaungic
9	Son	Possibly a Palaungic language	Austroasiatic	Palaungic
10	Khamu (Khmu)	Khmu	Austroasiatic	Khmuic
11	Kaw (Akha)	Akha	Sino-Tibetan – Tibeto-Burman	Lolo–Burmese
12	Kokant (Kokang)	Mandarin	Sino-Tibetan – Tibeto-Burman	Sinitic
13	Khamti Shan (Hkamti)	Khamti	Kra–Dai	Tai – Southwestern Tai
14	Hkun (Tai Khün)	Khün	Kra–Dai	Tai – Southwestern Tai
15	Taungyo	Taungyo	Sino-Tibetan – Tibeto-Burman	Lolo–Burmese
16	Danu	Danu	Sino-Tibetan – Tibeto-Burman	Lolo–Burmese
17	Palaung (Ta'ang)	Palaung	Austroasiatic	Palaungic
18	Myaungzi (Hmong, Man Zi)	Hmong	Hmong–Mien	Hmongic
19	Yin Kya	Possibly a Palaungic language	Austroasiatic	Palaungic
20	Yin Net	Riang	Austroasiatic	Palaungic
21	Shan Gale (same as Tai-Leng)	Tai Leng	Kra–Dai	
22	Shan Gyi (Tai Long)	Tai Long	Kra–Dai	Tai – Southwestern Tai
23	Lahu	Lahu	Sino-Tibetan – Tibeto-Burman	Lolo–Burmese
24	Intha	Burmese: Intha dialect	Sino-Tibetan – Tibeto-Burman	Lolo–Burmese
25	Eikswair	Possibly a Tai dialect	Kra–Dai	
26	Pa-O (Taungthu; Black Karen)	Pa-O	Sino-Tibetan – Tibeto-Burman	Karenic
27	Tai-Loi	Tai Loi	Austroasiatic	Palaungic
28	Tai-Leng (Red Shan, Tai Laing)	Tai Leng	Kra–Dai	Tai – Southwestern Tai
29	Tai-Lon (Tai Long)	Tai Long	Kra–Dai	Tai – Southwestern Tai
30	Tai-Lay (Chinese Shan, Tai Nua)	Tai Nüa	Kra–Dai	Tai – Southwestern Tai
31	Maingtha (Achang)	Achang	Sino-Tibetan – Tibeto-Burman	Lolo–Burmese
32	Maw Shan (Tai Mao)	Tai Mao	Kra–Dai	Tai – Southwestern Tai
33	Wa (Va)	Wa	Austroasiatic	Palaungic

== Unrecognised ethnic groups ==
The government of Myanmar does not officially recognise several ethnic groups:

№	Group	Native language	Language family	Language sub-family
1	Anglo-Burmese	Burmese, English	Various, inc. Sino-Tibetan and Indo-European	Various
2	Burmese Chinese (Sino-Burmese)	Burmese, Chinese dialects (e.g. Hokkien, Cantonese)	Sino-Tibetan	Sinitic
3	Burmese Bengalis	Bengali, Chittagonian	Indo-European	Indo-Aryan
4	Panthay (Hui)	Mandarin Chinese	Sino-Tibetan	Sinitic
5	Burmese Indians, inc. Myanmar Tamils	Burmese, Hindi, Tamil, Urdu, etc.	Various, inc. Indo-European and Dravidian	Various
6	Taungtha people	Burmese, Rungtu	Sino-Tibetan	Lolo–Burmese
7	Rohingya people	Rohingya	Indo-European	Indo-Aryan
8	Burmese Gurkhas (Burmese Gorkhas, Nepalese)	Nepali	Indo-European	Indo-Aryan
9	Burmese Mizos	Mizo	Sino-Tibetan	Kuki-Chin
10	Burmese Jews	Hebrew, Burmese	Afro-Asiatic	Semitic
11	Bamar Muslims (Pathi)	Burmese, Urdu, Arabic (liturgical)	Indo-European	Lolo–Burmese, Indo-Aryan
12	Burmese Malays	Burmese, Malay	Austronesian	Malayo-Polynesian
13	Bayingyi	Burmese	Sino-Tibetan	Lolo–Burmese

== See also ==
- Neihsial

== Books ==
- U Min Naing (2000). National Ethnic Groups of Myanmar. Translated by Hpone Thant. Yangon: Thein Myint Win Press.
- National Races of Myanmar. Myanmar: Ministry of Culture. 1960.
