= Letu Chin =

Letu Hyju
- A Letu Chin Woman with A Tattoo Face

Total population
- 37,000 (2025)

Regions with significant populations
- Sjmlong(including Kyalong), Vaplong and Telong (including Phungtha) Minbya township, Rakhine state; Phunglong(both Paletwa, southern Chin state & Mrauk-U townships,Rakhine state

Languages
- Letu Language

Religion
- Buddhism, Christianity and Animism

Related ethnic groups
- Laitu, Hiatuii, Cumtu, Läoktü,Khyang,Shö, Daai, Daa Yindu, Uppu, Asho

The Letu Chin (Burmese: လေးတူချင်း) tribe is one of the Chin ethnic groups that inhabited western Myanmar, particularly Minbya and Mrauk-U townships in Rakhine State, and the Laymyo region in Paletwa township, southern Chin State. They are one of the ethnolinguistic communities within the larger Chin ethnic group, which belongs to the Tibeto-Burman branch of the Sino-Tibetan language family.

The first record of Letu as "Ledu" in English is found in The Tribes of Burma. The records of Letu Chin as "Ledu(1700)" on page 395 of the Burmese Encyclopedia, Volume 2 (Yangon: Sarpay Beikman, 1955), and "Ledu(1712)," in the Minbya Hill Tracts(1934) by Tha Tun Pru can respectively be found. The "Letu," a serial number (93) in the original list of (144) national races acknowledged by the Ministry of Home and Religious Affairs on 9 December 1972. This name resulted from mistranslations of colonial-era British records into Myanmar language. In the Indigenous Cultural Traditions (Chin) published in 1968 by the Burma Socialist Programme Party, it was explicitly and officially recorded as "လေးတူ" in Burmese. And in the English, Helga So-Hartmann, a linguist, in 1988 had correctly recorded as "Letu" to refer to this Chin ethnic in her work of "Notes on the Southern Chin languages." The Letu Chin live in and around the valleys of the Arakan (Rakhine) Yoma, which encompasses Rakhine State, southern Chin State, and the mountainous regions of western Myanmar.

During the British colonial period, the Letu Chin were recorded in official census reports of Burma. In the Census of India, 1921, Vol. XI, Burma (Part I: Report), they were listed under the ethnic classification code C.36 Ledu. In the Census of India, 1931, Vol. XI, Burma (Part I), they were listed under the classification code C.40 Ledu. These census records provide historical documentation of the Letu Chin population during the colonial era.

After gaining independence, and starting after 1983, the Letu (Chin) were put under the "Laymyo (Chin)" area code; however, the Letu Chin do not identify as Laymyo Chin. Letu Chin Among the (135) indigenous ethnic groups residing in the Republic of the Union of Myanmar, "Laymyo (Chin)" is listed at serial number (73) overall, and as serial number (40) among the (53) Chin groups. The code assigned to it by the state based on geographic area is (441). During population censuses, this serves as a collective code used for communities speaking Letu (Chin), Hiatui (Chin), Vet (Yet) Chin, Haang (Chin), and Uppu (Chin) living in the Laymyo region of Paletwa Township.

== Settlement ==
According to historical research regarding Chin ethnic groups in Rakhine State, Chin communities have settled in parts of the Rakhine region since the ancient times. The Rakhine Yazawin Thit (New Rakhine Chronicle) notes Chin ethnic communities inhabiting the Rakhine Yoma and adjacent valley areas around the 14th century AD.

In the Rakhine chronicles, names similar to "Letu", which some anthropological researchers consider to be connected to the Letu Chin, are found. Records indicate that ethnic groups known as "Laythù" or "Laythú" resided in the eastern mountainous regions of the Arakan kingdom during the Mrauk-U period.

Zo historian Vumson divided the migration and distribution of the Chin (Zo) people in Myanmar into two groups: Early Migrants and Late Migrants, who settled between the 10th and 13th centuries AD. The Late Migrants group includes the Southern Chin and Asho Chin, who migrated from the lower Chindwin River to the upper regions of Myanmar and then migrated again to the Arakan (Rakhine) Yoma and dispersed across the region. As members of the Hyow branch(which include Khyang, Shö, Letu, Laitu, Sumtu, Läoktü, Uppu and Hiatui), the Letu Chin tribe belongs to this group of later settlers.

== Shift-and-burn cultivation (hill rice farming) ==
Like most other Chin ethnic groups, the Letu Chin ethnic group also primarily practices shift-and-burn hill farming. Due to the lack of arable flat plains for lowland rice cultivation in the Rakhine Yoma mountain range or in the hill areas, the majority of these Chin ethnic groups rely on hill rice farming for their livelihood. However, some Letu living in lowland areas cultivate lowland paddy fields, as there are flat lowland areas. In addition, they also do gardening, agricultural and perennial crops.

== Society and culture ==
Traditionally, Letu society is structured around families, clan, a cluster (each composed of 6 clans), and village-based communities and kin-based relationships formed by combining them. Like most Chin ethnic groups, they have maintained strong social organization systems.

Elements of Letu culture include:

Organization through clusters comprising (6) clans

Clan-based social structure

Oral history and folklore passed down through generations

Infant naming ceremonies

Facial tattooing customs

Traditional songs and musical heritage

Weaving and textile traditions

Community ceremonies and festivals

Traditional customary laws

== Infant naming ceremony ==

Among the Letu Chin, when a baby boy is born, he is made to step on the earth together with a bow and arrow on the 3rd day. The father crafts exactly (6) arrows using karen/kharen bamboo, the melocanna baccifera and he shoots them at a tree or object until all the arrows are spent. After this, the parents descend from the house and have the child step on the ground. For this reason, they take pride in saying, "The Letu Chin are a people born with the bow." If the child is a baby girl, she is given a carrying basket (palai) and a weaving loom shuttle (yesthei) to hold before being made to step on the ground. This ritual is called Ó Kóm. This tradition is still practiced by some family members in certain regions to this day.

The primary purpose of performing this ritual is to ensure that a male child grows up to be a capable, honorable man who brings pride to his people, and that a female child grows up to be feminine, virtuous, and well-integrated into society. Like other Chin groups, the Letu Chin is a male-dominated society, defining lineage strictly through the male line and placing greater emphasis on male children.

During the shooting of these arrows (ranging from 3 to 6 shots), it is believed that if every shot hits the target, the child will excel exceptionally in all future endeavors throughout his life; if most hit the target, he would be great; and if only a few hit, he will achieve an average level of success. It is said the name, the Letu, was derived from this custom.

== Facial tattooing custom of the Letu Chin ==
The Letu Chin belong to the group of Chin sub-groups that practice facial tattooing. As part of the Southern Chin group, they refer to facial tattooing in their own language as Mháwi Sún Ne, which means "tattooed face." According to English records, girls were tattooed prior to marriage, typically between the ages of 12 and 15. In the mountain regions, it is recorded that girls received their tattoos between the ages of 12 and 13, while Tha Tun Pru in his work, the Minbya Hill Tracts(1934) records note the age range as 11 to 15. Facial tattooing continued to be practiced until 1995; however, this tradition is no longer active today. Documentation on Letu Chin facial tattoos can be found in modern research by Jens Parkitny in his book, Marked for Life: Myanmar’s Chin Women and their Facial Tattoos.

== Traditional costumes ==
The male tunic of the Letu Chin is called Khrangim, while the female tunic is known as Khranghën. In ancient times, these garments were worn exclusively during special traditional spirit ceremonies. They are hand-woven using traditional cotton threads and decorated with sea shells, porcelain buttons, and numerous red beads. Their colors predominantly feature deep red, alongside elements of black.

== Language group and subgroup classification ==
The Letu Chin belong to the Chin ethnolinguistic family and are generally classified as part of the Southern Chin sub-group. Linguistically, the Letu Chin language is connected to the Kuki-Chin branch under the Sino-Tibetan language family.

In numerous research studies, the Letu Chin are grouped alongside the Laitu, Sumtu, Läoktü, and Uppu, Daai, Daa Yindu,Shö,and Asho Chin sub-groups as part of the Hyow group, situated between the Cho and Asho Chin. Although these sub-groups maintain their own distinct ethnic identities, they share significant linguistic, cultural, and historical connections. Consequently, in linguistic and anthropological studies, they are frequently discussed as sub-groups belonging to the Cho–Hyow–Asho group or the Southeastern Chin group.

Letu (Chin) Orthography / Alphabet (English-based Script)
A,a	AW,aw	B,b	C,c	D,d
E,e	Ë,ë	H,h	I,i	J,j
K,k	L,l	M,m	N,n	O,o
P,p	Q,q	S,s	T,t	U,u
V,v	X,x	Y,y	Z,z	

Letu (Chin) Orthography / Alphabet (Burmese-based Script)
K,k	KH,kh	NG,ng	C,c	S,s
NY,ny	T,t	TH,th	D,d	N,n
P,p	PH,ph	B,b	M,m	Y,y
	L,l	V,v	H,h	

11 Vowels
A,a	AW,aw	E,e	EI,ei	Ë,ë	I,i
O,o	U,u	X,x	J,j	Ä,ä	

16 Diphthongs
AI,ai	AWI,awi	AU,au	AWU,awu	Eu, eu
ËU,ëu	IU,iu	OI,oi	UAW,uaw	UI,ui
UJ,uj	XI,xi	XU,xu	JI,ji	JU,ju
		Ä,ä		

6 Ending Consonants in the Letu Language
6 Ending Consonants	Example	Meaning
K	Kawk	Basket(especially bamboo-product)
M	Am	Pot
N	Con	Run
Ng	Pang	Shout
P	Pap	Broken of bamboo or pipe
T	Tap	fix or install
