= Southern Kuki-Chin languages =

Branch of Kuki-Chin languages

Southern Kuki-Chin
- Southern Chin
- Geographic distribution: Myanmar, Bangladesh, India
- Ethnicity: Chin
- Linguistic classification: Sino-Tibetan: Tibeto-Burman; Central Tibeto-Burman (?); Kuki-Chin–Naga; Kuki-Chin; Southern Kuki-Chin

Language codes
- Glottolog: sout3160 (South Peripheral Kuki-Chin)

Southern Kuki-Chin is a branch of Kuki-Chin languages. They are spoken mostly in southern Chin State, Myanmar and in southeastern Bangladesh.

Some languages formerly classified as Southern Kuki-Chin, including Khumi, Mro, Rengmitca, are now classified as Khomic languages by Peterson (2017).

VanBik (2009) and Peterson (2017) split Southern Kuki-Chin into the Asho and Cho branches.

== Languages ==
Asho

- Shö (Asho)
- Laitu
- Ekai (Läoktü)
- Sumtu

Cho

- Daai
- Kaang
- Matu
- Müün (K'cho, Ng'meeng, Nitu, Hmong-k'cha, Ng'gah)
- Uppu (Chinbon)

Also:

- Thaiphum
- Welaung (Rawngtu)
- Rungtu (Taungtha)
- Songlai
