= Mindat =

Mindat may refer to:

== Places ==
- Mindat District, a district in Chin State, Myanmar (Burma), consisting of two townships and many villages
  - Mindat Township, Myanmar
    - Mindat, Chin State, a town in Chin State, Myanmar, administrative seat of Mindat Township

== Other uses ==
- Mindat, alternative name for the Kʼchò language in Myanmar
- Mindat Min, a Burmese prince
- Mindat.org, an online mineralogy database
