= Taungtha =

Taungtha may refer to:

- Taungtha people
- Rungtu, or Taungtha language
- Taungtha, Magway
- Taungtha, Mandalay, seat of Taungtha Township
- Taungtha Township, Mandalay Region
