= Laymyo language =

Kuki-Chin language of Myanmar

Laymyo
- Region: Myanmar
- Ethnicity: Laymyo Chin
- Native speakers: 15000 (2014)
- Language family: Sino-Tibetan: Tibeto-Burman; Laymyo

Language codes
- ISO 639-3: –
- Glottolog: lemy1239

Laymyo language (Burmese: လေးမြို့; also spelt Lemyo or Phung lawng) is a Tibeto-Burman language spoken mainly in Myanmar's Southern Chin State across the Lemro River, where it is the main dialect. It is the mother tongue of the Yet people and some members of the Dai ethnic group, including the Khawng people, Hang and Yet. The Laymyo language is a branch of Kuki-Chin within the Tibeto-Burman language family. Laymyo people mainly reside in Paletwa Township. The Laymyo language exhibits distinct features while sharing certain similarities with neighboring languages.

== Relation to other languages ==
Laymyo dialects are closely related to the languages spoken by members of the Dai ethnic group who reside in Kanpanlet, Matupi, and Mindat. However, the language in Laymyo displays slow accents and a faster pace. The distinctions are most pronounced in the realm of literary writing. Laymyo exhibits lexical similarity with the Dai language, estimated at 90%. It shares around 60% of its lexicon with the Asho language and roughly 20% with the Laitu language.

== Evolution ==
When the Christian missionaries arrived in the Laymyo area, reforms and open views emerged. A mission from the Mara Evangelical Church arrived, and in 1975, local people and missionary Rev. Thla Chhau worked together to develop an alphabet. Initially, it closely resembled the Mara alphabet, but with later editions, this changed. Now, It is used in church worship song books, prayers and letters, and is used by more than five churches.

== Tone ==
Although the Dai people and the members of the Laymyo people can communicate and understand each other comfortably, the Laymyo language is less fluctuating, and they speak faster. Sometimes, the accent varies from one village to another. They speak slowly and steadily along Bu Sen Village in the Lemro area, while the residents of Pai Sein Village in the Tan Chaung River area speak like the upper Dai people.

== Written system ==
The Laymyo alphabet is based on the Roman script and consists of 25 letters, including 10 auxiliaries that comprise more than one letter, but produce only one sound. Occasionally, the letter "J" is also used.

Below are the 25 letters:

A	AW	Y	YA	B	C
D	E	F	NG	H	I
K	L	M	N	O	P
R	S	T	U	V	W
		Z			

Among these letters are the vowel characters A E I O U AW YA Y NG. The remaining characters are consonants.

Auxiliary letters:

CH	PH	TH	HL	KH	SH	HM	HN	HNG	THL

The sound is determined by the letters at the front of the word.

- M (pronounced with a muffled sound)
- Ng (pronounced with a nasal sound)
- K (pronounced with a guttural sound)

The three-letter words included in front of the word are not necessary when speaking aloud, but when using that letter, the sound must be observed.

== Conversations ==
Khuihpawi sen byaih: Hello, Hi.

Na sak ei ki mai?: How are you?

Hngam na seh ze ki nu?: Where are you going?

Buh na ei pyan ngaw?: Have you eaten?

Ka nang mkyi: Thank you.

Sak ei byaih: Take care or be careful.

Nang ta u nu?: Who are you?

Ih na cai ki nu?: What are you doing?

Ym lai: So sorry.

Nang mlung ka kse byaih: Don't be sorry.

Ka ry nak: I am happy.
