= Taungtha people =

Unrecognized ethnic group in Myanmar

တောင်သား

Total population
- 30,000 – 35,000

Regions with significant populations
- Magway Region, Myanmar

Languages
- Rungtu, Burmese language

Religion
- Theravada Buddhism, animism

Related ethnic groups
- Bamar

The Taungtha people (Burmese: တောင်သား လူမျိုး) or Rungtu (Burmese: ရောင်တူ) are an unrecognized ethnic group primarily found in Magway Region, a central region in Myanmar (Burma). The Taungtha are not officially recognized by the Burmese state as one of the country's 135 ethnic groups. The Taungtha population is approximately 30,000 to 35,000 strong.

== Location ==
The Taungtha primarily live in villages scattered throughout the Chin Hills of Gangaw District, which is flanked to the west by Chin State, the westernmost part of Myanmar (formerly Burma) as well as in Mindat Township of Chin State. There are 23 Taungtha villages in Htilin Township, 3 in Gangaw Township, and 22 in Saw Township.

== History ==
The origins of the Taungtha people are unclear. The Taungtha claim descent from the Pyu people, who had established a number of city-states in modern-day Myanmar. The Taungtha believe that during the rise of Pagan Kingdom in subsequent centuries, the purported ancestors of the Taungtha fled north from their original home near Mount Popa to their present-day location, earning the moniker "Taungtha" (lit. "sons from the south" or "sons from the hills"). Some Taungtha date their migration to the reign of Thamoddarit, a legendary king of Pagan. The historical origins may be that the Taungtha are in fact Burmanized Chins; their native language, Rungtu, belongs to the family of Southern Kuki-Chin languages, and like other Chin-speaking groups living outside of Chin State, they do not self-identify as Chin.

=== Official recognition ===
The Taungtha formerly self-identified as "Taungtha" on identity documents, until stricter enforcement of the recognized ethnic groups in recent times required them to begin self-identifying as Bamar. On 17 January 2018, Kyaw Myint, a regional lawmaker at the Magway Region Hluttaw convened a proposal to submit a formal request to the national-level Assembly of the Union in order to gain official recognition of the Taungtha people as an indigenous ethnic group, but the measure failed. The basis for the proposal, according to Kyaw Myint, who is of Taungtha descent, was to preserve the cultural heritage, literature, and language of the Taungtha people. Opposing lawmakers voiced concern about the need to fund and conduct additional research to further examine the history and origins of minority groups such as the Taungtha as a precursor to further action.

== Language ==
The Taungtha speak the Burmese language in addition to Taungtha, which is considered a part of the Southern Kuki-Chin language family. During the British colonial era, scholars observed that Taungtha and Mün were akin to the neighboring Shö language (Asho Chin). Taungtha is an unwritten language, and the spoken language is endangered, as the primary medium of education is in Burmese. There is regional variation in the Taungtha language, specifically between the dialects spoken in the north (Htilin Township) versus the south (Saw Township).

== Culture ==
While Taungtha men are indistinguishable from their Burman counterparts (traditionally donning taungshay longyi), Taungtha women traditionally wear a costume called taung thamawut (တောင်သမဝတ်), consisting of a red shawl worn as a body wrap, over a long white robe or gown. Historically, the color of the shawls reflected a female's relative age and marital status: girls wore white shawls, single young women wore red shawls, while married women wore darker-colored shawls.

The majority of Taungtha are farmers who cultivate rice paddy, beans and pulses, lemons, oranges, onions, and peppers. As of 2018, community-based tourism initiatives are also being established in Taungtha villages.

Traditional meals consist of an assortment of dishes eaten on a daunglan. Hospitality and generosity are important facets of Taungtha culture. Traditional houses are built of wood, and without nails, with structures fastened together using wooden hinges.

== Religion ==
The Taungtha have syncretic beliefs, practicing Theravada Buddhism while worshipping traditional nats (spirits).

== See also ==
- Welaung language
- Pyu city-states
- Pyu language
