= Natmataung National Park =

National park in Myanmar

- Burmese: နတ်မတောင်အမျိုးသားဥယျာဉ်
- IUCN category II (national park)
- Location within Myanmar
- Location: Chin State, Myanmar
- Coordinates: 21°25′N 93°47′E
- Area: 279.3 mi^{2} (723 km^{2})
- Established: 2010
- Governing body: Nature and Wildlife Conservation Division

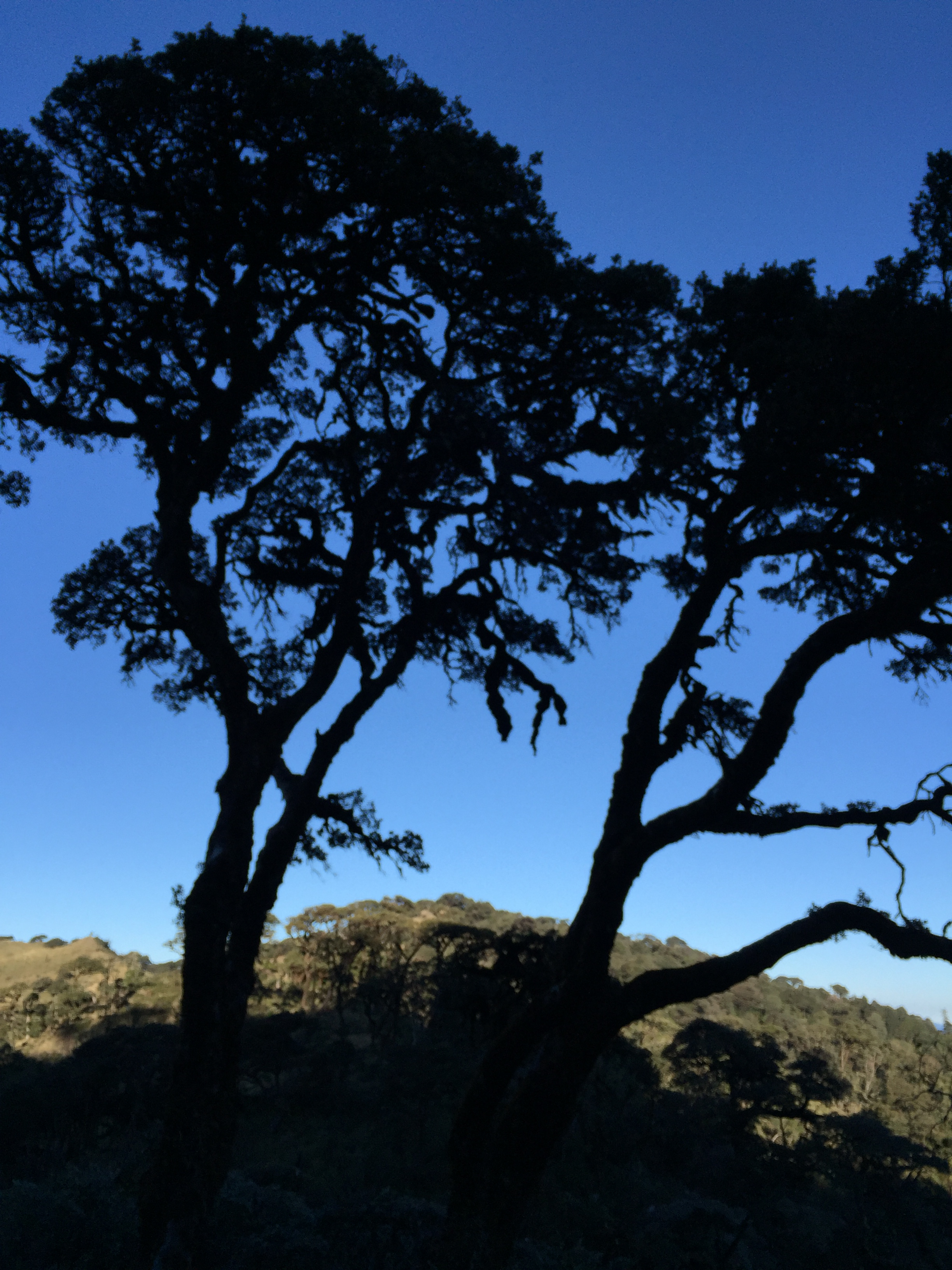
Natmataung, Mount Victoria

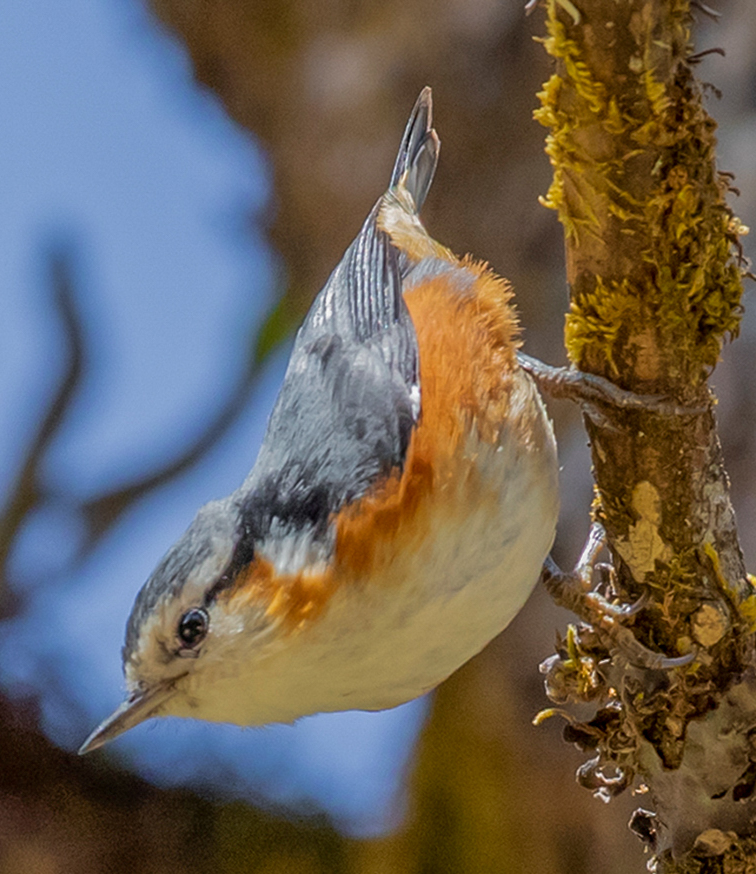
White-browed Nuthatch - Sitta victoriae

Natmataung National Park is a national park in Myanmar covering 723 km^{2} (279.3 mi^{2}). It was established in 2010 and is listed as one of the ASEAN Heritage Parks. In elevation, it ranges from 740 to 3,070 m (2,430 to 10,070 ft), surrounding Nat Ma Taung (Mount Victoria) in Mindat and Kanpetlet Township, Chin State. It was designated an Important Bird Area in 2004, and BirdLife International and Makino Botanical Garden conduct studies here in collaboration with the National Park Service.

== History ==
The area was first protected in 1994 for watershed conservation purposes. In 2010, it was formally designated as a national park by the Myanmar government. In 2012, it was declared an ASEAN Heritage Park, recognizing its regional ecological importance.

== Geography and landscape ==
Natmataung National Park covers approximately 72,300 hectares (723 km^{2}) across the Chin Hills of western Myanmar, spanning the townships of Kanpetlet, Mindat, and Matupi. The park's terrain features steep mountain slopes, deep valleys, and high ridges. Elevations range from 740 metres (2,430 ft) to 3,070 metres (10,070 ft) at the summit of Mount Victoria, the highest peak in Chin State.

Due to its variation in elevation, the park hosts multiple habitat types, including lowland dipterocarp, mixed deciduous, pine, oak-rhododendron, and montane evergreen forests. It serves as an important watershed, feeding tributaries of the Myittha and Lemro Rivers, which connect to the Irrawaddy River.

== Biodiversity ==
Natmataung National Park is one of Myanmar's most significant biodiversity zones, with surveys documenting over 808 plant species, including ferns, orchids, and rhododendrons. Fauna includes approximately 299 bird species, 23 amphibians, 65 reptiles, and 77 butterfly species. The white-browed nuthatch (Sitta victoriae), endemic to the region, is the park's flagship species. Mammals such as the Western hoolock gibbon, clouded leopard and gaur also inhabit the park.

== Local culture and significance ==
The park lies within the ancestral lands of Chin ethnic groups such as the D’ai, M’uun, and Upu tribes.

Nat Ma Taung (locally known as Khaw-nu-soum or Khonuamthung) means "Mother of Spirits" or "Great Mountain Goddess". It is revered in traditional animist beliefs, symbolizing guardian spirits dwelling on the peak.

The region is also known for the facial tattoos of Chin women, a cultural identity practice once considered a mark of beauty but now fading among younger generations.

== Conservation ==
The park is managed by the Nature and Wildlife Conservation Division of Myanmar's Ministry of Environmental Conservation and Forestry. Despite its protected status, it faces several conservation challenges:

- Shifting cultivation (taungya), which leads to deforestation and habitat fragmentation
- Illegal hunting, threatening species such as bears and serow
- Resource extraction for firewood and building materials
- Road development increasing habitat disturbance and access for poachers

Its designation as an ASEAN Heritage Park aims to promote regional cooperation for conservation. Current efforts, often supported by international organizations, focus on sustainable livelihoods and community-based forest management.
