= Kaang language =

Sino-Tibetan language spoken in Myanmar

Kaang
- Region: Myanmar
- Native speakers: 35,000 (2020)
- Language family: Sino-Tibetan: Tibeto-Burman; Central Tibeto-Burman (?); Kuki-Chin–Naga; Kuki-Chin; Southern; Kaang

Language codes
- ISO 639-3: ckn
- Glottolog: kaan1248

Kaang (Kaang Chin; also rendered Kang, M’kaang, Mgan) is a Kuki-Chin language spoken by about 35,000 people in Mindat Township and Matupi Township, Chin State, Myanmar. There are three sub-groups under Kaang, namely Zo Kaang, Puei Kaang, and Cum Kaang. Kaang has 73% to 80% lexical similarity with Welaung, 77% to 79% similarity with Müün Chin, and 67% to 80% with Daai Chin.
