= Thaiphum language =

Southern Kuki-Chin language of Burma

Thaiphum
- Region: Burma
- Native speakers: 1,000 (2005)
- Language family: Sino-Tibetan: Tibeto-Burman; Kuki-Chin; Southern; Thaiphum

Language codes
- ISO 639-3: cth
- Glottolog: None

Thaiphum (Thaiphum Chin) is a Southern Kuki-Chin language spoken in 4 villages of Matupi township, Chin State, Burma. Thaiphum is partially intelligible with neighboring languages, such as the Eastern Khumi varieties of Khenlak, Asang, and Rengcaa. Thaiphum has 72%–75% lexical similarity with Eastern Khumi, 69%–71% with Khumi, 65%–68% with Mro-Khimi, and 66%–71% with Matu Chin.
