= Mangsan, Myanmar =

Village in Chin State, Myanmar

Mangsan
- Location in Burma
- Coordinates: 21°33′N 92°47′E
- Country: Myanmar
- Division: Chin State
- District: Mindat
- Township: Paletwa
- Elevation: 300 ft (90 m)
- Time zone: UTC+6.30 (MST)

Mangsan is a village in Paletwa Township, Mindat District, in the Chin State of Myanmar, about four kilometers north-west from the town of Kawang.
