= Rengmitca language =

Kuki-Chin language of Bangladesh

Rengmitca
- Native to: Bangladesh
- Region: Chittagong Hill Tracts
- Native speakers: <20 (2020)
- Language family: Sino-Tibetan: Tibeto-Burman; Central Tibeto-Burman (?); Kuki-Chin-Naga; Kuki-Chin; Khomic; Rengmitca

Language codes
- ISO 639-3: None (mis)
- Glottolog: reng1255

Rengmitca is a critically endangered Kuki-Chin language of Bangladesh. It is distinct but closely related to the nearby languages Khumi and Mro. There are fewer than 30 speakers left as of 2014. Only 5 are completely fluent, all over the age of 60. But as of 2021 there are only 6 speakers of this language left, most of whom are over the age of 60. It lacks a written script.

Rengmitca is spoken to the northeast of Alikadam town in the southern Chittagong Hill Tracts of Bangladesh.

Peterson (2017) classifies Rengmitca as a Khomic language. In addition to the published work of David A. Peterson, an ongoing doctoral project entitled The Documentation of Rengmitca: A Critically Endangered Language in Bangladesh is being undertaken by Afsana Ferdous under the supervision of Nathan W. Hill at Trinity College Dublin. The project is archived in the Endangered Languages Archive (ELAR).

== Sources ==
- Peterson, David A. 2013. "Rengmitca: The most endangered Kuki-Chin language of Bangladesh." In Nathan W. Hill and Thomas Owen-Smith, eds. Trans-Himalayan linguistics: Historical and descriptive linguistics of the Himalayan area, 313–327. Berlin: Mouton de Gruyter.
- Peterson, David A. 2014. The dynamics of Rengmitca's endangerment. Paper presented at SoLE-3, Yunnan Nationalities University.
