= Matu people =

Ethnic group in Myanmar and India

Matu
Total population
- 34,000

Regions with significant populations
- Matupi Township; Mizoram

Languages
- Matu

Religion
- Christianity; traditional religion

Related ethnic groups
- Mara, Daai, and other Chin peoples

The Matu, also known as the Matu Chin or Nga La, are a Chin ethnic group primarily residing in Matupi Township of Chin State, Myanmar (Burma); they are one of the 135 officially recognized ethnic groups of Myanmar. Around 10,000 Matu people live in Mizoram, India, where they are classified as part of the Mizo people.

== History ==
In 1944, two pastors, That Dun and Pa Hrek, began missionary work among the Matu people, introducing them to Christianity. The New Testament was translated into the Matu language in 1992.

== Culture ==
Matu women wear dresses adorned by numerous necklaces and waist chains.

== Bibliography ==
- Illinois Studies in Anthropology. University of Illinois Press. 1963.
- Bradley, David (2002). Medieval Tibeto-Burman Languages. Vol. 6. ISBN 978-90-47-40130-8.
- Seekins, Donald M. (2025). The Army-State and Spatial Politics in Burma. Bristol University Press. ISBN 9781529240467.
- A History of Churches in Myanmar. Association for Theological Education in Myanmar. 2022.
