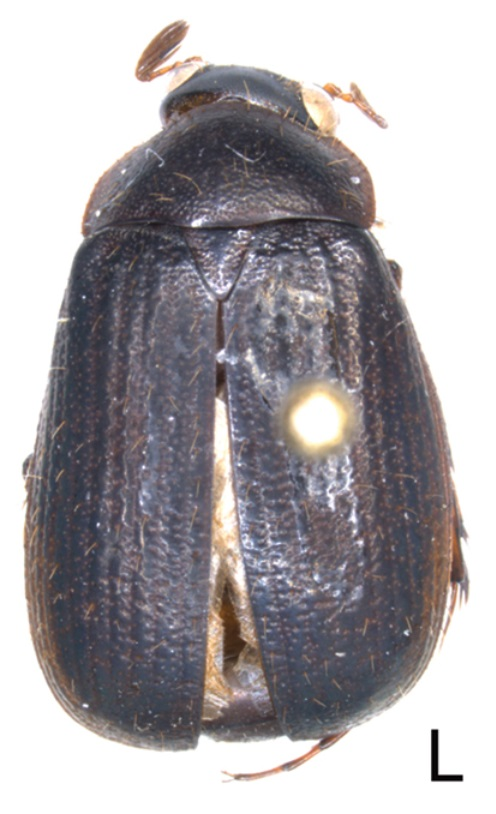

Scientific classification
- Kingdom: Animalia
- Phylum: Arthropoda
- Class: Insecta
- Order: Coleoptera
- Suborder: Polyphaga
- Infraorder: Scarabaeiformia
- Family: Scarabaeidae
- Genus: Neoserica
- Species: N. natmatoungensis

Binomial name
- Neoserica natmatoungensis Ahrens, Liu, Fabrizi, Bai & Yang, 2014

= Neoserica natmatoungensis =

Species of beetle

Neoserica natmatoungensis is a species of beetle of the family Scarabaeidae. It is found in Myanmar.

== Description ==
Adults reach a length of about 9.5–11 mm. They have a dark brown, oblong body. The ventral surface and antennae are yellowish brown, the anterior labroclypeus shiny and the dorsal surface moderately shiny. The frons is dull, with numerous long, yellow, semi-erect setae.

== Etymology ==
The species is named after its type locality, the Natmataung National Park.
