= Phalaenopsis natmataungensis =

Scientific classification
- Kingdom: Plantae
- Clade: Tracheophytes
- Clade: Angiosperms
- Clade: Monocots
- Order: Asparagales
- Family: Orchidaceae
- Subfamily: Epidendroideae
- Genus: Phalaenopsis
- Species: P. natmataungensis

Binomial name
- Phalaenopsis natmataungensis (T.Yukawa, Nob.Tanaka & J.Murata) Dalström & Ormerod
- distribution of Phalaenopsis natmataungensis

Synonyms
- Doritis natmataungensis T.Yukawa, Nob.Tanaka & J.Murata

Species of epiphytic orchid

Phalaenopsis natmataungensis is a species of orchid endemic to Myanmar. The specific epithet natmataungensis refers to Nat Ma Taung, Myanmar. The mountain slopes are covered in natural, seasonally dry forests that are mainly composed of deciduous trees. These areas are generally not disturbed by agriculture.

== Description ==
It is an epiphytic herb with elongate, fleshy, compressed, photosynthetic, greenish gray roots andfleshy, deciduous, elliptic-obovate, deep green, 5.4–6.8 cm long and 2–2.6 cm wide leaves. The leaves are absent at anthesis, but are present during the growing season. The stem is enclosed in persistent leaf sheaths. The suberect to pendent, axillary inflorescences bear 4–16 dull green mottled, fragrant flowers with additional purple colouration. The labellum is creamy yellow. The lateral lobes of the labellum are mottled with purplish brown colouration. Flowering occurs from April to May.

== Ecology ==
This species is found in disturbed forest along streams at altitudes of 1740 m above sea level.

== Taxonomy ==
This species is closely related to Phalaenopsis stobartiana, from which it differs through mottled petals and sepals, as well as morphological details of the labellum.

== Conservation ==
The IUCN conservation status of Phalaenopsis natmataungensis has been reported to be endangered (EN), however as of March 2022 this status is not confirmed in the IUCN Red List of Threatened Species.
