= Hpon people =

Ethnic group in Myanmar

ဖွန်း

Total population
- 1,600 (2025)

Regions with significant populations
- Kachin State: Bhamo District; Myitkyina District

Languages
- Hpon, Burmese

Religion
- Buddhism; folk religion; Christianity

The Hpon people (Burmese: ဖွန်းလူမျိုး; also spelt Hpun) are an ethnic group in Kachin State, Myanmar. They are one of Myanmar's 135 recognized ethnic groups and speak the Hpon language.

== Culture and religion ==
The Ayeyarwady River has long been the lifeline of Hpon society, with many making their living in the fishing industry. The Hpon primarily practice Buddhism, with minorities practicing folk religion and Christianity.
