= Nga La language =

Sino-Tibetan language spoken in Myanmar and India

Matu
- Matu Chin
- Region: Myanmar, India
- Ethnicity: Matu
- Native speakers: 30,000 (2012)
- Language family: Sino-Tibetan: Tibeto-Burman; Central Tibeto Burman (?); Kuki-Chin-Naga; Kuki-Chin; Southern; Matu
- Writing system: Latin

Language codes
- ISO 639-3: hlt – inclusive code Individual code: weu – Rawngtu Chin
- Glottolog: ngal1291

Matu, also known as Matu Chin, is a Kuki-Chin language spoken in Matupi township, Chin State, Myanmar, and also in Mizoram, India by the Matu people. Matu is the most commonly spoken language in Matupi Township outside of Burmese language, which is the official language of Myanmar. A written script for Matu was created in 1954 by Rev. Johnson and Rev. Ngai Tim.

The Matu dialects share 78%–89% lexical similarity. Matu shares 66%–71% lexical similarity with Thaiphum Chin.

Rawngtu Chin is spoken in Mindat township, Chin State, as well as in 2 villages of Htilin township, Magway Region. The Rawngtu dialects, which include Kyonnam, Welaung, Boishi, and Shitwanu, share 90% lexical similarity. The Kyonnam variety is adequately comprehended by most Rawngtu, but not by the Matu, who do not self-identify as Rawngtu. Rawngtu shares 84%–89% lexical similarity with Matupi Daai, 67%–74% with Kaang Chin, 71%–83% with Matu dialects, and less than 70% with Rungtu.

== Dialects ==
Ethnologue lists the following dialects of Matupi, Chin State. Matu from Mizoram, India is reportedly not intelligible with various tribal ethnicities of Matupi in Myanmar.

- Matu - Language of native citizens/settlers of Matupi(formerly known as Batupuei)
- Ciing - (Langle (Tlamtlaih), Ngalaeng, Phanaeng, Voitu)
- Doem (Valang) (cangtak)
- Nguitu (Leiring)
- Hlangpang (Changpyang-Ramtuem)
- Haltu
- Ta'aw (Daihnan, Luivang)
- Tuivang (Amsoi-Rawkthang)
- Matu Dai (Madu-Weilu)
- Weilaung (Kronam-Leishi)
- Thaiphum

== Bibliography ==
- Shintani Tadahiko. 2016. The Matu language. Linguistic survey of Tay cultural area (LSTCA) no. 110. Tokyo: Research Institute for Languages and Cultures of Asia and Africa (ILCAA).
