= Kanpetlet =

Town in Chin State, Myanmar

Kanpetlet ကန်ပက်လက်မြို့
- Location in Burma
- Coordinates: 21°12′0″N 94°1′0″E
- Country: Myanmar
- Division: Chin State
- District: Mindat District
- Township: Kanpetlet Township

Population (2005)
  - Religions: Christianity Buddhism
- Time zone: UTC+6.30 (MST)
- Climate: Cwa

Kanpetlet (Burmese: ကန်ပက်လက်မြို့, MLCTS: kan pak lak mrui, pronounced [kàɰ̃pɛʔlɛʔ mjo̰]) is a town in the Chin State of western Myanmar.

== History ==
Under British rule, Kanpetlet was one of the two districts in the Chin Hills. However, due to its remote location and a population too small to support development, it has become one of the least developed townships in Chin State and Myanmar.

The Chin Brotherhood Alliance captured the town on 21 December 2024, amidst the ongoing civil war.

== Geography ==
It is known for Mt. Victoria, the highest peak in the Chin Hills and one of the highest in western Myanmar, and Natmataung National Park, home to some of the world's rarest bird species.

== Demographics ==
Kanpetlet is the home of the southern Chin tribes of the Dai, Da Yindu, Uppu, Mun and Ng'gha clans. It can be found especially in ancient Burmese official literature. Around its border, there are Saw, Mindat, Paletwa, Setottayar and Minpyar townships.
