= Daai Chin =

Ethnic group in Myanmar

ဒိုင်ရ်ချင်း

Total population
- 35,000-45,000

Regions with significant populations
- Chin State, Myanmar

Languages
- Daai language

Religion
- Christianity, Animism

Related ethnic groups
- Chin people

The Daai are an ethnic group living in Chin State, Myanmar (Burma). The Daai comprise 32 Chin tribes, which have been recognized by the Government of Burma since 1890. According to a census by the State Peace and Development Council, the Daai are listed as the 62nd of the 135 recognized ethnic groups of Burma. The Daai primarily live in Mindat, Paletwa, Matupi, and Kanpetlet townships of southern Chin State. With more than 180 villages and a population estimated between 35,000 and 45,000, they represent a major ethnic group in the Southern Chin Hills.

== Ethnonyms ==
The name "Daai" is derived from a root in the Daai language family meaning "peace," "plain," or "harmony." According to Thang Hleih, "Daai" represents people who live peacefully, lovingly, and harmoniously. Despite the region’s mountainous nature, the name signifies "plain" or "valley people."

== History ==
The Daai-speaking region was independent until the British expedition in 1890, and was later annexed by the British Empire in 1897. The Daai language shows slight variation between sub-tribes. Their ethnic symbol is the khuum (rocket-tail dragon), and their royal flower is the ling leih (Bulbophyllum refractum, an orchid species). Today, about 99% of Daai people identify as Christians.

== Geographic distribution ==
The Daai-speaking region Map

The Daai inhabit a region in the southern part of Chin State, Myanmar, which lies within the country's western mountain zone. Myanmar is bordered by China to the north and northeast, Laos and Thailand to the east and southeast, India to the northwest, Bangladesh to the west, and the Andaman Sea to the south.

The Daai-speaking region is administratively divided into four regions within Chin State: Kanpetlet, Mindat, Matupi, and Paletwa. Each region is sometimes referred to by local names such as Kanpetlet Daai, Mindat Daai, Matu Daai, and Paletwa Daai. There are more than 180 Daai villages, comprising approximately 13% of the 1,355 villages in Chin State. Villages range in size from 10 to 140 houses. The largest is Majar Innu Village in Kanpetlet Township, located in the western central part of the Daai-speaking region.

The Daai-speaking region lies between 20˚42′ and 21˚35′ north latitude, and 93˚14′ and 94˚08′ east longitude. It spans parts of the western Mindat, northwestern Kanpetlet, northeastern Paletwa, and southeastern Matupi townships. The longest stretch of the Daai-speaking region is approximately 120 miles (193 km), while the narrowest part is around 60 miles (96 km). The terrain is mountainous, ranging from 800 to 3,200 meters above sea level, and is interlaced with brooks, streams, and small rivers such as the Lemro River and the Mone Stream (မုန်းချောင်း). Watercourses run north to south, creating deep valleys and gorges.

=== Diaspora in Malaysia ===
Some Daais have migrated to Malaysia due to political, cultural, and religious persecution in Myanmar. In Malaysia, many live as undocumented migrants, facing the risk of arrest, detention, whipping, and deportation. Without formal refugee camps, Daai refugees live in overcrowded apartments, urban slums, or makeshift jungle camps near construction sites.

Daai refugee communities are scattered across Malaysia in cities and towns such as Johor Bahru, Ipoh, the Cameron Highlands, Kalang, Kajang, and Rawang.

== Population ==
The total Daai population is estimated between 60,000 and 90,000, comprising roughly 15% of Chin State's population (estimated at 500,000). While most live in Myanmar, Daai communities are also found abroad. The Daai are descended from Tibetan, Tibeto-Burman, Kuki-Chin-Naga, and Kuki-Chin lineages.

== Education ==
The Daai-speaking region has limited educational infrastructure. Most villages have access to basic primary education, and some offer middle school (ages 5–14). However, higher education is available only in select villages. Increasingly, Daai youth are pursuing education in Christian colleges located in cities such as Yangon, Falam, Hakha, Mandalay, Kalay, Maymyo, Kyaukhtu, and Pakokku, as well as abroad in countries like India and the United States.

== Health ==
Some villages have government clinics and dispensaries, though these often lack medicine and medical staff. Villagers often travel to nearby Burmese towns to obtain treatment and medicines. Occasionally, government medical teams visit the Daai-speaking region to administer vaccinations and provide basic healthcare services.

== Language ==
All Daai tribes speak the Daai Chin language, a member of the Sino-Tibetan family. This should not be confused with other similarly named languages in the Tai-Kadai family. While dialects differ slightly between regions such as Kanpetlet and Matupi, they are generally mutually intelligible.

== Religion ==
Roughly four decades ago, most Daai practiced animism. In their traditional belief system, a Supreme Being called M'hnamnu was revered. Other titles used included Khyümhnam, Nukhyünu, and Pamhmampa, all referring to a divine creator or shelter. Scholar Ki Houng describes M'hnamnu as the righteous and holy creator of all things who does not dwell in this world. Ha Om further interprets M'hnamnu as the universe's life-giver, referred to by both maternal and paternal names. Rev. Manar Naing explains that "Mhmam" means God and "Nu" means noble, rendering the full meaning as "Noble God." Despite such beliefs, God has also been referred to as Pa Ngsim since 1975, meaning "Holy Father." The Daai believe M'hnamnu is beyond human understanding and invisible. A common phrase, "Jah hmuki ni lu khana ka" suggests that seeing M'hnamnu would bring immediate death. Today, around 99% of Daai people are Christians. The gospel was introduced to the region around 1970, about 156 years after the American missionary Adoniram Judson began his mission in Rangoon (now Yangon).

== Economy ==
The Daai practice shifting cultivation, known as taungya in Burmese and lou or lo in the Daai language. Farmers clear forest plots and grow crops for one to two years before moving to new land, allowing old plots to regenerate over a 10–11 year cycle.

Shifting cultivation is deeply rooted in Daai culture, forming the basis of both their economy and social life. Initially practiced for subsistence, it remains the main livelihood strategy, supporting families with food and providing income to meet basic needs.

The Daai cultivate crops such as rice, corn, millet, beans, cucumbers, pumpkins, gourds, eggplants, sweet potatoes, tomatoes, ginger, sesame, and celery. Planting occurs during the monsoon season (mid-April to June), with harvests in October and November. Agriculture is dependent on rainfall, and farming is primarily for subsistence.

The Daai-speaking region is largely undeveloped, and its economy relies on slash-and-burn or shifting cultivation. Transportation infrastructure and marketplaces are limited.

== See also ==
- Daai people, several ethnic groups in China's Yunnan Province
