= Kawang, Chin State =

Kawang
- Location in Burma
- Coordinates: 21°31′N 92°48′E
- Country: Myanmar
- Division: Chin State
- District: Mindat
- Township: Paletwa
- Elevation: 512 ft (156 m)
- Time zone: UTC+6.30 (MST)

Kawang is a town in Paletwa Township, Mindat District, in the Chin State of Myanmar.
