= Daai language =

Kuki-Chin language of Myanmar

Daai
- Region: Myanmar
- Ethnicity: Daai Chin
- Native speakers: 37,000 (2010)
- Language family: Sino-Tibetan: Tibeto-Burman; Central Tibeto-Burman (?); Kuki-Chin-Naga; Kuki-Chin; Southern; Daai

Language codes
- ISO 639-3: dao
- Glottolog: daai-1236

Daai (also known as Daai Chin), which borders the Mün and Ütbü language groups, is a Southern Kuki-Chin of Myanmar. It is spoken in 142 villages in Kanpetlet, Matupi, Mindat, and Paletwa townships in Chin State, Burma (Ethnologue). A writing system for the Daai language was created in 1976 by U Kheng Sho and Ms. Halga So Hartmann. However, it is stated that this writing system is not intended for all Daai people.

Mutual intelligibility among Nghngilo (Yang), Daai Yindu, and Mkui groups is high, but is lower among other groups. Daai has greater than 90% lexical similarity with Daai Yindu, Yang, Mkui, Duk, and Msang, 81%–88% with Ngxang (Paletwa township) and Kheng, 80% with Shiip (Matupi township), 91%–94% with Gah/Ng-Gha (part of Mün), and 81%–87% with Mün.

== Dialects ==
Ethnologue lists the following dialects of daai Chin.

- Ngxang
- Nghngilo (Yang)
- Ma-Tu
- Shiip
- Duk-Msang
- Kheng
- Mkuui
- Ngjääng
- Yet

== Phonology ==
=== Consonants ===
Daai has twenty-four consonant phonemes.

	Bilabial	Alveolar	Palatal	Velar	Glottal
Nasals	m̥ m	n̥ n		ŋ̊ ŋ	
Plosives	p pʰ b	t tʰ d		k kʰ	ʔ
Fricatives		s sʰ		x ɣ	h
Lateral Fricatives		ɬ			
Approximants	w	l	j		

=== Vowels ===
Daai has seven vowel phonemes, each with a phonemic length contrast.

	Front	Central	Back	
	Front	Central	Unrounded	Rounded
High	i iː		ɯ ɯː	u uː
Mid	ɛ ɛː	ə əː		ɔ ɔː
Low		a aː		

== Grammar ==
Daai Chin is an isolating or analytic language. There is no inflectional morphology at the word level; case, number, and tense are marked by clitics.

== Examples ==
Daai Chin	English
mthan	night
mpyong	mouth
kpyak	to destroy
pha	to arrive
Nghngaai-ktheih hmin lokti.	The mango fruits became ripe.
Mat jah mata i:ma am ngleh-ei ni.	They did not visit each other's houses.
