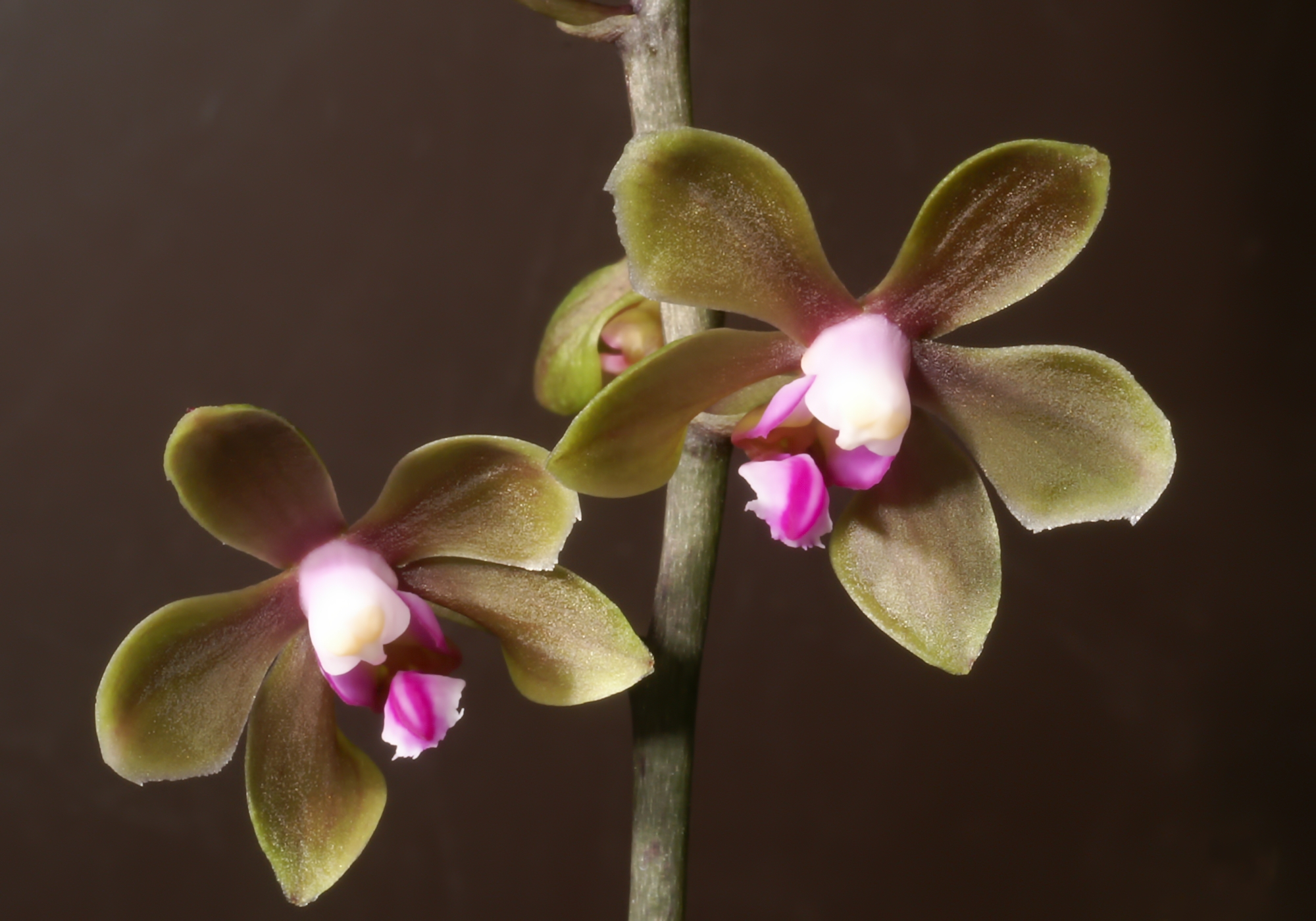

Scientific classification
- Kingdom: Plantae
- Clade: Tracheophytes
- Clade: Angiosperms
- Clade: Monocots
- Order: Asparagales
- Family: Orchidaceae
- Subfamily: Epidendroideae
- Genus: Phalaenopsis
- Species: P. stobartiana

Binomial name
- Phalaenopsis stobartiana Rchb.f.
- distribution of Phalaenopsis stobartiana

Synonyms
- Phalaenopsis wightii var. stobartiana (Rchb.f.) Burb.; Polychilos stobartiana (Rchb.f.) Shim; Kingidium stobartianum (Rchb.f.) Seidenf.; Doritis stobartiana (Rchb.f.) T.Yukawa & K.Kita; Phalaenopsis hainanensis Tang & F.T.Wang; Doritis hainanensis (Tang & F.T.Wang) T.Yukawa & K.Kita

= Phalaenopsis stobartiana =

Species of orchid

Phalaenopsis stobartiana, also known as 滇西蝴蝶兰 (dian xi hu die lan) in Chinese, is a species of epiphytic plant in the family Orchidaceae. It is endemic to Hainan, China. The specific epithet stobartiana refers to William Culley Stobart. The Stobart family were the principal landowners and colliery owners in the 19th century in England.

== Description ==
This species of miniature epiphytic herb has very short stems, which bear 3-4 ovate-lanceolate, oblong or elliptic, 7–11 cm long and 3-3.4 cm wide leaves. The leaves are deciduous, but are present at anthesis. In May to June 2–4 widely opening flowers with green sepals and petals, rose coloured column and labellum are produced on 1-2 ascending, 7–37 cm long, axillary racemes. The plants have massive root systems.

== Ecology ==
This species occurs epiphytically on tree trunks in forests at elevations of 1300–1400 m above sea level.

== Taxonomy ==
Phalaenopsis stobartiana is closely related to Phalaenopsis natmataungensis, from which it differs through plain coloured petals and sepals, as well as morphological details of the labellum. The petals and sepals of Phalaenopsis natmataungensis are mottled.

== Horticulture ==
Promising hybrids have been made in Japan. It may be used to create green-flowering Phalaenopsis. Under inclusion of its synonym Phalaenopsis hainanensis, the International Orchid Register of the Royal Horticultural Society lists 23 registered hybrids involving Phalaenopsis stobartiana.
