= Khomic languages =

Branch of Kuki-Chin languages

Khomic
- Geographic distribution: Myanmar, Bangladesh
- Ethnicity: Chin
- Linguistic classification: Sino-Tibetan: Tibeto-Burman; Central Tibeto-Burman (?); Kuki-Chin–Naga; Kuki-Chin; Khomic

Language codes
- Glottolog: khom1240 (Khomic)

The Khomic languages are a branch of Kuki-Chin languages proposed by Peterson (2017). They are spoken mostly in southern Chin State, Myanmar and in southeastern Bangladesh.

== Languages ==
Khomic languages include (Peterson 2017):

- Khumi
- Khami (Eastern Khumi)
- Lemi
- Mro
- Rengmitca
