= Nat Ma Taung =

Mountain in Myanmar

Mt.Victoria
- Khaw-nu-soum / Mount Victoria
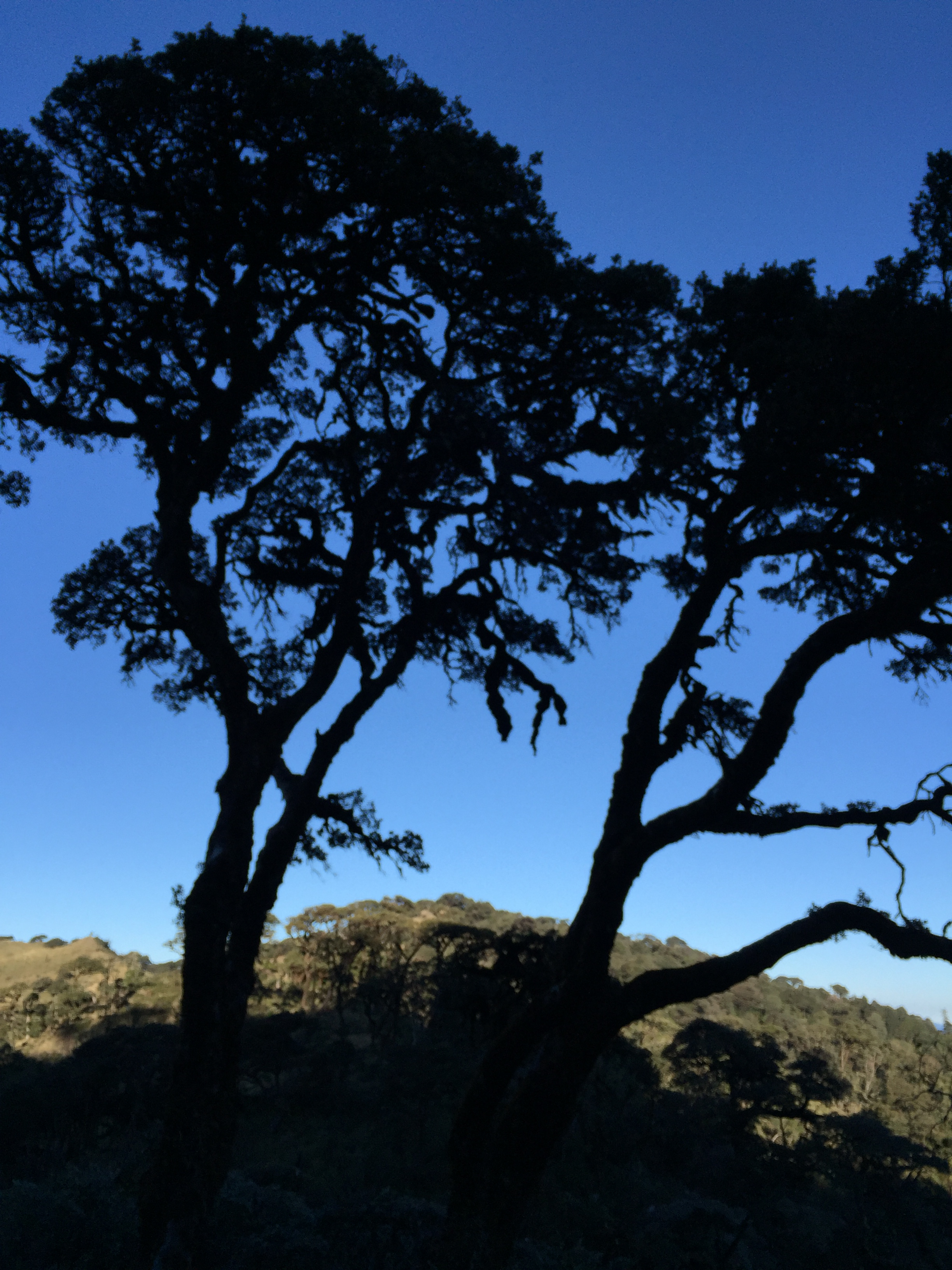
- Nat Ma Taung/Mount Victoria

Highest point
- Elevation: 3,070 m (10,070 ft)
- Prominence: 2,148 m (7,047 ft)
- Listing: List of Ultras of Southeast Asia; Ribu
- Coordinates: 21.2336°N 93.9031°E; Metadata extended details of photo

Geography
- Location within Myanmar
- Location: Chin State, Myanmar
- Parent range: Chin Hills

Climbing
- First ascent: unknown
- Easiest route: climb

Nat Ma Taung (Burmese: နတ်မတောင်; Khaw-nu-soum or Khonuamthung in Chin), also known as Mount Victoria, is the highest mountain in Chin State of Northwestern Myanmar.

== Geography ==
With a height of 3,070 metres (10,070 ft) above sea level and a prominence of 2,148 metres (7,047 ft), Nat Ma Taung is one of the ultra prominent peaks of Southeast Asia.

Nat Ma Taung is located in three townships: Kanpatlet, Mindat and Matupi. The mountain is part of the Chin Hills range.

== Ecology ==
Nat Ma Taung is in the Chin Hills–Arakan Yoma montane forests ecoregion. Surrounded at lower elevations by tropical and subtropical moist forests, Nat Ma Taung's higher elevations form a sky island, home to many temperate and alpine species typical of the Himalaya further north, and many endemic species.

== Climate ==
The mountaintop has a borderline alpine climate (Köppen climate classification ET) along with Subtropical Highland climate (Köppen Cwc/Cwb) in the nearby surroundings terrain.

Climate data for Nat Ma Taung (Mount Victoria) Summit (3053m; 10070ft)
Month	Jan	Feb	Mar	Apr	May	Jun	Jul	Aug	Sep	Oct	Nov	Dec	Year
Record high °C (°F)	16.4 (61.5)	19.6 (67.3)	23.2 (73.8)	26.4 (79.5)	25.4 (77.7)	22.5 (72.5)	22.4 (72.3)	20.5 (68.9)	20.1 (68.2)	19.8 (67.6)	17.5 (63.5)	15.6 (60.1)	26.4 (79.5)
Mean daily maximum °C (°F)	7.8 (46.0)	13.8 (56.8)	16.7 (62.1)	20.2 (68.4)	18.4 (65.1)	17.7 (63.9)	17.7 (63.9)	17.7 (63.9)	15.3 (59.5)	14.9 (58.8)	13.2 (55.8)	9.7 (49.5)	15.3 (59.5)
Mean daily minimum °C (°F)	−2.4 (27.7)	3.3 (37.9)	7.5 (45.5)	9.5 (49.1)	8.7 (47.7)	8.6 (47.5)	8.6 (47.5)	8.1 (46.6)	7.2 (45.0)	5.5 (41.9)	1.2 (34.2)	−1.7 (28.9)	5.3 (41.6)
Record low °C (°F)	−13.6 (7.5)	−7.8 (18.0)	−3.4 (25.9)	−1.9 (28.6)	2.3 (36.1)	3.5 (38.3)	4.7 (40.5)	4.6 (40.3)	2.4 (36.3)	0.8 (33.4)	−6.5 (20.3)	−12.9 (8.8)	−13.6 (7.5)
Average precipitation mm (inches)	14.8 (0.58)	7.7 (0.30)	23.4 (0.92)	67.9 (2.67)	105.6 (4.16)	178.7 (7.04)	223.4 (8.80)	209.2 (8.24)	338.0 (13.31)	201.2 (7.92)	79.8 (3.14)	20.4 (0.80)	1,470.1 (57.88)

== Gallery ==
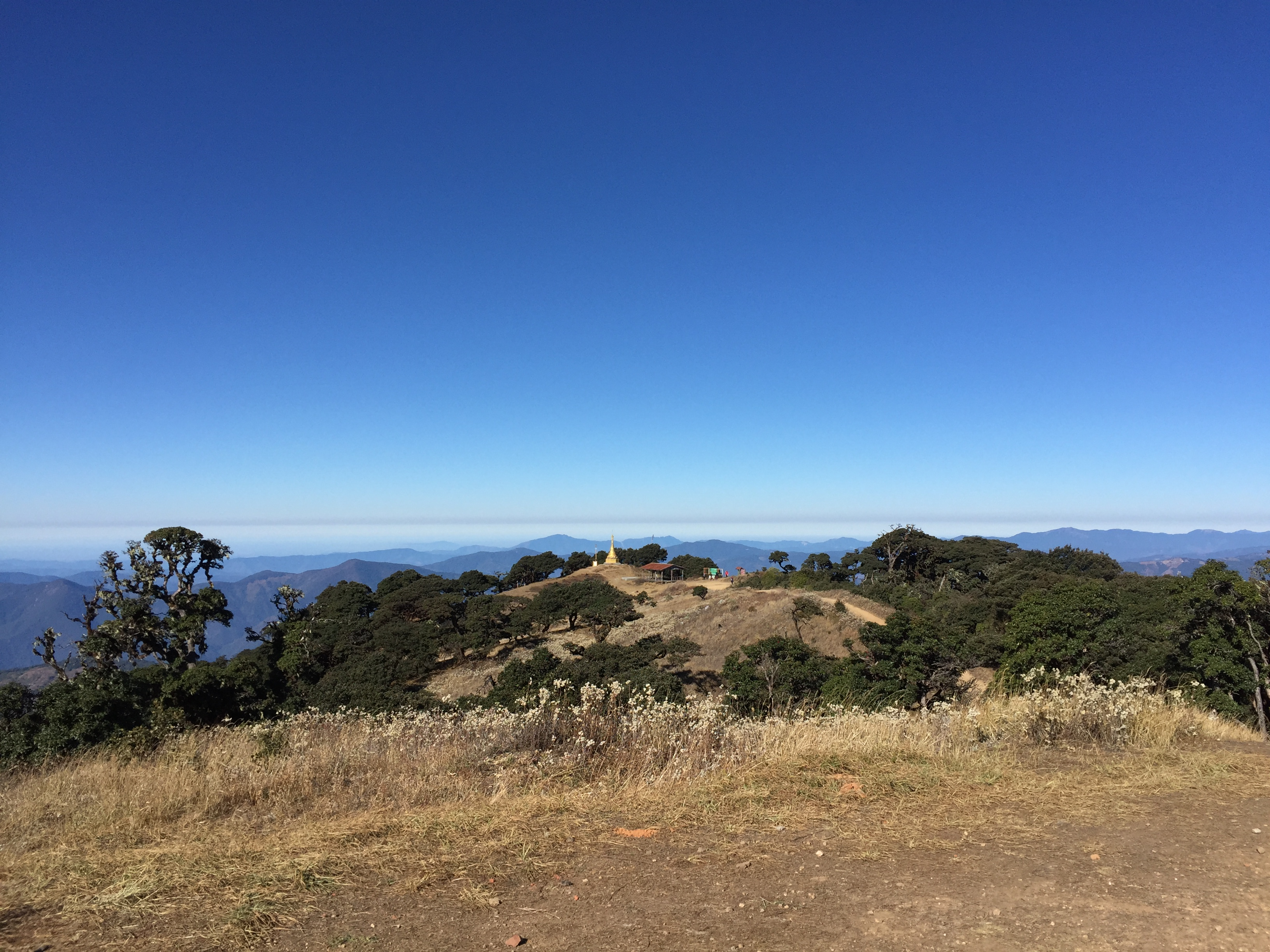
View from Nat Ma Taung's summit

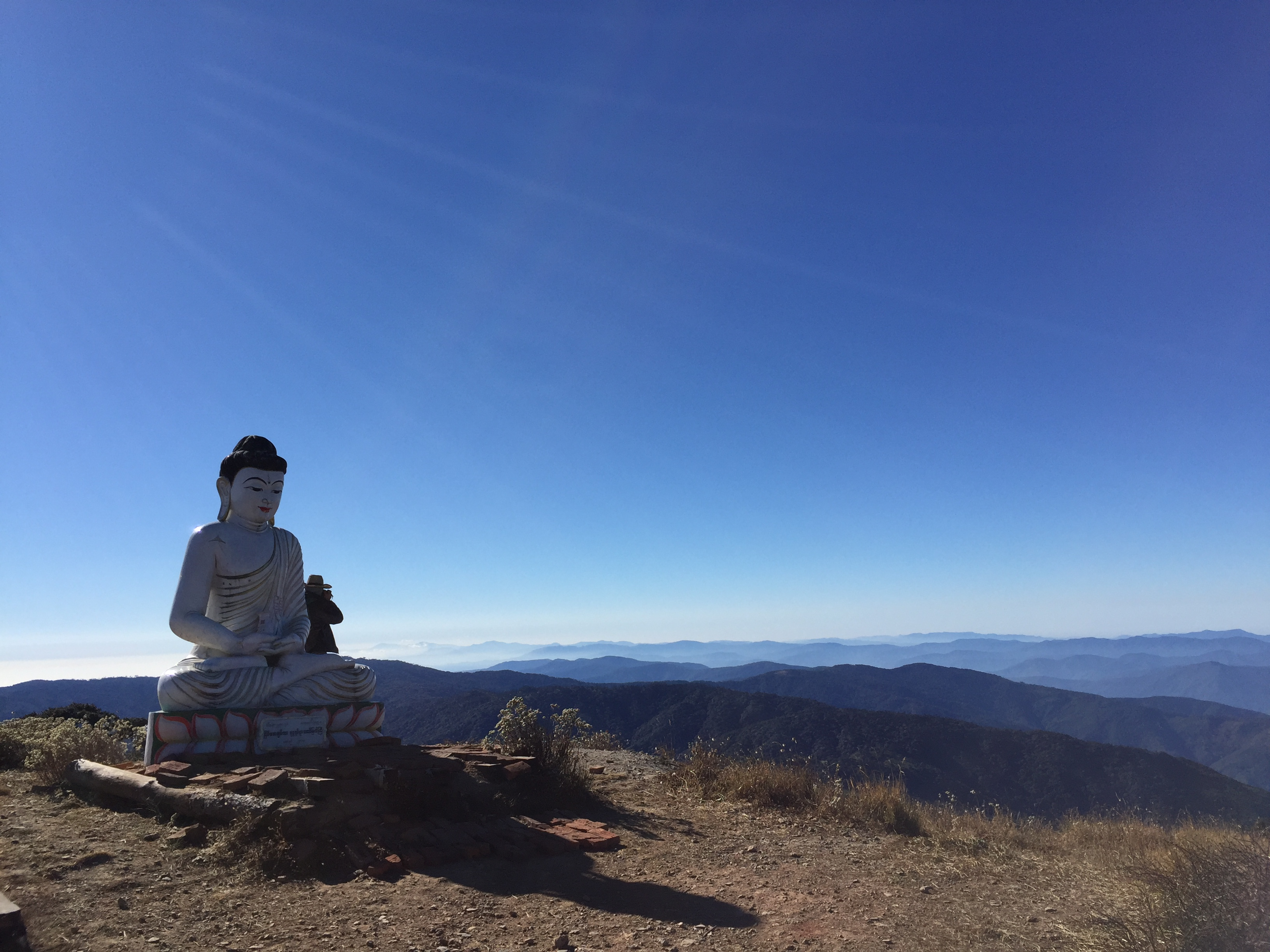
View from Nat Ma Taung's summit

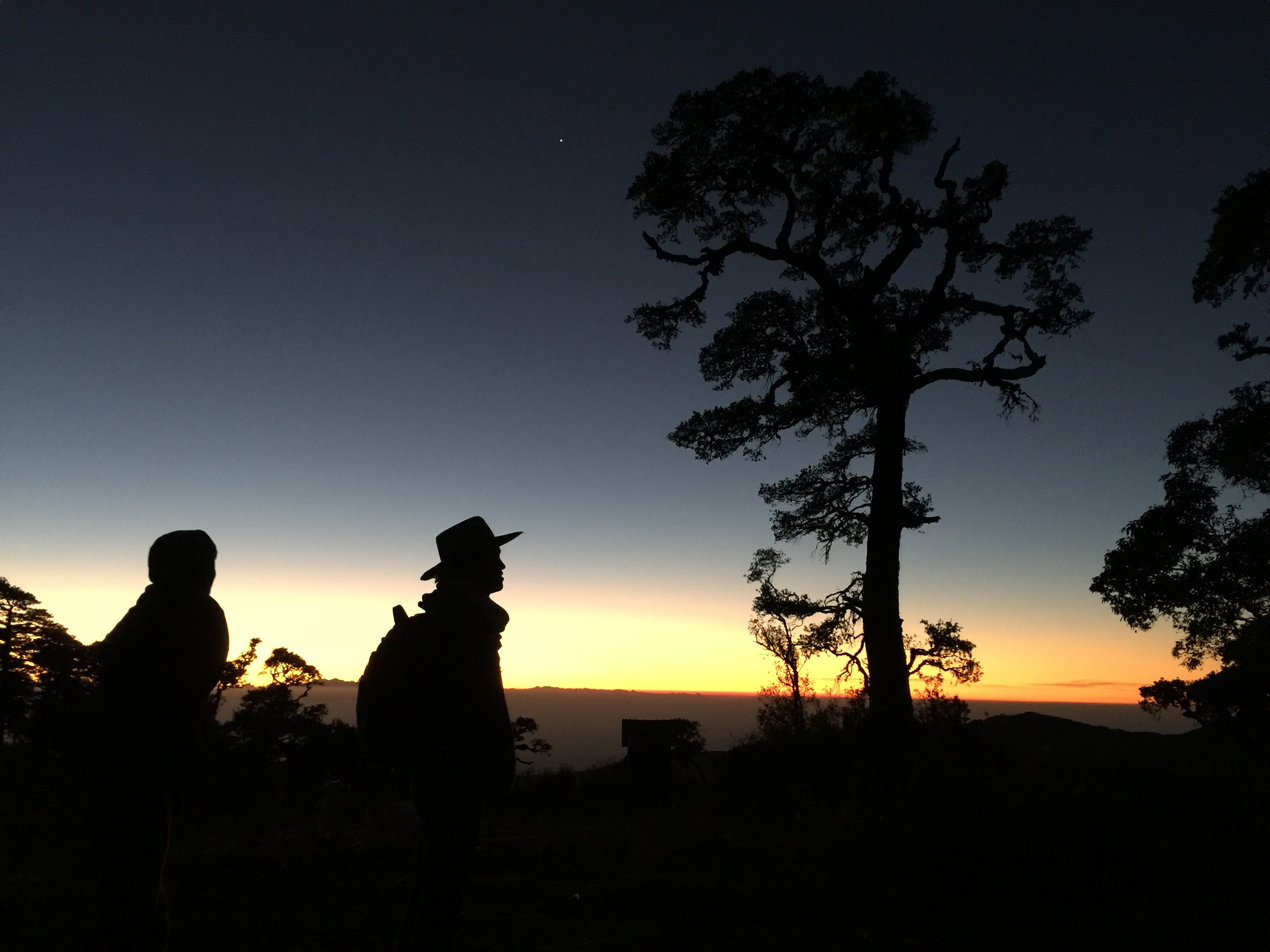
Morning view with travelers from Nat Ma Taung

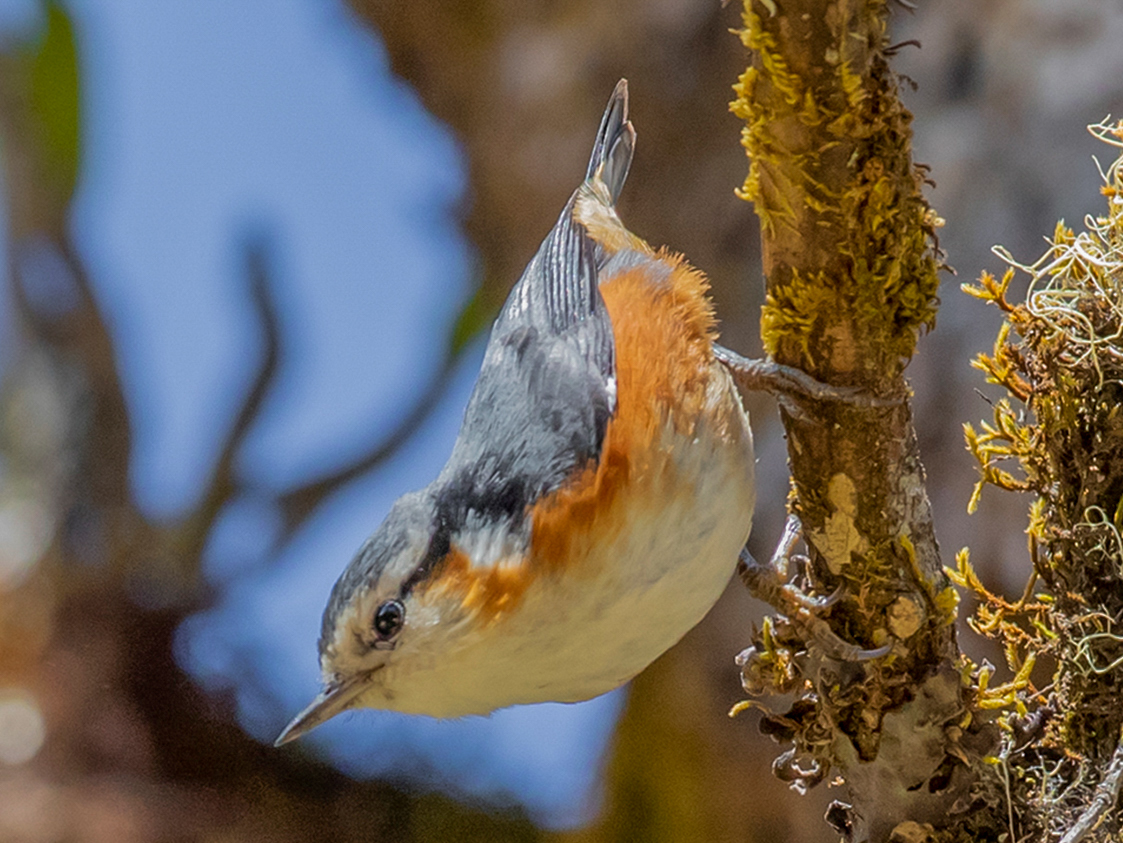
A White-browed Nuthatch, a bird species endemic to the Nat Ma Taung

== See also ==
- List of ultras of Southeast Asia
- List of mountains in Myanmar
- List of Southeast Asian mountains
