= Läoktü language =

Kuki-Chin language spoken in Burma

Ekai
- Läoktü
- Region: Burma
- Native speakers: 6,650 (2024)
- Language family: Sino-Tibetan: (Tibeto-Burman); Kuki-Chin; Southern; Ekai

Language codes
- ISO 639-3: cey
- Glottolog: ekai1234 (retired for Bookkeeping)

Läoktü (Läoktü Chin), or Ekai (Ekai Chin), is a Kuki-Chin language of Burma. It was formerly classified as a dialect of Laitu due to acquired bilingualism.
