= Mong Wong =

Ethnic group in northern Myanmar

မုန်းဝန်း

Total population
- 60,000

Regions with significant populations
- Myanmar: Kutkai Township

Languages
- Southwestern mandarin

Religion
- Theravada Buddhism

Related ethnic groups
- Kokang people, other Han chinese

The Mong Wong (Chinese: 勐穩; pinyin: Měngwěn; Burmese: မုန်းဝန်း; also spelled Mong Woon, Monwone or Monwun), officially known as the Mong Wong Bamar (မုန်းဝန်းဗမာ), are a Yunnanese-speaking community residing primarily in Tamoenye, located in Kutkai Township of northern Shan State, Myanmar. They are estimated to number around 60,000 and are recognized as the largest ethnic group in Kutkai Township, comprising approximately 28.6% of the local population. They are concentrated in the town of Tamoenye. The name Mong Wong comes from the name of a village in Kutkai.

== History ==
The Mong Wong are ethnic Yunnanese. Many trace their ancestry to migrations from China's Yunnan Province approximately 200 years ago. In the final days of President Thein Sein’s administration (2016), the government officially recognized the Mong Wong as “Mong Wong (Bamar)” on national identity documents, granting them Burmese citizenship and citizenship scrutiny cards. This designation, which aligned them with the majority Bamar ethnic group, sparked controversy due to their clear Chinese heritage. The Immigration Department explained the decision had been made to recognized the cooperation of the Mong Wong in supporting national security interests. The Mong Wong militia supports the Tatmadaw (Myanmar's military) in regional conflicts. The militia is led by Myint Lwin, a businessman and Union Solidarity and Development Party politician with close ties to Than Shwe and Khin Nyunt, two high-ranking military officials. The move also bolstered the population of pro-government forces in the Kutkai region.

== Culture ==
The Mong Wong community exhibits strong Yunnanese cultural influences. Traditional attire for women includes blue and black high-collared dresses, though this practice has diminished over time. Southwestern Mandarin ( Yunnanese ) is predominantly spoken within the community, with some individuals also fluent in Burmese and Shan. Cultural practices such as playing mahjong are common, reflecting their Yunnanese heritage.
