= Taungtha, Magway =

Taungtha
- Village
- Location in Burma
- Coordinates: 20°45′N 94°50′E
- Country: Burma
- Region: Magway Region
- District: Magway District
- Township: Chauk Township
- Time zone: UTC+6.30 (MST)

Taungtha is a small village in Chauk Township, Magway Division, north-central Myanmar, next to the village of Kyatkan.
