= Neihsial =

Regions with significant populations
- Churachandpur, Senapati, Chandel, Tamenglong District Manipur, India, Assam and Nagaland. Chin Hills or Chin State(Burma).

Languages
- Neihsial Pau

Religion
- Vokpi Dawi Hou (traditional religion) and Christianity

Related ethnic groups
- Chin, Kuki and Mizo

The Neihsiel ethnic group is concentrated primarily in the Churachandpur, Senapati, Chandel and Tamenglong district of the Indian state of Manipur, shown on this map in red.

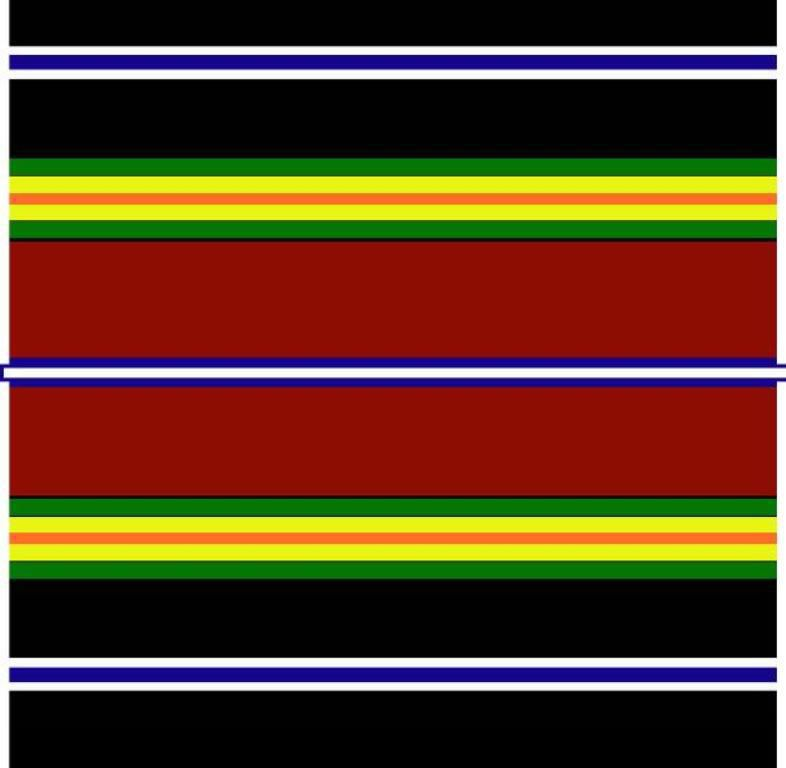
Neihsial traditional attire pattern

The Neihsial is an ethnic group found in northeastern India and parts of Myanmar. Members of this group are largely concentrated in the Churachandpur, Senapati, Chandel District and Tamenglong district of the Indian state of Manipur. There is also a sizable population in the neighboring Chin State of Myanmar.

The Neihsial speak a Tibeto-Burman language which is unique and different from the Vaiphei and Gangte tribal dialects. Some of the Neihsial are scattered among the Vaiphei, Gangte, Paite and Thadou tribes in India, where as a large number of significant proportion speak the Neihsial dialect and followed its traditions. The word Neihsial is spelled in various variations such as Neihsiel and Neihsel due to others dialects and literature influences. Currently, the Neihsial are not recognized as a tribe in India. Instead, the Neihsial are classified under the nomenclature Zomi and Kuki.

The Neihsial practice a subsistence form of agriculture, Jhum or slash-and-burn cultivation.

== Origin ==
The meaning associated behind the word Neihsial is a combination of the words: neih means to have/possess or owned and sial means mithun (name of animal) or to boast. Scholars believe that the name was derived from the phrase "Owner of many mithun" or "boasting of wealth.". As is the case with other neighboring tribes, the genesis of Neihsial cannot be effectively traced and produced, due to the lack of written historical evidence. The various Neihsial clans are scattered amongst various other Zo ethnic dailects, such as Gangte, Thadou and Paite. But one thing remains certain. That, they have lineal connection with the Vaiphei speaking group is undeniable as various forms of customary practices such as the payment of sating (meat) or elder brother's portion of meat have been attributed to the Khaute/Khaupi elders. Mentions were also made by many other researchers of which mention be made by the Lotjem clan of the Thadou speaking tribe describing the Neihsial Pa (pa stand as father/man) as "Sakhaupi Kuohpa" which means a man with a big pouch. Through the local traditions and oral traditions it was known that the cruelties and hardships their ancestor suffered in the Kale-Chindwin valley at the hands of the Kawls (Burmans) were so severe that it led to the first wave of migration straight into the Arakans in about the year A.D. 1000. The second wave moved over to the Chin hills during A.D. 1200–1400 taking shelter in whatever shelter was available—tick woods, crests of rocks and even caves, and they referred to one such big cave where they took shelter known as khuul.

The Neihsial tribe is a composition of "bawngthum" meaning three groups of clans: namely The Nunthuk clans, The Tungling Clans and the Haulai clans. The Nunthuk group consist of the Nunthuk clans, Thaanhing clans, Thukneel clans, Thaanvuum clans, Thuklai clans and Chiljaang clans. The Tungling group consist of the Tungling clan, Singtou clan, Singbul clan, Singlul clan, Daalvung clan, Santou clan, Timtong clan, Tuolkhen clan, Dolbak clan, Banlawng clan, Aikhoh clan, Khuptong clans - Kipging clan, Ngaithuom clan, Bawngmei clan, Lamthang clan, Sumai clan and Bianpi clan. The Haulai group consist of Haulai clans- Kimdeih clan, Chonmang clan, Ngalkip clan, Lengen clan and Thahgen clan with two more undiscovered clans from Haulai sept.

The Neihsial people wander among the other tribes (Thadou, Paite, Vaiphei, Gangte, Hmar, Mizo, Zou etc.) after the destruction of the Sialgam (Sialthah-tuithang gam), consisting of the two capitals Sialthah Kulhpi and Tuithang Kulhpi. The region under the Sialthah Kulhpi was called Sialthahgam and the region under Tuithang Kulhpi was called Tuithanggam. The Neihsial people speak a unique language called Neihsial Pau. Neihsial people living in and around Churachandpur District and Tamenglong District of Manipur still use Neihsial Pau.

== Religion ==
The traditional religion of the Neihsial ( i.e VOKPI DAWI ) is a combination of ancestor worship and animism. The Neihsial believed in the existence of a supreme deity whom they called "Pathian". Besides Pathian, the Neihsial revered and feared a number of supernatural beings. Sacrifices of fowls, pigs, dogs and goats were made to appease the deities. The important traditional festivals of the Neihsial include Sa-ai, Gallu-ai and Lawmzu nek. Above all the Neihsial tribe practice "VOKPI DAWI LAAM" Which is the supreme of all their traditional religious dance. The most important and unique festival of the Neihsial tribe was "SIAL-KUT". This very SIAL-KUT is unique and is famous for its role in the socio-religious life of the people. During the late 19th and early 20th centuries, foreign missionaries, mostly from the Western world, converted many Neihsials to Christianity. They began to abandoned the traditional believes and faiths and discarded all kinds of traditional religions and worships.

By the 20th century, the Neihsial Christian Association (NCA) was formed on May 11, 1989, at Neihsial Veng, Lamka, Churachandpur, Manipur. At its young stage, they were under the Manipur Christian Organization. After some years they formed alignment with the Wesleyan Methodist Church for about seven years. After parting from Methodist Church they reorganize NCA and function independently till these day. The denominational headquarters of NCA is at Neihsial Veng itself. They believe in trinity: the father, the son and the Holy Spirit. The NCA is headed by one executive secretary, who is assisted by clerk and choukider. There is an executive committee to deal with any important matters concerning with the institution.

== Moral values of the Neihsial ==
The Neihsial society is patriarchal. It is patrilineal and patrilocal with a focus on the extended family. In the Neihsial society, it is a traditional practice that husband and wife never use each other's proper names as a sign of respect. Children also never use their parents' names. The parents are addressed as "Pa" (father) and "Nu" (Mother). The father and mother of another family are addressed by elders in the name of their eldest child, preceded by "Pa" or "Nu".
