= Uppu language =

Kuki-Chin language of Myanmar

Uppu
- Chinbon
- Native to: Myanmar
- Native speakers: 44,000 (2017)
- Language family: Sino-Tibetan: Tibeto-Burman; Central Tibeto-Burman (?); Kuki-Chin–Naga; Kuki-Chin; Southern; Uppu

Language codes
- ISO 639-3: cnb
- Glottolog: chin1478

Uppu or Chinbon Chin is a Southern Kuki-Chin language dialect cluster of Myanmar, Bangladesh and India.

== Geographical distribution ==
Chinbon (Uppu) is spoken in the following townships of Myanmar.

- Chin State: Kanpetlet and Paletwa townships
- Magway Region: Saw and Sidoktaya townships
- Rakhine State: Minbya township

Mayin and Longpaw have 84–91% intelligibility with the Uppu dialects, and 90% intelligibility with Minkya dialect.
