= Cumtu Chin people =

Tribe from Rakhine State

Cumtu
စုမ်းတူချင်း

Total population
- 16,000 (2025)

Regions with significant populations
- Rakhine State; Ann Township, Kyauktaw, Minbya, Myebon Township; Yangon Region

Languages
- Cumtu Chin language

Religion
- Christianity; Buddhism; Animism

Related ethnic groups
- Chin people

The Cumtu Chin people, also known as Sumtu or Sunghtu, are one of the tribes of the Chin peoples. They are native to northern Rakhine State and are one of the 61 Chin tribes that don't live in Chin State, Myanmar.

== Religion and culture ==
The Cumtu Chin are predominantly Christian, with minorities practicing Theravada Buddhism and animism. Traditionally, most Cumtu Chin people followed Buddhism, but after the 1970s, many began converting to Christianity.

Textile weaving is common among Cumtu Chin women; some sell their work due to poverty-related issues. In the past, the Cumtu Chin were one of the dozen or so Chin tribes that tattooed girls' faces. The practice was banned in 1976, and women who received tattoos have largely died since then.
