= Mro-Khimi people =

Ethnic group in Myanmar

Mro-Khimi
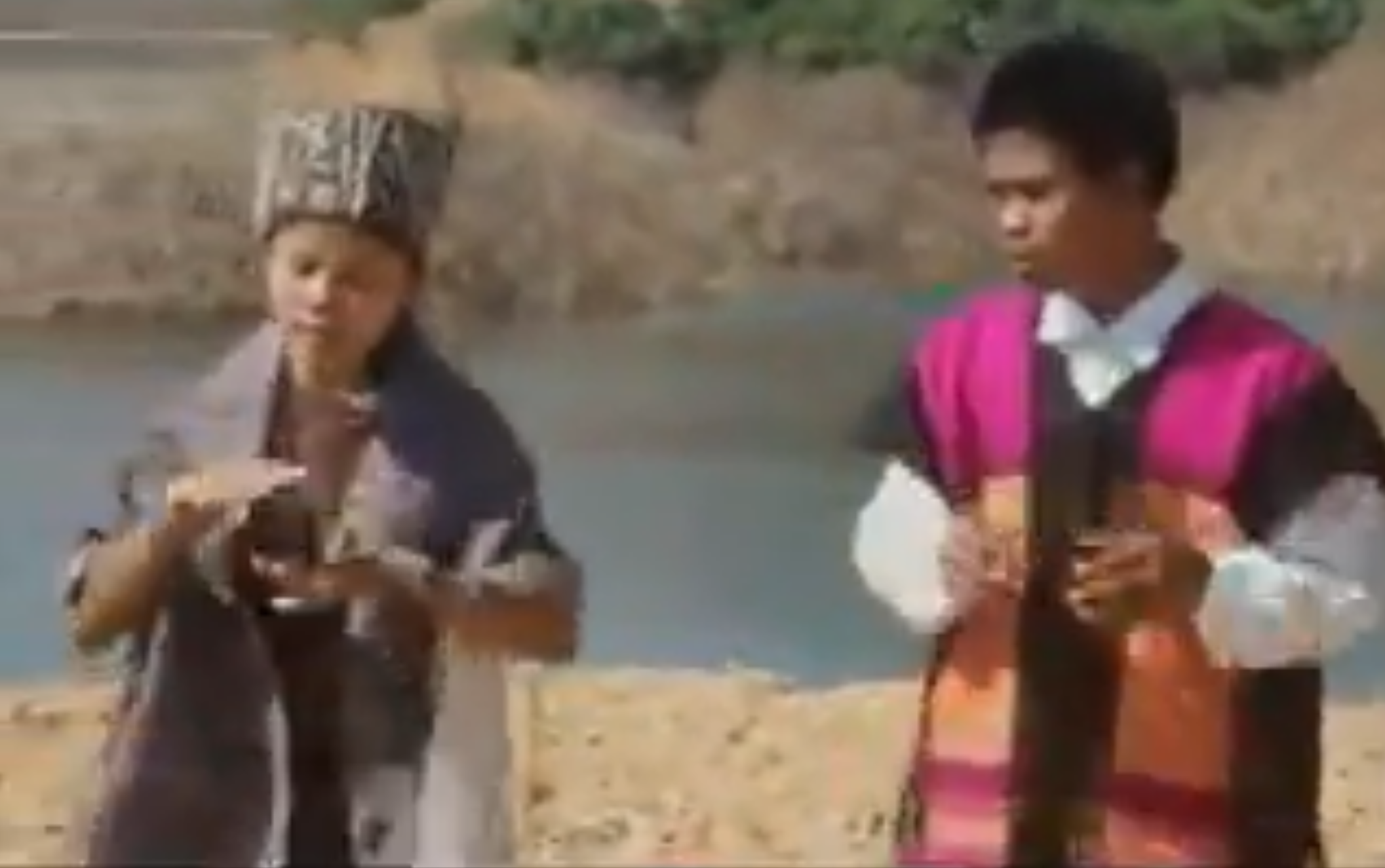

Total population
- 77,527–83,000 (2004, est.)

Regions with significant populations
- Myanmar (Chin State, Rakhine State)
- Myanmar: 83,000

Languages
- Mro-Khimi language (dialects: Arang, Xengna, Xata, Vakung)

Religion
- Buddhism (55%), Animism (37.6%), Christianity (7.4%)

Related ethnic groups
- Chin people

The Mro-Khimi people (Burmese: မြို(ခမိ) or မြိုလူမျိုး), also known as Mro, Awa Khami Mro, Wakim, Mro Chin, or Awa Khami, are one of the 135 officially recognized ethnic groups of Myanmar. They are considered a subgroup of both the Chin and Rakhine peoples. The Mro-Khimi inhabit various parts of Rakhine State and Chin State, including the townships of Matupi and Paletwa, and regions such as Samechaung and Michaung. There are more than 100 clans.

They speak the Mro-Khimi language, a member of the Kuki-Chin languages within the Sino-Tibetan languages family. The group maintains distinct cultural traditions and customs.

== Ethnonyms ==
They call themselves as Khami, which means 'human'.

== History ==
=== Origins ===
According to traditional accounts, the Mro-Khimi people originated from a region known as Twipin (Tibet). From there, they gradually migrated southward, residing in Rokon for approximately thirty years. They then settled at Cha Phawi Mountain for about 300 years, before moving to Khang Lyhn Mawi in Paletwa, and eventually into Rakhine State.

According to the Rakhine chronicles, the Mro people were the first people to enter Arakan. The Mro people once ruled as emperors in Rakhine State and established two "Mro" dynasties. The dynasty lasted for about 25 years, from 131 AD to 156 AD.

During the reign of King Dasara (c. AD 485), Mro-Khimi chief Rahoila was sent to find the lost statue of Mahamuni. Chronicles refer to “Kwae Mwae Mro”, indicating early Buddhist influence.

The first known Christian conversion among the Mro-Khimi occurred in April 1932 in the Mi Chaung region of Paletwa.

In July 1960, the Gospel of the Mara reached Mro-Khimi communities, though many continued traditional spirit offerings.

== Language and literature ==
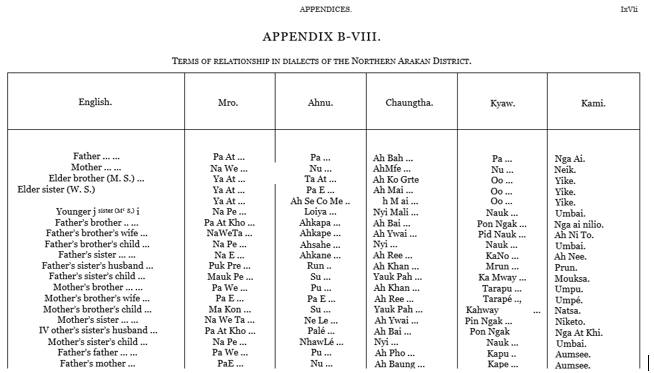
Comparison of Mro Language and Kami Language

The Mro-Khimi language is spoken in the townships of Paletwa (Chin State) and Kyauktaw, Buthidaung, Ponnagyun, Pauktaw, Mrauk U, and Maungdaw (Rakhine State).

Four primary dialects are recognized:

- Arang (also: Ahraing Khami, Areung, Aroeng)
- Xengna (Hrengna)
- Xata
- Vakung (Wakun, Wakung)

The Vakung dialect is the most widely spoken and understood. Additional dialects mentioned by Horney (2009) include Aryn, Dau, Khuitupui, Likhy, Pamnau, Tuiron, Xautau, and Xienau. Phonological studies have focused on Vakung and Xautau dialects.

The Mro-Khimi language shows around 78% lexical similarity with Khumi (Khimi) and about 39% with Mrucha (Mru).

The Mro-Khimi writing system was developed in 1997 using the Roman alphabet by U Kyaw Tha Aung (KEF), with the help of German scholars Dr. Kenneth Greggerson and Helga.

== Religion ==
Traditionally, the Mro-Khimi practiced animism, worshipping guardian spirits known as nats. The chief deity, “KNIQKHOEQMAQ,” is considered the creator of the world and of the Khimi people. Other important spirits include:

- “Eain Sout Nat” – spirit of the home
- “Yar Sout Nat” – spirit of land/agriculture

The name “KNIQKHOEQMAQ” comes from the words for “sun” (“Kani”) and “universe” (“Khoeqmaq”), meaning "creator who owns the sun and universe". This belief system influenced later conversions to Buddhism and Christianity.
