= Yabein =

Historical people group in Myanmar

ယဘိန်း

Regions with significant populations
- British Burma: Prome District

Languages
- Burmese

Religion
- Theravada Buddhism

Related ethnic groups
- Bamar people

The Yabein people were a marginalised social class of people historically associated with the silkworm industry in Burma (now Myanmar). Predominantly of Burman (Bamar) origin, they were known for their involvement in silkworm breeding, particularly along the slopes of the Pegu Range, including Paukkaung Township near Prome (now Pyay). The Yabeins were a rural people who adopted silkworm-rearing as they moved from cultivated plains into jungle areas, and were outcast from mainstream Burmese society due to their association with the silkworm industry. This practice, seen as subsidiary to more dominant agricultural work such as taungya (shifting cultivation), gradually declined.

== Names ==
The term "Yabein" was originally applied only to Burmans who engaged in the silkworm trade, and was never used for other ethnic groups such as the Chins. Over time, the term fell out of use and was replaced by "po-mwe-tha," (ပိုးမွေးသား) a general term meaning silkworm-breeder, which carried no negative connotation. Although "Yabein" was occasionally used pejoratively, its meaning evolved, and in some cases it came to signify "rustic" or "clodhopper".

== History ==
The cultural origins of the Yabeins are debated. Historical accounts describe the Yabeins as a mysterious group of uncertain origin who were almost entirely engaged in silk production. One theory suggests that silkworm culture predates Buddhism in the region, and that the Yabeins retreated from mainstream Buddhist society, as Buddhist precepts forbade the taking of life. Another theory posits that the Yabeins were a remnant of broken or obscure clans, such as the Danus or the Danaws, who had limited historical documentation and may be counted among Burma's many "lost tribes."

While they were Buddhists, some Yabeins began breeding silkworms—an act that involved killing the chrysalis and was thus seen as incompatible with Buddhist beliefs about reincarnation and non-violence. As a result, Yabeins were viewed with disdain and suspicion, often living in isolated villages and developing a patois distinct from other Burmese dialects. By 1891, this patois had vanished.

== Population ==
Historical population
Year	Pop.	±%
1901	2,252	—
1891	2,197	−2.4%
1881	2,714	+23.5%
1871	1,774	−34.6%

In the 1881 census, only 436 individuals reported speaking Yabein, a distinct Burmese dialect. By 1891, the language was considered extinct. Population records of silkworm breeders and their dependents reflect this decline. The fading of both the occupation and the associated identity of the Yabeins was due in part to the low social status of silkworm-rearing and the increasing dominance of other agricultural practices. Over time, the Yabein were reabsorbed into the Bamar group.
