= Rungtu language =

Kuki-Chin language of Burma

Rungtu
- Taungtha
- Region: Burma
- Ethnicity: Taungtha people
- Native speakers: 4,000 (2016)
- Language family: Sino-Tibetan: (Tibeto-Burman); Kuki-Chin; Southern; Rungtu

Language codes
- ISO 639-3: rtc
- Glottolog: rung1263 Rungtu Chin

Rungtu (Rungtu Chin), also known as Taungtha (Burmese: တောင်သားဘာသာစကား), is a moribund Kuki-Chin language of Burma spoken by the Taungtha people. It is spoken in 35 villages in Htilin, Kyaukhtu, and Saw townships, Magway Region. There are 3 dialects, namely Northern Rungtu, Central Rungtu, and Southern Rungtu.

The Rungtu dialects share 94%–96% lexical similarity. Rungtu shares 60%–66% lexical similarity with Rawngtu Chin.

== See also ==
- Taungtha people
- Welaung language
