= Hpon language =

Burmish language

Hpon
- Hpun
- Native to: Myanmar
- Region: upper Irrawaddy River
- Ethnicity: 1,500 (2007)
- Extinct: by 2007
- Language family: Sino-Tibetan: (Tibeto-Burman); Lolo–Burmese; Burmish; Burmic; Hpon

Language codes
- ISO 639-3: hpo
- Glottolog: hpon1238
- ELP: Hpon

Hpon (Burmese: ဖွန်းဘာသာ; also spelled Hpun) is an extinct Burmish language spoken by older adults in the gorges of the upper Irrawaddy River of Burma, north of Bhamo. There were two dialects, northern and southern. The language was phonologically more conservative than other 'Kachinised' Burmish languages.
