= Mindat District =

District of Myanmar

Coordinates: 21°28′N 93°24′E

- Interactive map of Mindat District
- Time zone: UTC+6:30 (MST)

Mindat District (Burmese: မင်းတပ်ခရိုင်) is a district in the Chin State of Myanmar. It consists of two townships and 840 villages.

Location in Chin state

== History ==
In 1948, after the formation of the constitution for the Union of Burma, Pakokku province was created with two districts - Pakokku District and Mindat District. They comprised a total of 11 townships - Pakokku (capital city), Mindat, Yesagyo, Pauk, Seikphyu, Myaing, Gangaw, Htilin, Saw, Kanpetlet, and Matupi.

On March 2, 1962 the military led by General Ne Win staged a coup d'état, putting Burma under the direct military rule. A new constitution of the Socialist Republic of the Union of Burma was established on May 4, 1974.

Pakokku province was then broken up in a fashion whereby Pakokku District was added to the Magway Division, and Mindat District was added to Chin State.

== Townships ==
Mindat District contains the townships of Mindat and Kanpetlet.
