= Kʼchò language =

Sino-Tibetan language spoken in Myanmar

Kʼchò
- Müün (Mün)/Ng’mèèn/K'cho Chin/Mindat Chin/Cho/'Cho
- Region: Myanmar
- Native speakers: 15,000 (2011)
- Language family: Sino-Tibetan: Tibeto-Burman; Central Tibeto-Burman (?); Kuki-Chin–Naga; Kuki-Chin; Southern; Kʼchò

Language codes
- ISO 639-3: mwq
- Glottolog: munc1235

Kʼchò (IPA: /ʔkʰɣɔ̀:/), or Mün, is a Kuki-Chin language of Myanmar. After a survey conducted in 2005 in Southern Chin State, Mang estimated the K’chò Region to be Mindat Township /mìndàt/, Kanpetlet Township /kanpètlèt/ and one village in Matupi /màtupi/ or /bàtǔ/. A written script for Kʼchò was created in 1929 by Rev. Dr. Herbert Cope, U Aung Dwe, and U Mang Kin.

== Names ==
Kʼchò /ʔkʰɣɔ̀:/ is the native term for the people and the language. Alternate names have included Cho, K’cho, 'Cho, K’cho Chin, Mindat, Mün/Müün, Ng'men/Ng'meen.

- Kʼchò is thought to be related to other native terms for Chin tribes, such as Zo, Kkhyou, Laizo, Asho and Hyow (Mang 2006: 4, So-Hartmann 2009:19).
- Müün is reported to be the group named after a mountain in the Hlet Lòng area. The form Ng'Müün is used by So-Hartmann (2009: 20, 25), but is not known by the K'cho people (Mang 2006:2).
- Ng'mèèn is said to be a K'hngì Yung term referring to those north of their river area in what is now Mìndàt (including further north of it). It is not clear whether the term Ng'mèèn includes Nìtŭ and Hlet Lòng or not (Mang 2016).
- The British initially adopted the name Chinbok (Burmese: ချင်းပုတ်), but this turned out to be a derogatory name applied to other close languages, and it has been abandoned for those reasons.

== Dialects ==
After a sociolinguistics survey in the K'cho speaking area in 2005, Kee Shein Mang, a linguist and a native speaker of Kʼchò (Hmǒng-kcha dialect group) recognised the following dialects (Mang 2006:1-4, and Mang and Nolan 2010b:35)

- Hmǒng-K'cha, Mang’s term (2006:4, 2016) spoken between the Hmǒng Lòng and K'cha Lòng rivers
- Nìtŭ is north of there, along the Hma Lòng river area, tributaries of Myithar river.
- Hlet lòng dialect spoken in the Hlet lòng river area, west of the Hmóng-K'cha area.
- K'hngì Yung is spoken along southern bank of the K'hngì Güng stream

The languages most closely related to Kʼchò are Kaang and Daai (So-Hartmann 1988:102).

== Linguistic studies ==
The initial description of the language is in a privately published manuscript by the Catholic missionary:

- Marc Jordan (1969), Chin Dictionary and Grammar. Privately Published.

It was based upon years of life and work among the people, and included around 7,000 words, and an initial grammar description based on European models. The dialect described there is what Mang calls Hmǒng-k'cha and has several thousand vocabulary items and a sizeable grammar description.

Here are some of the works on the language since then:

- F. K. Lehman, 1963, wrote an anthropological work on Chin society, which includes some information about what appears to be the Nìtŭ dialect.
- Kee Shein Mang and Stephen Nolan (2010) published a three way (English-Burmese-Kʼchò) dictionary of over 4,500 words of the Hmǒng-k'cha dialect as well. It was designed to be used in conjunction with the Kʼchò-English Jordan dictionary. It includes the semantic categories included, tone on all items, and all stem II (and III) of verbs discovered to date.
- Kee Shein Mang (2006) wrote a Masters thesis describing the stem alternation seen in the Hmǒng-k'cha dialect of Kʼchò.
- Ng'Thang Ngai Om. (2000) wrote a history of the Kʼchò spelling system.

Other papers include a large number written by George Bedell (grammar description, analysis, comparative work) and some by Stephen Nolan (dictionary, tone system description). See below for details.

== Translations ==
The Bible is available in several translations: The New Testament was translated by Sayar Ng'Thang Ngai Om in the Nìtŭ dialect (print and Bible app)

- The Bible Society of Myanmar. 1999. Caciim K'thai. Cho (Chin) New Testament. The Bible Society of Myanmar (Translated by Ng'Thang Ngai Om).

The Catholic K'cho Old and New Testaments were translated by Sayar John Ng'Ling Ghùng and are in Hmong-K'cha dialect.

- Ghùng, John Ng'lìng. 1994. Old Testament Translation. Manuscript. Privately Published. Mindat.
- K'khaanpùghĭ àh K'chü K'thài (The New Word of God). 2002 Catholic Translation of the New Testament.

== Bibliography ==
=== Larger works ===
- Jordan, Marc. 1969 Chin Dictionary and Grammar. Privately Published.
- Lehman, F. K. 1963. The Structure of Chin Society. A Tribal People of Burma Adapted to a Non-Western Civilization. University of Illinois Press.
  - Ng'Thang Ngai Om. 2000. The History of Kʼchò Spelling. Privately Published.
- Mang, Shein Mang. 2006. A syntactic and pragmatic description of verb stem alternation in K’cho, a Chin language . Master’s thesis, Payap University.
- Mang, Kee Shein and Stephen Nolan. 2010. English/Myanmar/K'cho Dictionary. Zinyatana Publishers. Yangon.

=== Detailed language analyses ===
- Nolan, Stephen 2000. An Initial Description of Tone in ‘Cho. Proceedings of the 33rdInternational Conference of Sino-Tibetan Language and Linguistics, Ramkhamhaeng University, Thailand, pp. 69-77.
- Bedell, George. 2001. Switch Reference in Kʼchò. Presented to the workshop on Tibeto-Burman Linguistics. UC Santa Barbara. University.
- Bedell, George and Kee Shein Mang. 2001. Oct. "Interclausal Ergativity" in Kʼchò. Unpublished notes stimulated by Peterson and Van Bik presented to the UC Santa Barbara Tibeto-Burman Workshop in July, 2001.
- Bedell, George. 2002a. Agreement in Kʼchò. Presented to the 33rd ICSTLL. Bangkok: Ramkhamhaeng University.
- Bedell, George. 2002b. Scope in Kʼchò Questions. Presented to the 35th ICSTLL. Tempe: Arizona.
- Nolan, Stephen. 2002. Spelling and the Alphabet in Kʼchò. Asian Cultural Studies Volume 28:127-138. Tokyo. Japan.
- Nolan, Stephen. 2003 Verbal Alternation in Kʼchò: A Phonological Outline of Verb Stems. Presented at the 36th International Conference of Sino-Tibetan Language and Linguistics. La Trobe University. Australia.
- Nolan, Stephen and Kee Shein Mang 2003a.12 Kʼchò Verb List with Stem I and II Derivations. Unpublished List.
- Nolan, Stephen and Kee Shein Mang 2003b. Tonal diacritics, vowel length, stem II verbal forms and extended definitions added to 199 pages of the 1969 Jordan, Marc M.E.C. Chin Dictionary and Grammar, Mindat, Chin State, Myanmar. Unpublished copy.
- Nolan, Stephen. 2006. High/Low Dissimilation in Kʼchò. Delivered to students at Payap University, Chiangmai, Thailand. Unpublished paper.
- Bedell, George. 2008. Agreement in K'cho. Journal of Language and Culture. Vol. 27. No. 2, Payap University.
- Mang, Kee Shein and George Bedell. 2008. Relative Clauses in Kʼchò. Paul Sidwell & Uri Tamor, eds. SEALSXVI: papers from the 16th meeting of the Southeast Asian Linguistics Society. Canberra, Pacific Linguistics, 2008, pp 21-34
- Bedell, George and Kee Shein Mang. 2009, Benefactives in K’cho. North East Indian Linguistics. Volume 2. Eds Stephen Morey, Mark Post. Pp 241-256
- Mang, Kee Shein and Stephen Nolan. 2010. Kʼchò Educational Poster (Animals, Birds, Reptiles, Fish, Insects, Worms) (Yangon). Private Publication.
- Mang, Kee Shein and George Bedell, 2012. The Applicative Suffix –na in Kʼchò. Language in India. Volume 12:1 January pp 51 - 69
- Bedell, George, Kee Shein Mang, Roland Siang Nawl, and Khawlsonkim Suantak. 2013. The Morphosyntax of Verb Stem. Alternation. Presented at the 46th International Conference on Sino-Tibetan Languages and Linguistics. Dartmouth College. USA
- Nolan, Stephen 2021. Tone and Pitch Lowering Behaviour in K'cho. A paper presented at the Australian Linguistics Society. La Trobe University.
- So-Hartmann, Helga 2009. A Descriptive Grammar of Daai Chin. STEDT Monograph 7. University of California, Berkeley.
