= Khumi language =

Kuki-Chin language spoken in Bangladesh and Burma

Khumi
- Khumi Chin
- Native to: Myanmar, Bangladesh
- Ethnicity: Khumi people
- Native speakers: 70,000 (2006–2009)
- Language family: Sino-Tibetan: Tibeto-Burman; Central Tibeto-Burman (?); Kuki-Chin-Naga; Kuki-Chin; Khomic; Khumi

Language codes
- ISO 639-3: Either: cnk – Khumi cek – Eastern Khumi
- Glottolog: khum1248 Khumi proper east2779 Eastern Khumi Chin

Khumi, or Khumi Chin, is a Kuki-Chin language of Myanmar, with some speakers across the border in Bangladesh. Khumi shares 75%–87% lexical similarity with Eastern Khumi, and 78-81% similarity with Mro-Khimi. A written script for Khumi was created between 1930–1949 by E.W. Francis.

== Geographical distribution ==
Khumi proper is spoken in the following townships of Myanmar (Ethnologue).

- Kaladan river area in Paletwa township, Chin State
- A few villages in Kyauktaw township, Rakhine State.

Eastern Khumi (Khami) is spoken in the following townships of Myanmar (Ethnologue). The Eastern Khumi dialects have a high degree of mutual intelligibility, with all dialects sharing at least 74% lexical similarity, although there are strong attitudes against sharing the same literature. In terms of lexical similarity, Nisay, Nideun, and Khongtu dialects share 92%–97% while the Khenlak and Asang dialects also share 92%–97%. The Likhy variety of Eastern Khumi shares 86%–90% lexical similarity with Mro-Khimi Chin.

- Matupi township, Chin State (in 4 villages)
- Sami subtownship, Paletwa township, Chin State (in 85 villages)

== Dialects ==
Ethnologue lists the following dialects.

- Khumi
  - Pi Chaung
  - Kaladan
  - Eastern Kaladan
  - Southern Paletwa
- Eastern Khumi (Khami)
  - Nisay (Nise, Palyng, Tao Cha)
  - Nideun (Amlai, Ghu, Laungtha, Maru, Paru, Tahaensae, Taheunso, Uiphaw)
  - Lemi (Akelong, Aki Along, Kaja, Kajauk)
  - Khongtu
  - Likhy (Likhaeng)
  - Rengcaa (Namboi, Nangbwe)
  - Khenlak
  - Asang (Kasang, Sangtha)

The Kasang (also known as Khenlak, Ta-aw, Hkongsa-Asang, Hkongso-Asang, Asang, and Sangta) consider themselves as ethnic Hkongso, but their language is intelligible with Khumi rather than Anu or Hkongso (Wright 2009). Kasang villages include Lamoitong and Tuirong.
