= Mro-Khimi language =

Sino-Tibetan language spoken in Myanmar

Mro-Khimi
- Mro, Khimi
- Native to: Burma
- Ethnicity: Mro-Khimi people (Mro Chin)
- Native speakers: 75,000 (2012)
- Language family: Sino-Tibetan: (Tibeto-Burman); Kuki-Chin; Khomic; Mro-Khimi

Language codes
- ISO 639-3: cmr
- Glottolog: mroc1235

Mro-Khimi (also Mro, Khimi, Mro Chin, Mro-Khimi Chin) is a Kuki-Chin language of Burma spoken by the Mro-Khimi people. The Mro-Khimi varieties share 91% to 98% lexical similarity. Mro-Khimi is 86%–90% lexically similar to the Likhy variety of Eastern Khumi, 81%–85% with Lemi variety of Eastern Khumi, and 77%–81% with Kaladan Khumi.

== Geographical distribution ==
Mro-Khimi is spoken in the following townships of Myanmar (Ethnologue).

- Chin State: Paletwa township
- Rakhine State: Kyauktaw, Buthidaung, Ponnagyun, Pauktaw, Mrauk U, and Maungdaw townships.

== Dialects ==
There are 4 main dialects of Mro-Khimi (Ethnologue).

- Arang (Ahraing Khami, Areung, Aroeng)
- Xengna (Hrengna)
- Xata
- Vakung (Wakun, Wakung)

Wakun (Vakung) is the most widely spoken and understood dialect (Horney 2009:5). Horney (2009:5) also lists Aryn, Dau, Khuitupui, Likhy, Pamnau, Tuiron, Xautau, and Xienau as dialects of khami. Horney (2009) describes phonologies of the Wakun and Xautau dialects.
