= Kanpetlet Township =

Coordinates: 21.2000°N 94.0167°E

Kanpetlet Township ကန်ပက်လက်မြို့နယ်)
- Township
- Location in Mindat district (in red)
- Country: Burma
- State: Chin State
- District: Mindat District
- Time zone: UTC+6:30 (MST)

Kanpetlet Township (Burmese: ကန်ပက်လက်မြို့နယ်) is a township of Mindat District in the Chin State of Myanmar. Its principal town is Kanpetlet.

There are 26 village-tracts and 117 villages in the township; only about 13 villages have access to motor roads and the population of the remaining over 100 villages had to travel on foot from one place to another in 2011.

According to the 2014 Myanmar census, Kanpetlet Township had a population of 21,493. It is one of the most isolated townships in Chin State.
