= Mindat Township =

Mindat Township မင်းတပ်မြို့နယ်
- Township
- Location in Mindat district (in red)

- Location within Myanmar
- Coordinates: 21°20′N 93°15′E
- Country (de jure): Myanmar
- State: Chin State
- District: Mindat District
- Admin. seat: Mindat
- Country (de facto): Chinland

Population (2008)
  - Township: 46,008
  - Urban: 10,932
  - Metro: 35,076
- Time zone: UTC+6:30 (MST)

Mindat Township (Burmese: မင်းတပ်မြို့နယ်) is a township located in Mindat District in the Chin State of Myanmar. The township is located between latitude 21.19 and 21.47, longitude 93.23 and 94.29. The third highest peak in Myanmar, Khonu Mountain (Mt. Victoria which was named after Queen Victoria of British) at 3,053 metres (10,016 ft), is visible from here, though it is within the Kanpetlet township boundary. Mindat was a part of Pakokku Hill Tracts District.

The "K'cho" or "Cho" people are the main ethnic group in the township. The K'cho people speak the K'cho language, distinct from the surrounding Chin dialects. K'cho ethnic groups in the township are the Mün, the M'Kang and the Dai.

Buddhism and Christianity is the main religions in Mindat. Many residents practice Buddhism due to its proximity to the Yaw region, where it is the main religion.

Mindat is divided into five blocks: Asheih, Bawathit, Sanpya, Anok and Sicheh. SanPya occupies the central area of town where most shops and businesses are located.

== Communities ==
Mindat is the major and only town; it is located in the southeastern part of the township. The township has 46 village tracts and 497 villages.

== History ==
By 1947, the construction of the Union of Burma, Pakokku Province, was established with two districts in 1948. They are Pakokku District and Kanpetlet District (Pakokku Hill Tacts) with 11 townships. Townships are Pakokku, Mindat, Yesagyo, Pauk, Seikphyu, Myaing, Gangaw, Htilin, Saw, Kanpetlet and Matupi. The capital city is Pakokku. In 1958, the name of Kanpetlet District was changed to Mindat District and Kanpetlet District's capital was moved to Mindat from Kanpetlet.

On 2 March 1962, the military led by General Ne Win took control of Burma through a coup d'état, and the government has been under direct or indirect control by the military. A new constitution of the Socialist Republic of the Union of Burma was adopted in 1974.

By 1974 construction, Pakokku province was abolished, and Pakokku District was added to the Magway Division and Mindat District was added to the Chin State until now.

== Religion ==
Religion in Mindat (2014)
1. Christianity (52.3%)
2. Buddhism (47.0%)
3. Atheist (0.65%)

There are various religions in the town. Missionaries walk or motorbike to outlying villages to convert people.

=== Catholic ===
There is a Catholic church, which maintains a nursery school and living quarters for the elderly.

=== Buddhism ===
There are three Buddhist monasteries: one in the Western Quarter, another in the Sanpya Quarter and the last one in the Eastern Quarter.
