= Chin people =

Pan-ethnic group native to western Myanmar

Chin peoples
- Burmese: ချင်းလူမျိုး
- Mara: Chin phopi
- Tedim Chin: Chin nam
- Hakha Chin: Chin miphun
- Falam Chin: Chin phunpi
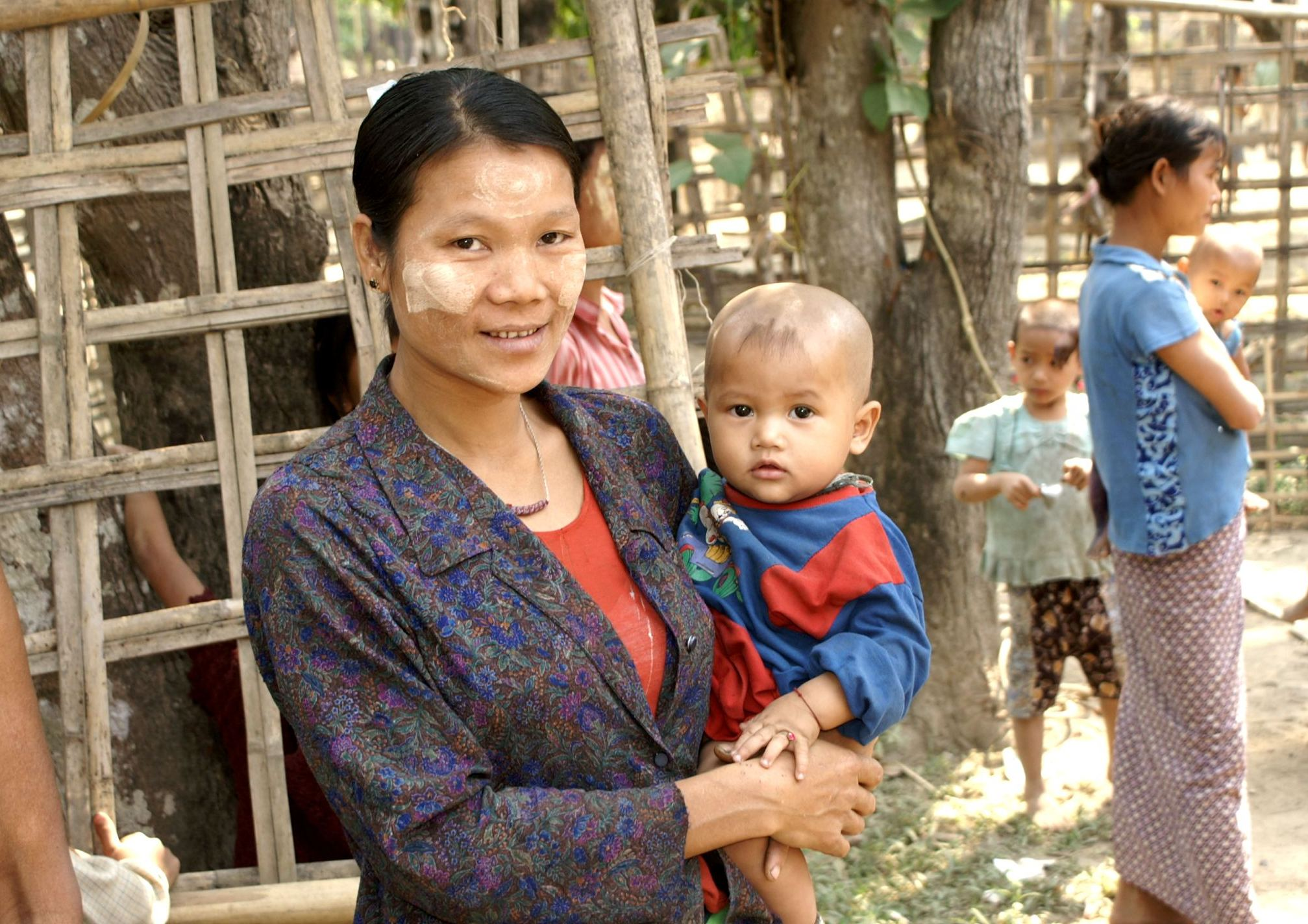
- Chin women and children

Total population
- c. 1.2 million

Regions with significant populations
- Myanmar: c. 1,000,000
- India: 100,000+
- Mizoram: 70,000–100,000 (2012)
- Manipur: 12,000
- United States: 70,000
- Malaysia: 27,250 (2024)
- Australia: 8,407 (2021)
- New Zealand: 1,110 (2023)

Languages
- Lingua franca: Burmese or Native: other Kuki-Chin languages

Religion
- Majority: Christianity 90% Minority: 10% Buddhism, traditional religion

Related ethnic groups
- Mizo; Naga; Kuki-Zo

The Chin peoples (Burmese: ချင်းလူမျိုး, MLCTS: hkyang: lu. myui:, pronounced [tɕɪ́ɰ̃ lù mjó]) are a collection of Tibeto-Burman ethnic groups native to western Myanmar (Burma). The Chin primarily live in the mountains of Chin State but are also found in parts of Sagaing Region, Magway Region, and Lower Myanmar. Significant Chin diaspora communities are also present in northeast India, the United States, Malaysia, and Australia.

The Chin are divided into numerous tribes and speak a variety of Kuki-Chin languages that are closely related but often mutually unintelligible. The Chin identity, as a pan-ethnic identity, is a modern construction, shaped by British rule and post-independence ethnic politics, built upon older tribal and regional identities.

== Ethnonyms ==
Chin (ချင်း, MLCTS: khyang:) is a pseudo-exonym, a Burmese language adaptation of the Asho Chin word khlong or khlaung, which means "man" or "person". Burmese speakers approximated the Asho Chin word and began to apply the exonym to all nearby groups residing in the Arakan Mountains and Chin Hills. The Burmese term first appeared in stone inscriptions dating to the reign of King Kyansittha in the 11th century.

The term "Chin" is not universally accepted by all groups living in Chin State nor by all Kuki-Chin-speaking groups. Groups in the north tend to prefer the term "Zo", while related ethnolinguistic groups in India prefer the terms "Zomi" or "Mizo".

During the era of British rule, the colonial government used the compound term "Chin-Kuki-Mizo" to group the Kuki-Chin language speaking peoples, and the Indian government inherited this nomenclature. The Burmese government classifies the Chin as a "national race" composed of 53 sub-groups that predominantly live in Chin State.

== Subgroups ==
The Chin peoples are divided into five main tribes, namely the Asho, Daai, Khami (Mro), Laimi, and Zomi, (Note: This classification is not definitive) which can be further distinguished by at least 60 different sub-tribal categories. According to anthropologist F. K. Lehman, the Chin people can be divided into two broad categories under geography and culture: the Northern Chin (Note: Also known as the "hill Chin") and Southern Chin. The division between the Northern and Southern Chin is demarcated at 21°45'N.

The Northern Chin can be divided into three tracts: Tedim, Falam and Hakha. The Tedim tract consists of the Sukte, Kamhau and Sizang. These can be further subdivided into subtribes such as the Dim, Khuano, Hualngo, Sizang, Tedim, Saizang, Thadou, Teizang, Vangte, Guite, Vaiphei, and Zou, most of whom collectively identify as Zomi.

The Falam tract is the most thickly populated, with the tribes: Sunthla, Zahau, Hualngo, Khualsim, Tawyan, Zanniat, Ngawn, Laizo, and Khuangli, who are known as Pawi or Sunthla. Historically, the British recorded them as "Tashon", an anglicized form of Taisun or Klashun, a village located west of Falam.

In the Hakha tract, the main tribes include the Hakha, Thantlang, Zokhua, Thetta, and Kapi. They call themselves Laimi and share similarities with the Mara. Historically, the Northern Chin were headhunters.

The Southern Chin largely consist of the plains or valley Chin. The Southern Chin are composed of the Chinme, Welaung, Chinbok, Yindu, Chinbon, Letu, Khyang, Sho, Asho, Cho, Khami, Mro and some Burmese tribes such as the Anu, Kun, Pallaing, and Sak. Their cultural practices differ, such as cremation of the dead and face tattoos.

== Geographic distribution ==
=== In Myanmar ===
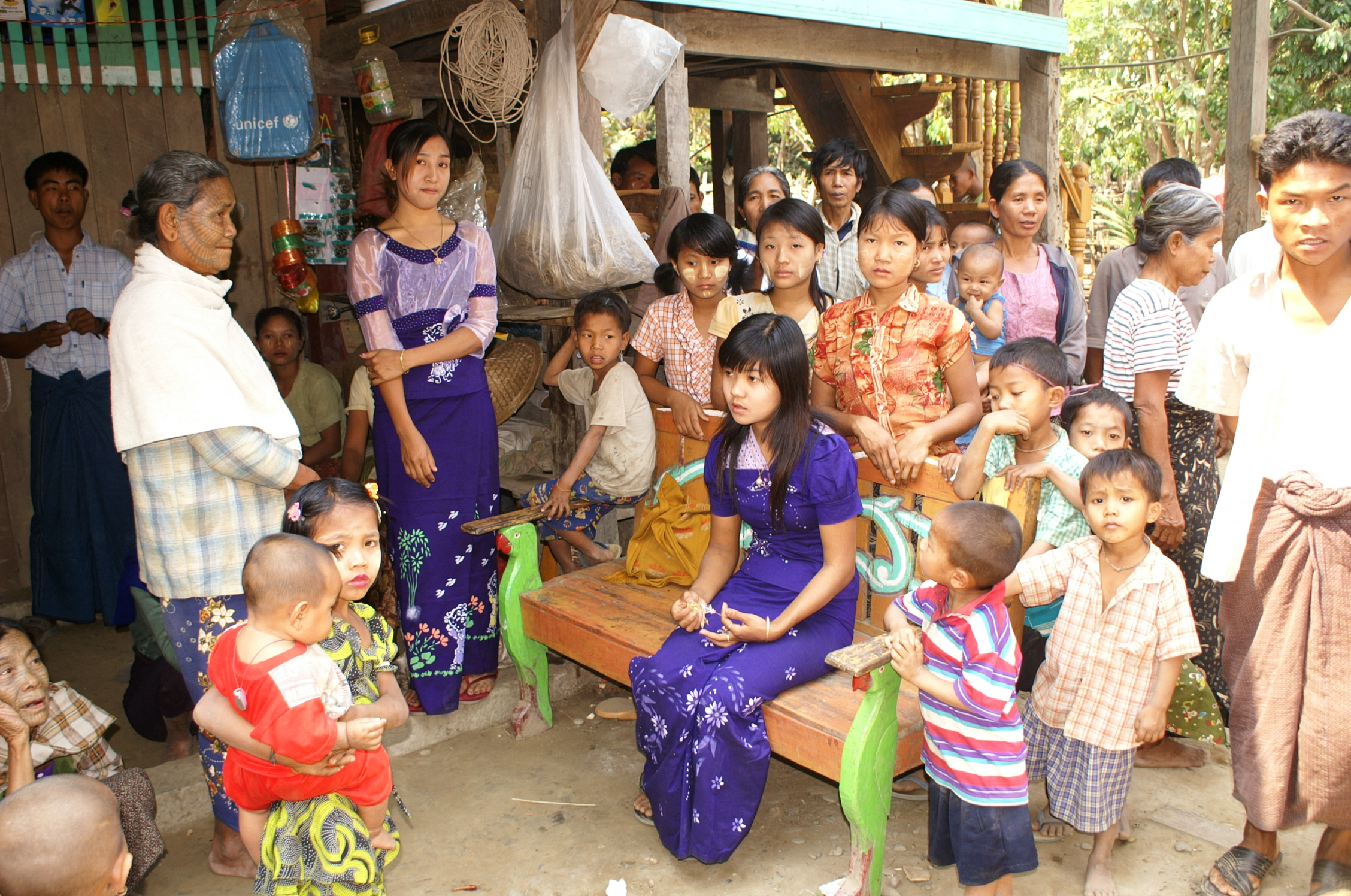
Chin community in Chin State, Myanmar

The Chin peoples predominantly live in the western part of Myanmar in Chin State and Rakhine State. Some Chin also inhabit Sagaing, Magway, Bago, and Ayeyarwady Regions. Chin settlements are usually above 1,000 metres (3,300 ft) in elevation. Major cities such as Yangon and Mandalay are also home to sizable Chin communities.

=== In India ===
An estimated 60,000–100,000 Chin refugees live in India, primarily in Mizoram. Due to restrictions on freedom of movement imposed by the State Peace and Development Council (SPDC), many fled Myanmar without documents to seek refuge across the border. Since the 2021 Myanmar coup d'état and resulting civil war, around forty thousand Chin people have fled to India. Chin people in India live without legal status, making them vulnerable to arrest, detention, and exploitation. They face challenges accessing livelihoods, healthcare, and shelter, often living on the margins of society. Mizoram has facilitated the integration of Chin refugees into local communities, including enrolling children in schools.

=== Diaspora ===
Due to political instability and poverty in Myanmar, many Chin have migrated to Bangladesh, India, Thailand, Malaysia, Canada, Australia, and the United States as refugees. As of August 2024, 27,250 Chin people were registered with UNHCR in Malaysia. Indiana has the largest Chin population in the United States, with around 32,000 in the Indianapolis area alone. Tulsa, Oklahoma is home to approx. 7,000–9,000 Zomi people, and is referred to as "Zomi Town".

Chin people who flee from Myanmar usually seek refuge in Thailand, Malaysia, or India before eventually resettling in the United States. Leaving Myanmar is often expensive, dangerous, and illegal. Refugees with limited financial means flee by boat, car, or on foot, whereas those with greater resources may travel by air. Human smugglers, or brokers, typically charge around US$1,000 per person to cross borders. Refugees caught by either Myanmar or foreign authorities may face imprisonment and mistreatment, including physical abuse.

In refugee camps, particularly those in Thailand, families are advised that having children could improve their prospects for resettlement in the United States. Consequently, many young Chin parents arrive in the U.S. needing immediate employment in order to support their families.

== History ==
=== Origins ===
The Chin maintain an origin known as Chinlung. (Note: Also called Sinlung or Khul) Due to the nature of oral history, it is difficult to locate Chinlung, and several theories have been proposed. Zawla, a Mizo historian, argues that the Chin departed from Chinlung during the reign of Qin Shi Huang (modern-day China). Historians Sing Khaw Khai and Chawn Kio both argue that the Chin are descendants of the historical Tibeto-Burman Qiang people. Based on this account, the Chin originated in the Gansu-Tibet frontier.

The Tibeto-Burman peoples are said to have migrated in three waves: first with the Chin-Kachin-Naga group, followed by the Burman and Lolo peoples. However, anthropologists like Edmund Leach challenge the link between Tibeto-Burman groups and ancient China. They argue that the people did not originate from cultural units known today and cannot be identified with any particular groups of today. F. K. Lehman contends that the ancestors of the Chin and Burmans were already distinct before migrating into Burma. He states that the Chin originated from western China and eastern Tibet towards the Hukong Valley, separate from that of Burmans.

=== Chindwin settlement ===
Burma scholar Gordon Luce suggested the Chin first settled in the Chindwin Valley (Note: Drainage basin area of the Chindwin River) around the mid-eighth century. However, he considered an earlier date, possibly as early as the fourth century. The Chindwin Valley was uninhabited until the Chin arrived. While the Burmans fought groups such as the Thet, Mon, and Pyu, they did not fight the Chin. Luce states that Pagan Burmans referred to the Chin as "friends". Luce postulates that the Chin did not join the enemies of the Burmans due to hostile relations. The migration of the Chin through the Hukong Valley split Thet tribes, leaving some in western Manipur. Burmans referred to the Chin as khyan and are inferred to have agreed to their occupation of the upper Chindwin.

=== Kale–Kabaw Valley ===
The Chin would eventually migrate from the eastern bank of the Chindwin into the Kale valley, around the late 13th century or the early 14th century. Evidence from Pagan-era records places the Chin between the eastern bank of the upper Chindwin and west of the Irrawaddy River. Zophei and Laimi folklore suggests floods drove them from the low valley into the mountains across the river, while scholars argue that the Chin moved after losing their alliance with Pagan.

After the fall of Pagan Kingdom, the Chin people lived peacefully in the Kale–Kabaw Valley for about a century and established their capital at Khampat. In 1395, the Shan founded Kale town on the border of the Chin Hills, bringing the Kale Valley under Shan control until British annexation. The rise of the Shan States weakened Chin influence in Upper Chindwin and central Burma. Zomi tribes note that a prince from the lowlands ruled Kale, during which the Chin people were forced to build fortifications and suffered severe oppression under Shan rule, while historians Sing Khaw Khai and Lal Thang Lian argue that the Chin and Shan peoples coexisted for a period.

=== Movement into the Chin Hills ===
After 1395, Chin people began leaving Kale and established new settlements in the Chin Hills, including the present township of Tedim. The first settlement in the Chin Hills was named Ciimnuai. (Note: Also called "Chin Nwe" or "Chin New") Chin people lived in Ciimnuai until splitting into different tribal groups due to political infighting, lack of land, and economic issues. The Asho people split away early and scattered around the Irrawaddy Delta, eventually going as far as the Chittagong Hill Tracts in Bangladesh, where they are known as "Khyang". One group split off to make a settlement in present-day Falam and formed the Laimi tribe. Tribes that moved north of Ciimnuai became known as Zomi. Historians posit that the Chins reached the northernmost extent of their settlement in present-day Manipur around 1554. Prior to Ciimnuai, there was no historical evidence of tribal differentiation between the Zo people.

The true reason why the Chins left Khampat and the Chindwin Valley is unknown. Historian D.G.E. Hall asserts that the Shans drove out the Chins from the valley into the Chin Hills. Lal Thang Lian, a Mizo historian, presents the oral story of the banyan sapling at the altar of the khua-hrum. According to the legend, the Chins planted the sapling before they were forced to abandon Khampat and pledged to return when the branches of the sapling grew to reach the ground.

=== Rise of the Sukte ===
Following the establishment of political agency in the Kingdom of Manipur, the treaty of 1834 transferred the Kabaw Valley to Burma, including the Shan sabwas (transl. lord of the heavens) of Kale and Sumjok to Burmese sovereignty. This coincided with the rise of the Sukte clan in the northern Chin Hills. Chief Khan Thuam was a powerful chief who became the target of a coalition of mang-kua (transl. nine-chiefs) against him. Khan Thuam fled to Falam and took shelter under the Chief of Rallang, Khuang Ceu, paying tribute. With his son Kam Hau, Khan Thuam soon overcame opposition with aid from Rallang. He returned to Mualbem and took revenge on the previous chiefs. His invasion of the Tedim tribes led to the migration of several tribes into neighbouring Manipur. Colonel William McCulloch described his observations of the scattered tribes in the Manipur Valley. The Guite and Zou tribes settled in the eastern Lushai Hills and the Manipur Valley. The Sukte absorbed the remaining tribes, while Khan Thuam levied customary taxes and dues from subordinate villages, thereby establishing the Sukte domain.

Siahtaang kaihna sak ciang teimei, ka hialna lamtui hi e.
Sak ciang teimei sang ciang lamtui, a lai ah kamkei hi'ing e.
English:
What I rule extends to Manipur in the North, and ends at Falam in the South.
Manipur to the North, Falam to the South, I am the tiger in the middle.

— Sing Khaw Khai, Zo People and Their Culture (1995)

Khan Thuam died in 1848 and was succeeded by his youngest son, Za Pau. However, his eldest son, Kam Hau, was more capable and established the village of Tedim. While Kam Hau lost Tedim to the Zou and Thadou, he regained it years later. Tedim grew and attracted many warriors, becoming one of the largest settlements and a seat of power in the Chin Hills. Sukte tradition states that when Khan Thuam was taking refuge in Falam, Kam Hau, who was with him, mastered the use of the gun by shooting a wild mithun that no one else dared to hunt. Kam Hau's rule extended from the region east of the Manipur River to the Manipur Valley, encompassing 135 villages. His brother, Za Pau, controlled territory west of the Manipur River but had been eclipsed by Kam Hau's prowess.

Kam Hau spread his influence into the Kale-Kabaw valley by raiding the settlements. Reports have suggested that the Shan sabwas took revenge in 1850. The raids under Kam Hau were directed towards Yazagyo, which was a market for the Kamhau people. The power of the Sukte clan became a security concern in Manipur.

=== British rule ===
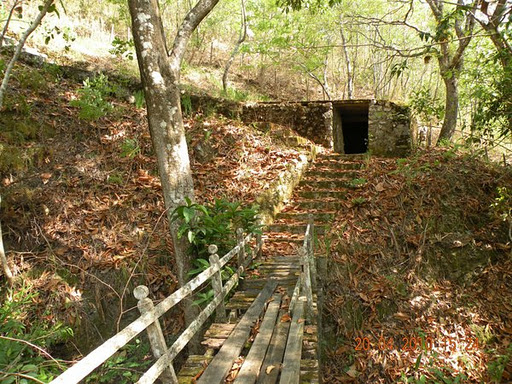
Nupi Kulh Fort, where women, children, and the elderly hid during the Battle of Siallum

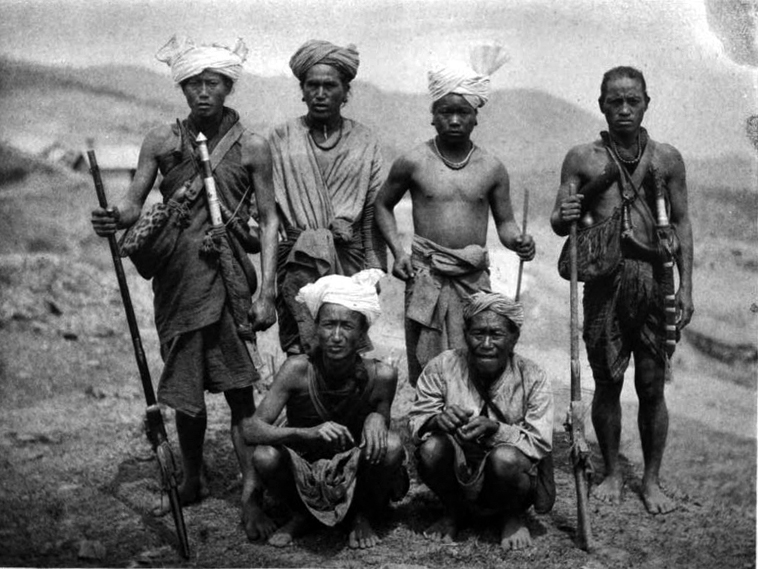
Sizang chiefs, 1900

Following the Third Anglo-Burmese War, the Chins were surrounded by the British Empire. A series of raids and hostilities in the Lushai Hills and the Chin Hills led to the Chin-Lushai Expedition. This expedition would annex both the Mizos and the Chins. From December 1888 to January 1889, 36 British people were killed, and 54 were wounded. The Chin-Lushai Expedition was launched with the goal of permanent occupation of the Lushai and Chin tribes. The British invaded from Burma, Assam and Chittagong. Chin resistance lasted longer than the British expected, and the terrain was becoming difficult to occupy. The British decided to conquer each tribe at a time. By 1892, the majority of the tribes were put into submission under the British. The Sizang, Sukte, Kamhau, and Thantlang of the Laimi opposed the British, while others refused to give up their slaves. In 1895–1896, after experiencing famine due to long-term warfare and British burning of local granaries and crops, the Chins surrendered.

The Chin Hills Regulation 1896 was applied. This legalised the classification of the name "Chin" across the various clans and tribes. The Chin Hills district was given a superintendent, the first one being B.S. Carey, as the chief executive of the administrative division. The British implemented an administrative policy of "indirect rule" and recognised the system of chieftainship known as khua-bawi. The democratic forms of chieftainship, such as in the Tlaisun tribe, were abolished and the ram-uk system of chieftainship was ignored until 1919.

In 1899, Superintendents Carey and Captain Drury invited the American Baptist missionary couple Reverend Arthur Carson and Laura Carson. Carey and Drury cited this policy as part of the pacification of the Chins. Additional missionaries arrived, totaling seven. In 1902, the first medical missionary, Dr East, arrived at Hakha with the assistance of the Carsons. The Chin Hills Baptist Association was established at Hakha in 1907. The missionaries established schools throughout the region, which they regarded as "the most effective instruments of evangelism".

==== Anglo-Chin War ====
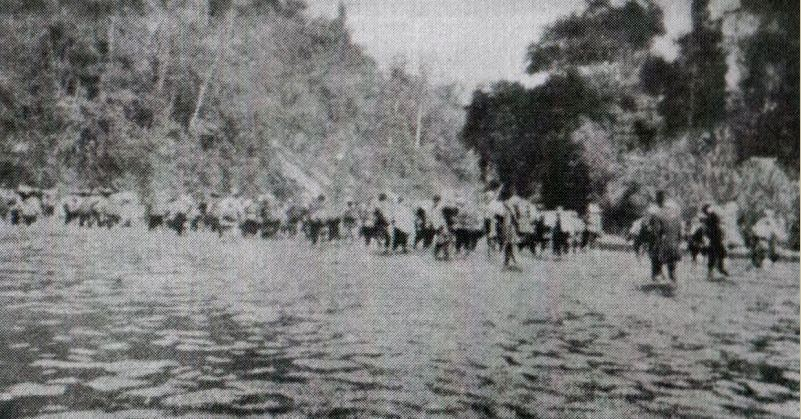
British-allied column crossing a river in the southern Chin Hills

In September 1890, the British persuaded eighteen Chin chiefs to visit Rangoon, where an outbreak of bubonic plague killed six of the Chin chiefs. The Chins believed they died because they had travelled beyond the sovereignty of Khua-hrum, which could no longer protect them. When the British tried to raise members for labour corps, fears arose that Khua-hrum would not be able to protect them in a far-away country such as France. With the outbreak of World War I, 1,000 men were recruited from Hakha, Falam, and Tedim in 1917. The Zomi joined the forces, but the Laimi in Hakha region refused the order, with 5,000 Laimi men making a sacred oath, known as Sathintuh, to wage war against the British. However, Christian convert Chia Khaw leaked the plans to the British. The Laimi were unable to overrun the British and their sepoys, who were well armed. The sepoys burnt down villages in the Senthang and Zophei areas, killed livestock, and destroyed crops and grain. The war lasted for two years, with a famine leading to a Chin surrender in 1919. The leaders of the rebellion were brought to trial, and 61 were sentenced. Two people who were sentenced to death committed suicide before they could be executed. The uprising led to a lack of shelter and food, leading to famine, disease, and a refugee crisis.

The Chin men who were deployed to Europe returned with more money than before; some learnt a trade, and most of them became professional soldiers after the war. Most of the men dropped their traditional belief that one could not travel outside of Khua-hrum and accepted Christianity. They began evangelizing the local Chin population, contributing to the growing acceptance of Christianity among the Chin.

==== Crown Colony of Burma ====
Following the Government of India Act 1935, the British established the Crown Colony of Burma. However, this government excluded the Chin, Shan, Kachin and Karenni people from gaining any representation in the political structure, as they had been conquered separately as independent countries. Furthermore, the demarcated borders of Burma and India divided the land of Zoram (transl. Zo land) between Lushai Hills district and the Chin Hills, the latter of which became part of the Frontier Areas; the Chittagong Hill Tracts remained a part of Bangladesh.

The demarcation also split Maraland of the Mara people and caused a confrontation between the Lakher Pioneer Mission (LPM), which was established in 1937, and the American Baptist Chin Mission (ABCM). The new boundaries made the LPM's operations in the Burmese territory unauthorised, and the ABCM accused them of "encroachment of preachers into territory not their own". The Deputy Commissioner, Mr Naylor, held a meeting regarding the dispute between the missionary groups on 24 May 1938. The LPM was thus shifted back into India, and the ABCM continued their work in the Chin Hills unopposed.

The Governor of Assam, Robert Neil Reid, opposed the new borders, and, in 1941, he put forward a proposal known as the Crown Colony of Eastern Agency Scheme. He proposed the formation of a separate colonial province called "Chin-Lushai", as he considered neither the Chin nor the Mizo as "Indian". The province, in the scheme, would have its own governorship and operate as a unit akin to Assam, Bengal and Burma. The proposal was supported by Winston Churchill and the UK Conservative Party; however, the advent of World War II prevented it from being implemented.

==== World War II ====
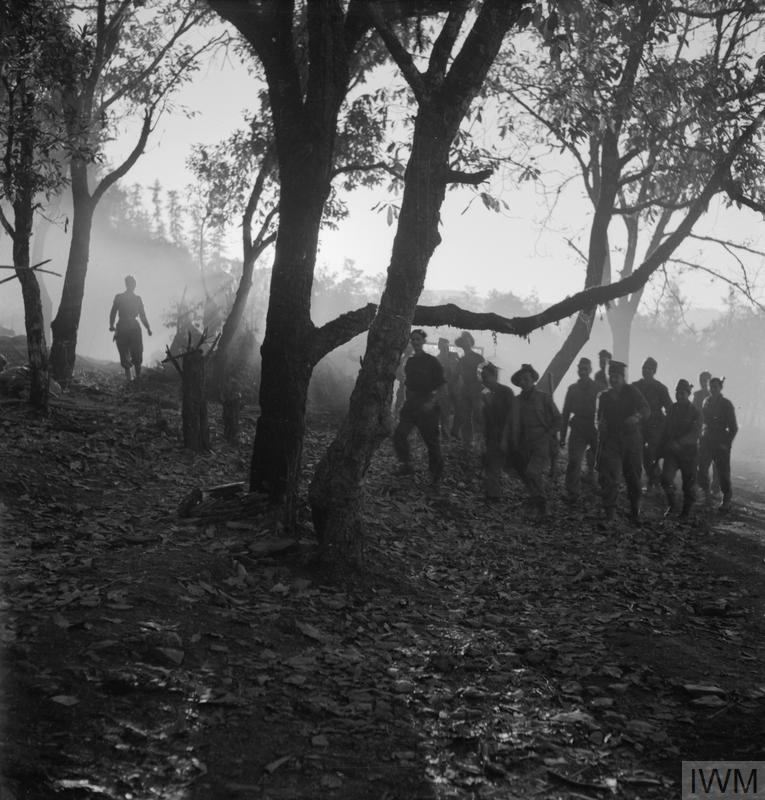
Soldiers gather for an evening meal in the Chin Hills, c. 1940s

During the Japanese occupation of Burma, Aung San and his "Thirty Comrades", receiving military training from the Imperial Japanese Army, established the Burma Independence Army in 1941. During the war, the British recruited non-Burmans, with the largest group being the Chin. (Note: 3,000 Chin; 2,000 Kachin; 2,000 Karen; 1,893 Burman) The Chin, along with the Kachin and Karen battalions, fought the Japanese army and resisted the Burma Independence Army.

In 1944, after the establishment of a puppet state under Ba Maw, the Japanese attempted to invade the Chin Hills. Aware of the atrocities committed by the Burma Independence Army and the Japanese, the Chin battalions retreated and entrenched themselves in the Chin Hills. The Chin Hills battalion and the Chin Levies succeeded in stopping the Burma Independence Army and the 33rd Japanese Army at the battle of Tedim. This delay was accredited as making the victory decisive at the Battle of Kohima and the Battle of Imphal. The Japanese, however, did manage to occupy the areas of Hahka, Falam and Tedim. The reclamation by British troops in 1944–1945 saw intense fighting and the widespread destruction of villages.

Since the Christian missionaries had left during the war, Northern Chins who had converted traveled to the southern Chin Hills to evangelize their kindred tribes.

==== Post-war era ====
After World War II, the Crown Colony plan, supported by Winston Churchill, was quashed with Clement Attlee's Labour Party entering into power. The plan was attempted to be revived by the Director of the Frontier Area Administration, H.N.C. Stevenson, to make a United Frontier Union. Burmese revolutionary Aung San cooperated with the British on the "White Paper", which outlined a long-term plan for the future of Burma. The British would rule for three years for economic recovery and then restore the Legislative Council of Ministerial Burma. After elections were held, a constitution would be drafted and enforced with dominion status. The White Paper considered the non-Burman areas, such as the Chin Hills, to be maintained via the pre-war status quo. Chin State, Kachin State, and the Federated Shan States would have, according to the White Paper, "a special regime under the Governor".

The Governor of Burma, Reginald Dorman-Smith, led civil servants who were against the Anti-Fascist People's Freedom League (AFPFL). They wished to declare the organisation illegal and to arrest Aung San. Attlee replaced Dorman-Smith with Major General Hubert Rance, and the White Paper was scrapped for direct negotiations with Aung San instead. The early post-war era highlighted the rights and interests of non-Burmans such as the Chins, but in 1946, under Rance, the British only considered the creation of a sovereign Burma without any deliberation or representation with the Frontier Areas.

On the other hand, the Frontier Areas that fought the Japanese expected lenient treatment for political matters in the future of independence. Unlike Indians and Burmans, the Chin, Kachin and Karen were willing to remain under British rule. Dorman-Smith sought to revive the Crown Colony Scheme of 1941, but British policymakers adapted it to a new idea. Under Reginald Coupland, they argued for a commonwealth of hill areas in both India and Burma consisting of:

- Chin Hills
- Lushai Hills
- Chittagong Hill Tracts
- Arakan Hill Tracts
- Pakkoku
- Naga Hills
- Manipur
- North Cachar and Mikir
- Sadiya Tracts
- Tripura
- Parts of Chindwin
- Kale

However, these did not come to fruition as the United Kingdom was too weak to impose new obligations and negotiations. Attlee vetoed the plan. Stevenson's plan of the United Frontier Union consisted of:

- Chin Hills
- Kachin State
- Federated Shan States
- Independent Karenni State
- Toungoo District
- Hill districts of Salween
- Tenasserim

This plan was opposed by the Burman nationalists, who saw Arakan and Mon as integral parts of Burma before British conquest. However, Stevenson had already held a meeting with the frontier area representatives in the Panglong Agreement, which had been accepted.

In negotiations with the British, the Burmese opposed Stevenson's United Frontier Union Scheme. The London Talks (constitutional discussions in London between British and Burmese representatives) excluded any representation of the hill people. On Burmese demands for a unified Burma, the British opposed the amalgamation, arguing that they were obligated to consider the wishes of the frontier people in recognition of their efforts in helping the British during World War II. The British were aware that the Frontier Areas opposed union with Burma.

Aung San thus cooperated, stating that the non-Burman people, including the Chin, had the right to freedom, independence, sovereignty, and self-determination as they had never been under Burmese rule. He signed the Aung San-Attlee Agreement on 27 January 1947, where the second Panglong Conference would be convened to discuss the future administration of the Frontier Areas. U Saw and Ba Sein refused to sign the agreement, arguing that the agreement would divide Burma. Aung San's actions led U Saw, Ba Maw, and Paw Tun to form the National Opposition Front, claiming that Aung San was collaborating with imperialists. Aung San, however, continued negotiations, and the Panglong Conference of February 1947 acknowledged that freedom would be achieved for the groups through cooperation with the Interim Burmese Government.

===== Panglong Agreement =====
Before the Panglong Conference, Chin chiefs, advisors, and representatives held a preliminary conference at Falam on 28 October 1946. They discussed whether the Chin Hills should remain under the British Governor or join dominion Burma. The Falam Conference passed resolutions to remain with the Governor and cooperate with the Shan and Kachin; they also chose chiefs to represent them at Panglong.

Aung San, the Chief Minister of the interim Burmese Government, arrived in Panglong on 8 February 1947 and persuaded the representatives to join independent Burma. He promised separate status with full autonomy within Burma, protection of minority rights, and the privilege of secession. He agreed to put the terms of the Panglong into law to guarantee the outcomes and to alleviate fears of backtracking.

The Chin chiefs stated that if they were to join Burma, it would be temporary before governing themselves as an independent territory. The representatives all demanded a right to secession from Burma at any time after independence. However, when Vum Kho Pau translated for the Lai chiefs, he mistranslated the word ram into "district" rather than "country" or "nation-state", leading to the belief that the Chin did not ask for separate status.

Aung San further granted the Chin Hills special administrative status in the constitution to maintain their old customary law. This led to the Chin Special Division being made instead of a state within the Union of Burma. The Panglong Agreement, signed by the Frontier Tribes, was not to join Burma but to hasten their right to secession and to gain independence. Aung San expressed to the opposition that the right of secession was granted so that by showing sincerity, the frontier areas could be made to stay. He fulfilled his promise to codify the Panglong resolutions and legalised them in the 1947 Union Constitution of Burma.

Despite the right to secession being codified, Burma did not become a true federal union. Aung San was assassinated by Burma's last pre-World War II Prime Minister, U Saw, on 19 July 1947 and succeeded by U Nu. U Nu redrafted the constitution despite it already being approved by the AFPFL in May 1947. The new constitution drafted by U Chan Htun was promulgated by the Interim Government's assembly.

The new constitution had a bicameral structure consisting of the Chamber of Deputies and the Chamber of Nationalities. The latter would allow unelected chiefs and leaders of the Chin, Shan and Kachin to retain their traditional powers. Eight parliamentary seats were reserved for the six major tribes of the Chin: the Asho, Cho, Khami, Laimi, Mizo and Zomi. The system was considered problematic. The Mizo were outside of Burma, the Asho were outside of the Chin Hills, and the remaining tribes had a democratic council and a hereditary chieftainship structure. The Cho and Khami tribes had no hereditary chieftainship system, thus lacking eligibility to have representatives.

=== Since Burmese independence in 1948 ===
On 20 February 1948, the Chins, who were dissatisfied with the Chin chiefs, held a popular vote to dismantle the system of chieftainship for the Chamber of Nationalities and the local administration. The new system held four seats for the Northern Chin of Hakha, Falam, Thantlang and Tedim and four seats for the Southern Chin of Matupi, Paletwa, Mindat and Kanpalet. The first celebration of the date, known as Chin National Day, took place on 20–22 February 1951, in Mindat.

In 1988, during the nationwide 8888 Uprising, the military cracked down on pro-democracy protests in Chin State, causing some residents to flee to India, where they formed the Chin National Front (CNF) and its armed wing, the Chin National Army (CNA). The CNA signed a ceasefire deal with the Myanmar military in 2012.

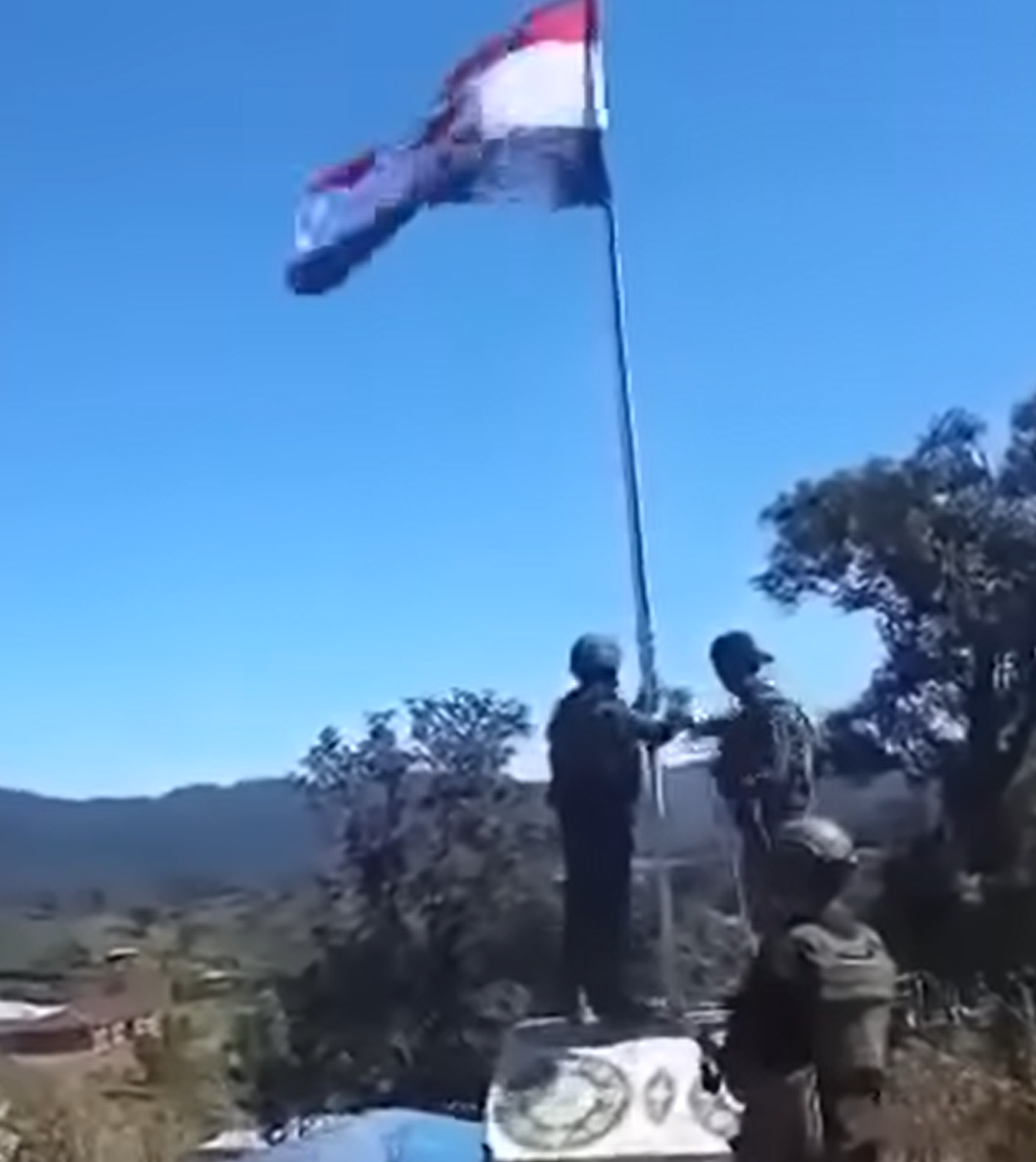
CNA soldiers raise flag on recaptured territory in Lialaipi, Chin State, 2023

Following the 2021 Myanmar coup d'état, Chin residents participated in anti-coup protests, and the CNA resumed fighting against the Burmese armed forces. Rival Chin insurgent groups, such as the CNA and the Chin Brotherhood, the latter of which is allied with the Arakan Army, have engaged in infighting. Thousands of Chin have fled to the Indian state of Mizoram. Despite the Indian government's directives, the Mizoram government has sheltered over 10,000 Chin refugees, citing ethnic and historical ties. Mizoram Chief Minister Zoramthanga stated to Prime Minister Narendra Modi:

Myanmar areas bordering Mizoram are inhabited by Chin communities who are ethnically our Mizo brethren... Mizoram cannot remain indifferent to its suffering today. India cannot turn a blind eye to this humanitarian crisis unfolding right in front of us in our own backyard.

This sentiment was echoed across Mizoram. The YMA built refugee camps and coordinated donations of food, clothing, and funds from across the state.

== Culture ==
=== Clothing ===
The Chin people wear wrap-around cloths (niik); women weave bright-patterned textiles with complex patterns using backstrap looms. The main colors used for traditional attire vary among Chin communities. Red and dark textiles are favored by the Lutuv and Hakha Chin, while the Mindat Chin prefer green and purple. Accessories include necklaces, earrings, and bangles. Magan Chin women wear large earrings made of beads and calabashes.

Traditionally, the Chin wear loincloths and men occasionally wear turbans. Both garments have two types: one for everyday use and one reserved for special occasions.

=== Cuisine ===
Chin cuisine is typified by abundant use of vegetables, and meat is typically boiled and served with vegetables. Rice, maize, and millet are common staple foods. The Chin brew a homemade alcohol made of fermented grain called zu; it plays a ritual role in Chin culture. Chin elders also consume nicotine juice called thibur, which is carried in small gourd containers.

=== Holidays ===
Chin National Day is celebrated annually on 20 February, commemorating the abolition of the traditional slavery system and chieftainship among the Chin people. During the event, beauty pageants, fashion shows, and musical performances are held. Traditional food, such as sabuti (hominy corn soup) and chang (rice cake) is served.

Chin Christians celebrate Easter and Christmas.

=== Sports ===
Wrestling is a part of the Chins' sporting traditions.

=== Tattoos ===
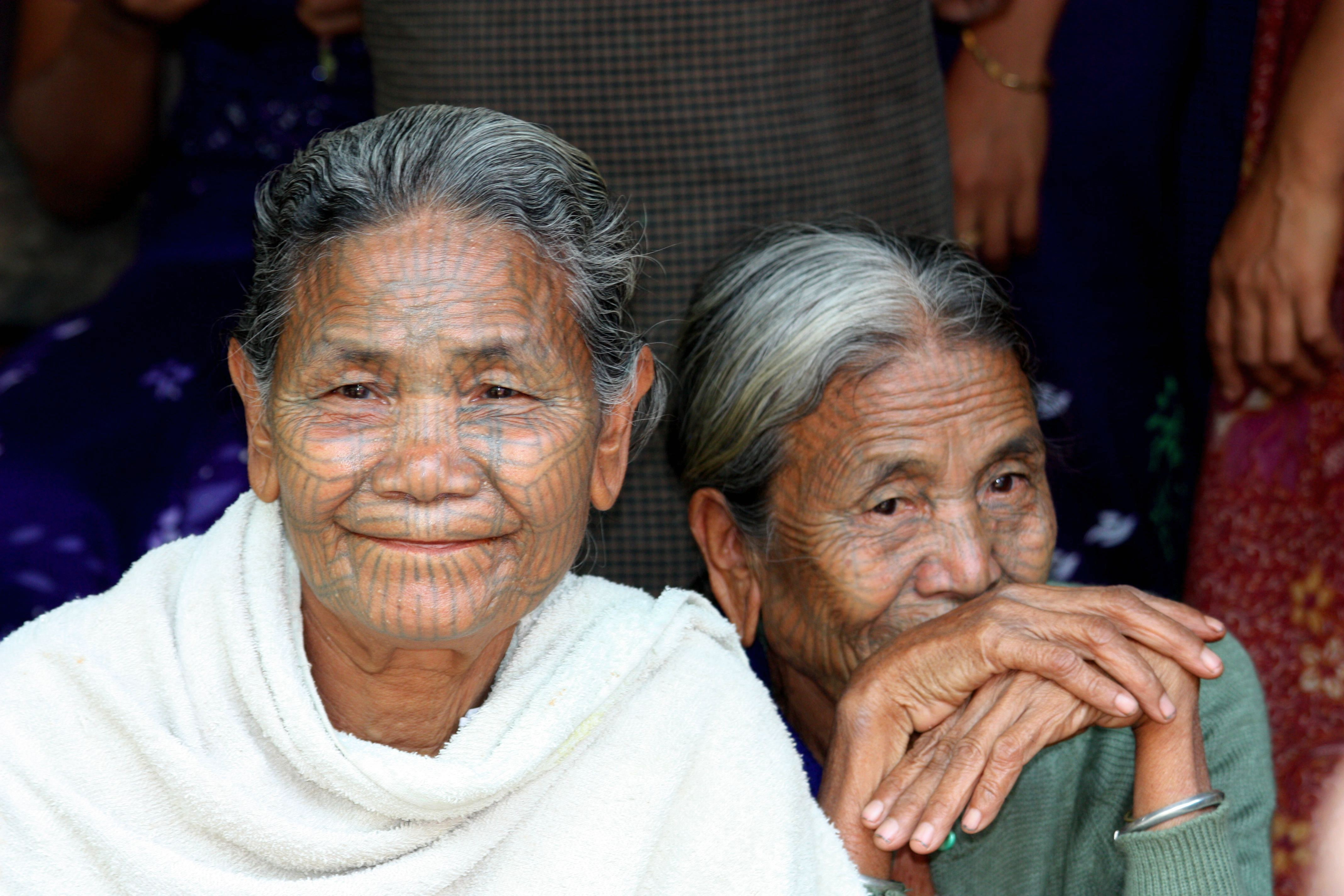
Chin women with face tattoos

South and central Chin tribes traditionally tattooed the faces of women, with designs varying by tribe. The M'kaan, Daai, and Yin Du women got tattooed across their entire faces, while N'men (Muun) and Matu women only certain parts of the face. The Uppriu tribe covers the entire face with dots, making their face appear blackened or ashen-looking. Ngagah tattoos are a mix of vertical lines and dots, and Daai women display dots that are mixed with vertical and horizontal lines on the forehead and cheeks. Mro women wear tattoos in the form of small marks or stars on the cheek, forehead, or breast, which they associate with fertility.

The practice, known as Ming, was banned in the 1960s by the Union Revolutionary Council and was discouraged by both Christian and Buddhist missionaries. Today, it is a vanishing tradition, with the remaining tattooed women being elderly. Women were typically tattooed between the ages of 15 and 20. According to folklore, a Burmese king travelled to the region and married a beautiful Chin woman, taking her to his palace. Unhappy there, she snuck away to return home and disguised herself by making incisions in her face. Because of this, Chin families began tattooing their daughters to ensure they would not be taken away. Other explanations suggest it was done for beauty or to distinguish members of different tribes in case one was kidnapped by another.

The tattoos are made by heating the bark of green pine trees and capturing the smoke in a mud pot. The soot is then mixed with a kind of bean leaves, and the resulting liquid is inserted under the skin using the thorn of a cane plant. The process takes around 2–4 days to complete.

== Languages ==
The Chin peoples speak a variety of related but often mutually unintelligible Kuki-Chin languages, which preserve many features of Proto-Tibeto-Burman phonology, including preservation of many initial and final consonants. Several Chin languages are facing extinction due to competing local and national languages, such as Lamtuk, which is being displaced by Hakha Chin and Burmese. Multilingualism is common among the Chin, who invariably speak their native language, a nearby local language, and the national language, Burmese.

In 2019, the Chin State government tentatively proposed prioritising five Chin languages—Zolai (for Tedim and Tonzang), Laizo (for Falam), Lai (for Hakha and Thantlang), Khumi (for Paletwa), and Kcho (for Mindat and Kanpalet)—to be taught as mother tongues at state schools.

Ethnologue lists 49 languages in this group, of which 20 contain the word "Chin" in their name. The following are widely spoken Chin languages:

- Tedim Chin, with an estimated 411,000 speakers
- Thadou Chin, with an estimated 346,100 speakers
- Hakha Chin, with an estimated 210,410 speakers
- Falam Chin, with an estimated 107,900 speakers
- Asho Chin, with an estimated 174,000 speakers
- Khumi Chin, with an estimated 64,000 speakers
- Mara Chin, with an estimated 62,400 speakers
- Zotung Chin, with an estimated 40,000 speakers
- Matu Chin, with an estimated 40,000 speakers
- Daai Chin, with an estimated 37,000 speakers

== Religion ==
Traditionally, the Chin peoples believe in numerous deities and spirits that inhabit natural phenomena. They worship a supreme god, Pathian, (Note: Pasian in northern Chin languages; Pathian in central Chin languages; also known as Khuazing or Khua-hrum) who is believed to have come from heaven and possesses the capability to control the universe. Gayals and pigs are commonly sacrificed during rituals. Expert hunters are believed to enjoy a high rank in the afterlife. Traditional Chin stories are similar to those of the Bible, such as Tower of Babel and world flood narratives. The Chin also practice forms of ancestor worship.

In the late 1800s, the first Christian missionaries arrived in Chin State and began converting the Chin to Christianity. They translated the Bible into local dialects and established schools for the Chin. Missionaries and Chin evangelicals successfully helped spread Christianity throughout the region and today, the majority of Chin are Christians, with most belonging to Protestant denominations, especially Baptist. Christianity grew from 35% in 1966 to 90% in 2010. Chin Christians have faced religious persecution from the military government in predominantly Buddhist Myanmar. Animal sacrifice continues to be practiced among some Chin Christians.

Several Chin tribes, including the Asho Chin, are majority Buddhist. Some Buddhist Kuki-Chin-speaking ethnic groups, like the Taungtha people in Magway Region, do not self-identify as Chin.

Since the late 20th century, a group of Chin, Kuki, and Mizo peoples have claimed descent from Manasseh, one of the Lost Tribes of Israel, and have adopted Judaism. They are known as the Bnei Menashe.

== Human rights violations ==
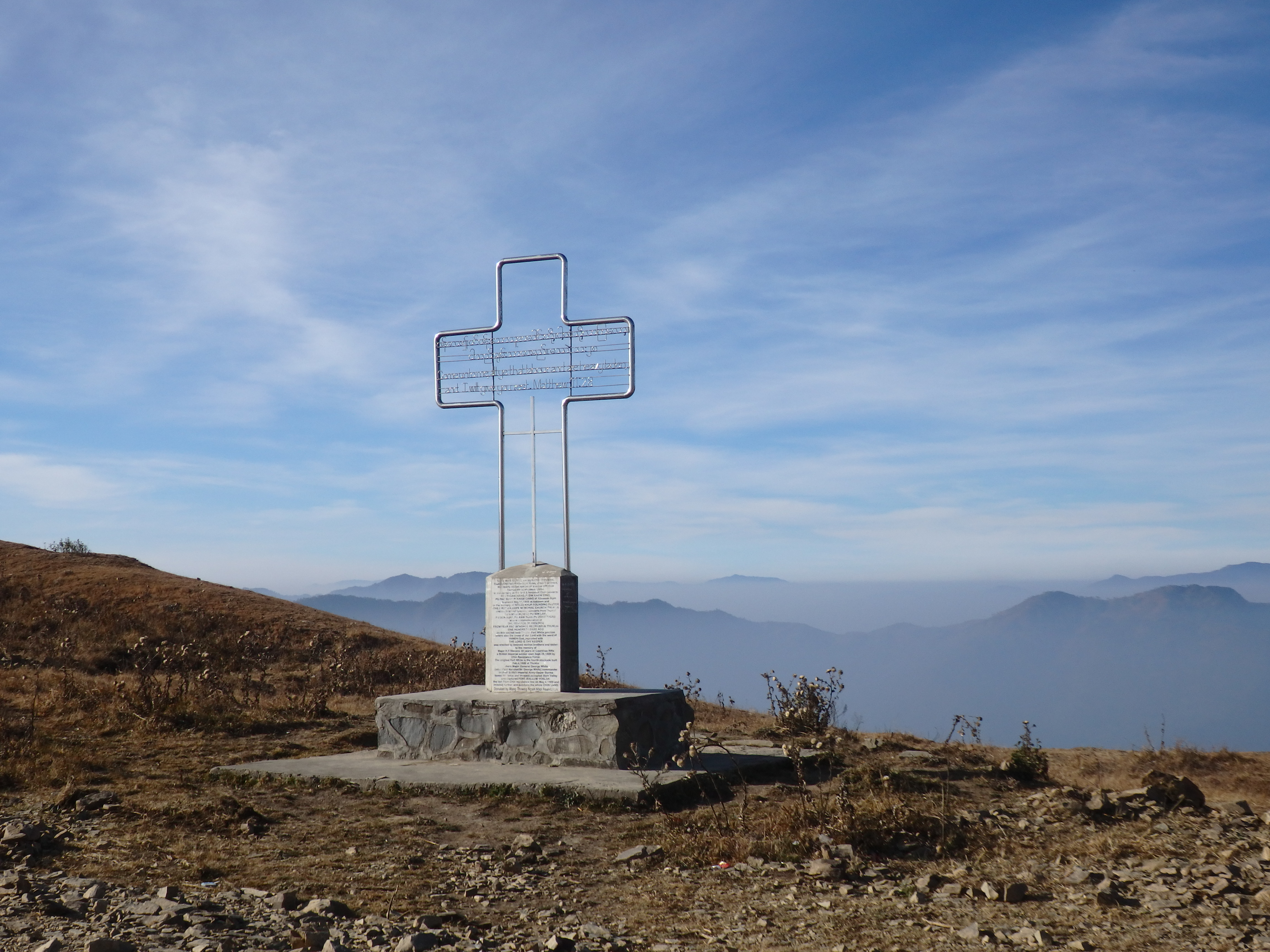
Chin Christians often set up crosses on local mountaintops; many have been destroyed by Myanmar authorities.

Since the 1962 military coup by Ne Win, the Chin—a mostly Christian minority in a predominantly Buddhist Myanmar—have faced systemic ethnic and religious persecution. The Tatmadaw and successive military juntas, including the State Peace and Development Council (SPDC), have committed widespread abuses, including forced labor, torture, arbitrary detention, extrajudicial killings, and forced assimilation. Soldiers under the SPDC were incentivized to marry and convert Chin Christian women. These conditions have driven many to flee to India, Thailand, and Malaysia, often without legal protection or refugee status.

=== Extrajudicial killings ===
Although Myanmar is not a party to the International Covenant on Civil and Political Rights, it is still bound by other international obligations that protect the right to life. Despite this, extrajudicial killings have been repeatedly reported in Chin State. Human Rights Watch and the Chin Human Rights Organization have documented killings, including children and women, for suspected opposition ties.

=== Forced labor ===
Despite Myanmar's ratification of the 1930 Forced Labour Convention, forced labor has been widely reported. Chin civilians are often forced to construct military buildings, carry supplies, or serve as porters under threat of violence. A 2011 study using household interviews found that 91.9% of Chin households surveyed experienced forced labor, and 78.4% were forced to build infrastructure. 14.8% of households reported beatings or torture.

== Notable Chin people ==
- Joshua Van, mixed martial artist; UFC Flyweight Champion (2025–present); second-youngest UFC champion in history
- Gokhothang, Guite prince from Mualpi, also known as Goukhothang, Go Khaw Thang, Go Khua Thang, or Kokutung (the latter being the name used by the historians Carey and Tuck). He is the only Zomi prince whom the neighboring Meitei (Manipur) kingdom ever acknowledged as Raja (or Ningthou in the Meitei language). His powerful dominion included over seventy cities, towns, and villages. He became known as the leader of all Zo people.
- Pau Cin Hau, Zomi prophet who founded Laipianism and created a script named Zo tuallai.
- Khai Kam Suantak, Chin leader who ruled over the largest fiefdom in the Chin Hills. Khai Kam College in Kalemyo was named in his honor, although it has since been renamed Kale College.
- Khan Thuam, Chin chief of the Sukte Clan who ruled over considerable territory and father of Chief Kam Hau.
- Zoramthanga, boxer who won a bronze medal at the 1990 Bombay Boxing World Cup.
- Taik Chun, soldier and recipient of Aung San Thuriya medal, the highest and most prestigious award for gallantry and bravery.
- Henry Van Thio, politician and vice-president of Burma.
- Cheery Zahau, human rights and women's rights activist, feminist, politician, writer, development and peace leader. She is the founder and leader of "Women's League of Chinland" and winner of UNDP's N-Peace Awards 2017.
- Thet Mon Myint, Myanmar Academy Award-winning actress
- Esther Dawt Chin Sung, singer and winner of Myanmar Idol season 4
- Benjamin Sum, singer and runner up of Myanmar Idol season 4

== See also ==
- Chin Student Association

== Sources ==
- Sakhong, Lian H. (2003). In Search of Chin Identity: A study in Religion, Politics and Ethnic Identity in Burma (PDF). Denmark: NIAS Press. ISBN 87-91114-15-2.
- Tohring, S. R. (2010). Violence and Identity in North-east India: Naga-Kuki Conflict. Mittal Publications. ISBN 9788183243445.
- Kenneth Van Bik (2021), "19 Typological profile of Kuki-Chin languages", The Languages and Linguistics of Mainland Southeast Asia, De Gruyter Mouton, pp. 350–378, doi:10.1515/9783110558142-019, ISBN 978-3-11-055814-2, S2CID 238716745
- Sing Khaw Khai (1995). Zo People and Their Cultureː a historical, cultural study and critical analysis of Zo and its ethnic tribes. Manipur: Khampu Hatzaw. LCCN 96905260.
- Michaud, Jean; Swain, Margaret Bryne; Barkataki-Ruscheweyh, Meenaxi (2016). Historical Dictionary of the Peoples of the Southeast Asian Massif. Rowman & Littlefield Publishers. ISBN 9781442272798.
- Alexander, Amy (2009). "We are Like Forgotten People". HRW.
- Callahan, Mary Patrica (2007). Political Authority in Burma's Ethnic Minority States. Institute of Southeast Asian Studies. ISBN 9789812304636.
- Pum Khan Pau (2018). "Reconfigured frontier: British policy towards the Chin-Lushai Hills, 1881-1898" (PDF). The NEHU Journal. XVI (1): 1–17.
- Henderson, John William (1968). Area Handbook for Burma. Vol. 550. University of Illinois at Urbana-Champaign.
- Cady, John Frank (1965). A History of Modern Burma. Cornell University Press.
- Temple, Richard Carnac (1896). Indian Antiquary. Vol. 25. Times of India.
- Gilbert, Lela (2007). Baroness Cox. Monarch Books. ISBN 9780825461644.
- Manchanda, Rita; Bose, Tapan K. (1997). States, Citizens and Outsiders: The Uprooted Peoples of South Asia. South Asia Forum for Human Rights.
- Yamahata, Chosein; Seekins, Donald M.; Takeda, Makiko (2021). Social Transformations in India, Myanmar, and Thailand. Vol. 1. Springer Nature Singapore. ISBN 9789811596162.
- Khen Suan Khai (2023). "A Threatened Identity in Chinland of Burma/Myanmar: A Glimpse of Freedom of Religion and Belief". In Takeda, Makiko; Yamahata, Chosein (eds.). Myanmar's Changing Political Landscape: Old and New Struggles. Singapore: Springer Nature. doi:10.1007/978-981-19-9357-2_5. ISBN 978-981-19-9357-2.
- John Tha Cung (2018). "Naming God in the Chin Language". Archived from the original on 6 April 2026.
- Yin, Saw Myat; Elias, Josie (2012). Myanmar. Marshall Cavendish Benchmark.
- Pum Khan Pau (2020). Indo-Burma Frontier and the Making of the Chin Hills. London: Routeledge. ISBN 978-0-429-32470-3.
- Strait, Chester U. (2014). The Chin People: A Selective History and Anthropology of the Chin People. ISBN 9781493163090.
- Johansen, Bruce E. (2003). Indigenous Peoples and Environmental Issues. Bloomsbury Academic. ISBN 9780313323980.
- Tong, Lei (2025). Ethnic Insurgency of Myanmar: Resilience and Fragility. Northern Illinois University (Doctor of Philosophy thesis). Illinois. ProQuest 3246076852.
- D. Kip Thian Pau (1999). Trials and Triumphs of the Chin Pioneers. Foundations of Grace Publishing.
- Rogers, Benedict (2012). Burma: A Nation At The Crossroads. Ebury Publishing. ISBN 9781448118656.
- Aung San Suu Kyi (1991). Freedom from Fear. Penguin Books. ISBN 9780140170894.
- Carey, Bertram Sausmarez; Tuck, Henry Newman (2022) [1st pub. 1896]. The Chin Hills. Vol. 1. ISBN 1015900615.
- Pum Za Mang (July 2016). "Buddhist Nationalism and Burmese Christianity". Studies in World Christianity. 22 (2). doi:10.3366/swc.2016.0147.
- Pau Sian Lian (2023). Federalism in Myanmar. Bloomsbury Publishing. ISBN 9781978781498.
- Sollom, R.; Richards, A. K.; Parmar, P.; Mullany, L. C.; Lian, S. B.; Iacopino, V.; Beyrer, C. (2011). "Health and Human Rights in Chin State, Western Burma: A Population-Based Assessment Using Multistaged Household Cluster Sampling". PLOS Medicine. 8 (2) e1001007. doi:10.1371/journal.pmed.1001007. PMC 3035608. PMID 21346799.
- Fraser, David W.; Fraser, Barbara G. (2005). Mantles of Merit: Chin Textiles from Myanmar, India and Bangladesh. River Books. ISBN 9789749863015.
- Journal of the Bihar and Orissa Research Society. Vol. 16. The Society. 1930.
- Young, Richard F. (2022). World Christianity and Interfaith Relations. Augsburg Fortress Publishers. ISBN 9781506448497.
- Ling, Tial C.; Inta, Angkhana; Armstrong, Kate E.; Little, Damon P.; Tiansawat, Pimonrat; Yang, Yong-Ping; Phokasem, Patcharin; Tuang, Za Khai; Sinpoo, Chainarong; Disayathanoowat, Terd (2022). "Traditional Knowledge of Textile Dyeing Plants: A Case Study in the Chin Ethnic Group of Western Myanmar". Diversity. 14 (12). MDPI. doi:10.3390/d14121065.
- Threats to Our Existence: Persecution of Ethnic Chin Christians in Burma (PDF). Chin Human Rights Organization. September 2012. ISBN 978-616-305-461-6. Archived (PDF) from the original on 4 March 2025.
- Mühlhaus, Karl-Hermann; Lee, Peter K. H. (2025). Christian Theology in Myanmar: In a Multi-religious, Predominantly Buddhist Environment and a Society Full of Tensions. Erlanger Verlag. ISBN 9783872146434.
- Haokip, Telsing Letkhosei (2018). Ethnicity and Insurgency in Myanmar /Burma. Educreation Publishing.
- Lowis, Cecil Champion (1908). Burma: The Minbu, Mandalay, Sagaing, and Meiktila divisions; and the Native States. Superintendent of Government Print.
- Zhitny, Vladislav Pavlovich; Iftekhar, Noama; Somblion, Elizabeth Viernes (2020). "History, Folklore, and Current Significance of Facial Tattooing". Dermatology. doi:10.1159/000505647.
- Hughes, W. Gwynne (1881). The Hill Tracts of Arakan. Government Press.
- Marshall, Paul A. (2008). Religious Freedom in the World. Bloomsbury Academic. ISBN 9780742562127.
- Vater, Tom (20 April 2024). "Photographer documents disappearing face tattoos of Myanmar's Chin women". Bangkok: Nikkei Asia.
- Bitrus, Ibrahim S.; Keijzer, Josh de; Everett, David L.; Fredrickson, David E.; Hansen, Guillermo; Hayes, Marie Y. (2023). Theology and Ethics for the Public Church. Lexington Books. ISBN 9781978713246.
- David Thang Moe (2024). Beyond the Academy: Lived Asian Public Theology of Religions. Pickwick Publications. ISBN 9798385218080.
- Burma/Myanmar Individual Submission to the UN Universal Periodic Review (PDF). Chin Human Rights Organization (Report). Nepean, Ontario. July 2010.
- "Disquiet on the Western Front: A Divided Resistance in Myanmar's Chin State". Crisis Group. 19 March 2025.
- Fink, Christina (2001). Living Silence: Burma Under Military Rule. Zed Books. ISBN 9789747534689.
- Amjad, Akhtarul Islam; Kalkreuter, Britta; Mukhopadhyay, Samrat (2025). Traditional Textiles of the Indian Subcontinent. Springer Nature Singapore. ISBN 9789819665303.
- Lian H Sakhong. "THE ORIGIN OF THE CHIN". Chin Human Rights Organization. Archived from the original on 1 March 2024.
- Haokip, Telsing Letkhosei (2015). "Ethnic Separatism: The Kuki-Chin Insurgency of Indo-Myanmar/Burma". South Asia Research. 31 (1): 21–41. doi:10.1177/0262728014560473.
- Khai, T. S. (25 October 2024). "India's refugee policy dilemma and its impact on Myanmar refugees at the India–Myanmar frontier". Discover Public Health. 21 (1). Springer Science and Business Media LLC. doi:10.1186/s12982-024-00295-7.
- Wilch, Matthew, Zo Tum Hmung (December 2011). Seeking Refuge: The Chin People in Mizoram State, India (PDF) (Report). Archived from the original (PDF) on 4 June 2016.
- Krishna, Priya (27 June 2022). "In Tulsa, a Burmese Cooking Tradition Takes the Spotlight". The New York Times. ISSN 0362-4331. Archived from the original on 2 July 2022.
- Eaton, Kristi (6 December 2016). "Zomi USA: How a City in Oklahoma Became Home for an Ethnic Group from Southeast Asia". NBC News. Archived from the original on 22 March 2025.
- Fishbein, Emily (15 March 2023). "In India's Mizoram, ethnic ties drive response to Chin conflict". Frontier Myanmar.
- Graceffo, Antonio (26 July 2010). "Chin Refugees in Malaysia (Part 1)". Foreign Policy Journal.
- Strangio, Sebestian (3 February 2026). "Timor-Leste Opens Legal Proceedings Against Myanmar's Military Junta". The Diplomat. Archived from the original on 4 March 2026.
- Turner, Carol (14 February 2014). "Just Back: the tattooed women of Burma". The Daily Telegraph. Archived from the original on 2 November 2019.
- Saikia, Amrita (11 May 2026). "Forcibly Displaced Chin from Myanmar in Mizoram: Local Solidarity versus National Security". Centre of Excellence for Himalayan Studies, Shiv Nadar Institution of Eminence.
- "Between a rock and a hard place: Burmese Chin refugees in India". Refugees International. ReliefWeb. 22 July 2004. Archived from the original on 3 June 2026.
- "Chin Language Research Project aims to bridge cultural divide with Chin community". WRTV. Indianapolis. 8 July 2025. Archived from the original on 3 June 2026.
- Rubén Salgado Escudero (15 December 2013). "In the Name of the Son". Roads & Kingdoms. Archived from the original on 4 April 2017.
- Bagnall, Sam (19 April 2010). "Burma's 'forgotten' Chin people". BBC News. Archived from the original on 6 April 2016.
- Milanian, Keyan (7 December 2016). "The stunning facial inkings of a little known tribe from Myanmar that may have saved them from slavery". Daily Mirror. Archived from the original on 22 July 2025.
- Stamboulis, Dave (24 February 2022). "Myanmar's tattooed Chin women". BBC. Archived from the original on 24 November 2024.
- Fishbein, Emily; Hkawng, Jaw Tu; Brang, Hpan Ja (1 February 2024). "'Blood and sweat': Myanmar resistance fights to overturn military coup". Al Jazeera. Archived from the original on 19 March 2025.
- Kaushik, Krishn (21 March 2021). "Myanmar in turmoil, let in refugees: Mizoram CM writes to PM". The Indian Express. Archived from the original on 12 March 2023.
- Gray, Denis D. (16 March 2018). "Myanmar forces Burman culture on minorities, erases identity". AP News. Archived from the original on 3 June 2026.
- Salai Van Cung Lian (18 February 2020). "Chin National Day". Chin World. Burma News International.
- Salai Van Cung Lian; Salem-Gervais, Nicolas (November 2020). "How Many Chin Languages Should Be Taught in Government Schools? Ongoing developments and structural challenges of language-in-education policy in Chin State". Parami Journal of Education. 1 (1). ISSN 2709-2895.
- Salai Lian Ching (21 February 2019). "Wrestling with culture: Melbourne's Chin community celebrates Chin National Day". SBS. Archived from the original on 18 October 2021.
- "Face to Face With the Tattooed Women of Chin". The Irrawaddy. 3 February 2014. Archived from the original on 13 July 2024.
- "In pictures: the last tattoo-faced women of Myanmar's Lai Tu Chin tribe". South China Morning Post. 27 June 2016. Archived from the original on 23 July 2025.
- Nyein Ei Ei Htwe (17 November 2013). "Chin tattoos: a fading tradition". Myanmar Times. Archived from the original on 2 July 2015.
- Kee Shein Mang (November 2006). "A Syntactic and Pragmatic Description of Verb Stem Alternation in K'chò, a Chin Language" (PDF). Payap University. Archived (PDF) from the original on 1 May 2020.
- Weil, Shalva (1996). "Double Conversion among the 'Children of Menasseh'". In Pfeffer, Georg; Behera, Deepak K. (eds.). Contemporary Society: Tribal Studies. New Delhi: Concept.
- Weil, Shalva (2004). "Lost Israelites from North-East India: Re-Traditionalisation and Conversion among the Shinlung from the Indo-Burmese Borderlands". The Anthropologist. 6 (3).
- Myo Myo (29 April 2011). "A symbol of Chin identity fades away". Myanmar Times. Vol. 26, no. 515. Archived from the original on 14 February 2013.
- "CRC". OHCHR. Archived from the original on 12 June 2025.
- "Chin group documents forced labor incidents: report". Mizzima. ReliefWeb. 30 August 2012. Archived from the original on 26 June 2024.
- Maung Zami (7 October 2023). "Myanmar's Nationwide Ceasefire Agreement of 2015: A Critical Look at Myanmar Military's Peace and State Building since 1962". FORSEA. Archived from the original on 6 August 2026.
- Tepper, Daniel (20 September 2021). "Glimpses of 'Lost Tribe' Jewish Communities in India and Myanmar". The New York Times. ISSN 0362-4331. Archived from the original on 8 March 2022.
- Gougin, T. (1984). History of Zomi. Churachandpur, Manipur. OCLC 556461464.
- Kerman, Garret (7 December 2025). "Joshua Van becomes second-youngest and first Asian-born male UFC Champion at UFC 323". Yahoo News.
