= Asho Chin =

Asho or Asho Chin may refer to:

- Asho Chin people
- Asho Chin language
