= Tashons people =

Ethnic group in Myanmar

Tashons (Taisun, Tlaisun, Fahlam) တာရွှန်း
Regions with significant populations
- Chin State

Languages
- Tashon language

Religion
- Christianity

Related ethnic groups
- other Chin peoples

The Tashon people (also called Taisun, Tlaisun, or Fahlam; Burmese: တာရွှန်း) are an ethnic group in the central region of Chin State, Myanmar. Historically, the Tashons were considered the most powerful tribe in the northern Chin Hills prior to British annexation. Their influence extended from the borders of Manipur in the north to the Phau River in the south, and from the Lushai Hills in the west to the Kalay–Kabaw Valley in the east.

Unlike many neighboring Chin tribes who practiced hereditary chieftainship, the Tashons operated under a democratic governance system. Leaders were elected by the people and formed the governing body known as the Fahlam Council, or Nam Kap. The Tashons have their own language, customs, and cultural traditions.

== Origins ==
According to oral tradition, the ancestral figures of the Tashon people emerged from a rock formation known as Lailun, believed to be the mythical birthplace of the Chin. One of the earliest chiefs, Pu Thuan Kai, is said to have established leadership at Lailun. His descendants include the ruling clans of Hlawncheu, Zahau, Hauhulh, and other native lineages considered to form the core of the Tashon people (also referred to as Taisun Hrinkhat).

== History ==
=== Founding of Fahlam ===
Around the 16th century, Pu Tashon left Lailun and established a village named after himself. Frequent tribal raids forced the Tashons to relocate, eventually founding the settlement of Fahlam. According to local lore, *Fa* means "children" and *Hlam* means "a secure place," reflecting its role as a refuge during conflict.

The original Tashon village was later abandoned due to superstition. A tale tells of a Burmese woman, dressed in silk and jewels, appearing mysteriously in a cave above the village. Anyone who saw her died soon after, prompting the move to Fahlam. At its peak, Fahlam had six quarters and over 600 households. When the British arrived in 1892, around 500 households were recorded.

=== Rise to power ===
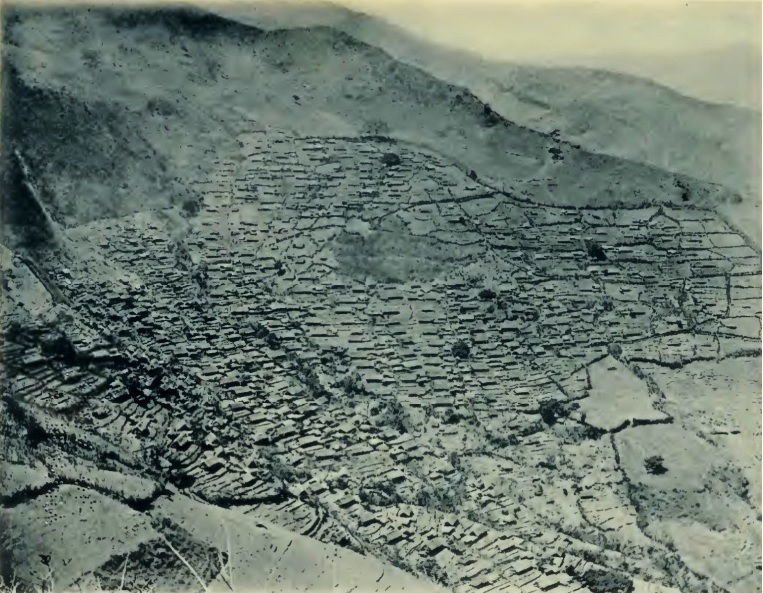
The Tashon capital, Fahlam 1892 (now Taisun village)

The Tashons expanded their influence through trade and diplomacy. They established a key trade route between Fahlam and the Kalay Valley, building a suspension bridge over the Manipur River. In alliance with the Kalay Valley Sawbwa, they protected lowland villages from raids and punished aggressors. In return, the Tashons gained exclusive trading rights to valuable goods such as salt and iron, which they distributed throughout the Chin Hills.

This trade monopoly and the tribe’s strategic alliances enabled the Tashons to become the most influential political and military force in the region. Their governance model and their ability to unite Chin tribes under a common cause distinguished them from other groups.

=== British encounters and resistance ===
The Tashons initially attempted to maintain peaceful relations with the British after their arrival in Upper Burma in 1885. However, tensions escalated as the British sought to open trade routes and exert control over Chin territory. Pu Con Bik and other leaders resisted British demands and provided asylum to dissidents, including Burmese royalty and deposed local rulers.

Between 1888 and 1890, the Tashons led and coordinated several raids alongside allied Chin tribes against British military posts in the Kalay Valley. This culminated in the British launching the Chin-Lushai Expeditions, aimed at subduing the Chin Hills.

=== Submission and British occupation ===
In March 1890, faced with overwhelming military pressure, the Tashons agreed to British terms under General Symons. They consented to pay annual tribute but retained a degree of local autonomy. A second expedition followed in 1891 due to continued Tashon opposition and failure to comply fully with British requirements.

In 1892, the British occupied Fahlam and established a permanent post. Due to unsanitary conditions in the original village, a new town was built three miles northwest—this became modern-day Falam. The town was named after the Tashon capital to symbolize British dominance.

== Administration and governance ==
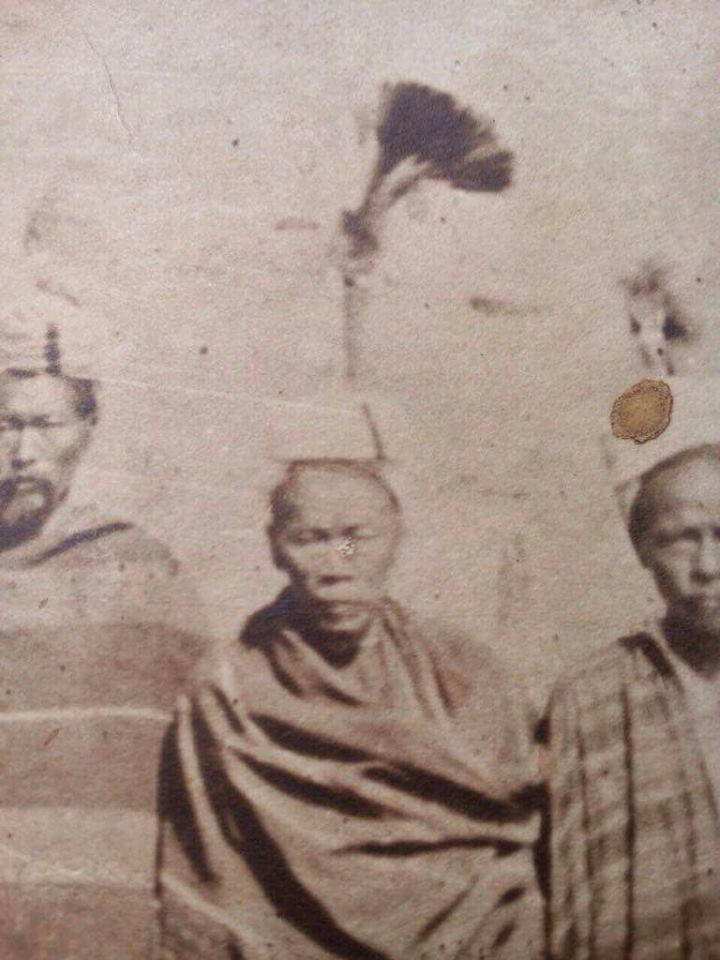
The Chin Leader, The Tashons Democratic Council leader Pu Con Bik aka Bo Son Pek

The Tashons practiced a unique democratic system. Leadership was based on merit, and chiefs were elected for their abilities in warfare, trade, and diplomacy. The Fahlam Council consisted of five elected chiefs from various key villages. Notable council leaders included Pu Con Bik (also known as Son Pek), Pu Mang Hlur, and Pu Kha Lian. The council ruled collectively, and no single member could make unilateral decisions.

== Legacy and modern recognition ==
Despite losing their autonomy, the Tashons retained cultural prestige among Chin communities. Their former capital, now known as Tashon village, continues to exist and was designated a heritage site in 2016. It is now a popular cultural tourism destination and serves as a symbol of Chin unity and resistance.

== See also ==
- List of ethnic groups in Myanmar
- Falam Township
