= Haka–Lusei War =

Conflict between the Haka people and the Lusei people

Date	c. 1775
Location	Chin–Lushai Hills
Result	Haka victory Lusei forced to flee across the Ṭiau river

Belligerents
Haka soldiers and Burman allies	Lusei soldiers

Commanders and leaders
Liandun (Haka); Myat San (Saopha of Htilin)	Lusei chiefs

Strength
200 Burman soldiers armed with guns and two brass cannons	N/A

The Haka–Lusei War was a significant conflict between the Haka people and the Lusei, fought during the mid-to-late 18th century. The war was a result of escalating tensions between the two groups, with the Haka seeking to assert dominance in the region and the Lusei resisting encroachment on their territory.

== Background ==
The Haka had successfully subdued neighbouring tribes such as the Sunthla and had established dominance in the region. Their ambitions brought them into conflict with the Lusei, who occupied large villages on the western slopes of the Rungthlang range. The Lusei had long been under pressure from eastern tribes like the Haka, Zahau, and Thlanthlang, forcing them to migrate westward.

After subjugating the Sunthlas and Yahows the Haka turned their attention to the Lusei tribes settled on the banks of Lai Va (Eat of Kwelhring Klang) which was 20 miles west of Haka. The chief villages of the Lusei were the Khawlhring and Vanzang which were considered large for their time. Due to the power of Khawlhring and Vanzang, the Lusei tribes continued to posture and threaten the Haka tribes or harass them.

To strengthen their position, the Haka sought external assistance. Liandun, a leader of the Nunthua Suan family, undertook the task of allying with the Burmans. This period coincided with the campaigns of Alaungpaya, the Burmese king who had recently devastated Manipur and Assam (1758). After years of negotiation, Liandun convinced Myat San, the saopha of Tilin, to join the Haka forces. Myat San brought 200 men armed with guns and two brass cannons, significantly bolstering the Haka’s military capabilities.

== The War ==
The combined forces of the Haka and the Burmans launched a surprise attack on the Lusei at dawn. The Lusei, who were poorly armed compared to their attackers, were caught off guard. The Lusei at the time did not haveaccess to firearms. Unable to withstand the onslaught, they fled westward across the Tiau River in disarray, abandoning their villages. For months after the initial attack, Haka warriors ravaged Lusei settlements, ensuring that the Lusei could not regroup. The Lusei defeat significantly weakened their position in the region, and the Haka emerged as a dominant power The Haka failed to chase the Lusei beyond the river as the rains made the river unfordable.

The younger branches of the Nunthwa Sun family occupied Klang Khua and the earlier main towns of the Thangur clan such as Lungzarh.

== Aftermath ==
Following their victory over the Lusei, the Haka gained the respect of neighboring tribes. The Zahau and Thlanthlang, previously hostile, made peace with the Haka. This newfound stability allowed the Haka to expand their territory, founding new villages in the region.

In 1795 the Klang Klang allied themselves to the Haka via marriage. The Klang Klang (Tlang Tlang) were a Mara tribe. By securing their alliance with the Haka, the Klang Klang used all their resources on further pushing on the Lusei in the west. The Klang Klang succeeded in pushing the further west and occupied areas such as the Blue Mountains, Tuipui River. Due to the fear of a second Chin invasion, the Lusei chiefs joined Selesih, which had been established previously as a confederation of chiefs in one of the largest settlements in Lusei history.

== Sources ==
- Verghese, C.G.; Thanzawna, R.L. (1997). A History of the Mizos. New Delhi: Vikas Publishing House.
