= Cheery Zahau =

Chin human rights activist

Cherry Zahau
- ချယ်ရီဇာဟောင်
- Born: Tuan Cer Sung; 1981 (age 44–45); Kalaymyo, Myanmar
- Education: Mahidol University; Institute of Human Rights and Peace Studies
- Occupations: Women's right activist, Politician, Writer
- Known for: Human rights activist
- Political party: Chin Progressive Party
- Children: 2

Cheery Zahau (Burmese: ချယ်ရီဇာဟောင်, also spelt Cherry Zahau; born Tuan Cer Sung; in 1981) is a Chin human rights activist, women's right activist, feminist, politician, writer, development and peace in Burma and also based in India and Thailand. She is the founder and leader of the Women's League of Chinland.

== Early life and education ==
Cheery Zahau was born in 1981 in Kalaymyo, Sagaing Region to ethnic Chin parents. She finished high school in her hometown, Kalaymyo then fled to India where she studied high school again. She continues her distance undergraduate studies at Thompson Rivers University Open Learning and studied for one year for a graduate degree at Institute of Human Rights and Peace Studies, Mahidol University. Cheery currently lives between Falam in Chin State and Yangon. She is a mother of two children — a daughter and a son.

== Career and movement ==
Cheery Zahau left Burma in 1999 when she was 17 and settled in India and joined the Chin women's group operating in Mizoram, along the India-Burma border. She started volunteering with the Chin Women Organisation, on the India-Burma border since 1999, teaching Chin and Burmese language to Chin children who were born or growing up in Mizoram. Then, she continued volunteering with the organisation through small fund-raising activities, like selling kitchen utilities.

In 2003, she was interning with the Central Chin Women Organization and she was helping to publish a quarterly bulletin “Rih Lasi” which featured articles and stories written by women in different Chin dialects, and to organize monthly Women's Exchange as well as other office works. She successfully formed "Women’s League of Chinland". She is a major author of the “Unsafe State” report, which includes first-hand research on systemic sexual violence against Chin women committed by the government military troops.

In 2004, she was an intern with Alternative Asean Network on Burma (Altean-Burma) that gave she a chance to explore about the Chin situation in Mizoram and Chin State. She met with political leaders from Burma and other countries. In 2007, she spoke at the British Parliament along with other Chin delegates, and that was the first time the Chin political activists were speaking at the parliament. During this trip, she met about 20 British parliamentary members, European Union, high level officials at State Department. It was organised by Christian Solidarity Worldwide and Humanitarian Aid Relief Trust (HART). She coordinated two major reports to UN UPR, UN CRC and contributed to UN CEDAW shadow reports. She has testified at the United Nations, British Parliament, United States congressional hearing and other governments on human rights situation in Chin State and Burma.

Cheery Zahau relocated to Chiang Mai, Thailand, she began working as an advocacy officer at the Human Rights Education Institute of Burma, focusing on the United Nations Human Rights Council, the Convention on the Rights of the Child, and the ASEAN human rights process. She is also a management board member of the Network for Human Rights Documentation in Burma and is pursuing an advanced degree in international relations.

She was awarded “Chin Person of the Year 2011” by the Chin people. The Irrawaddy Magazine listed her as one of “Burma’s News Makers 2011”. She has trained hundreds of people on human rights and women's human rights over the past 15 years. She is also the author of several qualitative research reports on Women's Access to Justice in Plural Legal System in Burma, LGBT rights and the Rule of Law, Youth Movement Assessment, Women's Security and Peace, Sexual violence and minor rape, and service provisions in Burma, among others. She gives human rights training and education and women's human rights over the past 15 years.

Cheery Zahau is Country Program Director (Myanmar) at the Project 2049 Institute and also UN HRC Representative of Persons of Concern Myanmar.

In 2012, she returned to Myanmar and she started run politic and democracy movement. She is one of five women candidates from the Chin Progressive Party (CPP). In the 2015 election, she contesting for House of Representatives seat from Falam township constituency, Chin State, but lost to Salai Ranbai, a National League for Democracy Party candidate.

== Awards ==
She is awarded 2018 Schuman Human Rights Award by European Union Myanmar Delegation and awarded by UNDP for N-Peace Award 2017.
