= Khan Thuam =

Sukte Chief

- Died: 1848
- Predecessor: Mang Kim
- Successor: Za Pau (official); Kam Hau (de-facto)
- Parent(s): Mang Kim; Kap Cin

Khan Thuam (died 1848) was a Sukte chief in the Northern Chin Hills in Myanmar. Khan Thuam was responsible for unifying the tribes causing immigration into Manipur and for being the father of Chief Kam Hau.

== Early life ==
Khan Thuam was the son of Mang Kim and Kap Cin (Kap Cing). Mang Kim died when Khan Thuam was a child and he was raised by his widowed mother in Mualbem. At the age of 10, Khan Thuam worked as a herder of the mithun of the village. Under traditional custom to choose the sialcing mang (transl. Chief Herd-boy), Khan Thuam wrested his way to the top. A kinsman, Kaih Mang, saw Khan Thuam as a rival and decided to send a man to kill him. The assassin, however, was foiled when Khan Thuam wrestled him to the ground and, with his mother's intervention, was killed by her. To fix his social standing and avoid further enemies, Khan Thuam married Gawh Cing (Gawh Ciin), the daughter of Kaih Mang. They settled in Mualbem and had a son, Kam Hau and Pau Kam (Za Pau). Khan Thuam became a distinguished warrior during wars and a leader during battles. Due to this, nine hausa (transl. headsmen) plotted to kill Khan Thuam.

The nine headsmen were:

- Saizang hausa:Pum Vial
- Vengteh hausa Tun kam
- Lamzang hausa Vuite Mang Song (Mang Sum)
- Sukte Kaih Mang of Mualbem
- Lophei hausa Do mang
- Kalzang hausa Cin Put (Ciang Phut)
- Thuklai hausa Suan Thuk
- Khuasak hausa Go mang
- Buanman hausa Hang Kam

The nine headsmen held a council and proposed to kill him due to his rivalling fame and leadership. Khan Thuam learned of the conspiracy and left Mualbem with his family to seek the protection of the Tedim chief Vuite Kam Lam. Under one of his villages, he met a headman, Lang Za of the Manlun clan, and gave him a necklace to disguise him as a disguised labourer. The nine headsmen inquired of Khan Thuam's whereabouts in Tedim and learned of him as a labourer there, but could not make the journey to reach him. A spy of the conspiring headmen spotted Khan Thuam's stone figure in a taro field and confirmed that he would strike him the following day to the conspirators. However, Khan Thuam, with his family, left for Darlang (Rallang) under the Zahau chiefs.

Khan Thuam left Tedim via a Manipur rope ferry at midnight through Lamzang. While ferrying his family, his rope was cut, and he was carried downstream; however, he maintained his grip on the rope despite the current and landed on a far bank. The assassins who dared not swim the dangerous current went back to report on the escape to Rallang. The assassins were ordered to identify Khan Thuam via his shield and spear, which he personally carried. The assassins made for Sang kun (Saukong) hill to ambush Khan Thuam. However, Khan Thuam had handed his spear and shield to a servant while he went to ablutions. The assassins killed the servant, believing the spear and shield carrier to be Khan Thuam himself. Khan Thuam and his family arrived in Rallang and informed Khuang Ceu (Khawi Tel) of Rallang, asking for protection.

== Chieftainship ==
Khan Thuam after a few years in Rallang requested Khuang Ceu's aid in revenge on the nine hausa that tried to kill him. The village of Rallang supported his request. Khan Thuam and his son Kam Hau targeted Mualbem and sent messengers to warn people of the raid. However, Mualbem sent a messenger requesting not to be raided and offered him to be their headmen instead and to be allied to future wars. Mualbem thus escaped destruction. With the support of Limkhai, Mualbem and Rallang, Khan Thuam raided Vangteh and shared captives equally among his allies. However, Khan Thuam renegotiated the agreement and kept all the captives by promising submission to the Limkai Chief Zel Vum. Khan Thuam later defeated Kalzang, Dimpi, Dimlo, and Phaileng, making them all his subjects.

Following his revenge, Khan Thuam wished to return to Mualbem. Khuang Ceu consulted his elders and felt Khan Thuam was too valuable to let go. With the intervention of Thang Cil (Thang Tir) of Lamtuk, Khuang Ceu allowed Kam Hau and his family to go back to Mualbem. Kam Hau settled in Mualbem and returned to Rallang years later, persuading Khuang Ceu to return his father, Khan Thuam, to him. Khan Thuam lived with Kam Hau in Mualbem. When Gawh Ciin died, Khan Thuam remarried with Kam Vung of Khuasak. With his sons, Khan Thuam conscripted men from conquered villages and invaded the Zo villages of Vang-lai, Tungkhua, Tualzang, Thenmual, Thangkhal, Belpi, Tawtak, Khuadai and Lailui.

Khan Thuam maintained a grudge against the Guite tribe who planned to kill him before. Thus when he passed through Tedim, Lamzang and Losau during war expeditions, he was so merciless that they migrated to Manipur. Only seven families remained in Lamzang. One of these families, the Hatzaw feared raids from Falam and turned to Kam Hau to rule them. Khan Thuam lived with Kam Hau in Lamzang as a result. Following Kam Hau's extension into Manipur territory, Khan Thuam and his son Za Pau was given the tract between the Lua lui and Thui lui streams.

== Later life ==
In 1848, Khan Thuam died and was succeeded by his son Za Pau. His son Kam Hau, however, expanded power and influence, eclipsing Za Pau.

== Sources ==
- Pau, S. Khup (2011). A Northern Chin Tradition (PDF). United Kingdom: Sean Kingston Publishing. ISBN 978-1-912385-61-4.
- Pau, Pum Khan (2020). Indo-Burma Frontier and the Making of the Chin Hills: Empire and Resistance. Taylor & Francis. ISBN 978-1-000-50745-4.
