= Lai people =

Ethnic group in India and Myanmar

Laimi

Total population
- ~170,000 (as of 1991)

Regions with significant populations

Languages
- Lai holh, Hakha holh (Central Kuki-Chin languages)

Religion
- Christianity (Majority), Buddhism (Minority); Formerly: Animism

Related ethnic groups
- Chin people, Mizo people, Mara people, Bawm people, other Kuki-Chin groups
- Estimated population from Lalthangliana (2001)

The Lai people (Note: Also called "Laimi".) (also referred to as the Pawi people in India) (Note: Alternative spelling: Poi people.) primarily inhabit the central part of the Chin Hills in Myanmar’s Chin State, particularly in the townships of Falam, Thantlang, and Hakha. In India, they are also found in the Lawngtlai district of Mizoram, where they are governed by the Lai Autonomous District Council. Outside this region, they are scattered across Mizoram and parts of Manipur. Their languages—Lai ṭong and Hakha holh—are classified under Central Kuki-Chin languages. The Lai peoples are predominantly Christian.

== Demography ==
The total population of the Lai people was estimated to be around 170,000 in 1991. The term "Laimi" often refers specifically to Chin people living in Central Chin State, including Hakha, Thantlang, and Falam.

Lai communities are also found outside Myanmar—in Mizoram (particularly Khuafo and Thlantlang/Tuichhak Pawih), the Chin Hills (Hakha Township, Thantlang Township, Webulah, Zokhua, Keiphaw, Falam Township), and parts of Bangladesh, where they are sometimes identified as Bawm people (Bawmzo, Bawmlai, Panghawi, Ramthar, and Sunthla).

== Origins ==
The Lai of the Lai Autonomous District Council in Mizoram are a subgroup of the broader Lai population found in Myanmar and neighboring regions. They share common ancestry with several tribes of Northeast India. Oral tradition holds that the Lai once lived in China before migrating through the Tibetan mountains into the Chin Hills of Burma, from where some migrated into Mizoram in the early 18th century or earlier.

Some traditions claim the Lai are descendants of the Qin dynasty. British colonial records used the term "Shendoo" or "Shendu" to refer to groups like the Lakher (now known as the Mara), who are believed to be offshoots of the Lai. F. Chhawnmanga, a retired District Adult Education Officer in Mizoram, conducted interviews with Lakher chiefs who identified their lineage as stemming from Lai families in Hakha. For example, the chief Kilkhara of Saiha and Tawngliana of Serkawr traced their ancestry to the Hlawnchhing family.

Vumson, a historian, supported this connection, noting that the Mara and Lai share similar customs, languages, and clan names such as Hlawnchhing, Chinzah, Bawikhar, Khenglawt, and Thianhlun. Other groups such as the Bawm and the Tlanglau, living in western Mizoram and Bangladesh, also share linguistic and cultural similarities with the Lai.

== Culture ==
Lai people traditionally engage in slash-and-burn agriculture. Some earn money by selling produce and livestock in township markets.

=== Chin National Day ===
Chin National Day is celebrated annually on 20 February, commemorating the General Assembly of Chinland held in 1948. The first Chin National Day was celebrated in Mindat in 1951 and attended by U Nu, Burma’s first Prime Minister.

Celebrations include traditional dances such as Ruakhatlak, Khuang Cawi, Sarlamkai, Rallu lam, fashion shows, beauty pageants, and wrestling (Laipaih). The most notable Laipaih wrestler is Rung Lian Ceu from Chuncung village, now residing in the United States.

=== Clothing ===
There are many distinct styles of traditional clothing among Chin subgroups, including Matupi, Hakha, Htantlang, Falam, Zophei, Zotung, and Mindat. Most traditional garments feature red and black, with accessories like necklaces, bracelets, and hairpins. These are worn on special occasions such as Chin National Day, the Tho (Chin New Year), Sundays, Christmas, and weddings.

=== Greeting ===
Handshakes are the common form of greeting in Chin culture.

=== Sports ===
Popular sports among the Laimi include traditional Chin wrestling (Laipaih), football (soccer), and volleyball.

=== Tho (Chin New Year) ===
Tho is the Chin harvest and New Year festival, celebrated in October.

== Bibliography ==
- Dun, E. W. (1992) [1886], Gazetteer of Manipur, Manas Publications – via archive.org
- Pau, Pum Khan (2019), Indo-Burma Frontier and the Making of the Chin Hills: Empire and Resistance, Taylor & Francis, ISBN 9781000507454
