= Zozu =

Alcoholic beverage from Chin State, Myanmar

Zu or Zozu is an alcoholic beverage similar to a beer and locally made by the Zo people in Chin State, Myanmar. The term Zu can also refer to alcoholic beverages in general. It is traditionally fermented alcohol that is usually made with maize, rice, or other grains that are available and mixed with yeast.
