= Chin chieftainship =

System of indigenous administration of the Chin people

Chin chieftainship refers to the system of chieftainship historically used by the Chin people, which was implemented via hereditary or elective rule. Chieftainship among the Chins persisted from the precolonial era through the British colonial period and Burmese independence before being abolished in 1948.

== Society of Chin chiefdoms ==
Chin society during the chiefdom era consisted of three classes, namely Bawi-phun (transl. noble class), Mi-chia/Zaran (transl. ordinary class) and sal (transl. slaves).

=== Bawi-phun ===
The Bawi-phun class was a noble class who held the mandate of "khua nih a hnuai mi hna", the khua spirit of the village.

==== Ram-uk ====
The Ram-uk was the chief of traditional Chin Chiefdoms. ram-uk refers to "ruler of the land" in translation. The chief claimed legitimacy from the khua-hrum and used it as the mandate to rule. He was considered, along with his descendants, to have the privilege of owning and controlling the land as khua-hrum. This belief encouraged chiefs to hand power down through their descendants, thereby creating a hereditary structure.

The powers of a chief included the right of distribution of unoccupied plots (Lo-lawng). The right to split up large unoccupied plots into smaller units for population changes or emergencies. The right of partitioning rotational fields (Lobung) into plots (lopil). The right to delineate and alternate boundaries of rotational fields. Additionally, the right to grant permission to cultivate specially rescued areas such as Tuklaw or Khua Hmawng lands.

Land was distributed by the chief to the families of the entire community, and these families had the right to pass down their plots as inheritance to their descendants. The chief collected a tax from the plots known as Lo-nga which was determined on a household basis. The chief also imposed a religious tax known as Tual man, which was levied on the community's khua-hrum. As sovereign over the land, the chief also exerted control over and ownership of all the community's resources, including water, wood, and other amenities. He would have the right to demand sa-haw, the flesh of animals hunted by men via their hind leg or the tusks of an elephant. The chief also received a tax on every animal sacrificed at feasts or religious festivals, such as the foreleg or hind leg, known as sa-khua. If the chief ruled multiple villages, he taxed each village as a unit an amount known as khua-man.

One of the unique privileges of a chief was that their house was built by his subjects on voluntary labour and effort. Subjects would also carry the belongings, property and burdens of a chief and his family voluntarily.

==== Tlangbawi ====
Tlangbawi refers to the priest. Typically, a chief and a priest took on the same role. However, when the community got too large, the role became more complex with a community priest and a household priest emerging. The community priest was typically the younger brother or youngest son of the patriach of the tribe or clan; this role became hereditary. The community priest was expected to take a nutak as a wife, a woman of a chiefly or noble class. The priest or chief was still permitted to have a lesser wife known as nuchun as long as it wasn't a legal marriage. if it became a legal marriage, the office and role were abolished and it was relected by the nobles to a new lineage. The functionary role of Tlangbawi was to assist in khua-hrum worship such as making holy water or organising ritual affairs.

The household priest did not hold a religious office, but instead managed the household's religious affairs. The role was typically filled by the head of the household or clan elder, who performed sacrificial ceremonies for their family and people. These sacrifices were typically for sickness, such as Zing-dangah. For example, the marriage Zing-dangah to legalise a marriage and unite the zing of the husband and wife. When a baby was born, the husband would act as the household priest for the Nua-Zing-dangah.

=== Phunsang ===
These were individuals who were part of the noble classes and clans, but not of the same clan as the chief. They would pay taxes but be exempt from manual labour. The Phunsang assisted the chief in ruling his council. managing military affairs, and assigning leadership to villages.

=== Mi-Chia le Zaran ===
The Mi-cha are the common people. They are divided into two groups. Mi-chia Phun thiang are considered the clean clans and Mi-chia phun thiang lo are unclean clans which refer to association with witchraft and evil eyes/omens. Phun thiang lo were treated as outcasts and regarded to be evil people as the Chin believed they caused death and sickness to others. This is because sickness and misfortune were attributed to the doings of evil spirits. The evil spirits were known as hnam. The phun thiang were ordinary people who were treated neither as nobles or slaves. They paid tributes and taxes with some allowed to assist the chief with prestige by doing festival rituals.

A normal person could become a noble person if they married into the elite family for two generations. If one's grandfather and father married into an elite family, then the grandson is considered a nobleman. The bride price for an elite woman was 5 times the price of a normal woman.

=== Sal ===
Sal (transl. slave) were categorised into three groups: war captives surrendered or captured in raids, debtor slaves and slaves who became so due to being pawned by gambling relatives. The slave class itself had two levels. One was a slave which lived with their master in their house, known as Inn chung khar sal. This category was considered the lowest in Chin social status and hierarchy. They could be sold for guns, bison and even bride prices and dowries. Ordinary slaves were known as inn lak sal which refers to those who lived independent of their master in terms of housing. They worked for their master alongside the house slaves but could not be sold to others. They were kept anonymous without any clan names to identify them.

== Abolition of chieftainship ==
In February 1948, representatives from all parts of Chin State held a three-day conference at Falam to discuss the traditional chiefs and other systems of governance. Most representatives felt the chiefs could no longer lead well. On 20 February 1948, an overwhelming majority voted to abolish chieftainship in favor of establishing a democratic political system. The occasion is celebrated annually as Chin National Day.

== Sources ==
- Sakhong, Lian H. (2000). Religion and Politics among the Chin People in Burma (1896–1949). Myanmar: Uppsala University. ISBN 978-9185424580.
- Sakhong, Lian H. (2003). In Search of Chin Identity: A study in Religion, Politics and Ethnic Identity in Burma (PDF). Denmark: NIAS Press. ISBN 87-91114-15-2.
