= Chin Student Association =

Student body of the Zomi people in India

The Chin Students' Association (CSA) is the student body of the Zomi people living in the country of India. It is one of the main bodies of the TCU or Tedim Chin Union.

There is also another body known as the CYA, or Chin Youth Association. It is the youth organisation of the Chin. It works for the development and upliftment of the Chin people. There is also a Tedim Chin Cultural Club (TCCC) Hall at Lanva in the Churandpur District of Manipur, India. The Chin Student Association plays an important role in the student activities of the Chin.

== See also ==
- Akhil Bharatiya Vidyarthi Parishad
