= Chin State =

State of Myanmar

Chin State ချင်းပြည်နယ်
- State

Myanmar transcription(s)
  - Burmese: hkyang: pranynai
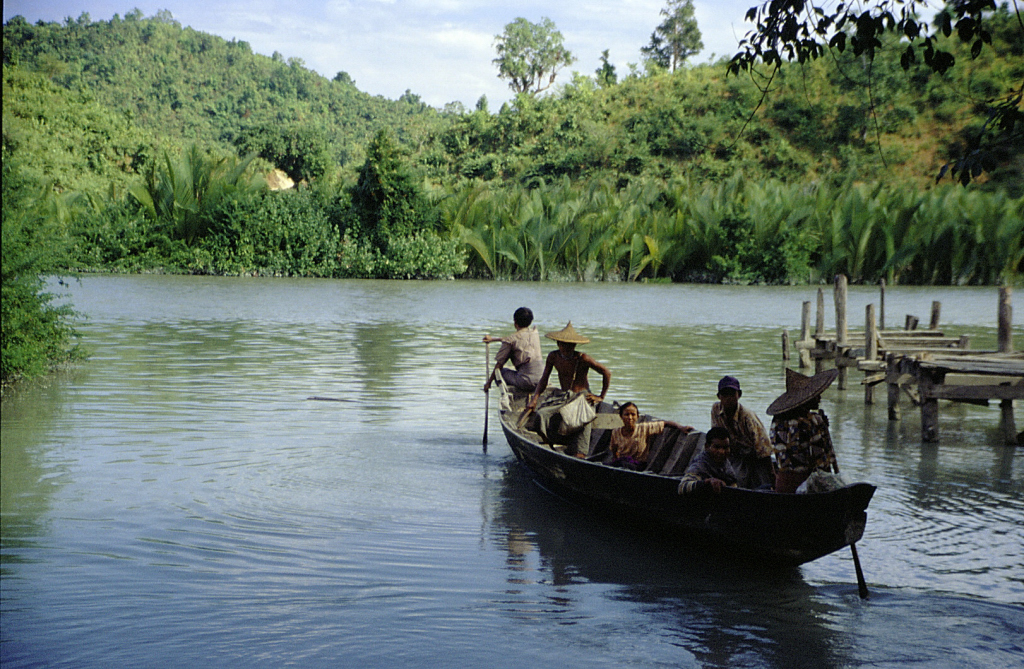
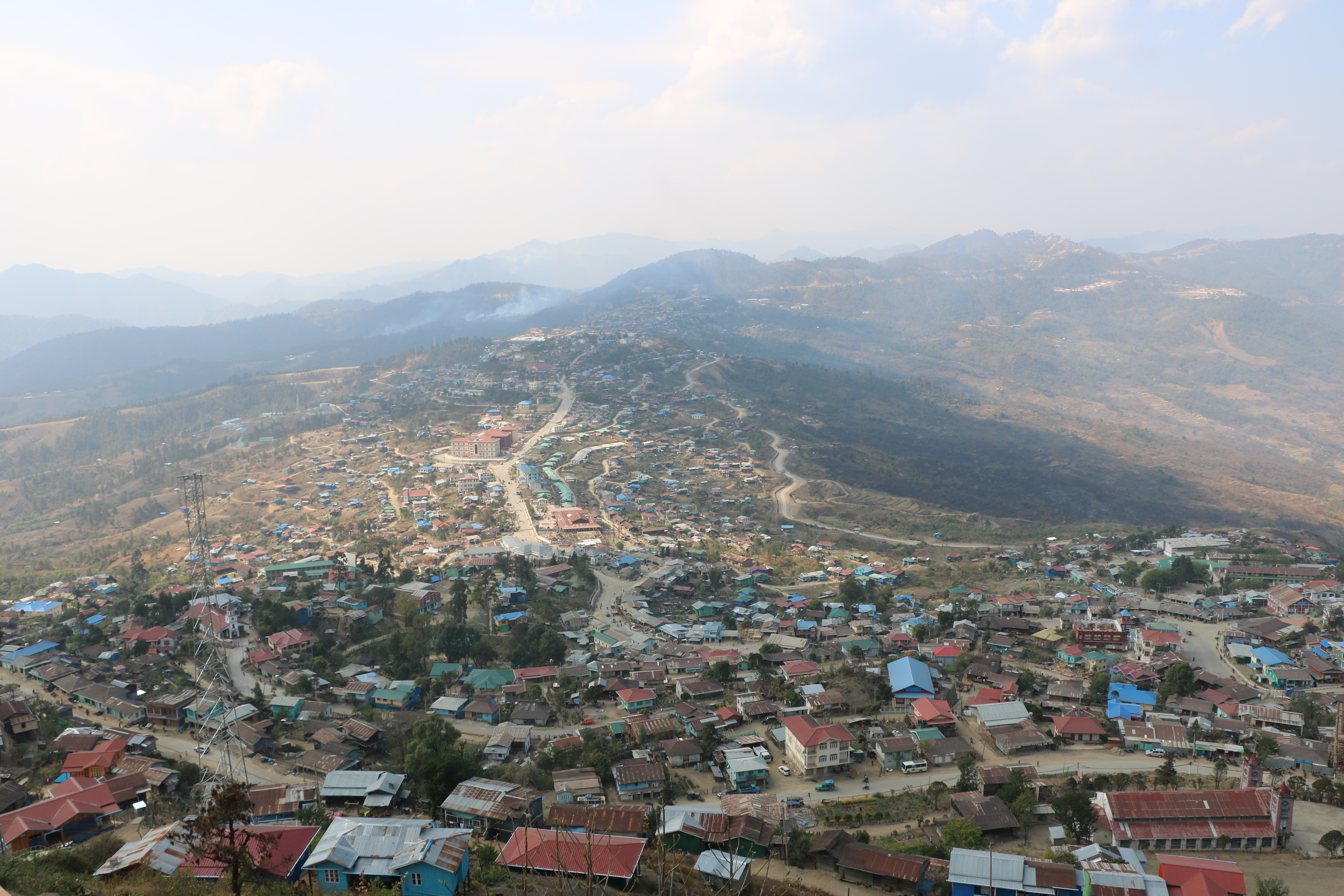
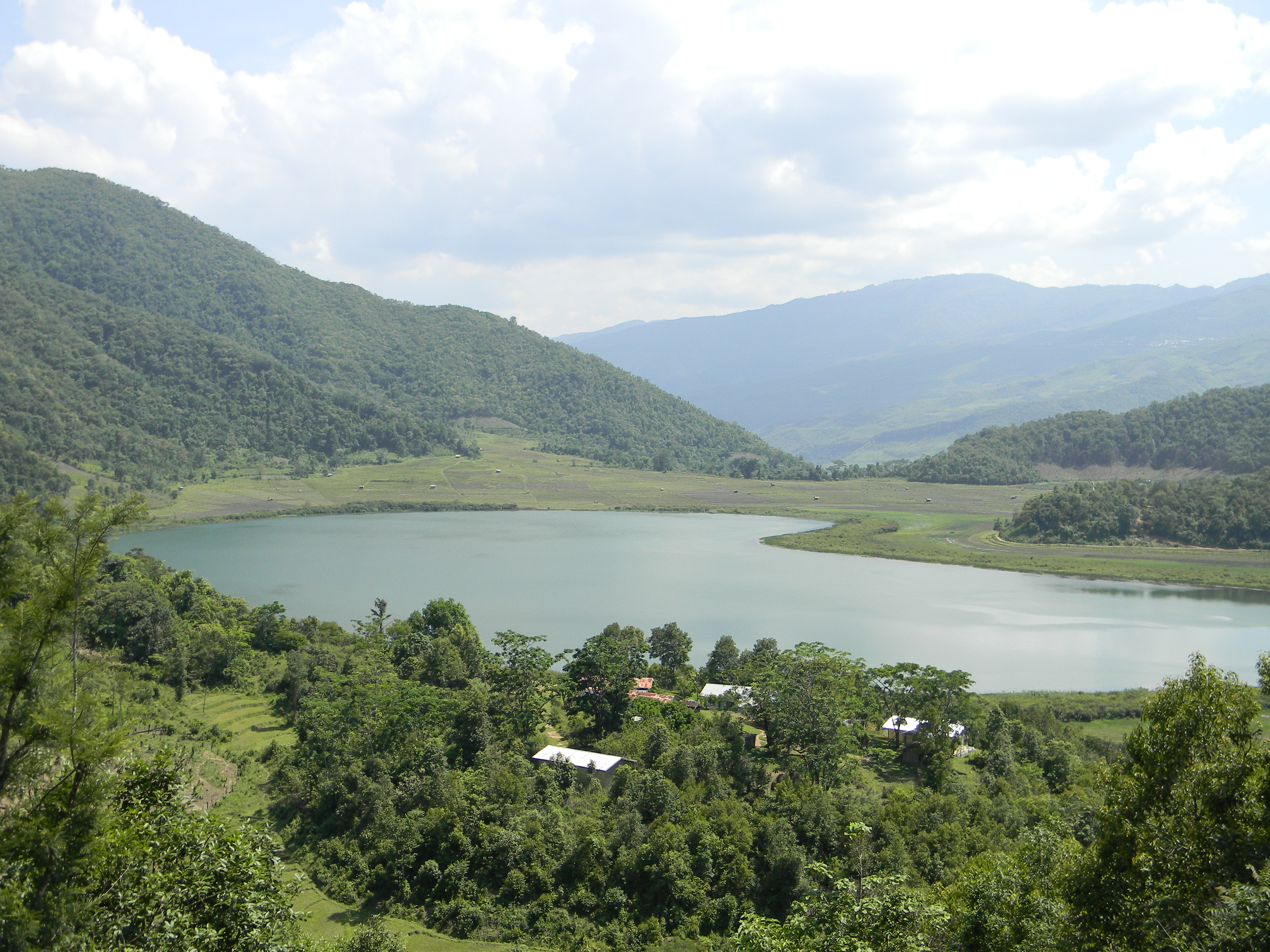
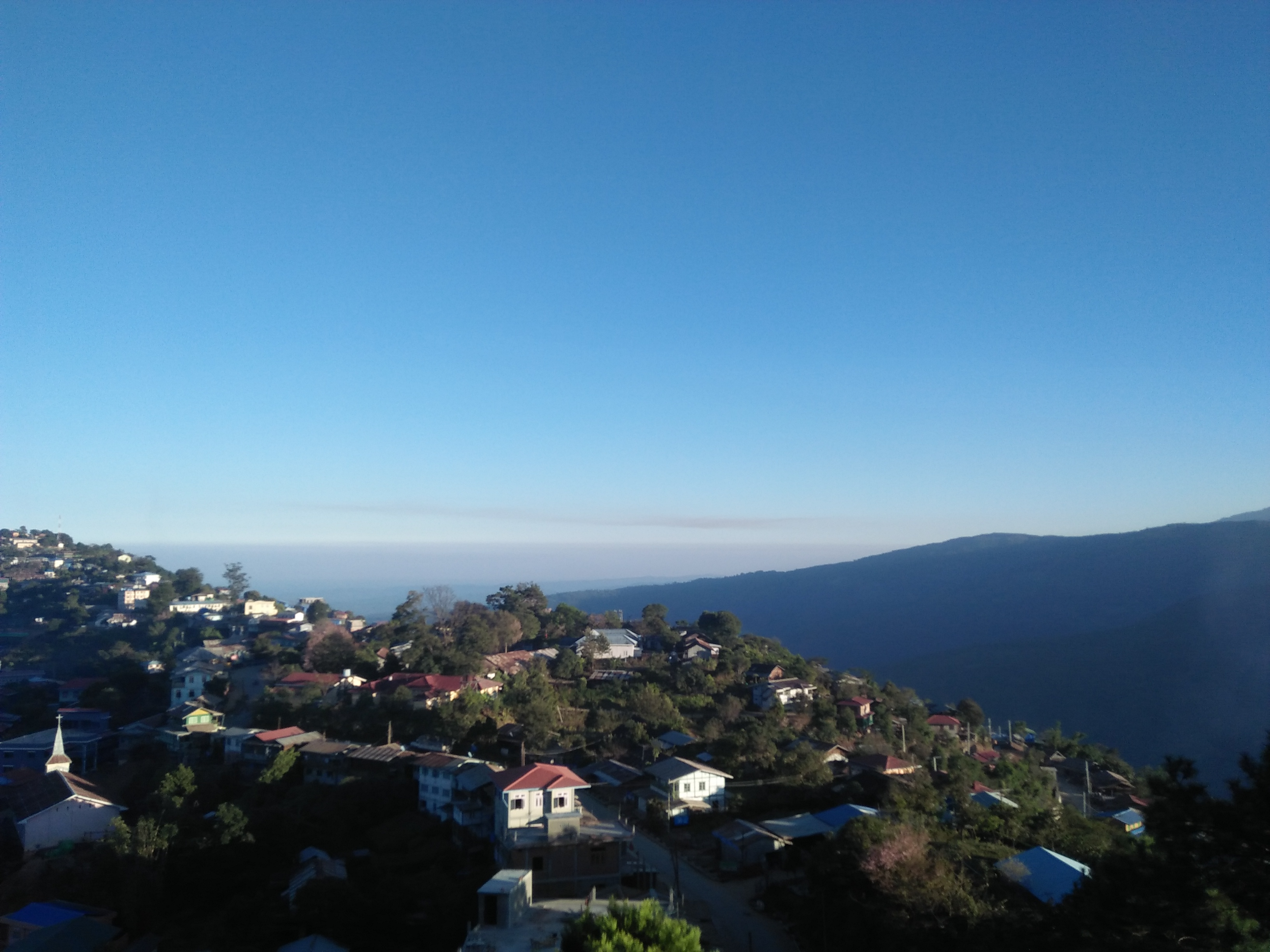
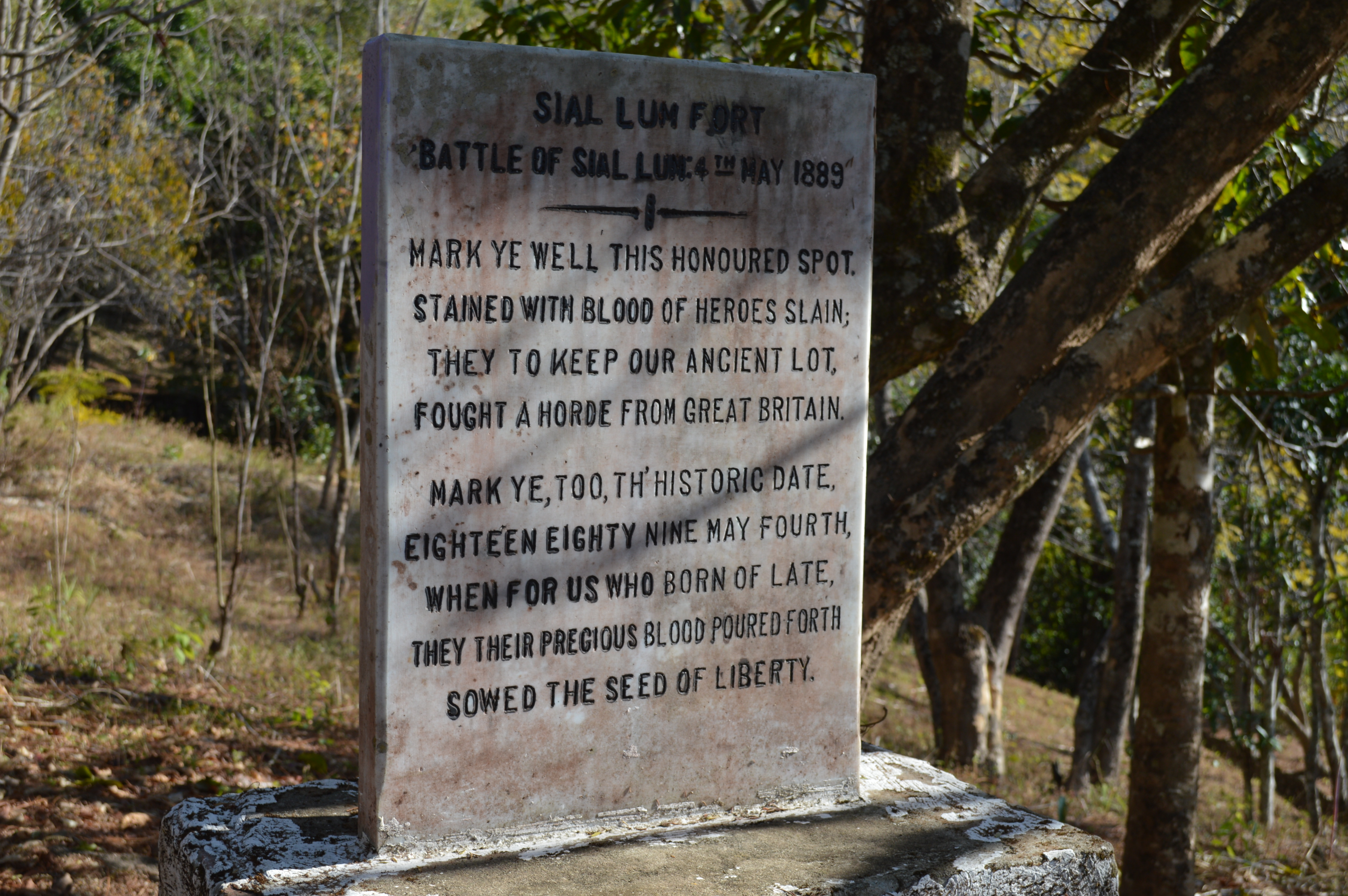
- Local ferry Hakha Rih Lake Mindat Siallum Fort

- Flag

- Location of Chin State in Myanmar
- Coordinates: 22°0′N 93°30′E
- Country: Myanmar
- Region: Upper
- Before becoming State: Part of Chin Special Division and Arakan Division
- Establishment: 3 January 1974
- Capital: Hakha

Government
  - Chief Minister: Vung Suan Thang
  - Cabinet: Chin State Government
  - Legislature: Chin State Hluttaw
  - Judiciary: Chin State High Court

Area
  - Total: 36,018.8 km^{2} (13,906.9 sq mi)
  - Rank: 9th
- Highest elevation (Nat Ma Taung): 3,070 m (10,070 ft)

Population (2014)
  - Total: 478,801
  - Rank: 14th
  - Density: 13.2931/km^{2} (34.4289/sq mi)

Demographics
  - Ethnicities: Chin, Falam, Laimi, Bamar, Mizo, Kuki, Zomi, Zotung, Zo, Rakhine, Tedim, Asho, Cho, Mro, Daai, Khumi
  - Religions: Christianity: 85.4% Buddhism: 13.0% Animism: 0.4% Islam: 0.1% other religions: 1.1%
- Time zone: UTC+06:30 (MST)
- HDI (2015): 0.556 medium · 7th
- Website: chinstate.gov.mm

Chin State (Burmese: ချင်းပြည်နယ်, MLCTS: hkyang: pranynai, pronounced [tɕʰɪ́ɰ̃ pjìnɛ̀]) is a state in Northwestern Myanmar (Burma). Chin State is bordered by Sagaing Region and Magway Region to the east, Rakhine State to the south, the Chattogram Division of Bangladesh to the west, and the Indian states of Mizoram to the west and Manipur to the north. The population of Chin State is 488,801 according to the 2014 census, and its capital city is Hakha. It is divided into 6 districts and 9 main townships.

The state is named after the Chin people, a collective term encompassing numerous tribes native to Chin State and the neighboring regions. It is the only state in Myanmar with a Christian-majority population. Located in the Chin Hills, much of the state is mountainous and sparsely populated, with few transportation links and low levels of economic development. It also has Myanmar's highest poverty rate, at 58%, according to a 2017 report.

== History ==
=== Early history ===
Chin State was traditionally autonomous and far from its neighboring powers, like the Burman kingdoms in the east and Indian states in the west. Until the British advancement in the region, independent city-states such as Ciimnuai (Chinwe/Chin Nwe) later shifted to Tedim and Vangteh in the north, Tlaisun (also recorded as Tashon) and Rallang in the mid-land, and Hakha, Thantlang and Zokhua (Yokwa) in the south played important political roles in securing peace of the region, and each city-state practised its own independent sovereignty in its own rights.

Traditionally, the people of Chin State practiced indigenous belief systems often described as animism. Catholic and Protestant missionaries first arrived in the late 1800s and converted Chin peoples throughout the following century.

=== 1900–present ===
Upon Burma's independence from the United Kingdom in 1948, the Chin Hills Special Division was created, with its capital at Falam. Hakha later became the capital. However, three townships that are today part of present-day Chin State (Mindat, Kanpetlet and Matupi) were previously part of the Pakokku Hill Tracts of Pakokku District and Paletwa Township of the Arakan Hill Tracts, until 4 January 1974. On this date, the Chin Hills Special Division was granted state status and became Chin State.

"Chin National Day" is designated on 20 February to commemorate the "General Assembly of Chinland" held in 1948. The first celebration of Chin National Day was held in 1951, but it was not recognized by the Myanmar government until the 2010s.

From 2007 to 2009, Chin State was affected by Mautam, a cyclic ecological phenomenon triggered by a bamboo masting event. In Thantlang Township, rodents began attacking rice crops in October 2007, while the first outbreak in Paletwa Township was reported in September 2007. By the end of that year, 30 villages in southern Paletwa had been affected, while a further 77 villages in northern Paletwa were impacted in 2008. Hmawlzauk village in Falam Township had 100% of maize crops damaged. The event increased malnutrition levels for Chin residents.

==== Myanmar civil war ====
Chin State, like much of Myanmar, has been deeply affected by the Myanmar civil war since it broke out in 2021. Tens of thousands of Chin State residents have fled to neighboring Mizoram, India, and towns such as Thantlang and Nakzang have been destroyed. Since the war broke out, several armed opposition groups have emerged calling themselves the Chinland Defense Force. The groups are reportedly funded by the Chin diaspora and by the National Unity Government of Myanmar, an opposition government-in-exile.

On 6 December 2023, the Chin National Front adopted a Chinland Constitution, proclaiming the state of Chinland. But resistance groups from 5 townships (Falam, Kanpetlet, Matupi, Mindat, and Tedim) out of 9 townships in Chin State objected to this constitution.

As of November 2025, ethnic Chin resistance forces, such as the Chin National Army and the Chin National Defence Force, maintain de facto control over approximately 80 percent of Chin State, encompassing most of its townships. Ongoing conflict has displaced 160,000 people—about one third of Chin State's population—either internally or across the Indian border.

== Administrative divisions ==
Townships of Chin State, 2022

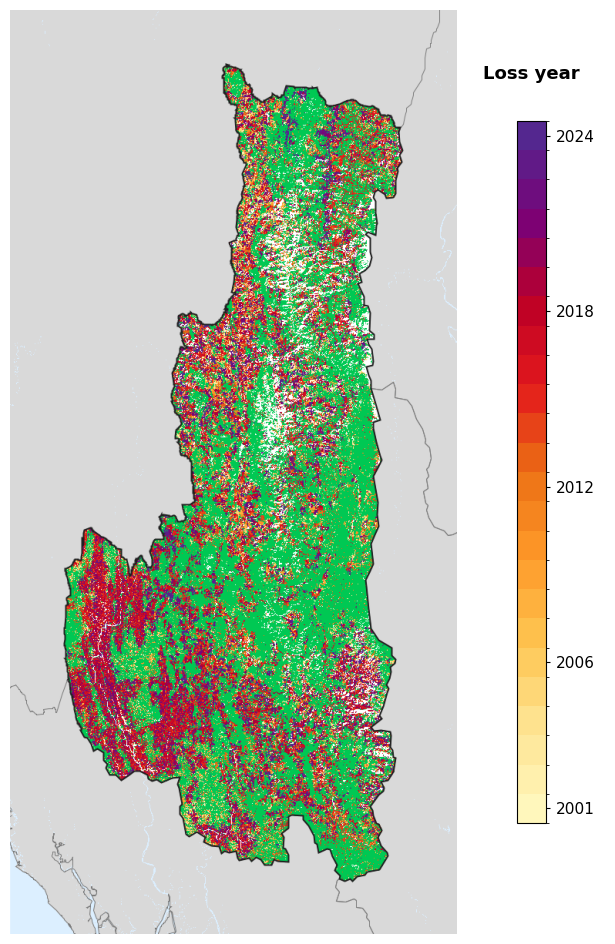
Tree-cover loss year in Chin State, 2001-2024, from the Global Forest Change dataset.

- Falam District Northern Chin State
  - Falam Township
  - Tedim Township
  - Tonzang Township
- Hakha District of Central Chin State
  - Hakha Township
  - Thantlang Township
- Matupi District of Central and Southwestern Chin State
  - Matupi Township
  - Rezua Sub-township
  - Paletwa Township
- Mindat District of Southeastern Chin State
  - Mindat Township
  - Kanpetlet Township

Hakha District was formed by the first Chin State Hluttaw emergency meeting No. 2 on 1 June. Matupi District was formed by the second Pyidaungsu Hluttaw regular meeting on 28 June 2017.

== Government ==
=== Executive ===
The Chin State Government is the executive government of Chin State, led by Dr Vung Suan Thang. It became defunct following the 2021 Myanmar coup but was re-established on 10 April 2026. Before the Chin State Government resumed its duties, Chin State was administrated by the State Administration Council (SAC).

=== Legislature ===
The Chin State Hluttaw is the legislature of Chin State, responsible for local governance, passing state laws, approving localized budgets, and overseeing the state cabinet. It has 24 seats and is unicameral.

== Economy ==
Chin State has little infrastructure and remains undeveloped, with over 70% of its population living below the poverty line.

Agriculture is a key source of income and part of the daily livelihood for many residents of Chin State. Most people rely on rotational, slash-and-burn farming, growing just enough to feed themselves and their families. Rice, maize, and millet are the primary crops grown in Chin State. Chin households are moving towards a cash-oriented economy based on vegetables and perennial crops (i.e., coffee, avocado, grapes, elephant foot yam, tree bean, and sericulture). Some earn a living as traders, selling cattle and other goods across the border in Mizoram, India.

Chin State is Myanmar's largest producer of konjac (elephant foot yam) with an estimated annual output exceeding 250,000 tonnes.

== Healthcare ==
Healthcare and medical resources in Chin State are limited. According to UNICEF, one in 10 children will not reach the age of five. In 2015, 41% of children in the state were affected by child stunting, the highest prevalence recorded in Myanmar. Human rights abuses are correlated with poorer health outcomes among Chin residents.

== Demographics ==
Historical population
Year	Pop.	±%
1973	323,295	—
1983	368,949	+14.1%
2014	478,801	+29.8%
Source: 2014 Myanmar Census

=== Ethnic makeup ===
Ethnic composition of Chin State
Ethnic group	Percentage
Chin	95.7%
Rakhine	3.4%
Bamar	0.8%
Other	0.1%
Source: 2019 GAD township reports

The Chin peoples make up the majority of Chin State's population, with small Rakhine and Bamar minorities. The people of Chin State are made up of many tribes, which, though historically related, now speak divergent languages and have different cultural identities. Some consider the name Chin an exonym, given by the Bamar people. Chin tribes in the state include the Zo, Zomi, Zotung, Laimi, K'Cho, Khumi, Daai, and Asho.

After the 2014 Myanmar census, the Burmese government indefinitely withheld the release of detailed ethnicity data, citing concerns about political and social concerns surrounding the issue of ethnicity in Myanmar. In 2022, researchers published an analysis of the General Administration Department's nationwide 2018-2019 township reports to tabulate the ethnic makeup of Chin State.

As of February 2024, United Nations estimates 60,000 Chin people have fled to the Indian states of Mizoram and Manipur, while another 61,000 remain internally displaced following the 2021 Myanmar coup d'état. Chin humanitarian organizations suggest that the real figures are higher.

=== Religion ===
Religion in Chin (2014)
1. Christianity (85.4%)
2. Buddhism (13.0%)
3. Tribal (Animism) (0.40%)
4. Hinduism (0.02%)
5. Islam (0.10%)
6. Others (1.10%)

According to the 2014 Myanmar census, Christians make up the vast majority of Chin State's population, at 85.4%. Minority religious communities include Buddhists (13.0%), Animists (0.4%), Muslims (0.1%), Hindus (0.02%), and other religions (1.1%), including adherents of Pau Cin Hau, who collectively comprise the remainder of Chin State's population. 74 people listed no religion or were otherwise not enumerated. A small portion of the population practices Judaism, specifically Bnei Menashe. Chin State is the only state in Myanmar with a majority Christian population.

Religious group	Population % 1983	Population % 2014
Christianity	72.7%	85.4%
Buddhism	10.8%	13.0%
Tribal	14.2%	0.4%
Others	2.2%	1.1%
Hinduism	0.0%	0.02%
Islam	0.1%	0.1%

== Education ==
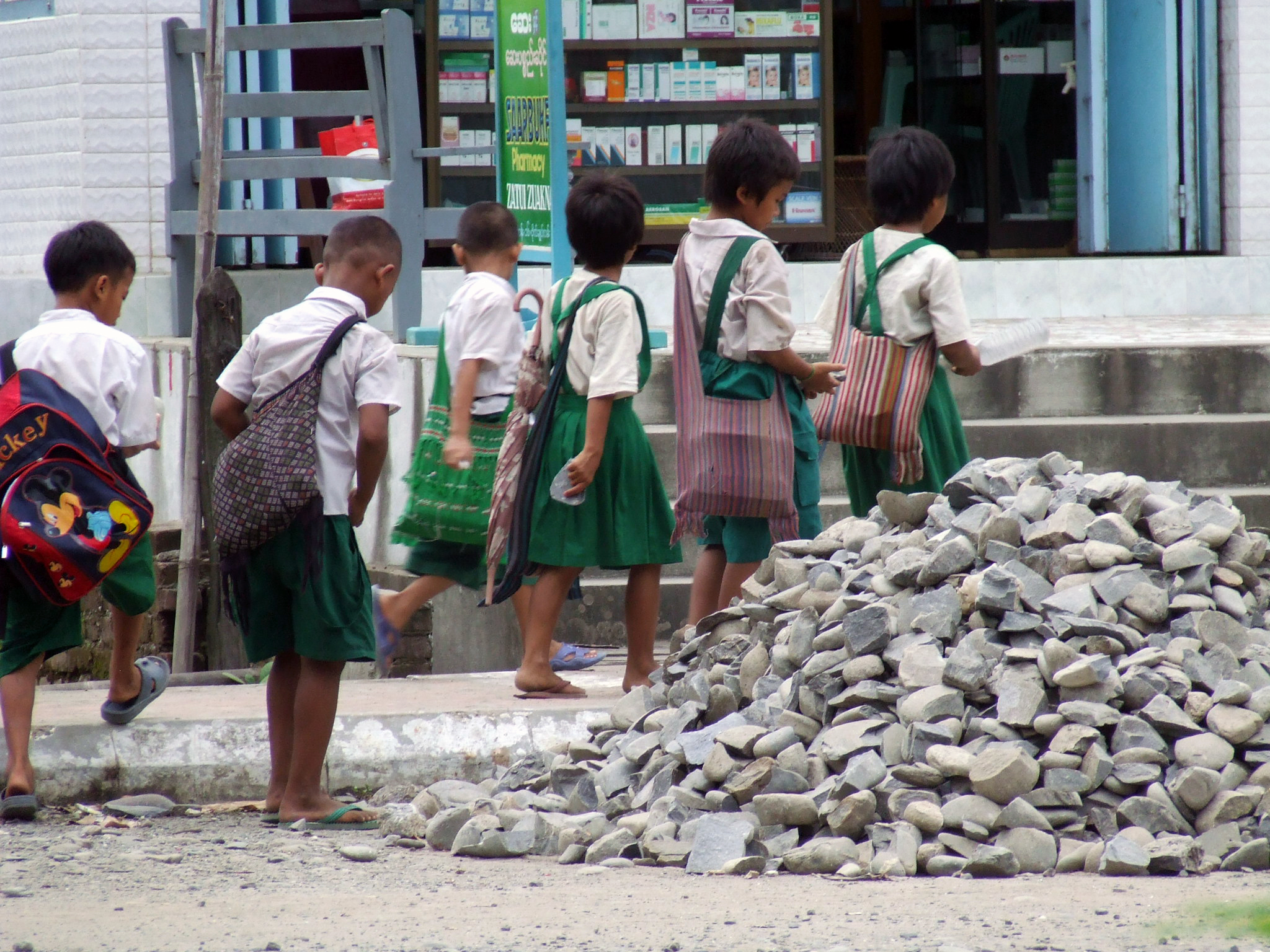
Students in Hakha

Education in Chin State faces significant challenges. Schools often lack a sufficient amount of textbooks, whiteboards, markers, pencils, tables, and chairs. Since the 1990s, teaching Chin languages as a separate subject has been banned in primary schools. According to Health&Hope, only ~5.5% of youths in Chin State will make it through school to pass their grade 10 exams. In 2003, official statistics indicated that Chin State had 25 high schools; most rural villages have no high school of their own.

- Bethel Bible College in Tedim Township
- Chin Christian College in Hakha Township
- Zomi Theological College in Falam, Falam Township

== Sources ==
- Carey, B. S.; Tuck, H. N. (2018). The Chin Hills, Vol. 1: A History of the People, Our Dealings With Them, Their Customs and Manners, and a Gazetteer of Their Country (Classic Reprint). Vol. 1. Forgotten Books. ISBN 978-1-333-92780-6.
- Hock, Hans Henrich (2021). The Languages and Linguistics of Mainland Southeast Asia. Vol. 8. De Gruyter Brill. doi:10.1515/9783110558142-019. Archived from the original on 6 April 2026.
- Dua, Bawi (2019). "A Reinterpretation of Chin Christian Spirituality Beyond One Century in the Light Of Martin Luther's Freedom Of a Christian". Master of Theology Theses.
- Son, Biana (2007). Conversion of the Chin in Burma: The Creation of an Elite. University of Amsterdam.
- Sollom, Richard; Richards, Adam K.; Parmar, Parveen; Mullany, Luke C.; Lian, Salai Bawi; Iacopino, Vincent; Beyrer, Chris (2011). "Health and human rights in Chin State, Western Burma: a population-based assessment using multistaged household cluster sampling". PLOS Medicine. 8 (2) e1001007. doi:10.1371/journal.pmed.1001007. PMC 3035608. PMID 21346799.
- Pau, Pum Khan (2020). Indo-Burma Frontier and the Making of the Chin Hills. London: Routeledge. ISBN 978-0-429-32470-3.
- Singleton, Grant R.; Belmain, Steve R.; Brown, Peter R.; Hardy, Bill (2010). Rodent Outbreaks: Ecology and Impacts. IRRI. ISBN 978-971-22-0257-5.
- Bonnerjee, Aniruddha (2017). "Piloting social protection in Chin State, Myanmar: Challenges and opportunities within a context of fragility". Global Social Policy. 17 (3): 375–380. doi:10.1177/1468018117729912.
- Yamahata, Chosein; Takeda, Makiko (2023). Myanmar's Changing Political Landscape. Springer Nature Singapore. ISBN 978-981-19-9357-2.
- Waronker, Jay A (2017). The Synagogues of India: Architecture, History, and Communities.
