= Shö language =

Sino-Tibetan language spoken in Myanmar, Bangladesh and India

Shö
- Native to: Myanmar, Bangladesh
- Ethnicity: Asho Chin; Khyang (in Bangladesh)
- Native speakers: 180,000 (2024)
- Language family: Sino-Tibetan: Tibeto-Burman; Central Tibeto-Burman (?); Kuki-Chin–Naga; Kuki-Chin; Southern; Shö
- Writing system: Mon-Burmese and Latin script in Myanmar; Bengali-Assamese script in Bangladesh

Language codes
- ISO 639-3: csh – Asho Chin
- Glottolog: asho1236 Asho Chin

Shö, or Asho, is a Kuki-Chin language of Myanmar, with a few thousand speakers in Bangladesh. This language is known as Asho Khyang in Bangladesh.

A written script was developed by Rev. Lyman Stilson in 1842.

== Geographical distribution ==
Asho is spoken in Ayeyarwady Region, Bago Region, and Magway Region, and Rakhine State, Myanmar. VanBik (2009:38) lists the following Asho dialects.

- Settu (spoken from Sittwe to Thandwe — mostly Sittwe to Ann)
- Laitu (spoken in Minbya and Myepon townships, Rakhine state)
- Awttu (spoken in Mindon Township)
- Kowntu (spoken in Ngaphe, Minhla, Minbu)
- Kaitu (spoken in Pegu, Mandalay, Magway)
- Läoktu (spoken in Myepone, Kyauk Phyu, Ann)

== Phonology ==
Asho (K'Chò) has 26 to 30 consonants and ten to eleven vowels depending on the dialect.

Asho consonant phonemes in the Hill dialect
		Labial	Dental/ Alveolar	Palatal	Velar	Glottal	
		Labial	Dental/ Alveolar	Palatal	Velar	-v	+v
Plosive	plain	p	t̪		k	ʔ	
Plosive	aspirated	pʰ	t̪ʰ		kʰ		
Plosive	implosive	ɓ	ɗ				
Nasal	voiced	m	n	ɲ	ŋ		
Nasal	voiceless	m̥	n̥	ɲ̊	ŋ̊		
Fricative	plain		s	ʃ		h	ɦ
Fricative	aspirated		sʰ				
Fricative	lateral		ɬ				
Approximant		w	l	j			

- Voiced plosives /b d ɡ z/ are only heard in the Plains dialect.
- In the Plains dialect, dental plosives /t̪ t̪ʰ/ are pronounced as alveolar [t tʰ], along with /d/ being only alveolar.
- Velar plosives /k kʰ/ may be palatalized as affricates [tʃ tʃʰ] before front vowels.
- In some dialects a voiceless [j̊] is heard in place of /ʃ/.
- /j/ may also be heard as a fricative [ʒ] in free variation among dialects.

Vowels
	Front		Central	Back	
Close	i / ˠi		ʉ	u	
Near-close	ɪ	ʏ		ʊ	
Close-mid	e		(ə̆)	ɤ	o
Open-mid	ɛ			ɔ	
Open			a		

Diphthongs: ei, ai, au

- Sounds /ʏ ʉ/ only occur in the Hill dialect. In the Plains dialect, /ʊ u/ is heard in place of /ʏ ʉ/.
- A shortened [ə̆] is heard in unstressed syllables.
- /ɤ/ can sometimes be heard as more central [ɘ].
- A prevelarized /ˠi/ occurs in the Plains dialect.

== Morphology ==
Similar to other Kukish languages, many Asho verbs have two distinct stems. This stem alternation is a Proto-Kukish feature, which has been retained to different degrees in different Kukish languages.
