= Chin National Day =

Holiday observed by the Chin people

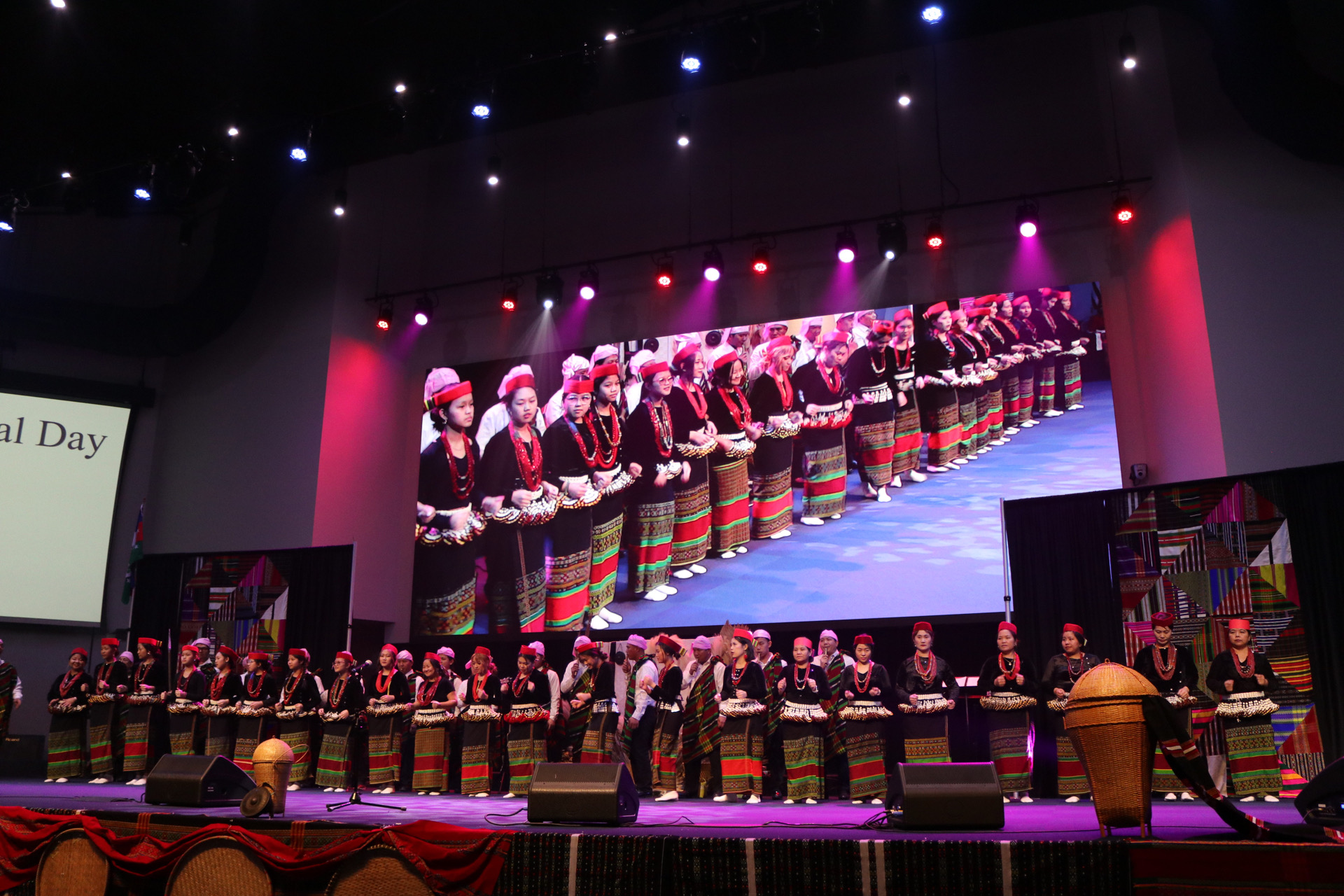
- 75th Chin National Day celebration by Chin Community of Indiana
- Official name: ချင်းပြည်နယ်နေ့
- Observed by: Chin people
- Date: February 20
- Frequency: Annual
- First time: 1951; 75 years ago
- Started by: Chin National Organization

Chin National Day (Burmese: ချင်းပြည်နယ်နေ့; abbreviated: CND) is observed annually on February 20 by the Chin people of Myanmar. It commemorates the abolition of the traditional hereditary chieftainship system and the adoption of a democratic form of governance in the Chin Hills region in 1948.

== History ==
February 20 is commemorated by the Chin people as Chin National Day. On this day in 1948, over 500 Chin representatives from across Chin State gathered at the Chin National Conference, where they voted to replace the traditional feudal system with a modern democratic form of governance. This historic decision led to the establishment of February 20 as Chin National Day. Today, the occasion is celebrated by Chin communities around the world, representing 53 ethnic groups, as one of their most significant cultural events.

The first celebration of Chin National Day took place from February 20 to 22, 1951, in Mindat, Chin State. The event was attended by Prime Minister U Nu and other dignitaries, including members of the Union of Burma's cabinet. Messages of congratulations were received from the President and various ministers of the Union.

During the parliamentary democracy period (1948–1962), Chin National Day was recognized as a national holiday. However, following the 1962 military coup led by General Ne Win, the Revolutionary Council annulled its status as a national holiday. In 1966, attempts were made to rename the day as "Chin Special Division Day," but the Chin Affairs Council reaffirmed the original designation in 1967.

In 2026, Hakha residents boycotted the local CND celebration due to the attendance of Myanmar military officials.

== Ceremony ==
Cultural dances are an integral part of this festival. Performances include the Sarlamkai, the Rallu Lam, associated with the Lushei community and the Khuang Cawi, a ceremonial activity involving the lifting of a decorative bamboo structure, particularly notable in Hakha and Thantlang tribe are held.

Fashion shows and beauty pageants are also organized, showcasing traditional Chin attire and celebrating the diversity of Chin tribes.

Traditional foods are prepared and shared during the celebrations. Sabuti, a hominy corn soup often served with fried beef, lime, and chili salad, is a staple dish. Another common food is Chang, a type of rice cake.

== See also ==
- List of Burmese traditional festivals

== Sources ==
- Sakhong, Lian H. (2003). In Search of Chin Identity: A study in Religion, Politics and Ethnic Identity in Burma (PDF). Denmark: NIAS Press. ISBN 87-91114-15-2.
