= Asho Chin people =

Tribe of the Chin people

Asho
အရှိုချင်း

Total population
- 250,000

Regions with significant populations
- Burma: Rakhine State, Magway Region, Pegu, Irrawaddy
- China: ~100-200

Languages
- Asho Chin language

Religion
- Theravada Buddhism; Christianity; animism

Related ethnic groups
- Khyang people, Chin peoples

The Asho people (Burmese: အရှိုချင်း) are one of the tribes of the Chin peoples. Also known as the Plains Chin (မြေပြန့်ချင်း), the Asho Chin live in the lowland plains of southwestern Myanmar spanning the lower Irrawaddy River basin and the southern parts of the Arakan Mountains, unlike other Chin peoples, who occupy the country's highlands. The total population of the Asho people is around 400,000.

== History ==
The Asho believe their ancestors first settled the areas west of the confluence of the Ayeyarwady and Chindwin Rivers. During the Pagan kingdom, they moved eastward, intermingling wih Burmese speakers, and living in close proximity with the Khami for two centuries before separating into two subgroups. The Asho were the first Chin peoples that Burmese speakers made contact with; their word for person "khlaung" was broadly adopted as the Burmese exonym for the Chin peoples. Their ethnonym is Asho.

== Language ==
Asho language is spoken by approximately 174,000 speakers (2022), with at least two dialects - the Hill dialect spoken in the Chittagong Hill Tracts, and the Plains dialect, spoken in the south. The Plains dialect has undergone significant phonological, lexical, and grammatical influence from Burmese due to extensive language contact.

The Asho are bilingual in Burmese.

Asho is written using a variant of the Pwo Karen script, which itself is derived from the Mon–Burmese script. Rev. G. Whitehead of Anglican Society for the Propagation of the Gospel introduced the Latin script for writing Asho.

== Religion and culture ==
Unlike other Chin tribes who are predominantly Christian, approximately 60% of the Asho Chin are Theravada Buddhists, while 15% are Christians, and the remainder continue practicing animism.

Every year, the Asho people celebrate the beginning harvest with 'suan tha ei pwei' (transl. eating early rice festival) in memory of Sahaik Nu, an old Asho woman who was once strongly attached to her sons and daughters-in-law. According to folklore, her ghost ordered her children to host a celebration with dancing at the beginning harvest and said an offering of rice would double the next year's harvest.
