= Chin Rising =

Anti-British revolt by Chin chiefs (1890–1896)

Chin Resistance Movement
Date	1890–1896
Location	Chin Hills
Result	British victory Pacification of Chin Hills

Belligerents
British Raj	Chin chiefs

The Chin Rising was a conflict between the British Empire and the Chin chiefs of the Chin Hills, a mountainous region on the frontier between British Burma and Manipur inhabited by numerous small, independent Chin chieftaincies. It was fought from 1890 to 1896, following the British annexation of the Chin Hills after the Chin-Lushai Expedition brought the region under British control for the first time. Several Chin tribes at different points resisted British rule, taxation, and disarmament, but were eventually pacified and disarmed.

== Background ==
Following the termination of the Chin-Lushai Expedition in April 1890, a British military campaign launched to suppress Chin and Lushai raids into the plains of Burma and Assam, Charles Crosthwaite noted that operations should no longer take the form of a massive expedition, but should rather focus on reconciliation with the tribes to reduce the expenditure of annexation. The Chin Hills were annexed, and two administrative units were proclaimed. The Northern Chin Hills, consisting of the Sukte, Kam Hau, and Sizang, was established under Bertram S Carey at Fort White. The Southern Chin Hills, consisting of Taisun, Haka (Lai) and independent tribes, was established under David Ross at Haka. A special allowance of ₹200 was established for the political officers. Falam was made the capital of the civil administration of the Chin Hills. Kan was linked with Haka and Fort Tregear, linking up the Lushai Hills with the Chin Hills.

== Pacification ==
=== Sizang submission ===
Bertram S Carey went on furlough (extended leave), and Captain Frank Montagu Rundall, with Brigadier General Sir George Wolseley, held a durbar (a formal assembly held with local chiefs) with the Sizang chiefs. The Sizang chiefs took an oath of submission and friendship to the British Government, promising to surrender all slaves, halt all raiding into the plains, and cease cutting telegraph wires. A total of 17 Burman captives were released, with Rundall releasing two Sizang telegraph cutters in good faith. This agreement completed the Sizang submission, which had begun in January 1890.

=== Kam Hau resistance ===
With the submission of the Sizangs, the Kam Hau Sukte were considered for negotiation. They had held out in resistance with the Sizangs during the Chin-Lushai Expedition. Captain Rundall tried to get in touch with the Kam Hau chiefs such as Khaw Cin of Kam Hau, Do Thawng of Mualbem, and other Gungal village headmen. Do Thawng had escaped in January during the expedition and was trying to build a new village in Taisun territory with his loyal subjects. Khaw Cin had died in early September. This complicated matters as the Kam Hau were now split into two factions. One was led by Za Tual and another by Za Tual's nephew, Hau Cin Khup. Hau Cin Khup was an 18-year-old chief with little influence, so Rundall opened talks with Za Tual. He succeeded in establishing good relations with Za Tual's immediate family, but did not secure the submission of the whole clan. The Kam Hau began to raid villages in the Kalay and Kabaw valleys, killing and capturing subjects. The British launched an expedition against the Kam Hau for 1891. The military shifted its base of operations from Fort White to the Letha range. Captain Rundall organised a large column and moved into the main village of the Kam Hau known as Tedim. Negotiation with Hau Cin Khup failed. Rundall recorded the meeting with Hau Cin Khup. Rundall had explained to Hau Cin Khup that he had not cooperated when the submission terms were as small as those for Za Tual. Hau Cin Khup had raided villages four times, and thus the submission terms were expanded. Hau Cin Khup attempted a bargain but was given an ultimatum.

Hau Cin Khup made no response to the ultimatum. His house had been burnt on a rumour of British advancement, so he fled to Manipur. On 14 February 1891, Rundall entered Hau Cin Khup's village of Tonzang to wait for his surrender. During his stay, he fined the villagers of Mualpi for their raid on Pinthwa. Hau Cin Khup failed to release the captives and surrender by 23 February 1891. Rundall surrounded the village at 4am and stormed the village while they put up a strong defence. The shootout continued for some time. When the Kam Hau learnt that Rundall was considering shelling the village and advancing the whole column, the three chiefs, Hau Cin Khup, Tan Khup Hau, and Ngienzathung, came out and surrendered. Thirty-nine captives were surrendered, and Rundall returned to Fort White with 100 men of the 39 Garhwalis at Tedim. Maun Tun Win took the Kam Hau chiefs to visit Rangoon and Mandalay in April. When the chiefs returned, Captain Hugh Rose succeeded Rundall and summoned a durbar at Fort White on 13 June 1891. A treaty was signed between Rose and Hau Cin Khup, who was reappointed to rule the Kam Hau tract, in a ceremony that involved the killing of a mithun (a domesticated bovine considered a symbol of wealth and status). The Kam Hau swore to abstain from raiding in Burma in exchange for taxation rights over their own people. Hau Cin Khup thus became a British ally.

=== Haka Resistance ===
Political officer D. Ross, who was mediating the Haka-Zokhua feud, successfully established good relations with both parties. However, the Thetta villagers were difficult to cooperate with, as they refused to surrender their captives despite being prepared to submit. A series of outrages took place on the Kan-Haka road in December 1890, and Thetta openly defied the British. On 10 January, 135 rifles were advanced to Thetta. They opposed the column, and the attempted overrun was pushed back. Despite this, the chiefs still surrendered. Ross accepted the outcome and travelled to Haka. In March, Ross revisited Falam and held a durbar. The Taisuns were given the responsibility of contacting the Gungals in the north to free their captives. The Haka column, however, set their target on Thantlang after an ambush on the column. The Thantlang chief Za Huat (Yahwit) was fined ₹5,000 to be paid to the British in Haka. An ultimatum was further made to surrender the chiefs Laluai and Jozway, who had attacked the column before. The Thantlang failed to uphold the obligations. On 2 May 1891, 300 rifles were sent to Thantlang, destroying it and taking Za Huat's son as hostage.

The onset of rain halted further military operations. On 12 October 1891, the southern chiefs were taken to Rangoon to show British might and development. The chiefs were Van Shan and Shn Byit of Thettas, Yan Reng and Ni Kway of Haka and Thantlang, and two chiefs from Kapi. A durbar was held at the Government House with Sir Alexander Mackenzie. Mackenzie explained how "helpless" the Chins were in the face of British power when leaving their hills. He explained the sovereignty of Queen Victoria over India and Burma, and that they were subjects of hers and had to obey British officers.

=== Post-Annexation ===
The slave issue was resolved with 190 slaves released. The Sizang freed 88 slaves; the Kam Hau freed 32; the Thahdo and Guite both freed 11. The Zahau and Hualngo freed 36, and the Gungal Sukte surrendered 20 captives. However, the military did not declare pacification to be over. The truce with the Thantlang and Thetta tribes was unstable. While they did not resist large columns, they were known to turn on smaller forces. The British were instructed to carry out four terms in the post-annexation era. Tracts made by Chins were to be maintained by Chins with small subsidies. Villages were tasked with maintaining bridges that had been burnt out by jungle fires. Coolie labour was to be made compulsory, and all tribes were to disarm and surrender their guns. Disarmament became an anxious policy as it was needed for pacification.

Due to this, in 1892, the Gungal Sukte and Sizangs committed several outrages on the lines of communication. On the fourth of May, a column was opposed by the Gungal-Sukte and the Hualngo outside the Manipur River crossing. Two days following this, Thuam Thawng, Chief of Kaptel, invaded the military post at Botung. However, it was overpowered, and Kaptel was disarmed along with neighbouring villages. The disarmament policy clashed with the traditional society of the Chins. In Chin society, the three most important possessions were corrugated iron sheets, a house made of teak, and a gun. Guns were so entrenched in Chin society that the disarmament policy backfired. Thuam Thawng, in 1891, convened councils of chiefs to resist the British and prevent disarmament. Chief Khai Kam was convinced. The hostility was not to begin until the harvesting season was over. Messengers were sent to persuade the chiefs to join the uprising. The first step of the plan was to remove the political officers and the interpreters, local guides, and translators who guided the troops. They laid a trap for the political officer. On 21 September, Carey reported that Fowler sent a telegram stating that the Lushai and Zahau had gathered at Kaptel, intending to cause trouble. Carey dismissed this and believed the Gungal Sukte were assessing their ability to surrender in order to continue resisting the British. He wished to avoid an expensive punitive expedition that year and preferred to grant generous terms of surrender. Thuam Thawng sent a message to Fort White to repent for his past mistakes and invited Carey to meet him, where he would pay a fine and take an oath of submission.

Carey believed that Thuam Thawng's surrender would be followed by the surrender of more chiefs. He sent Myook Maung Tun (a Burmese township officer) to Fort White to manage the negotiations rather than Fowler, since he knew Thuam Thawng personally and spoke his language. A meeting was set up at Pumva, a friendly village, on 8 October. Preparation to confront the Myook was under way as 500 Gungal Sukte crossed the river and joined with the Sizangs on 5–6 October. They lay in wait on 9 October to ambush Maung Tun's column. Maung Tun left Fort White with his column to Pumva. They crossed the site of the old Fort White safely. As they entered a narrow shrub jungle path, volleys of Chins began to shoot at them from both flanks. The escort of the column was mostly shot down before the main column returned fire. The commanding havildar (a non-commissioned officer rank in the Indian Army) evacuated the column from the path into the open field. The dead bodies were stripped and mutilated while the remaining column held the ground for six hours. The escort was relieved at 4pm, and the wounded were recovered. Carey, upon hearing of the ambush, alerted all military outposts. He ordered the highlands to be patrolled to remind them of the British presence. Carey went to Nashwin the next day to learn more about the rising, but was fired at with bullets from the Chins. However, he managed to make communication and instructed them to ascertain guilty and innocent villages. Innocent villages who did not ambush Maung Tun were to report to Fort White, and a few did.

News of gunfire at Tedim was also communicated. Carey left for Tedim on the 14th and summoned the Kam Hau and Sukte. Hau Cin Khup, the Kam Hau chief, and several Sukte headmen assured friendship with the British and maintained their allegiance. The uprising was thus confined to a majority of Gungal-Sukte villages and Sizang tribes. The Sahiling and Buanman clans of the Sizang, two Gungal villages, and a few Sukte remained neutral. Carey stated that the reason for the uprising was the fear of general disarmament. The rebels had hoped to drive the British from the Chin Hills using guerrilla tactics of cutting communication, picking off convoys, blocking and destroying roads, and harassing the British. The counter-operation was thus formulated by Carey. The large columns would destroy the rebels and leave behind garrisons in centres of cultivation. The garrisons would pursue rebels and not allow them to rest, recuperate, or reorganise themselves. These garrisons would also confiscate food such as livestock and grain, and starve the rebels into submission.

On 5 November, Dimlo was destroyed, followed by Sumpi. On the 10th, Thangnuai was burnt, and a Sizang-Sukte attack was repulsed. Following this, large columns fought against the Pimpi. The Pimpi attack was followed by attacks on Montol and Tanya, and on 20 November, the column returned to Fort White. Due to widespread opposition, Brigadier General Sir Arthur Power Palmer arrived on the 28th to personally conduct operations. Palmer considered placing military posts throughout the hills to prevent cultivation and destroy all stores of food until all guns were surrendered. However, his scheme was not accepted in its entirety by the Commissioner. The expedition was extended, and by December, all principal Sizang villages were destroyed. Movement against the Gungal was stopped due to flooding of the Manipur River. In early January 1893, Palmer moved against the Gungal villages. On 12 January 1892, the troops crossed the Manipur River and advanced towards Kaptel against Chief Thuam Thawng. The village was burnt before the column arrived, and was occupied in peace. Villages were still ordered to clear 50 yards of jungle and undergrowth to prevent ambush cover. They were further ordered to surrender rifles. While the column engaged with the Gungals, the outposts of the Sizang tract succeeded in surprising rebel camps, burning grain, and capturing livestock. In February, villages friendly to Carey turned hostile once more. The villages of Sakhiling, Dakbong, Mualbem, Voklak, and Narpi rebelled. The garrisons at the villages thus prevented any cultivation from happening and arrested all cultivators or fired on them.

Due to the food blockade and prevention of cultivation, the rebel Chins began to steal cattle from the Burmese in the valley, such as Kalemyo. On 8 March, Carey convened the Sizangs at Fort White and warned them to surrender the rebel leaders and hand over hostages. Compensation was demanded, along with an order for the villages to regroup into larger settlements. A total of 18 villages were regrouped into seven large villages. This allowed the British to control the tribes.

The following chiefs were captured and deported to Burma:

- Gungal Suktes
- Thuam Thawng - Chief of Kaptel
- Pau dal - son of Thuam Thawng
- Kanhaw - Chief of Helei
- Benar - headman of Muizawl
- Katwerl - Outlaw of Kaptel
- Sizang
- Kam Lung - Chief of Thulkai clan
- Do Lian, Chief of Siallum
- Khan Cin - Brother of Do Lian
- Tun Ngo

Carey met the Kam Hau chief Hau Cin Khup to discuss disarmament. All tribes had now submitted, with the exception of Baungshe and Thantlang, who broke their oaths and harboured outlaws. Carey thus heavily fined them in guns. The old tribute system was removed with a standardised currency of ₹1 per year. With the end of the season, Carey took 49 chiefs to Burma, where Lord Lansdowne was to come for a meeting. Lansdowne presented ten chiefs with silver, but a cholera outbreak in Rangoon led to the death of eight chiefs, which led to some discontent in the Chin Hills. During this meeting with Viceroy Lansdowne, an expedition was sanctioned to subdue the remaining Sizang rebels called the Pimpih rebels.

The expedition, which the British termed the "final pacification", was commenced on 21 December 1893. Carey captured the Sukte chief Do Thawng in order to induce his subjects to fight the Sizang Pimpih rebels. Cultivation in the Sizang tract was stopped, and villages were heavily patrolled with large fines. The closure of trade and cultivation induced the Sizangs to surrender, and on 16 May, the chiefs Khup Pau, Khai Kam, and Mang Pum surrendered their guns. Carey considered Khai Kam to be dangerously influential, but instead of hanging him, sent him to Port Blair in the Andaman Islands. The Sizang rebels were thus all pacified.

== Sources ==
- Pau, Pum Khan (2020). Indo-Burma Frontier and the Making of the Chin Hills. London: Routeledge. ISBN 978-0-429-32470-3.
