= Siallum Fort =

Historical site in Chin State, Myanmar

- Chin State, Myanmar
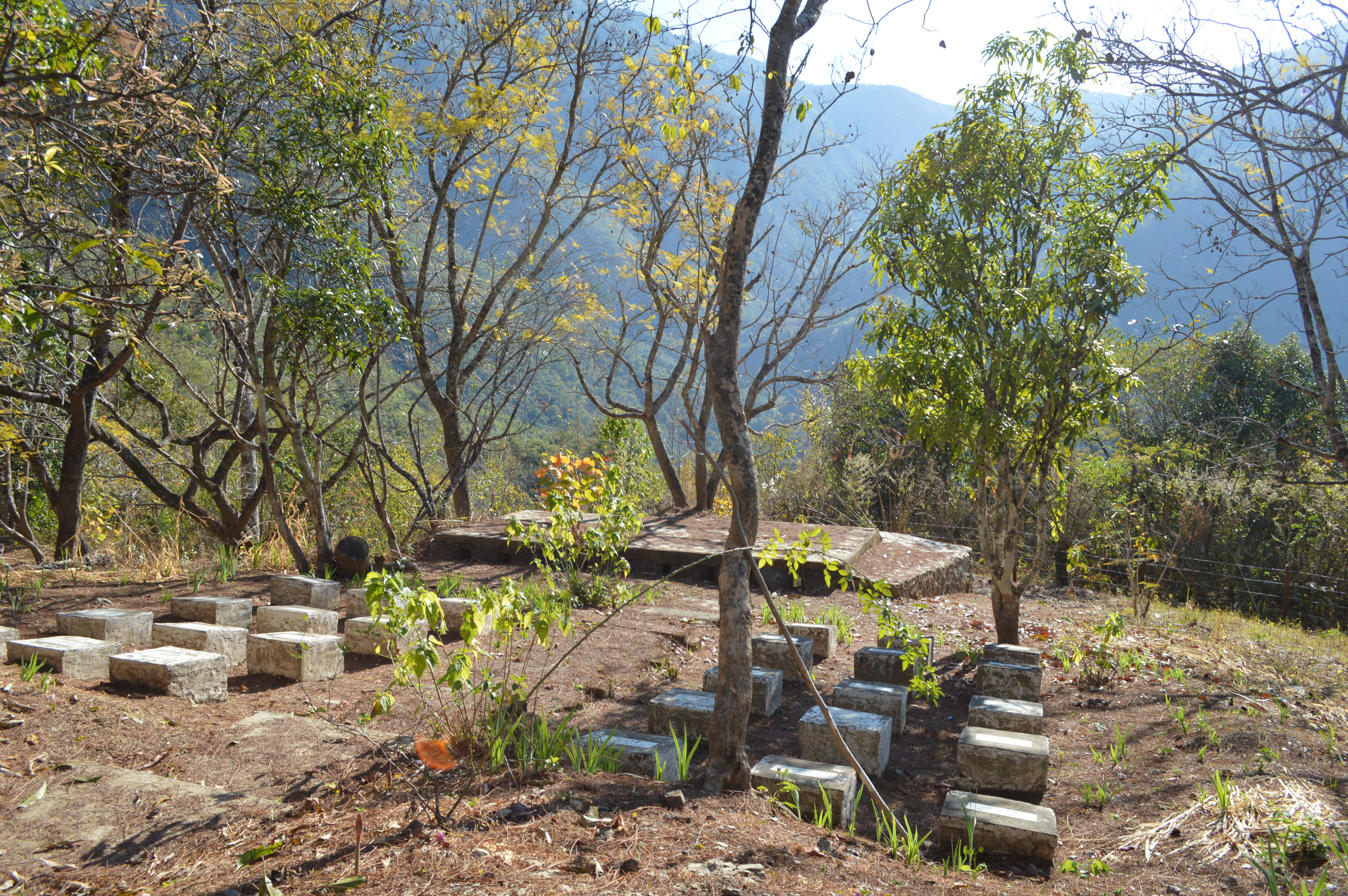
- Siallum Fort

Site information
- Type: Trenches, defensive fort.

Location
- Coordinates: 23.19472222°N 93.72861111°E

Site history
- Built: 1889
- In use: 1889
- Battles/wars: The Battle of Siallum/Chin Lushai Expedition (1889-1890)

Fort Siallum, is a defensive fort in Chin State, Myanmar, built during the British annexation of Chin Hills, Myanmar. The fort was built by the Chin (Sizang) in the year of 1889 and located near Voklak village in Tedim Township, Myanmar.

On 4 May 1889, The Chin (Sizang tribe) warriors and the British Chin Field Force fought fiercely at Siallum Fort. A medical officer, Surgeon Captain Ferdinand Le Quesne of the Chin Field Force was awarded the Victoria Cross for his gallantry displayed in the battle.

== Background ==
When the British Empire annexed Burma in 1885, Chin Hills did not fall automatically under the British colonial rule. Chin Hills at that time was independent nations and King Thibaw Min did not have the authority over Chin Hills. After the fall of Mandalay, the British then advanced to Burma's western borders and annexed Kalay valley in 1886. From 1887, the British administration in Upper Burma started communication with the Chin tribal leaders. The British political officer, Captain F.D. Raikes and the Chin tribal leaders held several meetings. The main discussion was about establishing a trade route to link British territories i.e. Myanmar and eastern India through the Chin Hills. The Tashons Chief Pu Con Bik refused to agree to establishing a trade route. Further negotiations failed and the Chin warriors made several raids to Kalay/Kabaw Valley. At the same time, the Tashons who were the most influential and powerful tribe in the northern Chin Hills at that time harbored Prince Shwegyophyu (son of Kanaung Mintha) who was wanted by the British police for killing two British officers, namely Major J.J. Kennedy (Second Infantry Regiment of the Hyderabad Contingent) and Captain H.E. Walter Belville (Assistant Commissioner of Upper Burma) during the Chinbyit Battle.

The British administration in Burma then sent an ultimatum to the Sizang chief to deliver Khai Kam together with the captives whom he carried off. An ultimatum was also sent to the Fahlam Council to deliver the Prince Shwegyophyu and his followers. When the ultimatums were ignored by the Chin, the British force then launched an expedition known as The Chin Lushai Expedition (1888-1889). The British spent the month of November in 1888 preparing for the expedition. Brigadier-General Faunce arrived in Kanpale with a 1200 strong force and Captain Raikes, and proceeded to establish defensive positions along the valley. A levy of Military Police (later 2nd Battalion of Burma Rifle) guarded the Yaw valley against the depredations of the Southern Chins. Capt. Raikes and his assistant Mr. Hall collected intelligence about the Chin, their villages and the routes into the hills. Hills coolies were collected in Assam and sent for the expeditions. The forces for expedition were gathered at Kanpale (Stockade No.1) and Gurkha 42nd Battalion was added to the expedition.

The strategy was to first march against the northern Chin Hills of Sizang (Siyin) valley. There was no road to the hills at that time, therefore, a mule track had to be constructed by the British expeditionary force. By the beginning of December 1888, the mule track was completed, and led until the foot of the hill, where there they established No.2 Stockade i.e. Zawlkin (now Khai Kam Town). The road construction continued towards the hills and reached Phatzang where a rough No.3 stockade was established.

On hearing the news of the British advance, the Sizang (Siyin) council then sent Khai Kam of Khuasak to Tedim to meet Khaw Cin (the chief of Kamhau). The next day a Chin force consisting of 1630 [1,200 (Siyin/Sizang), 400 (Kamhau) and 30 (Sukte) prepared to defend their motherland. The Tashon also gathered warriors from her powerful neighboring tribes. On 7 December 1888, the Sizang started their offensive by attacking the road constructors. On 24 December, the Sizang again attacked the road working party and killed a sepoy. On Christmas day, the combined forces of Sizang/Siyin, Kamhau an Sukte attacked the working party under command of Lt. Butcher of 42 Gurkha Bn. The Sizang/Siyin were in constant co-ordination with the Tashons. On 10 December 1888, the great force of Tashon made a simultaneous attack on the villages of Sihaung, Kyawywa and Kundu. At the same time, 80 Tashons warriors clashed head to head with 42nd Gurkha Light infantry led by Capt. Westmoreland. On the same day, the Sizang/Siyin attacked Indin and a combined force of Sukte and Kamhau attacked the military post at Kangyi (20miles north of Kalemyo). The Chins showed their planning abilities and military capabilities in this simultaneous attack to the various British positions.

The British officers were impressed by the Chin capabilities as "the Chins were in great force, and we now know that Tashons and Siyins (Sizang) were fighting side by side on this occasion. The Chins swooped down from the heights on to the party, which was working on a narrow spur, and attacked them from all four sides, fighting under cover of heavy undergrowth. The collies bolted and the troops fell back after holding their ground some little time. Whilst disputing every stage of our advance into their hills, the Chins showed considerable tactical ability by taking the offensive in the plains and attacking Shan villages and our posts in the rear of advancing column".

== Chin – Lushai Expedition (1888 - 1889) ==
Since the Chin showed their military prowess by inflicting some losses on the invading forces, the British Army took the Chin seriously. General Sir George White Commander-in-Chief of Burma, personally went to supervise the expedition. He arrived in Kanpale (near Kalaymyo) on 30 December 1888 and joined the expedition force. The Chin warriors built a stockade at Leisan Mual (Red Rocky Gate) and stood firm. On 27 January 1889, the Chin warriors attacked the road workers and the British sent their troops to engage the Chin warriors. The Chin warriors gave strong resistance but the superior British fire power forced the Chin warriors to retreat. The Chin warriors then stood firm at Leisen Mual stockade which was the last line of defence. The British couldn’t take the stockade initially, so reinforcements were ordered and the British charged the stockade again and the stockade fell. As the last line of defence was breached by the superior British force, the door to the Sizang/Siyin valley was wide open. The British forces marched to Leisang range, from where they could see the villages within Sizang valley. General Sir. George White described his experience of the battles with the Chin as "Enemy yesterday attacked our working 1 party on road above this and held our covering party, 40 British and loo Gurkhas, from 9 till 3, when I arrived and ordered their positions to be charged. We carried all, driving them entirely away, getting off ourselves wonderfully cheaply. Only one Norfolk dangerously wounded. Enemy in considerable numbers, using many rifles and plenty ammunition. They fired at least 1,000 rounds, standing resolutely until actually charged, even trying to outflank us. Their loss probably about eight or ten, but they were carried down the khuds at once. Most difficult enemy to see or hit 1 ever fought".

The battle at Leisen Mual was a serious blow to the Chin and they realized that it was impossible to save their villages. The leader Pu Khai Kam then burned his capital Khuasak before the arrival of the British, then moved to the jungle to start Guerrilla warfare. At the same time, the Chin warriors of the Sizang/Siyin, Kamhau, Sukte and Khuano were assembling at Buanman. The British saw the assembly and they fired their artillery at Buanman. The cannon balls exploded spectacularly, leading the Chin to realise that they fought a far superior force and they lost the heart to resist. By February 1889, the British captured Khuasak, Buanman and Thuklai. A military post Fort White was established in honour of General George White. The British expedition force then burned the whole of Sizang/Siyin villages as Carey & Tuck wrote in the Chin Hills: by 6 March 1889, not a single Sizang village remained in existence. The destruction of Sizang/Siyin villages was accomplished with a good deal of firing, but very little damage to life and limb.

Although the Chin people were beaten by a far superior force and driven out of their villages, they showed no sign of surrender and attacked British posts whenever they had an opportunity. They ambushed British posts, cut telegraph cables and stole cattle from the British whenever possible. The Sizang resisted the British from the forest for two years.

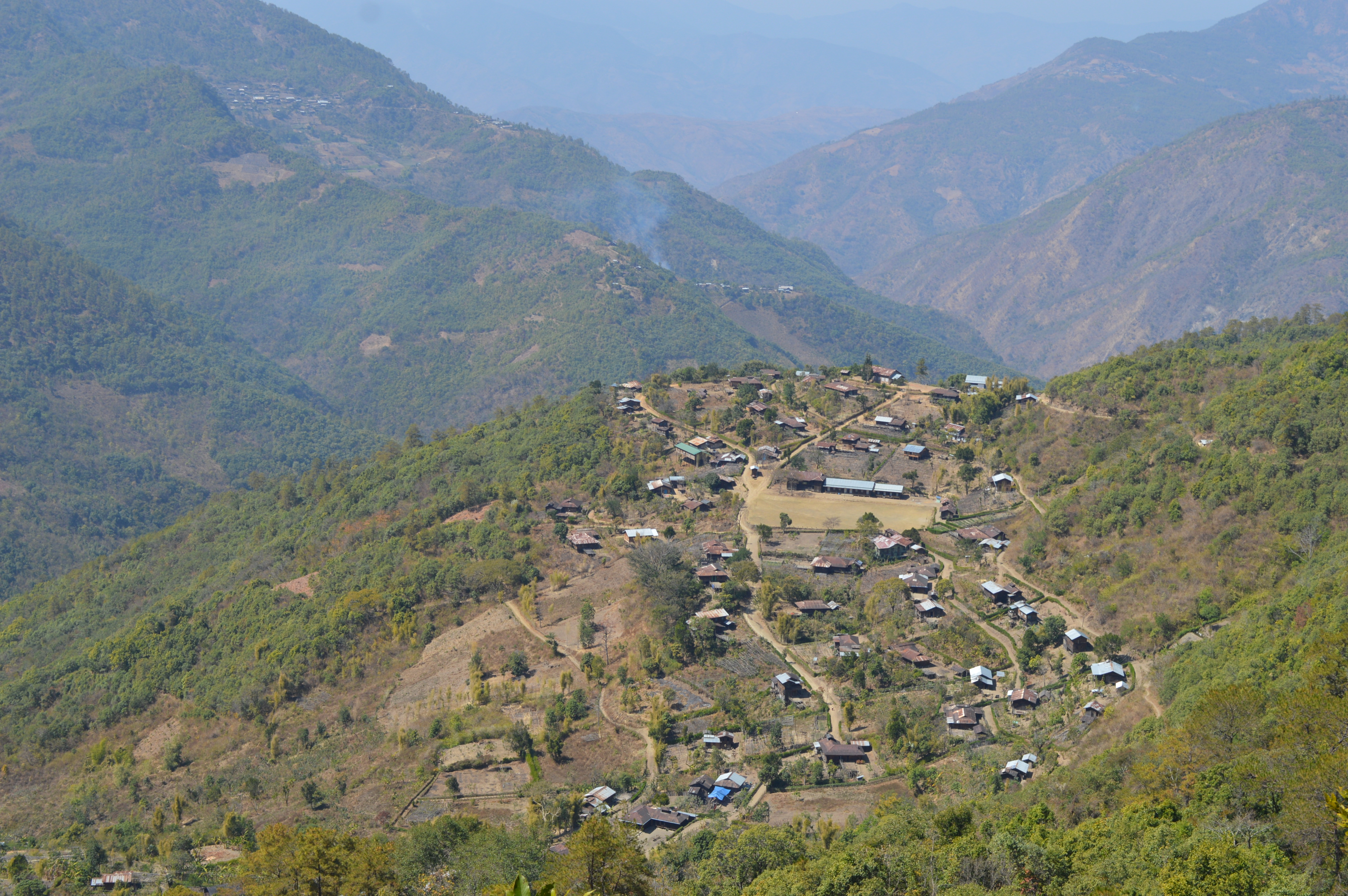
Voklak Village, Chin State, Myanmar

== The Battle of Siallum ==
The Sizang (Siyin) warriors learned that they were not able to defeat British forces when fighting in the open, or from behind stockades. As they could not withstand the charges of British and Gurkha troops the Sizang warrior tried a different tactic which involved fighting from covered-in trenches. The Sizang warriors built a fort which was basically trenches which were all covered-in by leaves and wood. This fort was built at Siallum. In 1890, Siallum was a settlement of about 30 houses in which about 100 persons of the Buanman clan lived. "Sial" means the head (the toughest part) of a mithun and "Lum" means Fort. The Siallum fort consists of "Kulhpi", "Kulh Peang" and "Nupi Kulh". "Khulhpi" is the main fort where the Sizang warriors took position and fire upon the arrive of the British’s Chin Field Force. "Kulhpeang" was built for the spirit agent (or) medium Pu En Khawm and family. "Nupi Kulh" was built for elders, children and women. At the time of the fighting, about 80 women and children were hiding in this Nupi Kulh. The Sizang also built a watch tower known as "Ngalvildum" at a place called Nalum Mual.

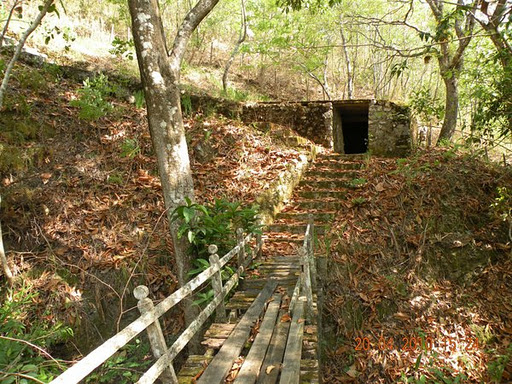
Siallum Fort - Nupi Kulh Fort where women, children and elders hide during the Battle of Siallum

The British forces stationed at Fort White started noticing some new huts at the site of Taitan. The British called it Taitan village but it was known by the Sizang/Siyin as Siallum. To destroy this, Brigadier General Faunce assembled a column consisting of 65 rifles of the 2nd Battalion Norfolk Regiment and 60 rifles of the 42nd Gurkha Light Infantry. This column is also known as the Chin Field Force and was led by Captain C. H. Westmoreland of the 42nd Gurkha Light Infantry. The column marched from Fort White – Buanman – Mualsan – Ngumpi – Nalum - Taikhe then began the approach to Siallum (Taitan) village. The approach of the column was first noticed by the Sizang/Siyin dogs (fox-terrier). Pu Zong On who was on duty at the watch tower at Nalum Mual also spotted the British column. He then ran to the village and informed the villagers. The whole village was then evacuated to the fort. The non-combatant families, women, children and elders were then to hide in the fort. The Sizang warriors also took up positions and were readied for the battle. When the British column arrived at Siallum (Taitan) village, the village was empty and quiet. The following is an account of the battle given by Captain Westmoreland of the 42nd Gurkha Light Infantry Battalion:

"The column, consisting of 65 rifles of the 2nd Battalion Norfolk Regiment and 60 rifles of the 42nd Gurkha Light Infantry, occupied the heights above New Tartan [Siallum] without opposition. The main body advanced with the intention of rushing the village, but encountered determined resistance from the Chins, who were strongly posted in two stockades. The upper stockade consisted of a log-hut, the sides and roof of which were bullet-proof. It was connected with a ravine to the east by a trench about 3 feet wide, 5 feet deep, and 20 yards long. The trench was covered with logs and planks flush with the ground. The hut itself was surrounded at a distance of 5 or 6 yards with rows of sharp-pointed stakes about 3 feet high. The second stockade was in the bed of the ravine. It consisted of a hole about 6 or 9 feet square, from which a trench ran down the ravine. Both trench and hole were covered with logs and planks and were bullet-proof. In both stockades there were a few spaces between the logs through which the Chins fired, and the only way in which they could be carried was by pulling away some of the timber. At the lower stockade, early in the action, Second-Lieutenant Michel fell mortally wounded. The troops at first endeavored to turn out the defenders of the upper stockade by firing through the openings between the logs. Before long the covered trench was noticed and pulled open and the Chins in it were shot. After accomplishing this under fire from the Chins in the lower stockade and in the neighbouring jungle, the column retired, burning the village as it went. The Chins, who had suffered heavily, did not follow, being deterred by the loss which they had sustained and kept in check by a small covering party on the heights. In this action our loss was one officer killed and two (Captain Mayne and Surgeon Ferdinand Le Quesne) severely wounded and three men killed and eight wounded. Ferdinand Le Quesne received the Victoria Cross for conspicuous coolness and gallantry displayed whilst dressing Lieutenant Michel‘s wound".

Captain Westmoreland also reported the details of the battle to Gen. Faunce who in turn reported to the Chief Secretary to the Chief Commissioner of Burma. Gen. Faunce's telegram reads as follows: Begins: 323 C.F., Fort White, May 5th 1889. A new Siyin village near site of Tartan [Siallum], south-east of this, having been seen from Sagyilain by party referred to in my 320C.F., I sent 65 Rifles, Norfolk, 60 Rifles, 42nd, under Major Shepherd, Norfolk, yesterday to destroy new Tartan [Siallum] which consisted of 15 houses. No opposition till after troops entered village, at bottom of which two very strong stockades, flanking each other and connected by covered way with plank-roof. Siyin Chins held their fire till troops were within 50 yards. They stood their ground and fought with great pluck, eight being killed with the bayonet. In the first stockade their loss was 30 killed and many wounded. I regret our loss was heavy

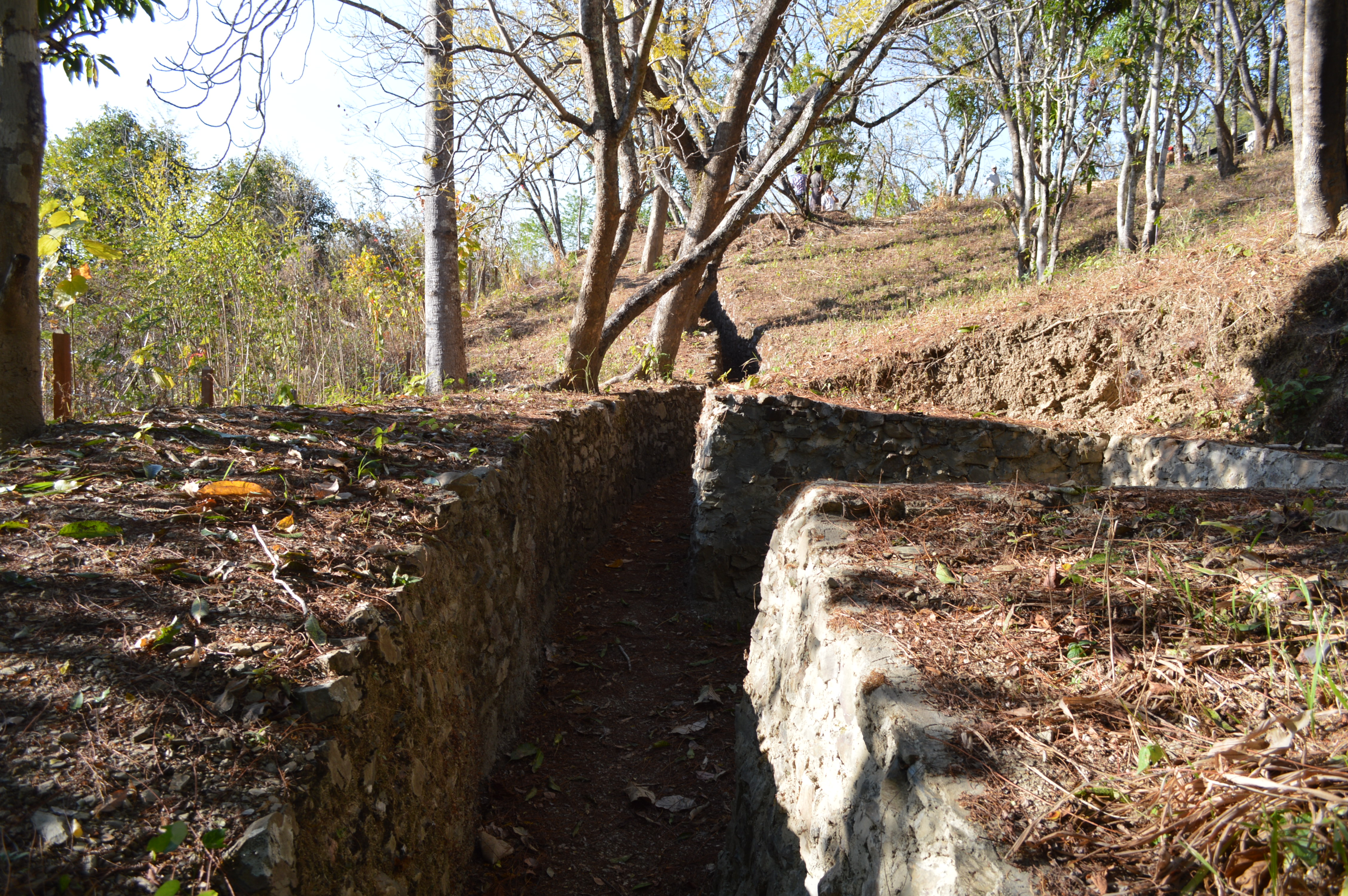
Siallum Fort, the trenches and the fort known as Kulhpeang

The secretary of the Chief Commissioner then replied "YOUR No. 1283. Chief Commissioner (Sir Charles Crosthwaite, K.C.S.I.) will be glad to know whether it is to be understood that the attack was successful and that both stockades were taken and the village destroyed".

Political officer Major F.D. Raikes then replied to the Chief Secretary to the Chief Commissioner, Burma on 15 May 1889 "New village of Taitan [Siallum] was destroyed, but one stockade was not taken as Officer Commanding Force considered if there were further casualty’s column could not return to Fort White that night and no arrangements made for camping out".

The Chin Field Force did not destroy the fort nor defeat the Chin warriors. The Chin warriors did not give up fighting, despite the heavy losses. As the British column had also sustained casualties, Capt. Westmoreland decided to retreat back to Fort White. The Chin warriors did not chase them down as they had also suffered heavy casualties. At the time of the British retreat, at least 40 Chin warriors were still shooting at the retreating column. Capt. Westmoreland then razed the newly built village, Siallum, to ashes on his way back to Fort White. Immediately after the battle of Siallum, Brigadier General Faunce was replaced by General Symons on 9 May 1889.

After the battle on 4 May, the Chin warriors repaired Siallum fort and made ready for another round of assault. Gen. Symons then led a column to the fort on 10 May 1889 and defeated the Chin. The Siallum fort was completely destroyed and burnt. The details of Gen. Symons operation was reported as follows: "Following from General Officer Commanding Chin Field Force. Begins: May 10th. Party 150 Rifles, Norfolk, and 42nd Gurkhas, under Brigadier-General Symons visited TAITAN, scene of fight on 4th May, yesterday. Were unopposed though signal shots were fired. Found many graves and several bodies were buried in enemy‘s trenches. Siyin Chins repaired stockade which was all completely destroyed and burnt".

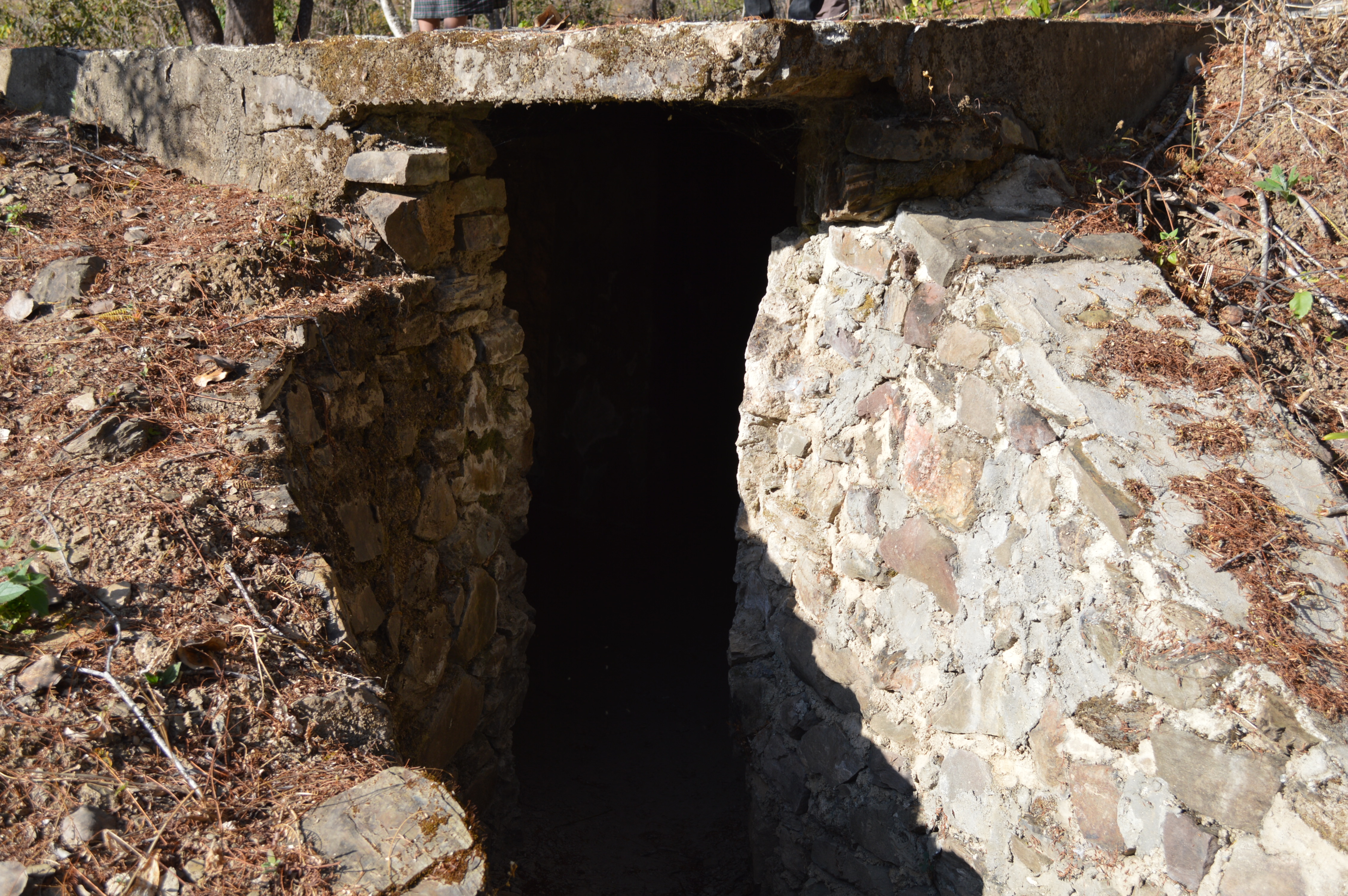
The main fort known as Kulhpi

== Casualties ==
Casualties for the British force were four killed (one officer and three enlisted men) and ten wounded (two officers and eight enlisted men). The casualties for the Chin were 28 killed. Buanman Chief Pu Lian Kam was also killed in this battle. The casualties are as follows:

1. Pu Lian Kam (Buanman Chief) 2. Pu Vum Mang 3. Pu Tuang Vungh 4. Pu Pau Suang 5. Pu Zong On 6. Pu Siam Pau 7. Pu Khup Vum 8. Pu Khai Suak 9. Pu Lam Khup 10. Pu Zong Thuam 11. Pu Za Vum 12. Pu Thang Hau 13. Pu Lu Kam 14. Pu Son Suang 15. Pu En Kham 16. Pu Pau Lam 17. Hang Sing 18. Pu Tuang Mang 19. Pi Lian Vung 20. Pi Kuai Hung 21. Pi Vung Neam 22. Pi Uap Huai 23. Pi Huai Nuam 24. Pi Lam Ciang 25. Pi Uap Niang 26. Pi Niang Ciang 27. Pi Dim Ngiak 28. Pi Hoi Nuam

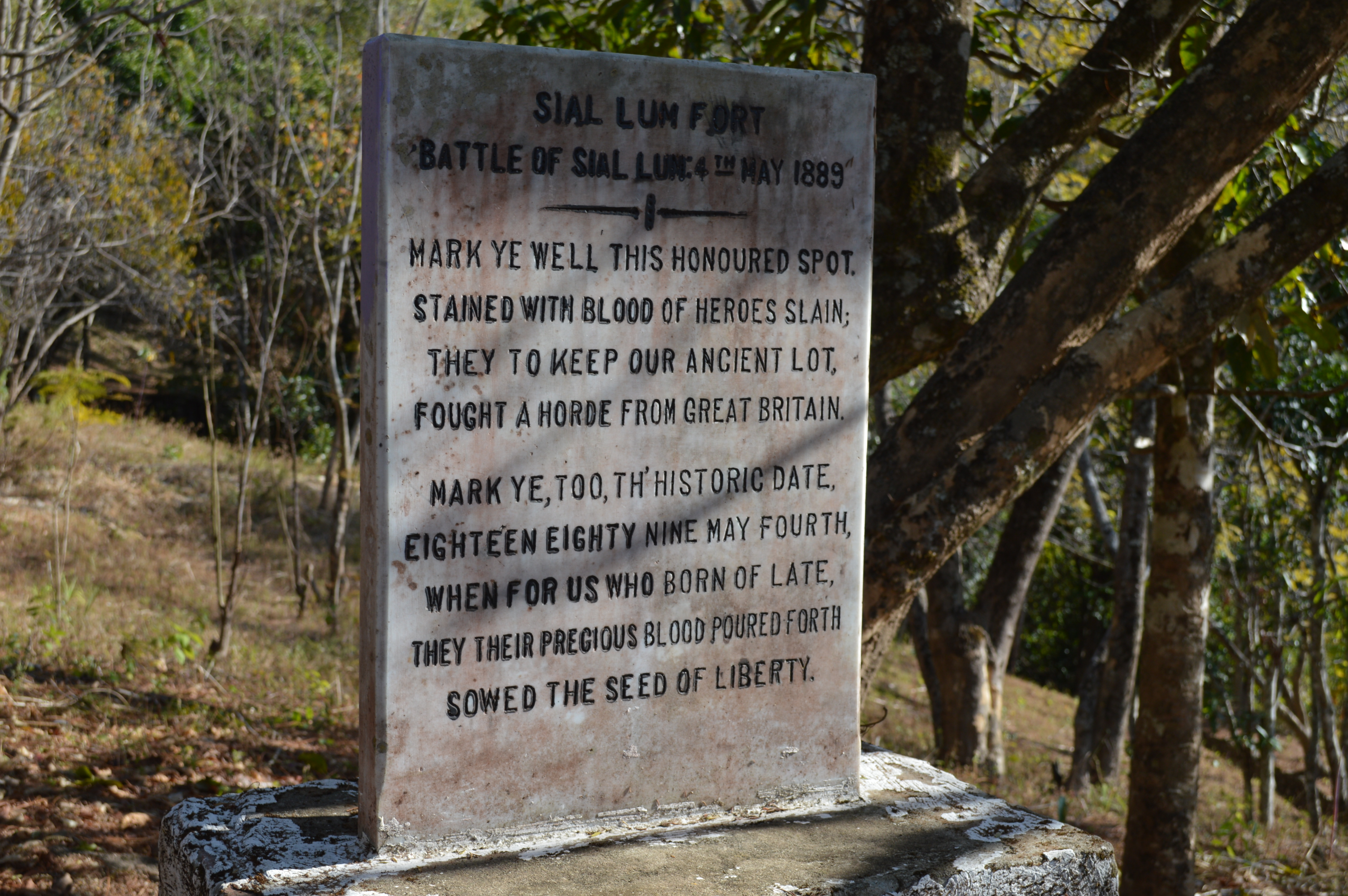
A poem dedicated for the Battle of Siallum composed by Rev. S.T. Haugo

== Honour ==
Pu Pau Thual who was at the battle defending Siallum fort composed the following poem:

Bodies of relatives and enemy
Were heaped like logs on one another
Bodies of relatives served as my fort
And called the heroic names of my clansmen as I killed the enemy

The following poem was composed by the late Rev. T. Hau Go Sukte in honour of the heroines and heroes of the Battle of Siallum. This poem is still in displayed at the site of the fort.

SIALLUM FORTRESS

Mark ye well this honoured spot,
Stained with blood of heroes slain;
They to keep our ancient lot,
Fought a horde from Great Britain.
Mark ye, too th’historic date,
Eighteen eighty nine May fourth;
They their precious blood poured forth;
When for us who born of late,
They their precious blood poured forth;
Sowed the seed of liberty.
