= Sizang =

Sizang or Sizang Chin may be,

- Sizang people
- Sizang language
