= Khup Lian inscription =

Burmese stone inscription

The Khup Lian Inscription in the Lophei, Chin State, Myanmar

The Khup Lian Inscription is a bilingual inscription located at the top of Lophei village in Chin State, Myanmar. It is located 5 miles from Fort White which in turn is located halfway between the 48-mile Tedim-Kalaymyo motor car road. The inscription is a brief autobiography of him, including his genealogy, the capture of a semi-automatic rifle in hand-to-hand combat with a British soldier during the first British invasion of Chin Hills in 1888–1889, his involvement in the Sizang-Gungal rebellion of 1892-94 and also about his hunting trophies.

It is written in both Burmese and English.

== History of Lophei ==
The village of Lophei was founded by Khup Lian's great, great, grandfather Chief Kim Lei, eleven generations before him. This village, of around 100 households, was completely destroyed by the Tashons during the 1800s. When the British invaded the Chin Hills in 1888–1889, Chief Khup Lian, alongside other fellow Sizang Chiefs, led battles against British troops who were under the command of Major-General (later Field Marshal) George White. Khup Lian personally captured a semi-automatic rifle in hand-to-hand combat, making him the first Chin person to obtain a semi-automatic gun.

Khup Lian then fought once again, together with Chief Khup Pau of Khuasak town and his sons Khai Kam and Mang Pum, in the Sizang-Gungal Rebellion of 1892–1893. After rebellion failed, Kim Lel's descendants and the Lopheis were split into two independent villages, Khuasak and Lophei, in order to weaken the power of the Thuan Tek. Khup Lian's hereditary chieftainship was restored, and his people were allowed to return to Lophei in 1894.

Chief Khup Lian (right) with Rev. Za Khup (Photo taken on July 14, 1960). Khup Lian was about 90 years old when this photo was taken

== Full inscription ==
I am the 15th generation down from the house of Thuan Tak who is the original progenitor of the Sizang tribe. Being an orphan from childhood I exerted myself all alone in many enterprises by which I became a self-made man with many and various achievements. When the British invasion of 1888 undertook their first expedition against us (the Chins) I attained the age of 20 years and I played an active part in the defence against them. When the British troops marched up the Signalling at No. 5 Stockade the united forces of the Sizang, Sukte and Kamhau made a good resistance to the British attack which was easily repulsed. On this occasion I personally captured one rifle. When the second expedition took place in 1889 the British, too well armed to be resisted against, carried the day: hence the annexation of Chin Hills. I then rebuilt and settled in Lophei Village which was founded by Kim Lel and was destroyed by the Tashons in my grandfather, Lua Thuam's time. Henceforth my hereditary chieftainship of the Lophei clan was restored to me. Moreover, I founded the three villages-Tuisau, Tuival, and Suangdaw all of which have ever since been in my jurisdiction. As I was advanced in age after my service of 40 years as Chief, my eldest son succeeded me to the chieftainship. Being highly pleased with my meritorious and loyal services, His Honour., the Lieutant-Governor of Burma in 1922 presented me a D.B.B.L [a double barrel hunting] gun as a reward and a good service certificate. And to mention more I was given many good certificates, by the various Administrative Officers of Chin Hills.

The Burmese text on the inscription may be translated as follows:

The Sizang people who dwell in the villages of Lophei, Khuasak, Buanman, Thuklai, and Lamkhai are the descendants of Suantak/ Thuantak. I belong to the fifteenth generation. The history of my lifetime has been recorded in Chin/Zo and English. The animals drawn on the memorial stone indicate Khup Lian's hunting trophies: a tiger, three bison, two leopards, three wild boars, four deer and several barking deer. (The number of pictures on the memorial stone are only symbolic and they do not say the number of the animals that had been killed by him. These statistics are from his sons' records.)
