= Ferdinand Le Quesne =

British Army surgeon awarded for gallantry (1863–1950)

Ferdinand Simeon Le Quesne
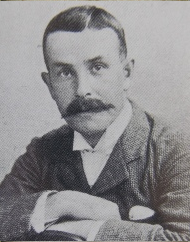
- Born: 25 December 1863; St Helier, Jersey
- Died: 14 April 1950 (aged 86); Bristol, County of Bristol
- Burial place: Canford Cemetery, Bristol
- Military career
- Allegiance: United Kingdom
- Branch: British Army
- Rank: Lieutenant-Colonel
- Units: Royal Army Medical Corps
- Conflicts: Second Boer War; World War I
- Awards: Victoria Cross

Lieutenant-Colonel Ferdinand Simeon Le Quesne, VC (25 December 1863 – 14 April 1950) was a British Army surgeon and recipient of the Victoria Cross, the highest and most prestigious award for gallantry in the face of the enemy that can be awarded to British and Commonwealth forces.

== Details ==
Le Quesne was educated at King's College London before he joined the British Army as surgeon captain on 28 July 1886. After the Third Anglo-Burmese War, local leaders started a guerilla war against the British forces who now occupied the country. Le Quesne's action was during this period. He was 25 years old, and a surgeon in the Army Medical Service (later the Royal Army Medical Corps) serving with the Chin Field Force in Burma when the following deed took place for which he was awarded the VC.

On 4 May 1889 during the attack on the village of Tartan (now Siallum near Voklaak Village), Burma (now Myanmar) by a column of the Chin Field Force, Surgeon Le Quesne remained for the space of about ten minutes within five yards of the loopholed stockade, from which the enemy was firing, dressing with perfect coolness and self-possession, the wounds of an officer who shortly afterwards died. Surgeon Le Quesne was himself severely wounded later while attending to the wounds of another officer.

== Further information ==
Le Quesne served with the Chin-Lushai expeditionary force in 1890, and with the Wuntho Field Force in 1891, and was promoted to surgeon major on 28 July 1898. He served in the Second Boer War in South Africa, from which he returned in August 1902. He later served in World War I, and retired in 1918 with the rank of lieutenant colonel.

== The medal ==
His VC is held at the Jersey Museum in St Helier.
