= Sizang people =

Sizang
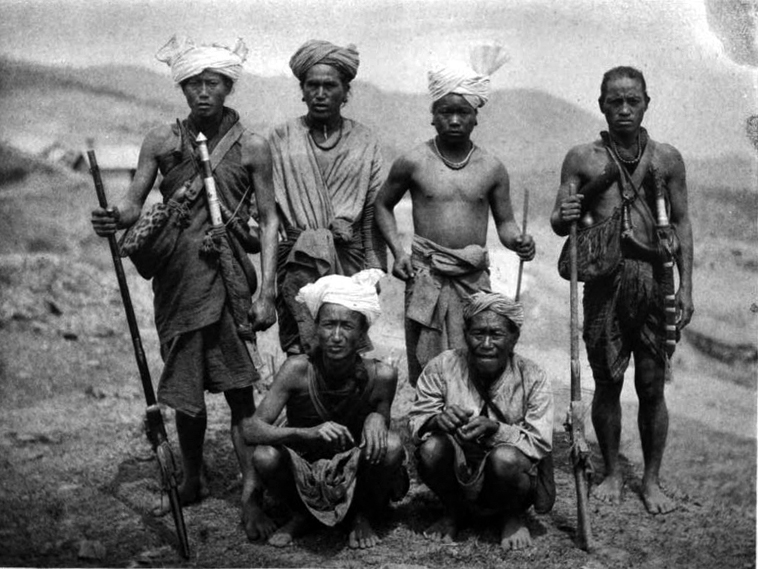
- Sizang chiefs in British Burma, 1900

Total population
- 11,000 (2025)

Regions with significant populations
- Chin State; Khaikam, Tedim District

Languages
- Sizang language

Religion
- Christianity; animism

Related ethnic groups
- Tedim, Zo, Chin

The Sizang people (also known as Siyin or Taute) are primarily the descendants of Pu Thuantak, also known as Suantak in the Tedim language and by related clans. The Siyin Valley is in present-day Chin State, Myanmar, and was settled by descendants of the Pu Thuantak who moved from their original home of Chindwin with other Zo people.

In 2025, the Sizang population in Myanmar was around 11,000. They speak the Sizang language, which is mutually intelligible with Vaiphei, Paite, and Tedim.

== Etymology ==
Si means "salt water", and zang is a northern side or plain; the Sizang originated north of a brine spring. Taute, as they are known in Manipur records, means "fat people".

== History ==
During the late 19th century, when the British Imperial Army tried to colonise the Chin Hills, the Sizang resisted.

== Culture ==
The Sizang had a warrior tradition similar to that of the Naga people. Headhunting was widely practiced. Sizang society was patriarchal, with inheritances going to sons.

The marriage of a man and woman from the same village, known as phungkhawm, was forbidden. The eldest man in the groom's tribe would go to the bride's tribe to propose marriage, bringing a gift of modokzu (transl. a pot of liquor) for the bride's family. If the proposal was declined, he returned with the modokzu.

Male babies are named five days after birth, and female babies after three days. They are given a temporary surname to protect them from spirits. Parents choose the name; the first son is named after his paternal grandfather and the first daughter is named after her paternal grandmother.

== Religion ==
Before their conversion to Christianity, the Sizang were animists; they worshiped nature, doai (the devil), and Pathian (God). They also worshiped unknown spirits to avoid harm. Illnesses were believed to be caused by evil spirits that lived within nature. The Sizang believed that their ancestors emerged from a gourd in the village of Chin-Nwe. The bible was translated into the Sizang language in 2004.

== Economy ==
The main occupation is slash-and-burn agriculture. Livestock such as cattle, gayals, goats, chickens and pigs are also raised. Ever since Christianity first arrived in the Siyin Valley, many have been ordained pastors. Other Sizang work in the public sector as civil servants, and many have also served as soldiers during World War 2, and also in the Burmese military.

== Language ==
The Sizang language is mutually intelligible with the Tedim language and India's Vaiphei and Thadou languages. Sizang, which did not have a written script until British colonisation, is written in Latin script.

Comparisons of the Sizang and Tedim languages
English	Sizang	Tedim
How are you?	Na dam le? / Dam maw? / Dam ni?	Nang dam maw?
Where are you going?	Ko'ng (koi-sung) pai tu ni?	Ko'h (koi-ah) pai ding na?
What are you doing?	Bang vawt ni?	Bang hih na?
Have you eaten?	An ne zo ni?	An ne khin maw? / An ne zo maw?

== See also ==
- Siyin, Myanmar
- Tedim Township
- Siallum Fort
- Khai Kam
- Khup Lian Inscription

== Sources ==
- Grierson, George A. (1904). "Siyin". Specimens of the Kuki-Chin and Burma Groups. Calcutta, India: Superintendent of Government Printing.
- Hau, Vum Ko (1963). Profile of A Burma Frontier Man. Kilatmadju Press.
- Poudel, Kamal; Lohani, Ram Raj; Poudel, Tikaram (2019). "Cultural and Linguistic Affinities Amongst Meitei-Sizang-Thadou" (PDF). Nepalese Linguistics. 34: 58–67. ISSN 0259-1006. Archived from the original (PDF) on 13 December 2024.
