= Charles Ogston =

British Army general (1877–1944)

Brigadier-General Charles Ogston CB CMG DSO

Deputy Director of Recruiting and Organisation, War Office
- In office 1924 – April 1925

Personal details
- Born: 14 September 1877
- Died: 10 November 1944 (aged 67)

Brigadier-General Charles Ogston CB CMG DSO (14 September 1877 – 10 November 1944) was a British Army staff officer.

Ogston was the son of Alexander Milne Ogston of Ardoe, Kincardineshire. He was educated at the Royal Military College, Sandhurst and commissioned a second lieutenant in the Gordon Highlanders in November 1897. He served on the North-West Frontier of India from 1897 to 1898 and took part in the Tirah Campaign under Sir William Lockhart. Promoted to lieutenant on 21 July 1899, he was later the same year sent to South Africa to serve as an intelligence officer in the Second Boer War. He took part in the Relief of Kimberley (February 1900), including the Battle of Magersfontein (11 December 1899), followed by fighting in the Orange Free State from February to May 1900, including the Battle of Paardeberg (18–27 February 1900). After a brief hospital-stay, he was in May 1900 posted to the Transvaal Republic, where he took part in the occupation of Johannesburg and Pretoria, the capital of the republic, followed by service around the occupied areas, including the Battle of Bergendal (August 1900) and fighting near Lydenburg. He was promoted to captain on 22 January 1902, and following the end of hostilities in early June 1902 left Cape Town on board the SS Orotava, arriving at Southampton the next month.

He served as adjutant from January 1906 to January 1909, and attended the Staff College from January 1910.

He then served in a series of staff appointments, as a deputy assistant adjutant and quartermaster-general from August 1912, assistant quartermaster-general (as a temporary lieutenant-colonel) from January 1916, and deputy adjutant and quartermaster-general (as a temporary brigadier-general) from October 1918. He was promoted temporary major in August 1914 and substantive major in 1915. During his active service in the First World War he was mentioned in despatches, and he was awarded the Distinguished Service Order (DSO) in June 1915, promoted brevet lieutenant-colonel in January 1917, and appointed Companion of the Order of St Michael and St George (CMG) in 1918. He was also appointed Commander of the Italian Order of Saints Maurice and Lazarus, and awarded the French Croix de Guerre and the Italian Croce di Guerra.

He served in South Russia during the Russian Civil War in 1919, for which he was appointed Companion of the Order of the Bath (CB) in November 1919.

He was promoted substantive lieutenant-colonel in December 1920 and colonel in April 1923. He served as assistant adjutant-general from April 1923 and deputy director of recruiting and organisation at the War Office (with the temporary rank of colonel on the staff) from 1924 to April 1925, when he retired with the honorary rank of brigadier-general.

His home was at Kildrummy Castle in Aberdeenshire.
