= Lockhart Mission =

The Lockhart Mission was an exploratory mission sanctioned in 1885 by the Secretary of State for India and headed by Sir William Alexander Lockhart to survey the Hindu Kush ranges and endeavor to cultivate friendly relations between the Mehtar of Chitral and the Government of India. The mission (1885–1886) yielded much success and set the course for the region for many decades to come.

== Background ==
The 1880s had seen a remarkable increase in Russian activity in Central Asia; this fact, coupled with the unsettled state of Anglo-Russian relations, necessitated assessment of the geography of the Hindu Kush region. The Gilgit Agency had been withdrawn by the liberal Lord Lytton in 1881, but with the coming to office of Lord Dufferin and the changing political atmosphere, interest in its revival surged. In 1885, Lord Dufferin, with the sanction of the Secretary of State for India, assembled a team under Sir William Lockhart (then a Colonel) for exploration and strategic assessment of the Hindu Kush region. One of the principal tasks of the mission was to enter into more definite and complete relations with Mehtar Aman ul-Mulk of Chitral and to report on the defences of the state.

== The Mission ==
Though Sir William Lockhart had no experience of hill tribes he was chosen to lead the mission, consisting of an Army Intelligence Officer, 2 competent officers from the Survey Department, 300 men and over 300 animals carrying goods and items of all kind including a load of 200 Snider–Enfield Rifles along with ammunition as present for the Mehtar of Chitral. On the 25 June 1885 the mission started from Kashmir, and on 13 June 1885 it crossed the Kamri Pass. For many miles the road ran through snow. On 29 July 1885 the mission reached Gilgit. Here it was deemed expedient to halt for some time, in order that the streams on the Chitral route, swollen by the melting snow, might subside. During the missions stay at Gilgit the officers acquired a good deal of useful knowledge regarding the area and the surrounding country.
