= Fort White, Myanmar =

Military station built by the British Army

Coordinates: 23°14′00″N 93°47′00″E

Fort White (Kuki-Chin: Thangmual) was a small military station in Chin State, Myanmar. It was built by the British Army under Field Marshal Sir George Stuart White and was the site of many local battles. It is located in Tedim Township. Remains of the fort can still be found at the site.

== History ==
While originally the base of Siyin chief Thuk Kham, George White and his troops established Fort White during British expedition of the Chin Hills on 9 April 1889. It was named after Field Marshal Sir George White, the first invading British Army officer.

It was garrisoned and a post and telegraph office established there on 13 January 1889 to be linked with their rearward Kalemyo of Sagaing Division, and other parts of the country, such as Yangon.

On 9 October 1892, Siyins rebelled against British authority and started at the site of Fort White.

A heliograph station was constructed on the Letha range west of the stockade at a distance of about four furlongs. It belonged to the Chin Hills Bn (BFF) of Falam and communicated with other outstation such as, Kalemyo, No. 3 Stockade (Natang), Dimlo-Tiddim, Lungpi-Falam and Haka.

British soldiers killed in action against the Chin forces were buried at a nearby cemetery locals dub "the white cemetery".

In 1944, during World War II, the fort was almost entirely destroyed. The remains of the fort and the nearby cemetery still mark the locality.

== Rendering ==
This fort is an important historic spot in the Chin Hills. It was painted by artist Daniel Son za Howe from his memory as he remembered seeing it in his boyhood when he frequented there for sightseeing.
