= Burmese resistance movement 1885–1895 =

Earliest resistance movements against British colonialism in Myanmar

Burmese resistance movement (1885–1895)
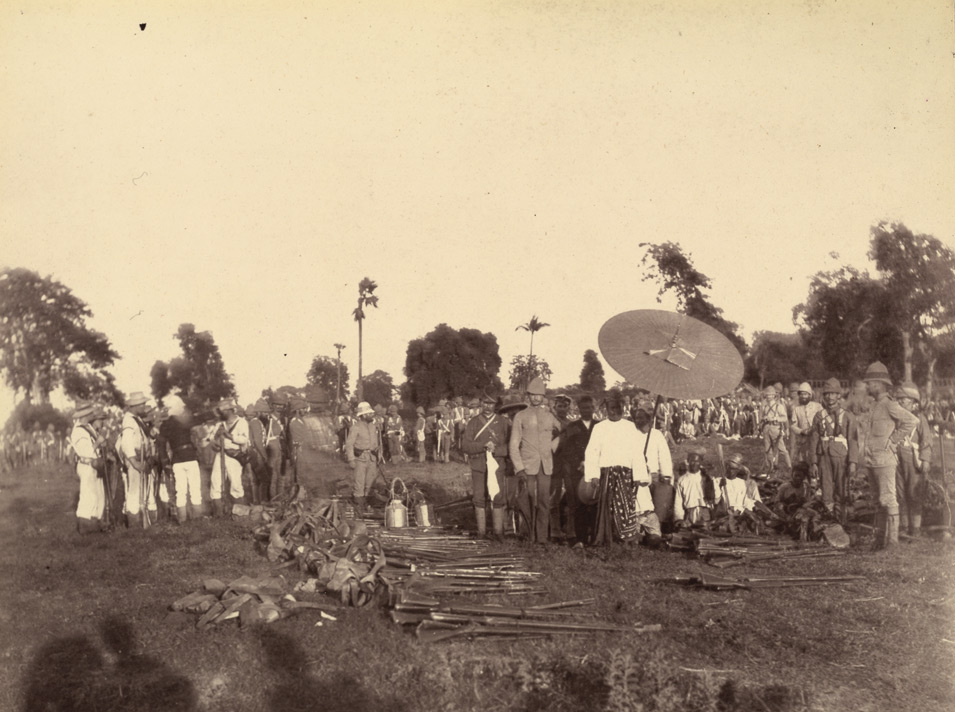
Date	1885–1895
Location	Upper Burma, Lower Burma, Shan Hills, Kachin Hills and Chin Hills
Result	British victory: Pacification of British Burma

Belligerents
Burmese rebels	(United Kingdom) British Empire: Pro-British Burmese

Commanders and leaders
Myinzaing Prince; Chaunggwa Prince †; Kanaung Prince; Shwegyobyu Prince; Bayingan Prince †; Kyimyindaing Prince †; Setkya Prince; Bo Swe †; Bo Ya Nyun; U Ottama; Mayanchaung Pongyi; Limbin Prince; U Po Saw; U Shwe Tha; U Aung Myat; Cawn Bik	Lieutenant-General Forbes; Lieutenant-General Phayre; Major Kennedy; Captain Beville; Lieutenant Eckersley; Captain Rolland; Major Gordan; Captain Dunsford; Major Robinson; Captain O’Donnell; Colonel Skene; Brigadier-General Symons; Kinwun Mingyi

Casualties and losses
Unknown but in the Hundreds Upper Burma: 312 dead (British Army Report)	Upper Burma Military Police: 46 dead, 76 wounded Army: 1,532 dead, 195 wounded

The Burmese Resistance Movement of 1885–1895 occurred almost immediately after the fall of Mandalay. Due to the rapidity of British advancement up the Irrawaddy River, the bulk of the Burmese army suffered few casualties. Many had not experienced actual fighting. Nevertheless, the issue of the Hluttaw’s order to surrender on 27 November 1885 meant that Burmese garrisons south of Mandalay had to disarm without putting up a fight. Soon widespread resistance started to break out in Upper Burma, Lower Burma, the Shan Hills, Kachin Hills and Chin Hills which did not die out until 1896.

== Resistance in Upper Burma ==
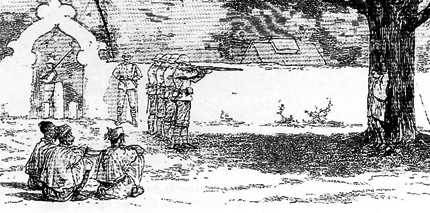
A Burmese rebel being executed at Shwebo, Upper Burma, by Royal Welch Fusiliers.

=== Myinzaing Prince ===
Fighting first broke out in Upper Burma when between 18 and 25 December 1885, 200 Shans under the leadership of the Myinzaing Prince's lieutenants Bo Manga, Myedu Myosa and Mg Lat positioned themselves along the course of the Myitnge River between Shwesayan and Maungtaw villages. On the night of 31 December 1885, the men attacked Mandalay. Myinzaing and his followers then attacked a group of British at Paleit and Htonbo in early January 1886. Following British suppression in 1886, Myinzaing was forced to move southwards, reestablishing himself at Yakhainggyi, 23 miles southeast of Kyaukse. He continued to harass the British around Kyaukse and Mandalay. The police station southeast of Mandalay was attacked on 18 April and on 30 April a great fire was started in Mandalay which killed Lt. Forbes and injured seven sepoys. Yakhainggyi continued to be the main base of operations for Myinzaing until May 1886, while the rest of his army remained at Kywetnapha and Hngetkyithaik.

Myinzaing hatched a plan to capture Mandalay by launching a full-scale attack on the city in May 1886. 300 swordsmen and 100 musketeers would attack the police station and destroy the telegraph wires. Anaukwindawhmu U Paung would lead 200 swordsmen and 1500 Shan and Burmese musketeers to attack the city directly and slaughter Burmese ministers and officials who had capitulated under the British. Maung Gyi, Myinzaing's maternal uncle, will take on Mandalay Hill and the northern suburbs with 100 swordsmen and 700 Shan and Burmese musketeers. Mongnai Sawbwa would invade the eastern suburbs and capture Yankin Hill with 300 swordsmen and 1000 Shan and Burmese musketeers. Lawksawk Sawbwa would invade Amarapura with 250 swordsmen and 700 Shan and Burmese musketeers. Myaukdawebo Maung Gale would then administer the oath of allegiance to all Sawbwas and Myosas. Nevertheless, Myinzaing's plan could not be carried out as the British were able to uncover the activities of Myinzaing's lieutenants, putting a stop to the plan. Four other monks namely U Dipa, U Ottama, U Nandiya and U Rewata were also arrested and detained at Akyab and Rangoon. In the end, Myinzaing was forced to retreat into the Myelat State of Ywangan. He contracted fever there in August 1886 and died soon after.

=== Chaunggwa Prince ===
Meanwhile, as troops of the Myinzaing Prince wreaked havoc in Mandalay, the Chaunggwa Princes along with the support of a local leader, Bo Shwe Yan, stationed themselves in Kabo with 300 to 500 men recruited from the villages of Chaunggwa, Kabo, Thetpan, Ngazinyaing, Lawagai, Oktwingan, Gyogya-U, Ingan, Zigyaung and Kokkogan. Earlier in April, Bo Shwe Yan attacked Shwedaung along with Bo Muang Gale and Bo Nga Nyein. In May, there was an attempt by the Chaunggwa Princes to combine forces with Myinzaing Prince. Their forces arrived at Gye village, 12 miles southwest of Kyaukse with 600 men to meet with Myinzaing's army at Natteik pass. This united front however did not materialize because of British retaliation. Bo Shwe Yan finally escaped into the jungles near Panlaung while the princes retreated back into Mandalay by 1887.

A plot was hatched in 1887 in Mandalay to put Saw Yan Naing on the throne. Nevertheless, the plan was foiled once again by the British, who arrested the ringleaders while Saw Yan Naing was dispatched to Rangoon. He then tried to move to Hsenwi in the northern Shan States and then to the border region between Tawngpeng and Mongmit to establish a new base for further resistance. He was killed during fighting with the British forces along the route.

=== Kanaung Prince ===
Also, during the same period in December 1885 two brother princes Hteiktin Hmat and Hteiktin Thein, sons of Mindon’s brother the Kanaung Prince, attacked and captured Shwebo from Shwebo Myowun. On 23 December, after skirmishes with two companies of the Royal Welsh Fusiliers, they gave up Shwebo but continue to harass the British forces. After a major battle at Kadu Kunitywa, the princes were defeated. Hteiktin Thein died later in January 1886 but his brother Hteiktin continued the resistance. He then established alliances with local resistance leaders Bo Hla U and Singu Myowun Bo Pyan Gyi. After continual harass and strong British retaliation, Hteiktin Hmat retreated to the north. He attacked and captured Taze with 3500 men recruited from Myedu, Wuntho and Indauktha. However, the tough jungle life was unbearable to him and like Myinzaing Prince, he died of fever in August 1887.

=== Shwegyobyu Prince ===
The Shwegyobyu Prince, whose claim to royalty was probably questionable, rose up and mobilized his forces of resistance at Kanle in the southern part of the Chindwin district in the treacherous hills of the Pondaung range. His influence included Pagyi and Pakhangyi area as well with prominent followers such as Myingyan (Tayokmyo) Myowun U Kyaw Gaung under him. By 1887, he had extended his resistance activities into the Yaw country and then the Chin Hills. In one of the raids within the Pagyi region, Bo Sawba attacked and carried off the body of U Po O, a nephew of Kinwun Mingyi, who had surrendered his allegiance to the British. U Tha Gyi, another local man of influence defected from the British and joined in the resistance.

=== Bayingan Prince ===
At the same time of the Shwegyobyu Prince attacks, the Bayingan (Viceroy) Prince also arose along with resistance movements that started in Mandalay and eventually moving north into Sagaing. In September 1887 he moved into the Pagyi region, establishing contacts with Shwegyobyu Prince and in particular, U Tha Gyi. The combined forces of both princes became a serious threat to the British. On 8 October 1887, the British then sent a force of 21 mounted Military Police and a detachment of the 2nd Hyderabad Contingent Infantry to surprise and suppress U Tha Gyi and the Bayingan Prince. U Thai Gyi and the Bayingan Prince managed to escape to Chinbyit where a second British force attacked from Kyadet on 12 October. Eventually U Thai Gyi and Bayingan were killed but not without also taking the lives of Major Kennedy, commander of the British Force, and Captain Beville, assistant commander of Chindwin district.

=== Kyimyindaing Prince ===
In early 1886, the Kyimyindaing Prince started off his resistance movement in Ava district before establishing himself in the area around Mahlaing. In March 1886, his forces took on British troops marching from Pagan to Yamethin via Mahlaing and Meiktila. He then combined forces with leaders like Yamethin Lewun, Theingon Thugyi, Buddhayaza and Thihaya when he moved south. Their forces managed to disrupt the communications of the British in Pyinmana. However, the British moved swiftly against the Prince and his forces, attacking his camp on 12 November 1886. The Kyimyindaing Prince was forced to withdraw but not without killing a British officer, Lieutenant Eckersley of the Somersetshire Regiment. British counter-attacks forced the Prince to retreat to Ywangan state where he and his men fought their last battle stoically till the last man standing.

=== Setkya Prince ===
Initially starting his resistance movement from his base in Mandalay District, he moved to Maw, the Myelat state on the southeast border of Kyaukse at the end of 1887. This was followed by attacks from the British with the support of the Maw Ngwegunhmu. The Setkya prince was forced to withdraw east in 1888, establish a large following and making incursions into Kyauke district. He did some damage to the Military Police but was eventually captured by the Sawbwa of Lawksawk who handed him over to the British to be executed.

=== Bo Swe ===
Although in his fifties by the time of annexation, Bo Swe, the hereditary Thugyi of Mindat continued to fight against the British. He established his power in the region west of Minbu, between the Irrawaddy and Arakan hills. By December 1885, Bo Swe and his forces attacked a police station on the west frontier and subsequently moving into Malun township in 1886. Over there, he encountered the forces of Captain Rolland and 25 men from the Royal Scots Fusiliers. After which, Bo Swe retreated into the Arakan Yomas.

He emerged once again in May 1886 to attack Kani with 150 men. The British then came in from Pyilongyaw on 17 May and Bo Swe was forced to withdraw again to Yaw. However, this time the retreat was for tactical purposes so that he could organize his men more effectively. The British, at that time, set a bounty of Rs. 1,000 for the head of Bo Swe, which increased to Rs. 5,000 towards the end of 1887. Nevertheless, Bo Swe was unfazed. When in June 1886, the British attacked Bo Swe's position at Padein with a force of 50 Military Police; Bo Swe was able to repel the attacks with reinforcement. The British commander Phayre was shot and killed in the skirmish and Bo Swe managed to hold his position at Padein. To salvage the loss of their commander, the British then sent reinforcements from Pagan led by Major Gordan with 95 rifles of the 2nd Bengal Infantry, 50 rifles of the Liverpool Regiment and 2 artillery pieces. On 19 July, Major Gordon's forces clashed with BoSwe's at a position near Ngape. Bo Swe eventually withdrew but not without inflicting losses of 8 killed and 26 wounded on the British side. Finding their strength rather deficient at Ngape, the British withdrew in July 1886, allowing Bo Swe to once again regroup and reconsolidate his forces in the region.

After the Ngape incident, the British decoded to change tactics. They tried to win Bo Swe over to their side with the promise that he would be appointed Extra Assistant Commissioner 5th Grade at Ngape should he give himself up with his men and capture U Ottama. There was a further proviso that he would not be charged for the murder of Phayre. Nevertheless, Bo Swe refused. Incensed, the British increased their cavalry and mounted infantry forces at Ngape, systematically rooting out Bo Swe's resistance base. Finally, Bo Swe made a last ditched effort at repelling the British forces in a ravine near Milangon in Thayetmyo district. He died a valiant death of fighting with only 10 of his men as compared to the more numerous mounted South Wales Borderers led by Major Harvey.

=== Bo Ya Nyun ===
Bo Ya Nyun was the chief horseman of Welaung in Myingyan district. This district was well known for the high caliber of its cavalry. Due to his official position and his natural leadership ability, Bo Ya Nyun was able to gather a large following. Throughout the years 1887 and 1888, Bo Ya Ngun would carry out guerilla tactics on the British. Whenever the enemy forces were too great, he would retreat into the jungles around Popa. By 1889 Bo Ya Ngun had reconsolidated enough strength to establish himself formally at Welaung, launching attacks on the British from there. The British used the same tactics of offering amnesty in order to co-opt him but Bo Ya Nyun refused. However, some troops under him were taken in by the British offer. By 1890, Bo Ya Ngun's resistance eventually crumbled and he surrendered to the British on 30 May 1890.

=== U Ottama ===
In 1886, upon receiving orders from the Myinzaing Prince, U Ottama together with U Thaung collected man and arms on both sides of the Man Creek to prepare for battle with the British. Several thugyis, including 600 to 700 mean joined their resistance forces. On 17 February, their forces attacked and took over Sagu. However, the British attacked back, pushing into Sagu and further into Pyilongyaw, raiding U Ottama's monastery. By this time both U Ottama and U Thaung had escaped to Pauk. The British then requested for their surrender at Salin before 14 April. They refused and with 40–50 men from Pyilongyaw and 500–600 men under Bo Shwe Tha of Warabyin and Bo Lu Gyi of Kan, together with the thugyis of Ngakwe, Kawton and Thechaung villages, they conducted an active campaign in the Salin and Sale districts. Fighting broke out on 13 March with a British force under Captain Dunsford at Kyaukpon, after which U Ottama retreated back again towards Pauk. By then, U Ottama's strength had increased considerably after he had managed to enter into a successful communication with the forces under Bo Swe.

On 12 June 1886, the British started an attack near U Ottama's position at Salin. U Ottama's men killed Captain Dunsford and then besieging the British forces at Salin. The siege was broken by a relieving British force but only after the Burmese had killed its commander again, Captain Atkinson. Riding on his success, U Ottama reconsolidated his forces in the Minbu region. He then assumed the title of Mingyi and appointed five lieutenants – Bo Yaw Baw, Bo Kan Thi, U Ottara, Bo Kin and Bo Byaing Gyi – to take over villages under his domain. Theirs was a successful stronghold with the British not being able to make any progress infiltrating without U Ottama knowing their movements well in advance. The British then resorted to means of persuading and even buying over U Ottama's followers, at the same time imposing severe penalties for those villagers who aided or abetted the resistance leaders. Gradually, these tactics succeeded and 1,204 of U Ottama's men surrendered to the British. U Ottama himself was finally captured by the British near Legaing in June 1889.

== Resistance in Lower Burma ==
=== Mayanchaung Pongyi ===
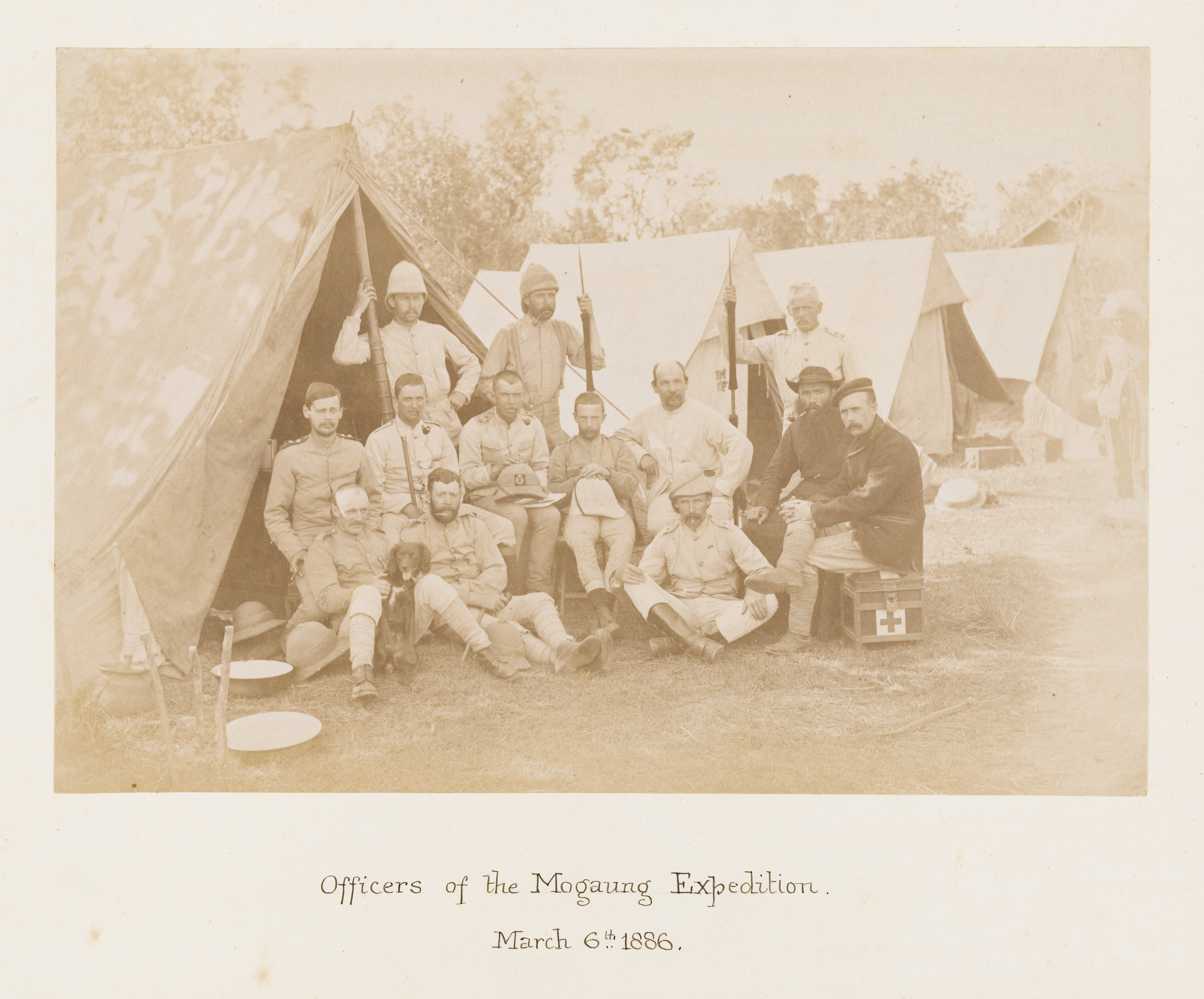
Officers of the 1886 Mogaung Expedition.

A Shan, Mayanchaung Pongyi was first appointed by King Thibaw to increase the intensity of revolt in Lower Burma before the outbreak of war. He subsequently roped in the help of Kyaukkalat, Pekkaleit and Shwehle Pongyis to stir up revolt in the region. After the fall of Mandalay, Mayanchaung Pongyis’ men made a simultaneous attack on Sittang, Winbadaw and Karawe on 15 December 1885. The very next day, the group proceeded to cut the telegraph lines at Thayethamein while another, led by a pongyi, captured Bilin. Another force also attacked Kyaikhto while a force of 300–500 mean attack on Shwegyin, the district headquarters. The attack was repulsed by British reinforments from Toungoo. Nevertheless, another of wave attack began again at Kyaikkaw, breaching the Abya embankment and destroyed the lock gates at Myitkyo.

By then, Symes had already posted a reward of Rs. 5,000 for the capture of Mayanchaung Pongyi. The British also started to reinforcement their strength at Shwegyin with an officer and 45 men of the Royal Scots Fusiliers and an officer and 100 of the 1st Bombay Grenadiers, while at Sittang there were 3 officers and 73 men of the Royal Scots Fusiliers, 2 officers and 65 men of the 1st Bombay Grenadiers and an officer and 50 men of the 5th Madras Infantry. There was also a Moulmein column with one officer and 175 men of the 9th Madras Infantry. Meanwhile, Mayanchaung Pongyi had established contact with U Po Min and U Min, sons of the old Kyaukkyi Mingyi, while appointing U Po Min Myowun and U Min thugyi of Kyaukki. Resistance then broke out in several places all at once in Kyaukkyi. Mayanchaung Pongyi by then had fled north to Yathaung, 30 miles northeast of Sittang, gathering a force as many as 300 to 800. From there, the main body moved on to Binban near Bilin while another detachment, estimated at 100 to 400, established themselves at Taungthalezeik, a betel depot 17 to 20 miles southeast of Shwegyin. On 11 January 1886, Major Robinson and 70 men advanced to meet with Mayanchaung Pongyi but were ambushed. Major Robinson was wounded badly while some of his men were killed. The British then increased their forces and Mayanchaung Pongyi was forced to retreat into the hills of Toungoo. Eventually, he was captured on 10 March 1886 and publicly hanged in front of Kyaikto police station.

== Resistance in the Shan Hills ==
=== The Limbin Confederacy ===
The Limbin Confederacy, a union of Shan Sawbas and Myosas, had its origins before British annexation of Upper Burma when the Shan States refused to submit under the authority of King Thibaw, plotting to replace him with another suzerain who would repeal the Thathameda tax. They selected a disenfranchised prince of the house of Alaungpaya, also known as the Limbin prince to be their representative. However, the formation of the confederacy was still in its infancy when Mandalay had fallen to the British. Nevertheless, the immediate confrontation of the Limbin Confederacy was not with the British but with the chiefs against the recalcitrant Sawbas to Kengtung. The British managed to exploit this local feud to reinstate their control over the Shan hills. A few of the Shan Sawbas resisted while many defected to the British side. One by one, townships within the Shan states fell into British hands. Stubborn resistance fighters such as the Sawbas of Lawksawk and Mongnai put up a valiant fight, however they too crumbled under British guile and force. The break-up of the Limbin Confederacy eventually forced the Limbin Prince to submit. He was then taken to Calcutta where he stayed until 1912. He returned to Rangoon permanently in 1921, living in a house there free of charge and given a monthly grant of 16 pounds. He died in 1933.

== Resistance in the Kachin Hills ==
=== U Po Saw ===
Formerly the descendant of a family of local influence in the Mogaung area, U Po Saw launched an attack on the British garrison along with widespread Kachin support. He met with strong British resistance consisting of 50 rifles of the Cheshire Regiment, 101 rifles of the Kalati Ghilzai Regiment, 500 rifles of the Bhamo Military Police, 25 Mounted Infantry and 2 mountain guns led by Captain Triscott whom had previously settled in on 14 January 1888. After a series of small-scale skirmishes, U Po Saw assembled over 400 men, mostly Shans of Kamaing, Mogaung and Uyu Seywa on the night of 20 May 1888, occupying the town of Mogaung. In this engagement, they lost 49 men but had also inflicted a loss of 8 men killed and 15 wounded on the British side.

With that loss of the British, they regrouped swiftly. In October 1888, a sanction was given to increase the size of the Moguang garrison with 200 men from Bhamo and two more mountain guns. At the same time, letters of ultimatum were sent to the Sama and Panga Duwas requiring them to make a formal submission and to surrender U Po Saw and his lieutenant, Bo Ti. The British then mounted a military offensive in three successive expeditions in the years 1888–1889 with a column of 51 rifles of the Hampshire Regiment, 320 of the Mogaung Levy and two mountain guns under Captain O’Donnell. The British then occupied Kamaing on 11 January 1889, then Sama and finally Muklon. The resistance movement of U Po Saw was finally routed by 1889 with the Kachins offering stiff resistance throughout. Citation needed.

=== Wuntho Sawbas ===
The Wuntho sawbas consisted of a father and son team. The father, U Shwe Tha, was made Sawba of Wuntho previously in 1866 until he relinquished his position in favor of his son in 1881, U Aung Myat. Both father and son were brought up in the Burmese court and had pledged their loyalties to the Konbaung monarch. When the British occupied Mandalay, U Aung Myat thus refused to surrender. A column of 400 men was hence sent in January 1887 to Tatlwin Pass captured both U Aung Myat and U Shwe Tha. After prolonged negotiation, U Aung Myat submitted but it was merely a façade. U Aung Myat's men still resisted and by January 1891, skirmishes broke out formerly again. Havoc broke out in the towns of Kawlin and Kyaukpintha. By this time, U Shwe Tha had retreated to Mansi. However, the overwhelming force of the British forced both father and son to find refuge in Tsanta in Yunnan province. With that, the Wuntho uprising was finally suppressed.

== Resistance in the Chin Hills ==
=== The Chin Tribes ===
The Tashons were a powerful and influential tribe among the Chins. Previously on 1 January 1887, the British had started to assert their control over Chin territory by deposing U Yit as Sawbwa of Kale and installing U Pa Gyi in his stead. They then ventured into Tashon country with the objective of negotiating a trade route to India through the China Hills as well as displaying their military dominance and prowess to U Tok San, U Tha Dun and the Shwegyobyu Prince, they launched an offensive against the British by raiding Indin on 4 May 1888. This was followed by incursions into the plain in which the towns Sihuang and Homalin were targeted. By this time, the Siyins, another Chin tribe, had joined in the resistance, with them attacking Chitpauk on 17 October and Kantha on 22 September. Other tribes like the Soktes and Kamhaus also took the opportunity to attack the Kabaw valley, destroying Khamput in their wake.

Facing the growing threat from the chin tribes, a military expedition was launched into the Hills led by Brigadier-General Faunce, who established his headquarters at Kanpale on 3 December 1888 and assembled a force of 1,200. Meanwhile, attacks from the Tashons and Siyins continued unabated. The main British strategy however was to undermine Chin solidarity by driving a wedge between the Chins. They would only attack the Siyins and the Kamhaus, while the Tashons would be left alone. The very first objective was the occupation of Khuasak, the main Siyin village. They then continued their advance on Khausak with a force of 517 rifles and two mountain guns. Fierce fighting ensued whereby many villages of the Siyins and Kamhaus were destroyed. Having done that, the British then turned their attention to the Tashons.

With peaceful negotiations breaking down between the Tashons and British, the British decided to take on the offensive. Another military expedition was planned for 1889–1890, which was divided into two columns. The Northern Column was led by Colonel Skene who positioned his forces at Fort White with 1,622 men. The Southern Column, consisting of 1,869 men under Brigadier-General Symons, established themselves at Kan on 9 December 1889. These two columns would come to subdue the Tashons, Siyins, Hakha and Zokhuas. Fighting stretched all the way into 1891 when the Kamhaus finally submitted under superior British firepower. Sporadic outbreaks of resistance still occurred with the minority tribes with stubborn attacks by Siyin and other smaller tribes. The Siyins persisted to the last but was eventually subdued. Khup Pau, the Siyin chief and his son Khai Kam, finally surrendered on 16 May 1894. Still, the Chins were perceived to be the fiercest and strongest foe to the British advancement, having lasted for more than seven years.

== Aftermath ==
The resistance movement was not a unified one. It was the outcome of the sudden and humiliating fall of the Konbaung dynasty to the British. Many of the resistance were small-scale affairs - scattered, disorganized and without an eventual goal in sight except to struggle against a foreign enemy that was seen to be encroaching upon their land, religion and king. There were also many who have defected over to the side of the British. After almost ten years since 1885, the resistance movement was subdued. This was due primarily to four factors: 1) Better tactics of co-optation from the British; 2) More experienced and battle-hardened commanders were sent to reinforce the occupying British; 3) Superior weapons and war machinery of the British; 4) the targeting of the civilian population supporting the resistance movement by the British. There was an exception however: there were still periodic resistances from the Kachins which lasted until 1914–1915.
