= William Lockhart (Indian Army officer) =

British Indian Army general

General Sir William Lockhart GCB KCSI
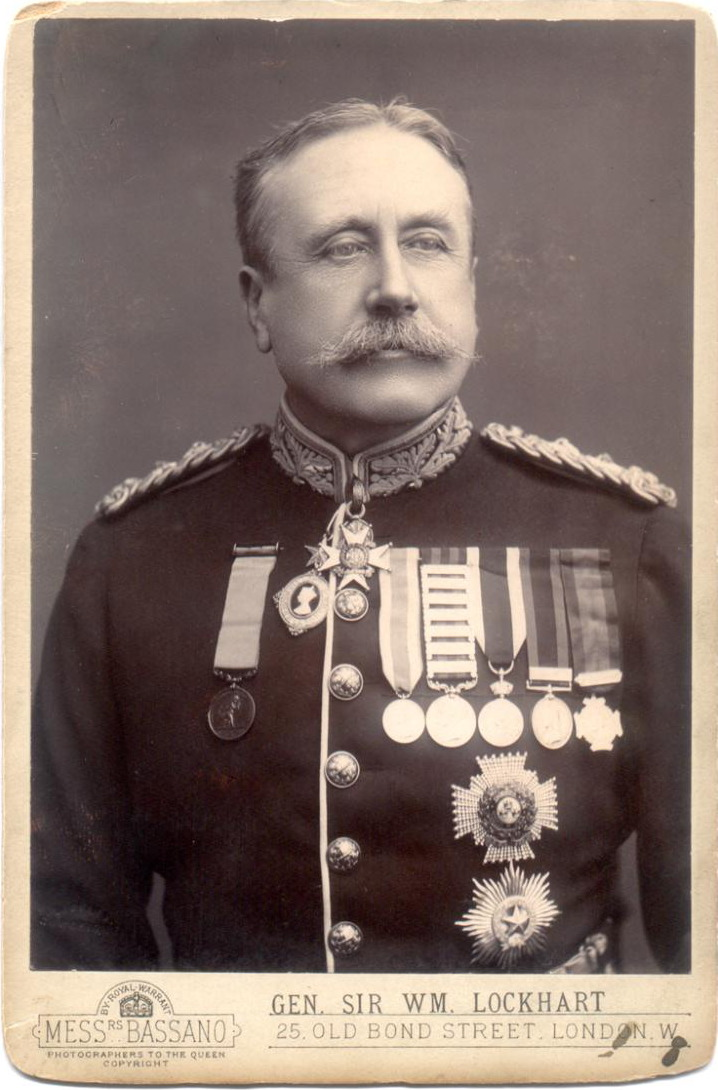
- Born: 2 September 1841; Inchinnan, Renfrewshire, Scotland
- Died: 18 March 1900 (aged 58)
- Military career
- Allegiance: United Kingdom
- Branch: British Indian Army
- Service years: 1858–1900
- Rank: General
- Commands: British Indian Army
- Awards: Knight Grand Cross of the Order of the Bath; Knight Commander of the Order of the Indian Empire

General Sir William Stephen Alexander Lockhart, GCB, KCSI (2 September 1841 – 18 March 1900) was a British General in the British Indian Army.

== Military career ==
Lockhart was born at the Manse in Inchinnan, Renfrewshire, Scotland, where his father Dr Laurence Lockhart, DD (1795–1876) was the minister. Lockhart's uncle was John Gibson Lockhart, eminent writer, poet and biographer of Sir Walter Scott. His mother Louisa Blair (died 1847) was a daughter of David Blair, a manufacturer in Glasgow. There were two older brothers who both also saw military service, Major-General David Blair Lockhart of Milton Lockhart (1829–1906) and Lieutenant-Colonel Laurence William Maxwell Lockhart (1831–1882).

He entered the Indian Army in 1858, in the 44th Bengal Native Infantry. He served in the last months of the Indian Mutiny, the Bhutan Campaign (1864–66), under Napier in the Abyssinian Expedition (1867–68; mentioned in dispatches) and after promotion to captain in 1868 took part in the Hazara Black Mountain Expedition (1868–69; mentioned in dispatches).

From 1869 to 1879 he acted as Deputy Assistant and Assistant Quartermaster General in Bengal. In 1877 he was promoted to major and was military attaché with the Dutch Army in Acheen (modern Aceh). Here he saw active service, almost died from fever, and received the Dutch Expedition Cross. He was Road Commandant of the Khyber Pass and served in the Second Anglo-Afghan War of 1878–80, for which he was mentioned in dispatches and made a Companion of the Order of the Bath (CB). From 1880 to 1885 he was Deputy Quartermaster-General in the Intelligence Branch at headquarters, during which he was promoted to colonel in 1883. Between 1885 and 1886 he headed the Lockhart Mission surveying the Hindu Kush. He commanded a brigade in the Third Burmese War (1886–87), and was made Knight Commander of the Order of the Bath (KCB) and a Companion of the Order of the Star of India (CSI) and received the thanks of the government.

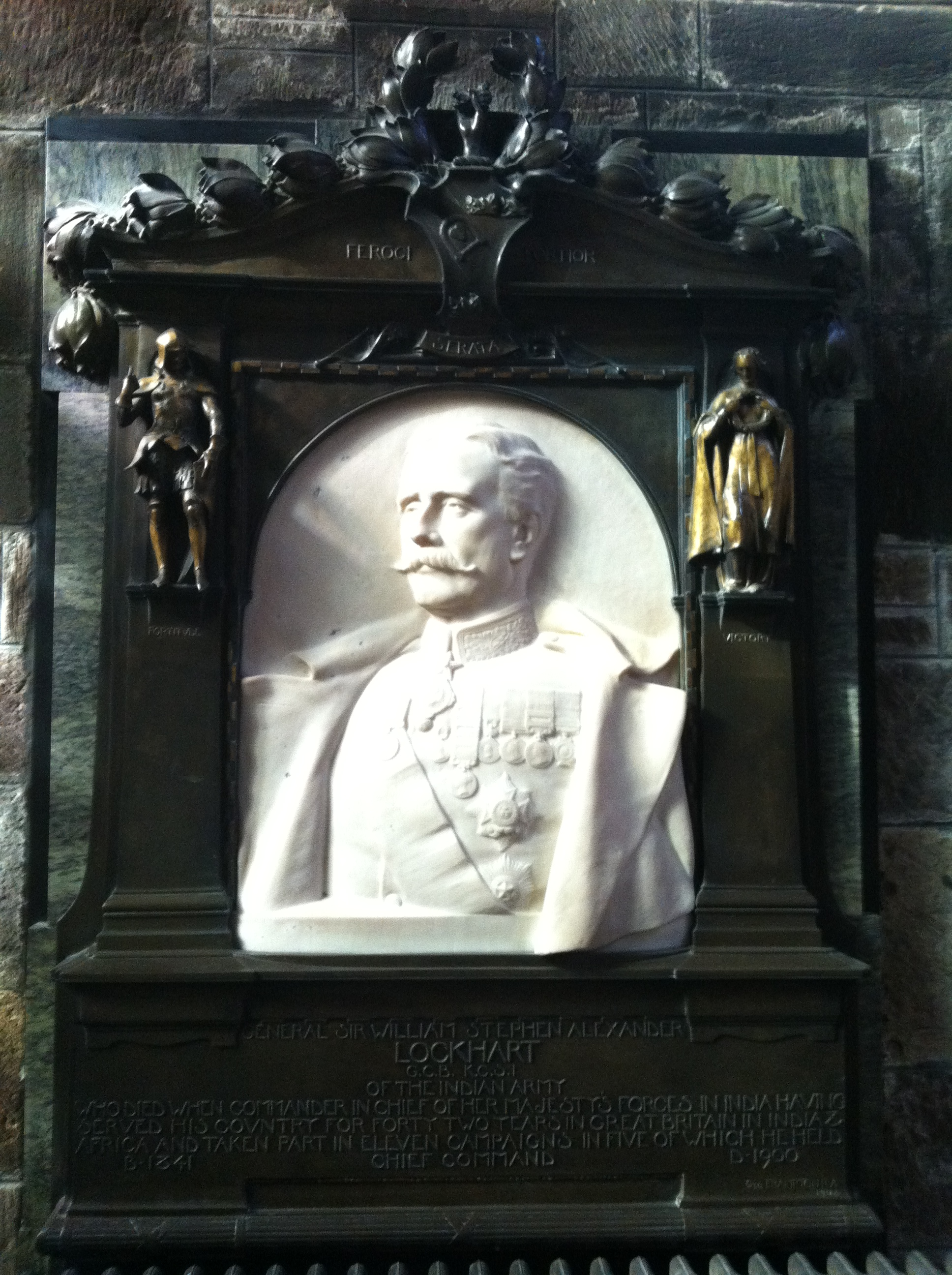
Memorial in St Giles Cathedral, Edinburgh

An attack of fever brought Lockhart to England in 1888, where he was employed as Assistant Military Secretary for Indian affairs (at Horse Guards); but in 1890 he returned to India earlier than planned to become Commander-in-Chief Punjab Command with the rank of major-general. He set up his home in Abbottabad and for five years was engaged in various expeditions against the hill tribes. After the Waziristan Campaign in 1894–95 he was made a Knight Commander of the Order of the Star of India (KCSI). He became a full general in 1896, and in 1897 he was given the command against the Afridis and Mohmands, and conducted the difficult Tirah Expedition with great skill. The Tirash Field Forces under his command left Kohat on 11 October 1897 and encountered forces at the major geographical obstacle of the heights above the village of Dargai. A narrow steep path it was defended by thousands of Afridis. On 18 October the heights wee briefly seized but his forces were forced to retreat against successful attacks by the Afridis. He ordered his forces to reattack on 20 October against several thousand enemy and the hill was recaptured, with the enemy forces dispersed.

He returned to England in 1898 and received the Knight Grand Cross of the Order of the Bath (GCB). Appointed Commander-in-Chief, India, he returned to India after a brief visit to Scotland. He took up residence in "Treasury Gate", Fort William, India and at "Snowdon" in Simla when the government migrated to the hill station for the summer months.

== Death ==
He died of malaria whilst serving in office in Calcutta on 18 March 1900. His funeral occurred the following day and the service was taken by James Welldon the Bishop of Calcutta, and former headmaster of Harrow School. Lockhart's good friend Lord Curzon (The Viceroy) attended the funeral. Lockhart married twice.

A private collection funded a fine memorial by George Frampton in St Giles' Cathedral, Edinburgh and soldiers and their families paid for the construction of an obelisk in Roomi Park, Rawalpindi (now Pakistan).

Military offices
Preceded by Sir Charles Nairne	Commander-in-Chief, India; 1898–1900	Succeeded by Sir Arthur Palmer
