= Sizang language =

Kuki-Chin language of Burma

Sizang
- Siyin
- Native to: Burma
- Ethnicity: Sizang
- Native speakers: 35,000 (2007)
- Language family: Sino-Tibetan: (Tibeto-Burman); Kuki-Chin; Northeastern; Sizang

Language codes
- ISO 639-3: csy
- Glottolog: siyi1240

Sizang (Sizang, Shiyang), or Siyin (Siyin Chin), is a Kuki-Chin language spoken by the Sizang people in southern Tedim Township, Chin State, Burma. A written script for Siyin was created in 1891 by Captain F.M. Rundal.
