= Arthur Power Palmer =

British Indian Army general

General Sir Arthur Power Palmer GCB GCIE
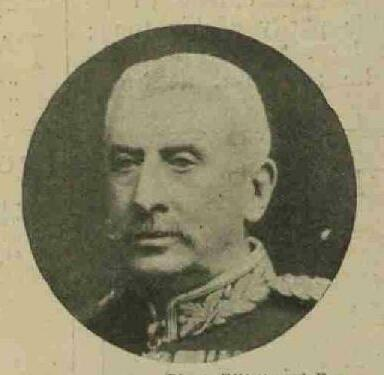
- Born: 25 June 1840; Kurubul, India
- Died: 28 February 1904 (aged 63); London, United Kingdom
- Burial place: Brompton Cemetery
- Military career
- Allegiance: United Kingdom
- Branch: British Indian Army
- Service years: 1857–1902
- Rank: General
- Commands: Indian Army
- Conflicts: Tirah Campaign
- Awards: Knight Grand Cross of the Order of the Bath; Knight Grand Commander of the Order of the Indian Empire

General Sir Arthur Power Palmer, GCB, GCIE (25 June 1840 – 28 February 1904) was Commander-in-Chief, India between March 1900 and December 1902.

== Military career ==
Power Palmer was born in June 1840, at Karnaul (Karnal), India, the son of Nicholas Palmer and Rebecca Carter Barrett. Educated at Cheltenham College, he was commissioned into the 5th Bengal Light Infantry in 1857. He took part in subduing the Indian Mutiny in 1857.

In 1880, he was appointed assistant adjutant-general in Bengal and in 1885 was commander of the 9th Bengal Cavalry for the Suakin Expedition. In 1897 he took part in the Tirah Campaign. He was also General Officer Commanding 2nd Division during the action at Chagru Kotal.

In January 1898, he became commander-in-chief Punjab Command, and on 19 March 1900 he became commander-in-chief of India after the sudden death of Sir William Lockhart, holding this post for two and a half years.

In a farewell dinner held at Simla in late October 1902, the Viceroy, Lord Curzon said the following about their relationship:

I believe an impression prevails in outside circles that either the Commander-in-Chief in India leads the viceroy by the nose, or, more rarely, the Viceroy leads the Commander-in-Chief. But there is a third alternative, which, after all, is more likely, and which my experience of two Commanders-in-Chief leads me unhesitatingly to endorse. It is that neither party is ahead of the other, but both are abreast.

I am confident that Sir A. Power Palmer will support me when I say that this has been the happy and unbroken nature of our collaboration.

(Lord Curzon would later clash with Palmer's successor, Lord Kitchener, and resign as a result.)

Palmer returned to the United Kingdom in December 1902, and was received in audience by King Edward VII in January 1903, when he was invested with the insignia of a Knight Grand Cross of the Indian Empire (GCIE), which he had received in the 1901 Birthday Honours. He retired from the Army the same year. He died in London in 1904 and is buried at Brompton Cemetery.

== Honours ==
- KCB: Knight Commander of the Order of the Bath
- GCB: Knight Grand Cross of the Order of the Bath
- GCIE: Knight Grand Commander of the Order of the Indian Empire – 9 November 1901 - King's birthday Honours

== Family ==
Palmer married in 1867 Julia Helen Aylmer née Harris (1848–1896) who died in October 1896 and is buried at the Old Christian Cemetery, Abbottabad, Pakistan. They had a daughter:

- Norah Blanche Aylmer Palmer (1872–?) who married Major Gerard Beechey Howard Rice (1865–?).

He remarried in 1898 Constance Gabrielle Richardson née Shaw (1864–1912), widow of Walter Milton Roberts. They had two daughters:

- Celia de Courcy Power-Palmer (1902–1973)
- Frances Gabrielle Power-Palmer (c. 1903 – 1987).

Their mother died in 1912, whereupon they were informally adopted by Horace Smith-Dorrien and his wife Olive, whose mother was their father's step-sister.

Military offices
Preceded by Sir William Lockhart	Commander-in-Chief, India; 1900–1902	Succeeded by Lord Kitchener
