= Chin Hills =

Mountain range in Myanmar and India

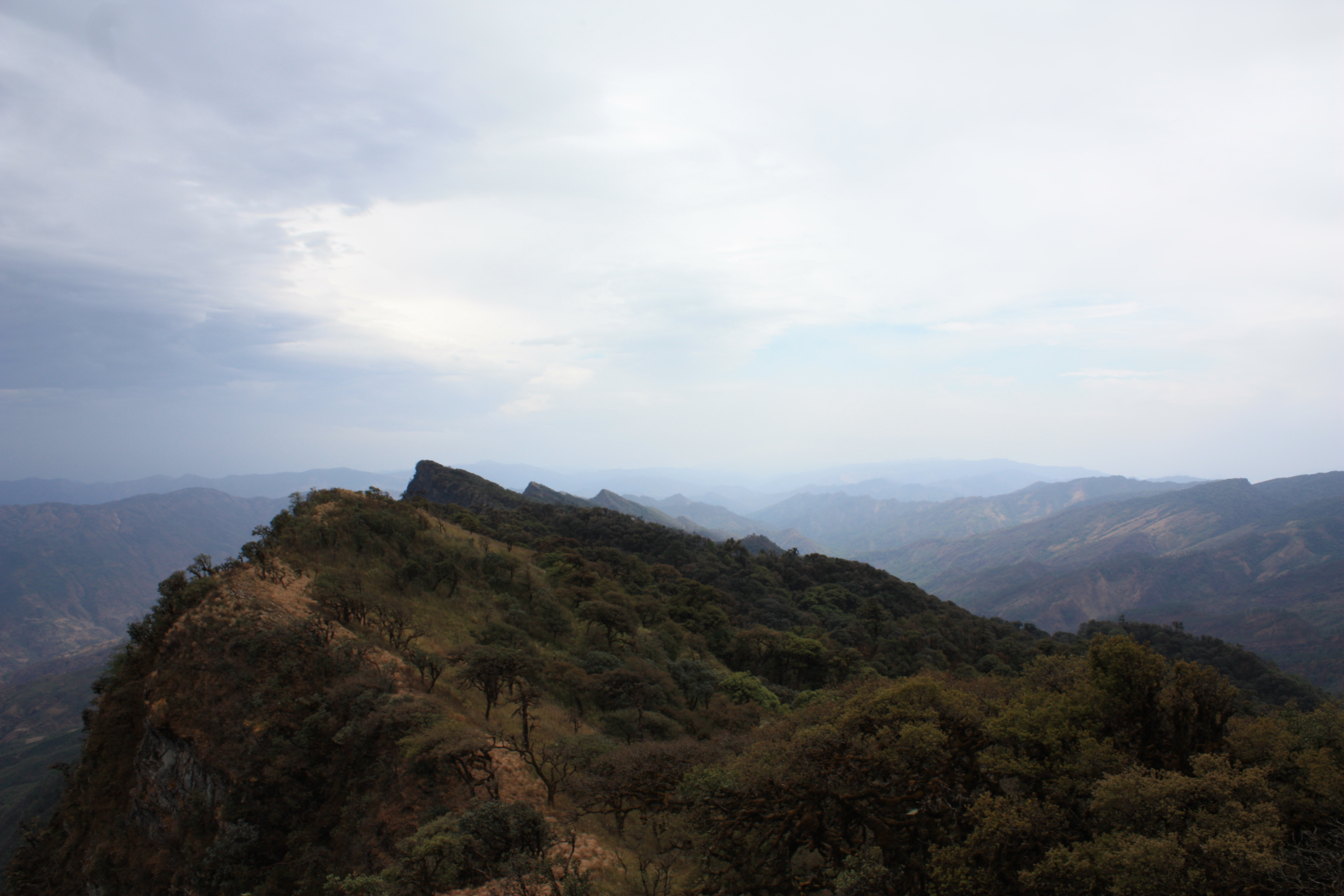
- Zinghmuh Tlang Tluan

Highest point
- Peak: Nat Ma Taung
- Elevation: 3,053 m (10,016 ft)
- Coordinates: 22°30′N 93°30′E

Geography
- Location within Myanmar
- Location: Chin State, Burma
- Parent range: Patkai Range

The Chin Hills are a range of mountains in Chin State, northwestern Myanmar, that extends northward into India's Manipur state.

== Geography ==
The highest peak in the Chin Hills is Khonu Msung, Nat Ma Taung, or Mount Victoria, in southern Chin State, which reaches 3,053 metres (10,016 ft). The Chin Hills–Arakan Yoma montane forests ecoregion has diverse forests with pine, camellia, and teak. Falam is the largest town in the Chin Hills, lying at their southern edge.

The Chin Hills are the eastern part of the Patkai Range, which includes the Lushai Hills and runs through Nagaland in India, as well as part of Burma. The Lushai Hills are frequently discussed with the Chin Hills as the topography, people's culture and history are similar. The southern prolongation of the Chin Hills is the Arakan Range (Arakan Yoma), stretching as well from north to south.

== History ==
Historically, the area of the range has been populated by the Chin people who like their neighbours to the west are a Laimi people. In addition to subsistence agriculture, the Chin raided the villages of the Burman on the plains of the Myittha and Chindwin rivers, as well as each other. In 1888, the British began a military campaign to end these raids which resulted in pacification of the province by 1896, and it was administratively added to Burma as a special division.

In the Second World War, the hills formed a point of armed conflict between Japanese forces and a combined British and Indian force.

== See also ==
- Arakan Mountains
- Chin Hills-Arakan Yoma montane forests
