= Hmar Ethnic Cultural Sites =

- Location in Pherzawl district
- Interactive map of Hmar Ethnic Cultural Sites
- Coordinates (Pherzawl): 24°15′N 93°11′E
- Country: India

The Hmar Ethnic Cultural Sites are a series of ethno-cultural sites of the Hmar people. These sites are located within Pherzawl district, Manipur, India. Popular sites include Sikpuilung, Thangngur Tawngtaina Puk, Zawllung, Lungthu Lien Pathum, Paruol Pasari Lungtat, Lalruong Lungkap and others.

== Pastor Thangngur Ṭawngṭaina Puk ==
Pastor Thangngur Ṭawngṭâina Pûk
- Ethno-Cultural Site
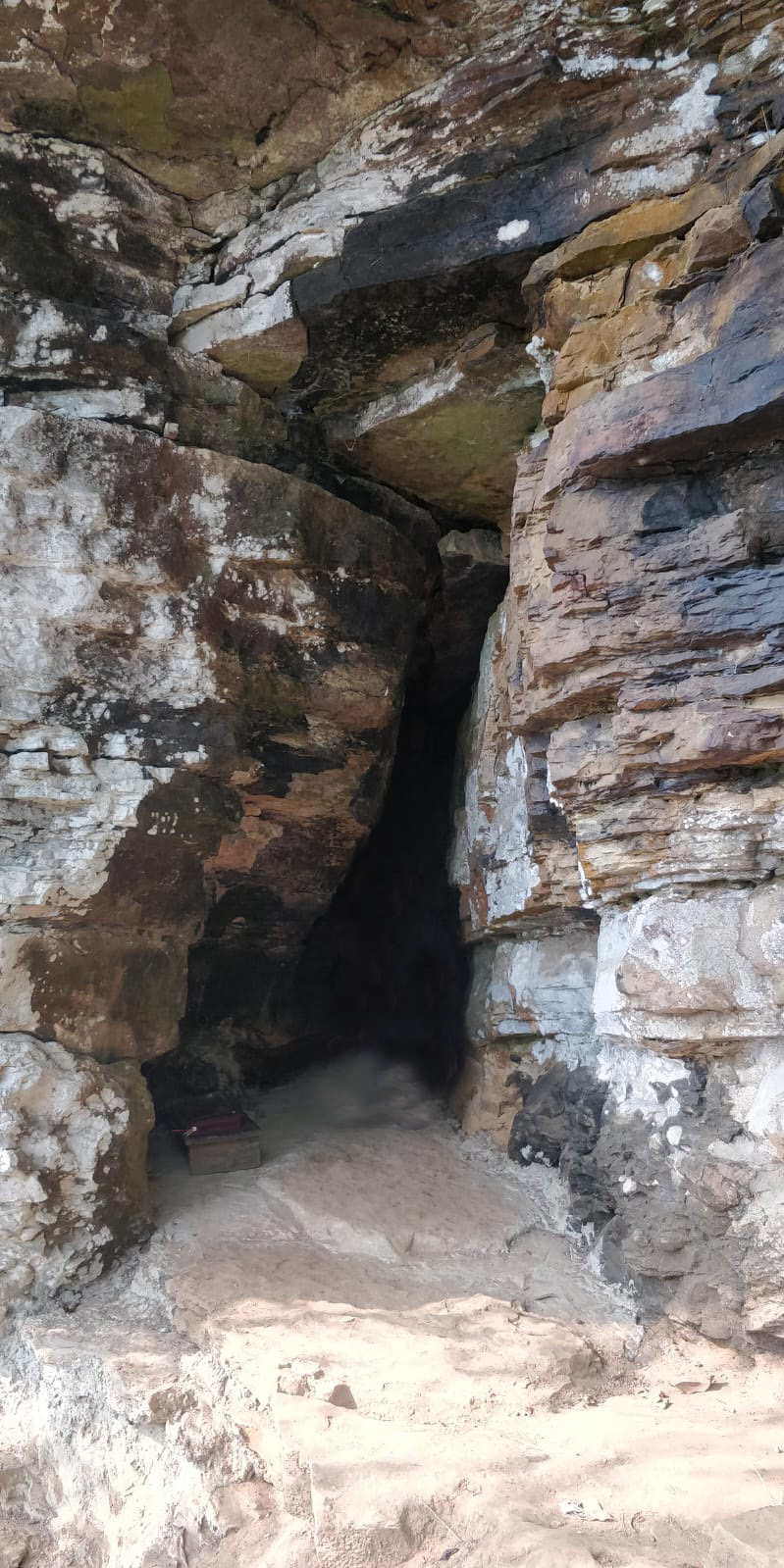

- Location in Manipur, India Pastor Thangngur Ṭawngṭâina Pûk (India)
- Coordinates: 24.38611°N 93.09598°E
- Country: India
- State: Manipur
- District: Pherzawl District

=== Historical Background of Thangngur ===
Thangngur, born in 1891, was a 'significant' figure among the Hmar people, particularly known for his conversion to Christianity in 1910. Employed as a teacher-evangelist and later ordained as a pastor, he played various roles within the church, eventually becoming the Field Superintendent of the Independent Church in 1943. He died on December 20, 1943. Born in Laileng, Mizoram, Thangngur's family later moved to Senvawn, a pivotal location for the early spread of Christianity in the region. His encounter with Watkin Roberts, a missionary, led to his conversion and subsequent education in a basic school.

In Hmar Bungpui Pastor Thangngur (A biography on Thangngur), it is written as follows:

Despite the challenges of balancing work and studies, Thangngur persevered, dedicating himself to learning. Thangngur's journey included employment as a teacher-evangelist and significant involvement in the Independent Church, which faced challenges and opposition, particularly from H.H. Coleman. Despite offers of comfort and stability from Coleman, Thangngur remained loyal to his beliefs, leading to personal hardships but unwavering faith. In 1932, Thangngur relocated to Phulpui, where he experienced profound spiritual encounters, shaping his prolific hymn-writing and strengthening his resolve. Despite facing poverty and trials, his faith remained steadfast, exemplified by his willingness to share his meager resources with others in need. His hymns, infused with deep spiritual insights and reflections on life's struggles and triumphs, continue to inspire and resonate across communities. Thangngur's experiences, including encounters with Jesus and divine interventions, are woven into his hymns, which reflect themes of faith, perseverance, and the enduring love of God. Thangngur's legacy lives on through his hymns, which transcend linguistic and cultural boundaries, uniting believers in worship and celebration. His life, marked by dedication to his faith and service to others, serves as a testament to the enduring power of spirituality and the human spirit.

— John H. Pulamte, Hmar Bungpui Pastor Thangngur (2011)

=== Pastor Thangngur Ṭawngṭâina Pûk ===
Translated as "Pastor Thangngur's Prayer Cave." It is located in Phulpui, Pherzawl district. Lalthlamuong Keivom wrote:

Deprived of his teaching position, Thangngur migrated to his own village, Phulpui in 1932. There he had a daily rendezvous with God in what came to be known as his prayer cave today about a furlong from the village where he prayed regularly. It was here in Phulpui that angels reportedly visited him several times and introduced him to the spiritual world beyond the realm of material consciousness. He vividly depicted some of his enthralling experiences in his crystal choral piece Jordan ral (Beyond Jordan). Major bulk of his works flowed out from here making this insignificant village a preponderant place in the Independent Church history. He achieved his spiritual as well as poetic heights from this humble place.

— L. Keivom & David Buhril, Biethu: Selected Writings of Keivom & Buhril (2020)

== Vawmpalung ==
Vawmpalung
- Ethno-Cultural Site
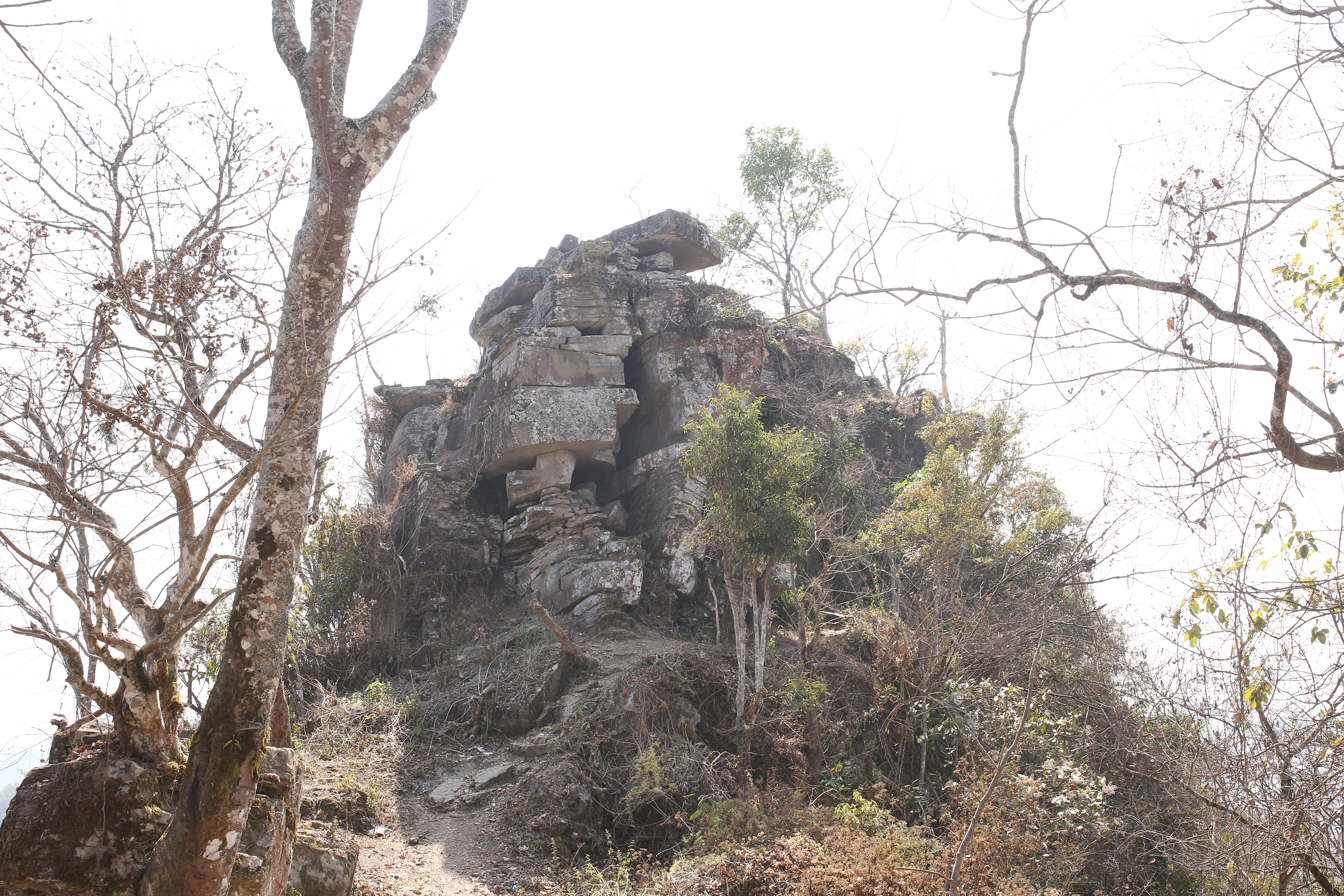

- Location in Manipur, India Vawmpalung (India)
- Coordinates: 24.20351°N 93.08137°E
- Country: India
- State: Manipur
- District: Pherzawl District

Lal Dena narrates it this way:

This rocky cliff, known as Vawmpalung, holds a tale of two lovers, Vawmpa and Vawmnu, who sought refuge there to share their moments of happiness away from their villages. Tragically, they fell from the cliff and perished together, 'bound forever' even in death. The story begins with a young man named Zakap, residing in Rbudâpzawl village, and a beautiful woman named Zosiel from nearby Lohawi village. Despite Zakap's dark complexion, he was affectionately called Vawmpa. Zakap and Zosiel were deeply in love, but their relationship became the subject of village gossip, causing distress to Zosiel's family and jealousy among the young men of Lohawi. Despite warnings and violence from the villagers, Zakap continued to visit Zosiel, further fueling her affection for him. In desperation, Zakap and Zosiel decided to flee and seek refuge at the high cliff now known as Vawmpalung. Here, they enjoyed moments of intimacy, sometimes sitting atop the flat stone under the moonlight. The cliff's unique features, including two protruding flat rocks and a deep chasm between them, became the backdrop of their shared experiences. Legends speak of their jumping competitions and a flat rock resembling a bed where they spent nights together. A hole in the cliff once held Zakap's gun. Despite their attempts to remain hidden, their love couldn't endure separation. Tragically, they chose to end their lives by jumping from the protruding flat rock, forever uniting in death. Today, Vawmpalung stands as a 'testament' to their 'enduring' love, much like the Taj Mahal of Agra.

== Sartuinek and Hringtuinek ==
=== Sârtuinêk ===
Sartuinek
- Ethno-Cultural Site
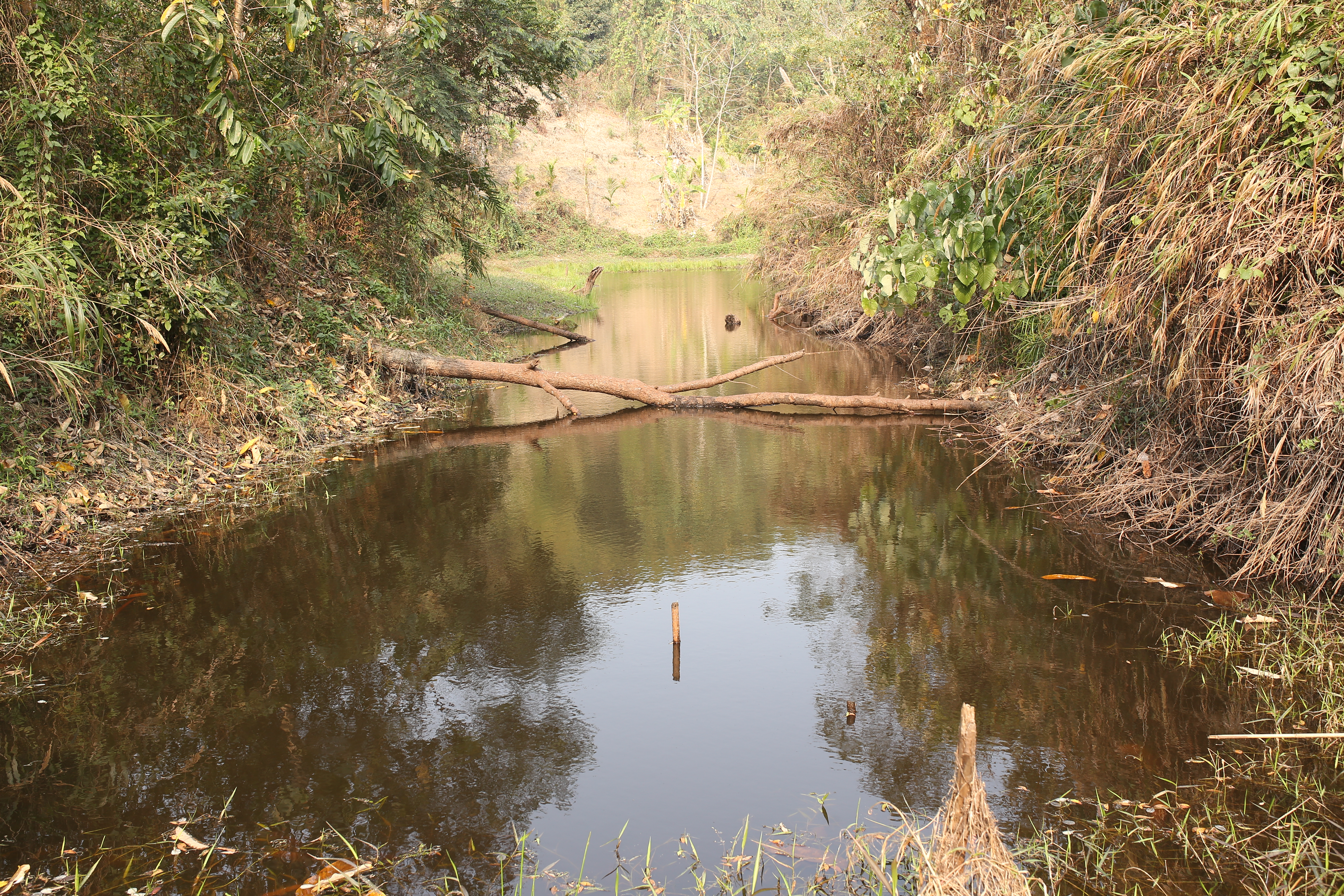

- Location in Manipur, India Sartuinek (India)
- Coordinates: 24.28703°N 93.03603°E
- Country: India
- State: Manipur
- District: Pherzawl District

Sârtuinêk is a pond believed by the Hmars to be associated with the spirits of individuals who died in circumstances deemed 'unnatural'. The nearby village is referred to as Sartuinek in accordance with this belief. In Hmar tradition, deaths are categorized into two types: sârthi (unnatural) and thi pangngâi (natural). Sârthi deaths encompass accidents such as falling from a tree, drowning, murder, suicide, and death caused by wild animals. It is believed that the spirits of those who died unnatural deaths pass through this pond, known as Sârtuinêk, where they purportedly drink its water. Consequently, the village is named after this pond. Subsequently, according to tradition, the spirits continue their journey towards Mithikhuo (world of the dead) via Thlânpielkawt near Khawlêk in Mizoram.

=== Hringtuinêk ===
Hringtuinek
- Ethno-Cultural Site
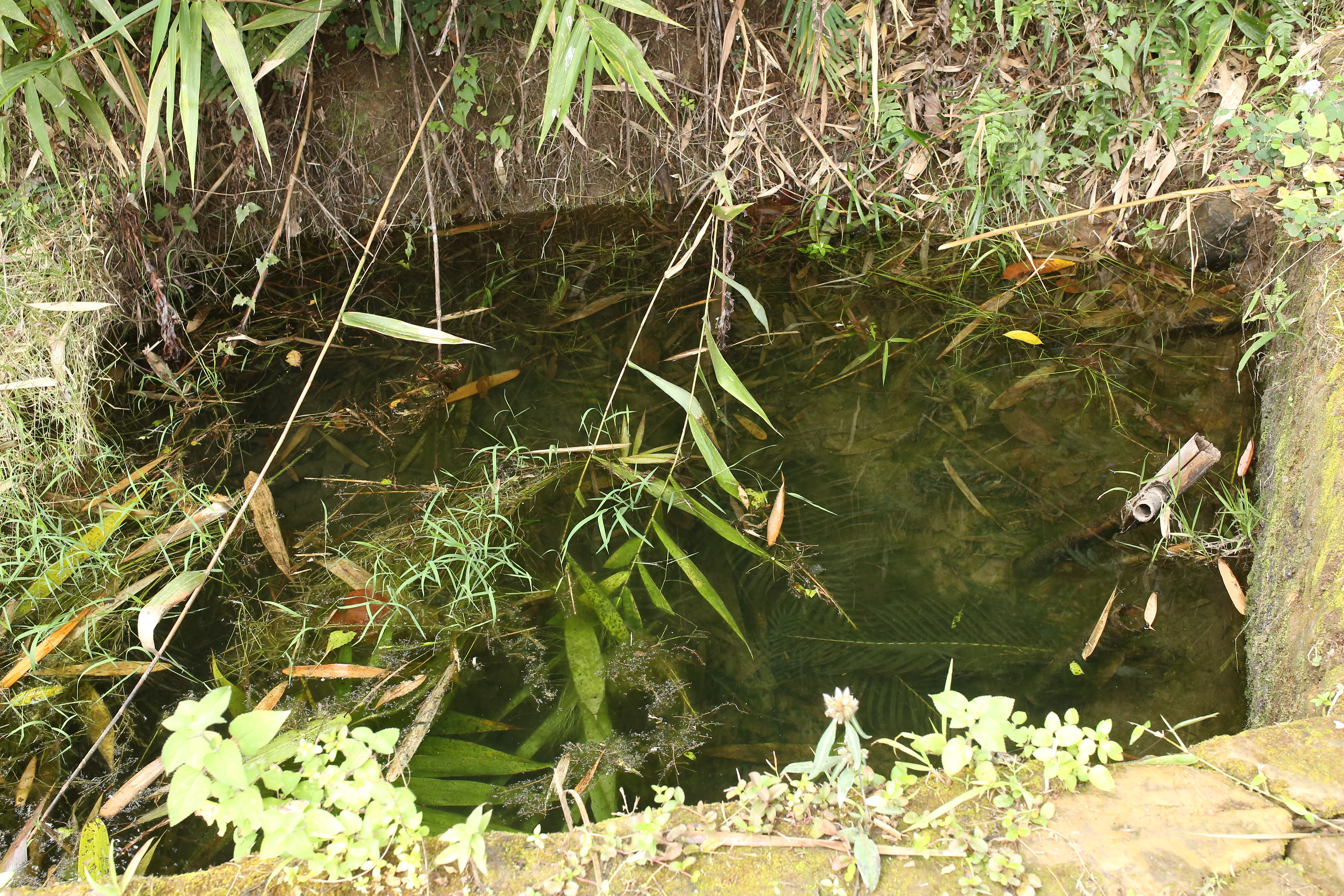

- Location in Manipur, India Hringtuinek (India)
- Coordinates: 24.28677°N 93.09598°E
- Country: India
- State: Manipur
- District: Pherzawl District

Hringtuinêk is a pond believed to be associated with the spirits of individuals who died natural deaths, according to the beliefs of the Hmar people in the pre-Christian era. They held the belief that all spirits of those who died from natural causes, including deaths at birth, would pass through this pond and drink its water. Consequently, the pond is named Hringtuinêk. Following this ritual, the spirits would proceed to Thlânpielkawt near Khawlêk in Mizoram, continuing their journey towards Mithikhuo (world of the dead). It was believed that before the Hmar people embraced Christianity, only the spirits of Thangsuos were granted direct entry into pielrâl, a concept akin to paradise.

== Lungthu Lien Pathum ==
Lungthu Lien Pathum
- Ethno-Cultural Site
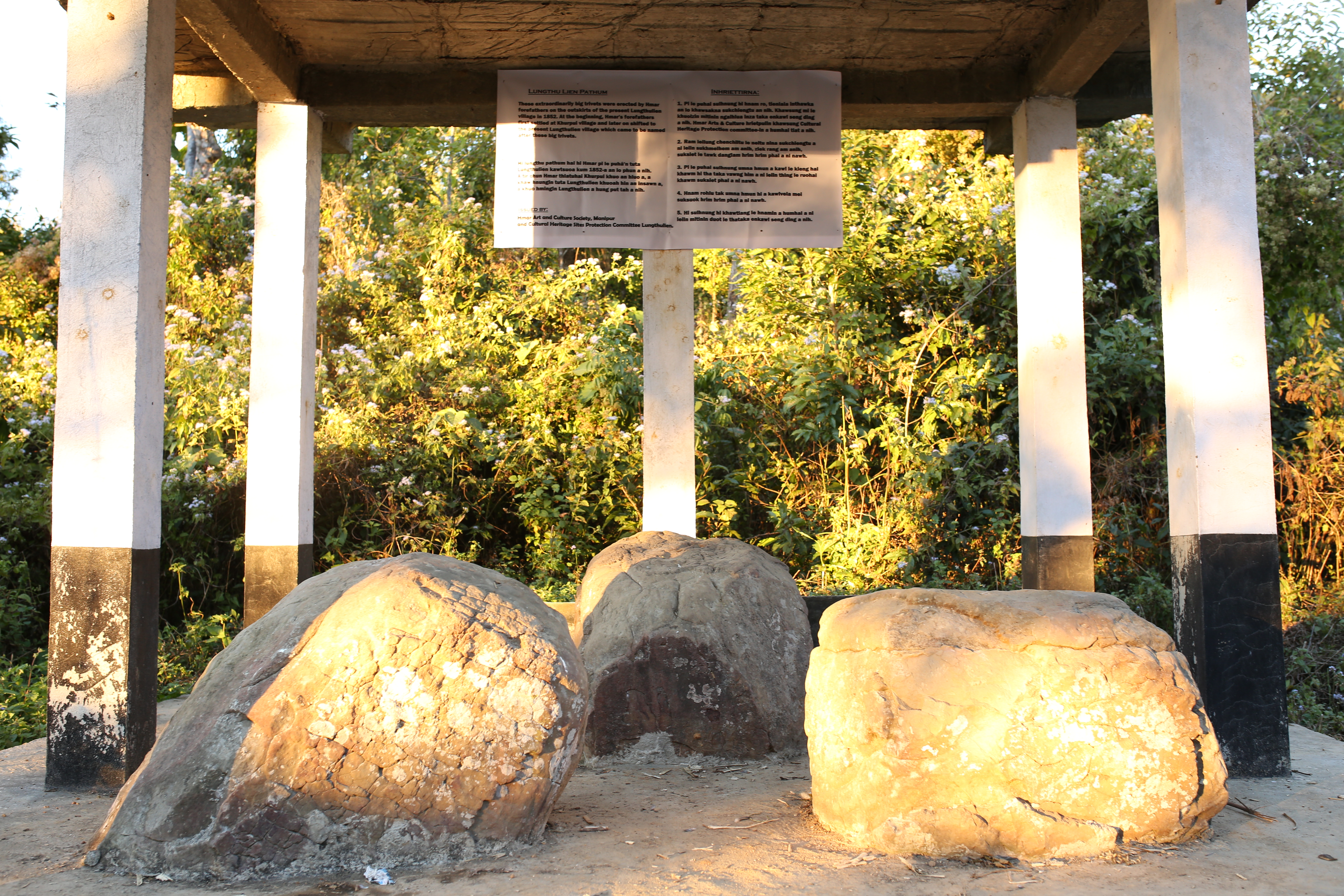

- Location in Manipur, India Lungthu Lien Pathum (India)
- Coordinates: 24.21729°N 93.08741°E
- Country: India
- State: Manipur
- District: Pherzawl District

The large trivets, erected by the ancestors of the Hmar people, stand on the outskirts of present-day Lungthulien village, believed to have been constructed around 1852. Originally, the Hmar ancestors settled in Khurpui village before relocating to what is now Lungthulien village, which derived its name from these significant structures. Led by figures such as Ngurzika, Ngurthanga, Kalphunga, Hrangkapa, and Khuonghmuna, the Hmar forefathers briefly resided in Ibudâpzâwl, near the present Lungthulien village, before seeking a more favorable settlement location. They eventually settled in Khurpui, attracted by the presence of a perennial water pond. During their time in Khurpui, around 1852, the Hmar ancestors erected three large trivets, each weighing more than four or five mounds. These trivets were likely intended to symbolize the strength and stature of the Hmar ancestors, with stories recounting the legendary strength of individuals like Khuplal Sawngate of Parbung, who reputedly could effortlessly lift and reposition the trivets. The construction of these trivets served as a marker of the Hmar presence in the region. Over time, as the Hmar community interacted with the British in the late 18th century, some clans settled in Hmunte, situated between Senvawn and Lungthulien. By 1924, a significant number of Hmar clans, alongside Singson clans of the Thado tribes, migrated to Kâwnzâr, later known as Senvawn. Concurrently, another group of Hmarclans joined their kin who had already established themselves in Lungthulien village.

== Paruol Pasarihai Lungtat ==
Paruol Pasarihai Lungtat
- Ethno-Cultural Site
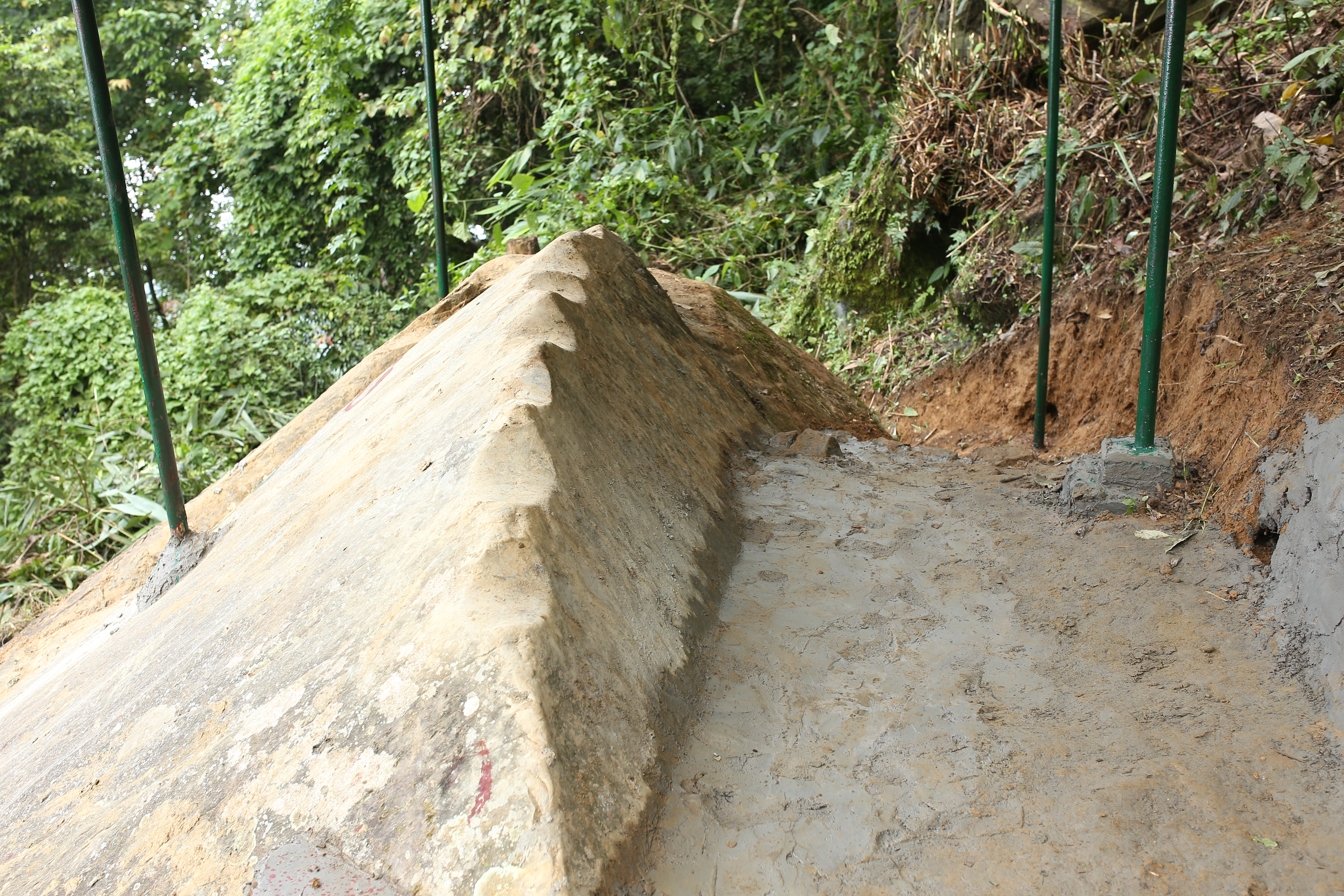

- Location in Manipur, India Paruol Pasarihai Lungtat (India)
- Coordinates: 24.41197°N 93.09524°E
- Country: India
- State: Manipur
- District: Pherzawl District

The Paruol pasarihai Lungtat (translated as The Seven Brothers' Whetstone) holds significance as a historical site within the forested area of Ngampabung. It is known to have been utilized by a particular seven brothers for sharpening their weapons, including spears and daos, prior to engaging in hunting and other adventurous endeavors. In the cultural context of the Hmar people, the whetstone held considerable importance, being considered an essential tool in their daily lives. During periods marked by frequent intra or inter-tribal conflicts, tools, instruments, and weapons held importance for survival. The whetstone, regardless of its size or appearance, emerged as a vital component in their day-to-day struggles. Whether embarking on hunting expeditions, clearing jungles for cultivation, or undertaking adventurous exploits, the sharpening of tools on whetstones was a customary practice among the Hmar people. Thus, in many Hmar household, whetstones of various sizes were commonly found. Additionally, smooth stones protruding in wild forests and streams often served as makeshift whetstones for honing weapons, such as dao or arrows. According to Hmar oral traditions, the legendary Paruol pasari, comprising seven brothers, were 'renowned' figures believed to have traversed the forests of Ngampabung village within the Vangai ranges, as well as the surrounding areas within Ruonglevaisuo (Tipaimukh). The stone presented here, passed down through generations via oral narratives, is said to be the very whetstone utilized by the Paruol pasari during their hunting expeditions and daring adventures in the jungle. The Paruol pasari attained fame as skilled hunters and warriors, with their encounters with formidable beasts like tigers and elephants becoming enduring tales within Hmar society.

== Lalruong Lungkap ==
Lalruong Lungkap
- Ethno-Cultural Site
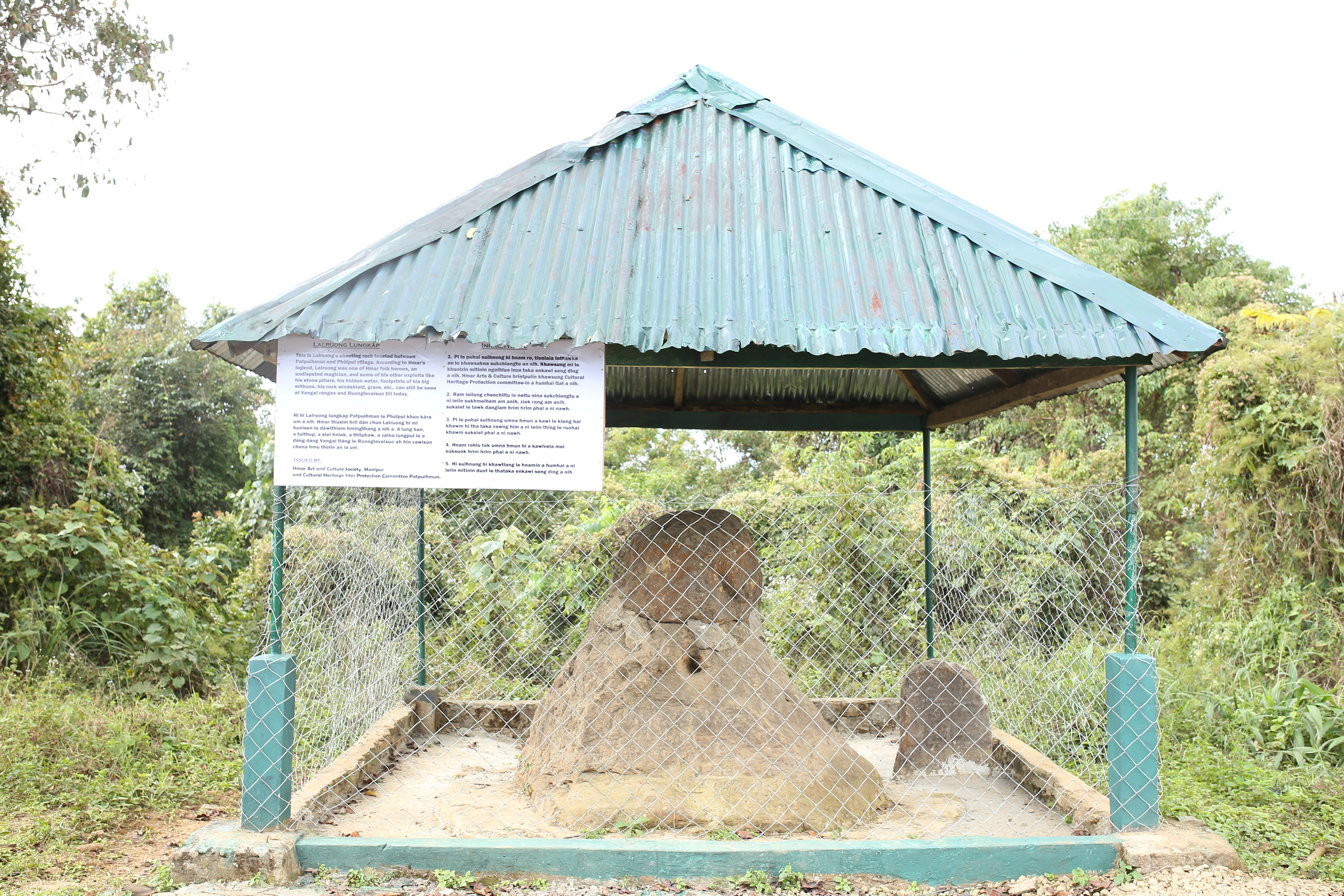

- Location in Manipur, India Lalruong Lungkap (India)
- Coordinates: 24.35994°N 93.07229°E
- Country: India
- State: Manipur
- District: Pherzawl District

Lalruong Lungkap (translated as 'Lalruong's Rock Shot') is situated between Patpuihmun and Phulpui. According to Hmar legend, Lalruong is regarded as one of the folk heroes of the Hmar people, revered for his magical abilities. Various remnants of his exploits, such as stone pillars, 'hidden' water sources, and imprints of large mithuns, are said to still exist in the Vangai ranges and Ruonglevaisuo region. Lalruong, born to Zauhrang and Zawtleipui, is said to have exhibited 'remarkable' intelligence from a young age, 'mastering' the art of magic taught by Vanhrit, an indigenous deity worshipped by the Hmar people before the advent of Christianity. His reputation as a skilled magician extended far beyond his homeland, and he was known for carrying a magic tube that aided him in navigating challenging situations. Traditionally associated with the areas surrounding Ruonglevaisuo (Tipaimukh) and the Vangâi ranges, Lalruong's influence is evident in the local nomenclature, such as the Barak river being referred to as Tuiruong, meaning Lalruong's river.

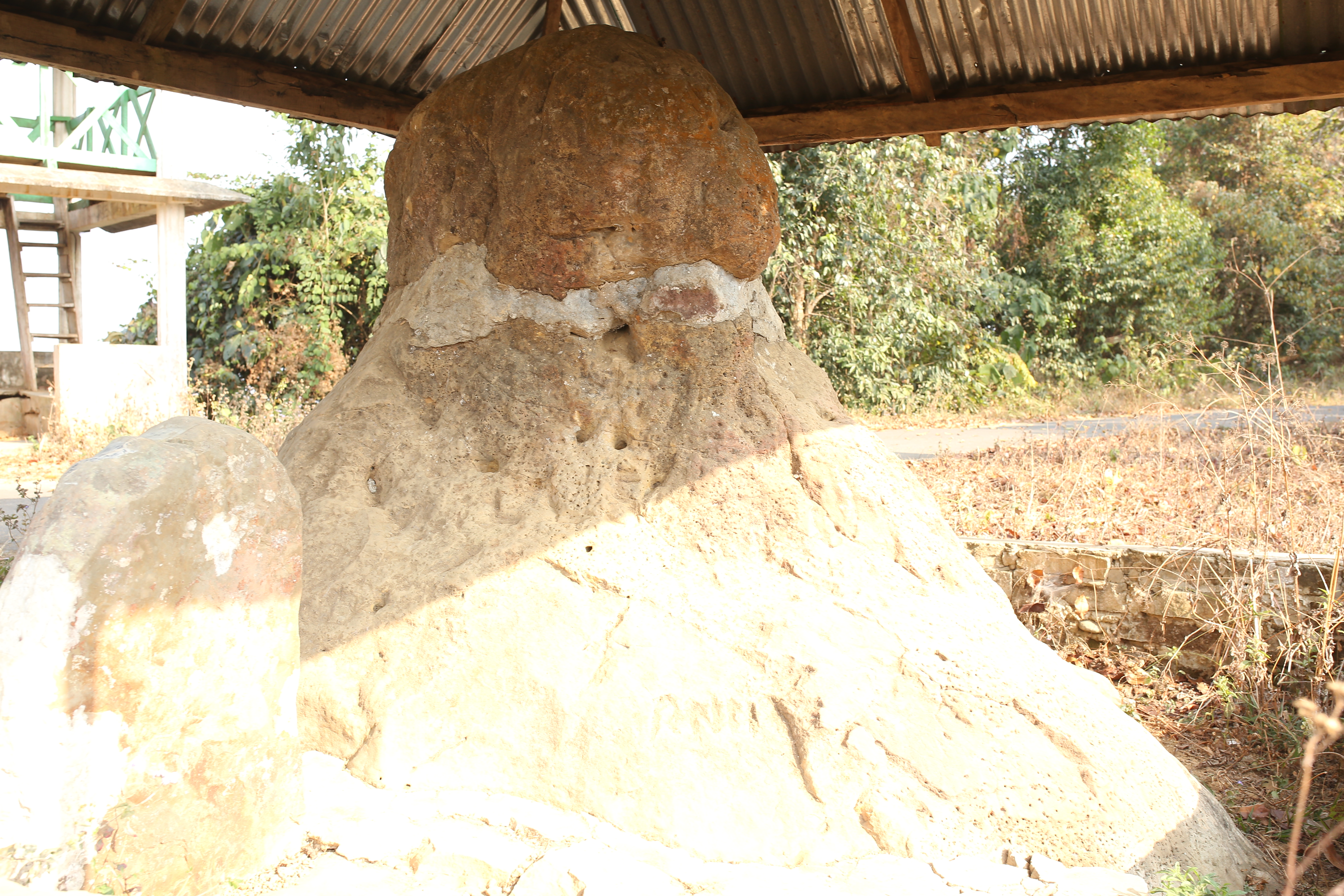
Close up view

Numerous sites linked to Lalruong's feats, including his hidden spring and the location where he dispersed fog using magic, are still identifiable near Ngampabung village and Ruonglevaisuo. One particularly noteworthy location is the spot along the Barak riverbank where Lalruong engaged in a magical showdown with Dawikungpu, showcasing his prowess. Among Lalruong's 'memorable' exploits is the rock shot located between Patpuihmun and Phulpui village, serving as a legacy of this legendary figure. While Hmar and related tribes like Bâwms and Ranglongs regard Lalruong as a historical figure, his precise existence remains a subject of belief and speculation.

== Parbung Pasalṭha Lungdaw ==
Parbung Pasalṭha Lungdaw
- Ethno-Cultural Site
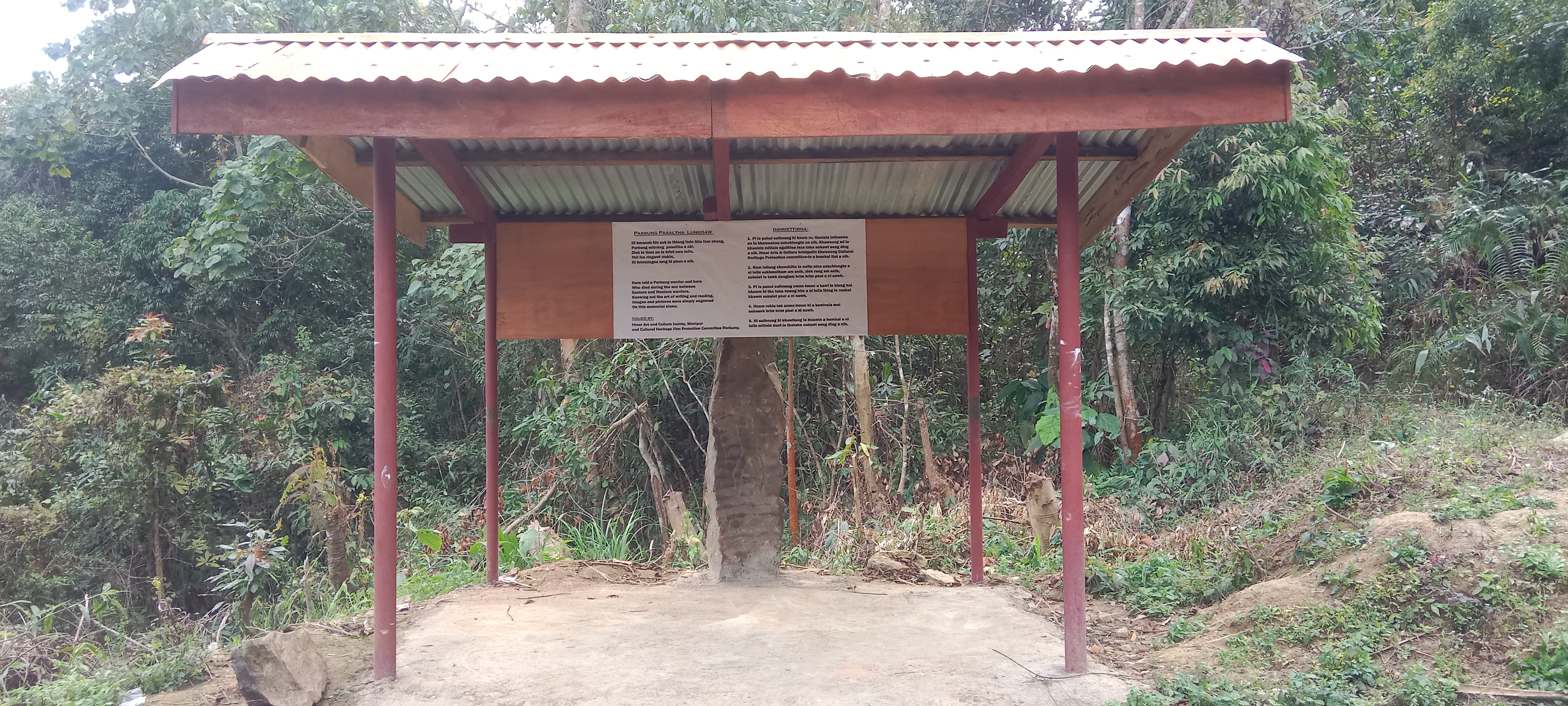

- Location in Manipur, India Parbung Pasalṭha Lungdaw (India)
- Coordinates: 24.26471°N 93.11414°E
- Country: India
- State: Manipur
- District: Pherzawl District

It is narrated in the following way:

Hi hmunah hin sak le thlang indo lâia fam chang,

Parbung mihrâng pasalṭha a zâl. Ziek le tiem an la hriet naw leiin, Thil lim ringawt ziekin,

Hi hrietzingna lung hi phun a nih.

In Hmar language:

Here laid a Parbung warrior and hero

Who died during the war between Eastern and Western warriors. Knowing not the art of writing and reading, Images and pictures were simply engraved

On this memorial stone.

Prior to the establishment of the present-day Parbung in 1865, several clans of Hmars, such as Pakhuongte, Sanate, Inbuon, Riengsete, and Mihriemate, had settled in the upper region of Râllâwn, while a smaller faction of Thado tribes led by the Singson clan occupied the lower part of Râllâwn. Due to recurrent conflicts and misunderstandings, particularly regarding land ownership and boundaries, the area earned the name Râllâwn, meaning the "fighting place of warring warriors." This designation coincided with the Hmar-Lushai war that spanned from 1876 to 1880. Notably, Pastor Kappu, a 'renowned' Hmar hymn composer, hailed from the Râllâwn hamlet. Among the prominent Hmar warriors of that era were individuals like Thlova Sanate, the grandfather of the late Hrangsing, a montri, and father of the late Ngurdinglien Sanate, Buona Inbuon, Vungdang Riengsete, and Hanga Mihriemate. These figures played significant roles during the Hmar-Lusei conflict. Notably, Vungdang Riengsete undertook a mission to Saitual village in Mizoram to pursue and exact revenge on Saizahawl, another renowned Hmar warrior under the Pawibawi chief of Mizoram, who had slain Hmanga, the younger brother of Vungdang Riengsete. While the specific identity of the warrior commemorated by the memorial stone remains uncertain, the engraved figures and images on the stone unmistakably depict an exceptionally brave and heroic individual.

== Lungleng Lung ==
Lungleng Lung
- Ethno-Cultural Site
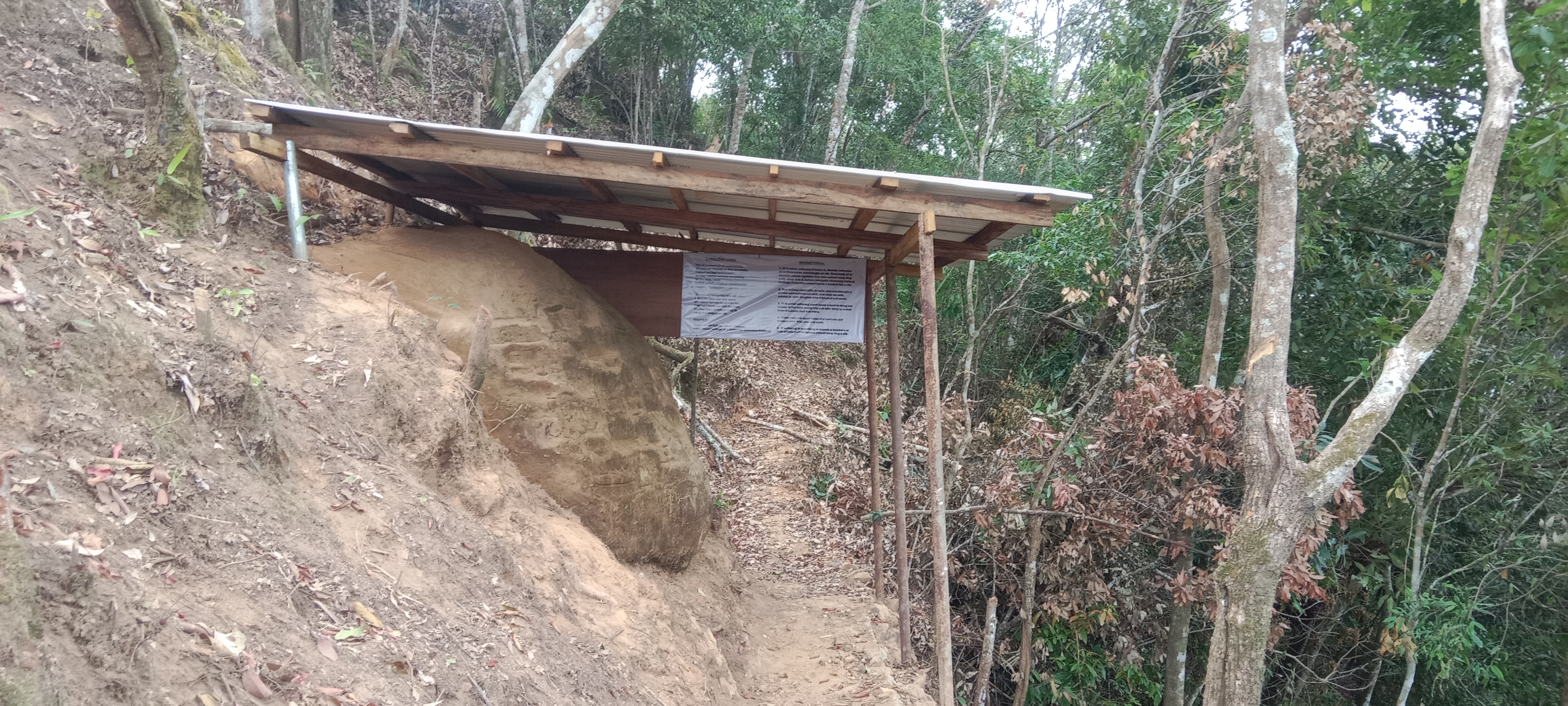

- Location in Manipur, India Lungleng Lung (India)
- Coordinates: 24.23992°N 93.11016°E
- Country: India
- State: Manipur
- District: Pherzawl District

A Rock of melancholy:

This is a mountain of melancholia,

Whosoever climbed on this mountain, Cannot but feel melancholic, So they used to scribble something On the rock below.

So it is called a Rock of Melancholia.

Lunglêng Lungpui:

Hi lunglêng tlânga hin mi a kâi chun,

A lung â'n lêng naw thei nawh. Chuleiin a thlanga lungpuiah hin, Ieng ieng amani an ziek ṭiel hlak, Chuong chu a ni leiin hi lung hi,

Lunglêng lungpui an tih.

Several kilometers south of Parbung, there is a steep mountain commonly referred to as Lunglêng tlâng, or "a mountain of melancholia." Positioned atop this mountain, one can behold the Kailâm cliffs to the east and the plains of Silchar adorned with wet rice cultivation. The sobriquet "mountain of melancholia" stems from the profound sense of nostalgia and melancholy often evoked when standing at such high altitudes. Nestled beneath this mountain lies a sizable rock adorned with various inscriptions and images, many of which date back to the pre-Christian era when writing was not yet prevalent. Following the advent of literacy, individuals, particularly lovers, began etching abbreviated names onto this rock during their visits to the mountain. Consequently, this rock has earned the apt moniker "A Rock of Melancholia."

== Lungsum ==
Lungsum
- Ethno-Cultural Site
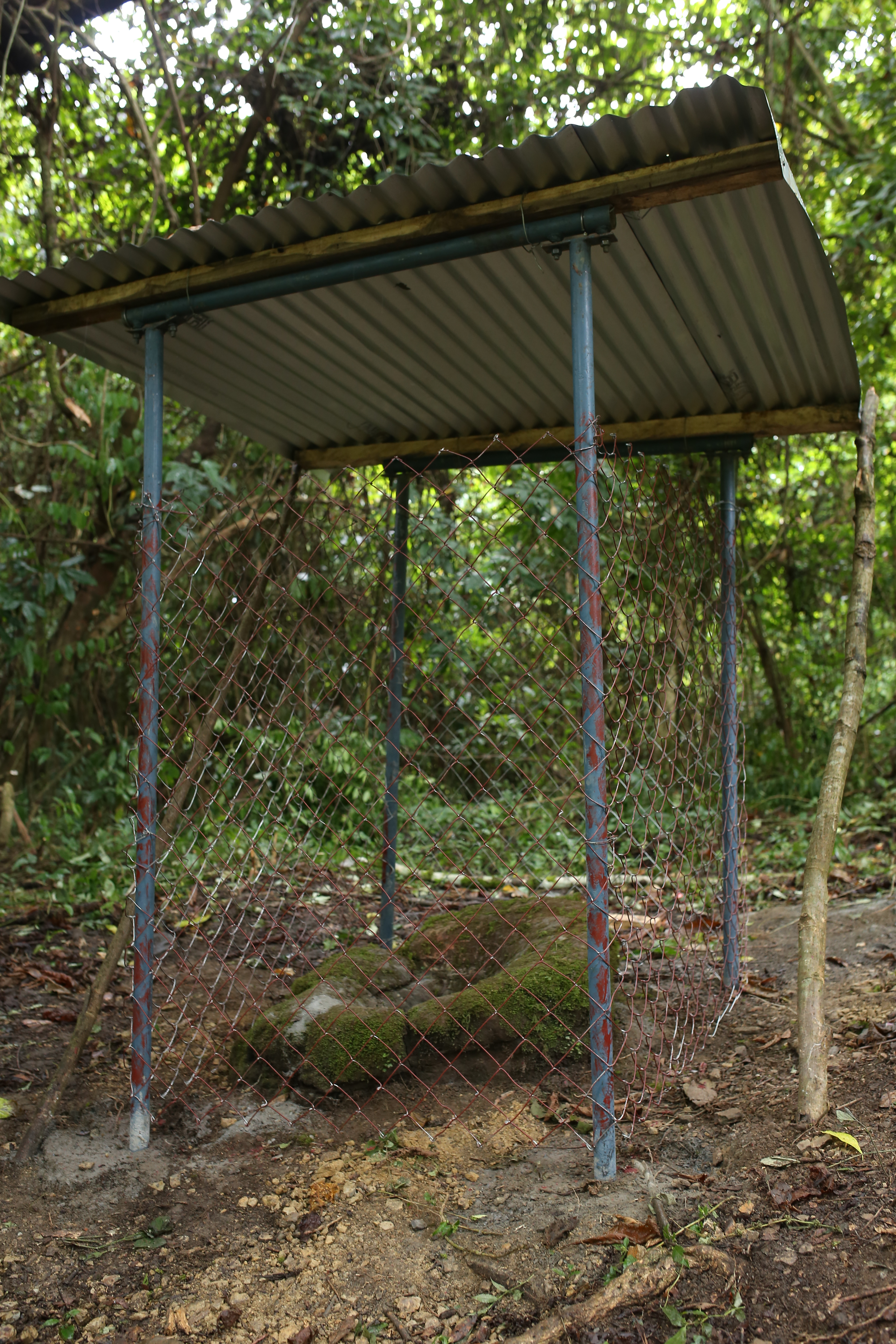

- Location in Manipur, India Lungsum (India)
- Coordinates: 24.13845°N 93.04036°E
- Country: India
- State: Manipur
- District: Pherzawl District

This Lungsum (stone-mortar), located in the old Zopui village, was carved from solid rock and traditionally used for husking rice during the Sikpui Festival. Typically, Hmar families couldn't afford such a mortar, leading to the belief that this particular one was crafted specifically for the festival. In ancient times, when the Hmar ancestors began agricultural practices, they commonly used wooden mortars. It's believed that the people of Zopui village created a cavity in a solid flat rock for husking rice during the Sikpui Festival in 1897. This was a labor-intensive process, requiring iron tools and considerable effort to carve into solid rock. It's possible that this type of stone mortar was used for communal purposes like inchawng and Sikpui feasts. During such events, young men and women would come together to perform tasks collectively, including rice husking, as a significant quantity of rice was needed for brewing zu, a traditional alcoholic beverage. Historically, every Hmar family had its own wooden mortar, which they carried with them during their migrations.

== Chawnlut Lungphun ==
Chawnlût Lungphun
- Ethno-Cultural Site
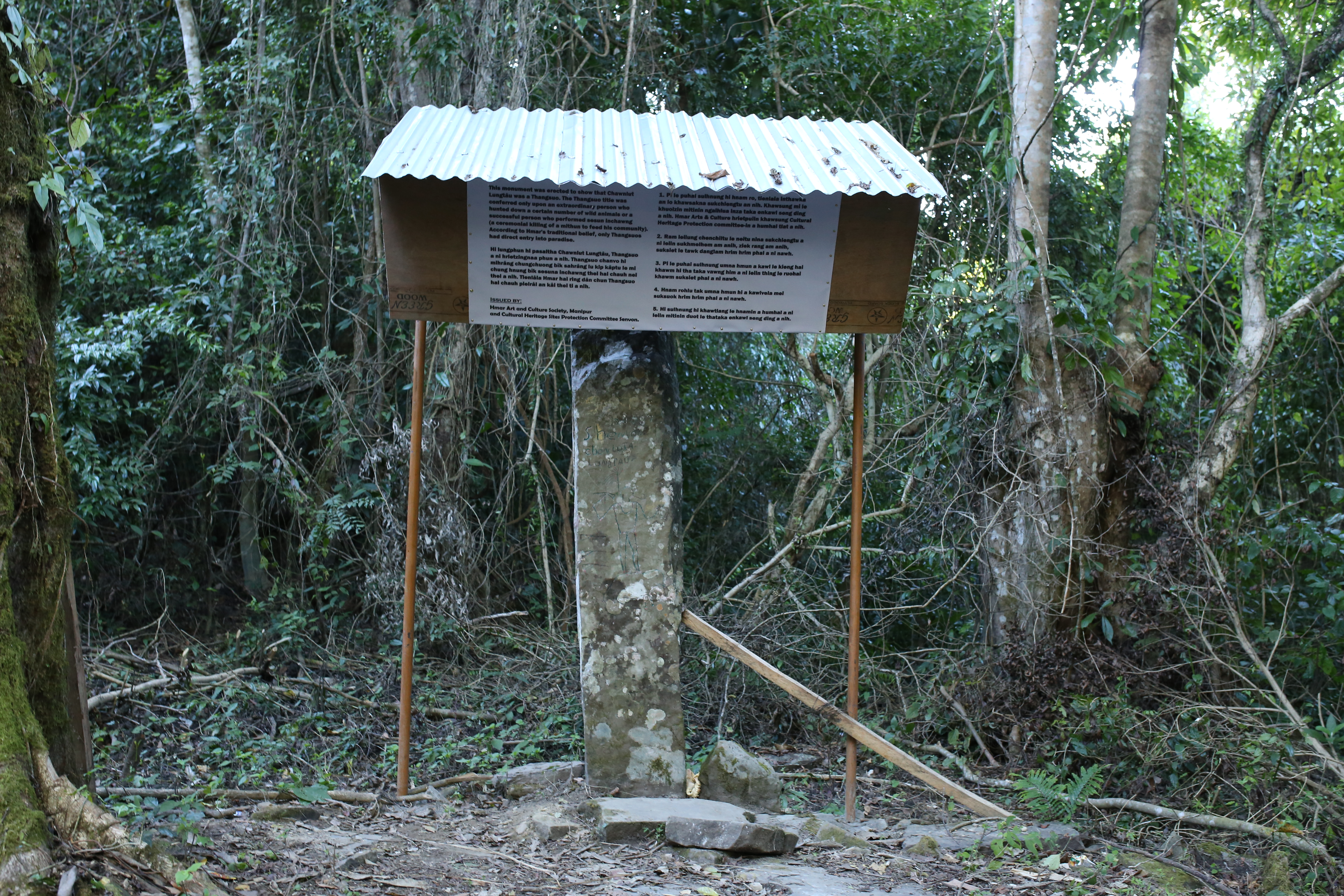

- Location in Manipur, India Chawnlût Lungphun (India)
- Coordinates: 24.13800°N 93.03846°E
- Country: India
- State: Manipur
- District: Pherzawl District

This monument was erected to commemorate the achievements of Chawnlût Lungṭâu, who was recognized as a Thangsuo. The 'Thangsuo' title was bestowed upon individuals who demonstrated 'exceptional' hunting skills or performed ceremonial rituals to benefit their community. According to Hmar tradition, Thangsuo were believed to have direct entry into 'paradise.' Chawnlût Lungṭâu, son of Thangzangûr from Zopui village, was known as a skilled hunter and warrior, earning the 'prestigious' title by hunting a 'significant' number of wild animals and hosting public feasts. Possessing this title was considered 'a pathway to paradise' in Hmar pre-Christian beliefs. Chawnlût had multiple wives and children, including slaves. The memorial stone was erected to honor Chawnlût's accomplishments as a Thangsuo. It stood at a height of approximately 107 inches, with dimensions of 17 inches thickness and 9 and a half inches breadth. The stone served as a testament to Chawnlût's wealth, displaying his possessions such as four guns, one large gong, and three small gongs. Images on the monument depicted Chawnlût's hunting exploits, including the killing of three elephants and two wild mithuns. One of the mithun's horns remains preserved at the home of his great-great-grandson in Muolvaiphei, Tuiṭhaphâi. Additionally, Chawnlût was credited with taking six enemy heads and capturing a young girl who later became a member of his family. Due to the illiteracy of the Hmars in Zopui village at the time, Chawnlût's name was engraved on the monument by a hired individual from Mizoram, who received a small gong as payment for his services.

== Sikpui Lung ==
Sikpui Lung (Râlvêngbûk)
- Ethno-Cultural Site
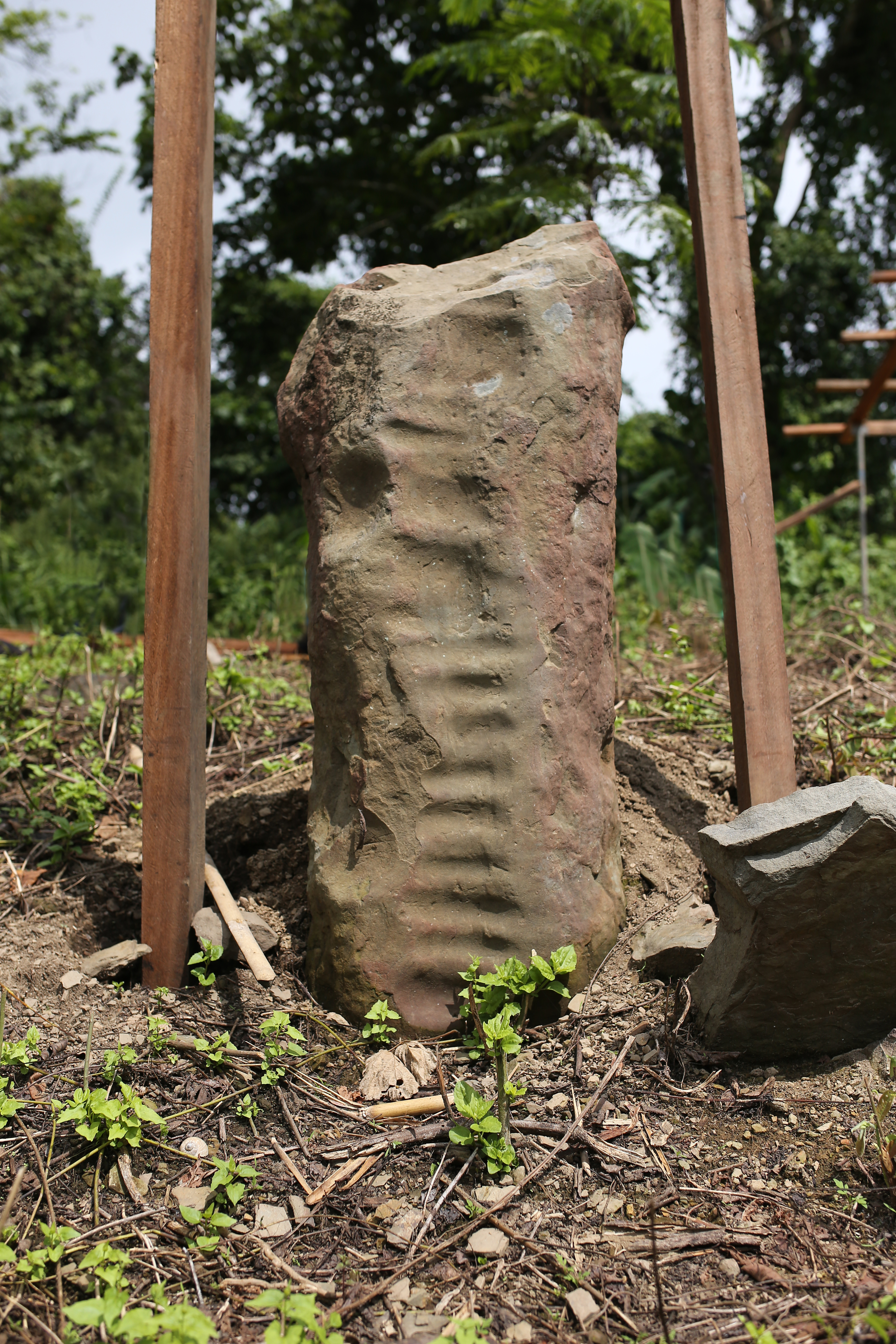

- Location in Manipur, India Sikpui Lung (Râlvêngbûk) (India)
- Coordinates: 24.39048°N 93.08995°E
- Country: India
- State: Manipur
- District: Pherzawl District

This Sikpui Lung at Râlvêngbûk near Phulpui, Pherzawl district was erected for the 'drummer' and the 'chanter' of Sikpui song to sit when Sikpui Festival was celebrated by the Râlvêngbûk villagers during Chief Thlurolien Amo's reign in 1904. The mountain where the Sikpui Lung was constructed is situated approximately one kilometer from the present-day Phulpui, within Pherzawl district. Referred to as 'Khawrâwtlâng,' it formerly housed around 20 households. Archeological findings of broken pottery and trivets, crafted from solid rocks, substantiate the historical presence of Hmar ancestors in this locality from 1850 to 1860. The region's significance stems from its strategic positioning, serving as a defensive stronghold during periods of intra- and inter-tribal conflicts. Consequently, it earned the designation 'Râlvêngbûk,' translating to "guard tower" in the local Hmar vernacular.

=== Kûtpui Lungphun ===
The Kutpui Lungphun or literally translated as Kûtpui Stone Post, erected in 1904 alongside the Sikpuilung nearby, holds significance in Râlvêngbûk village, particularly during festivals like Zâwlkêu, Khuonglâwm, and Lâwmpui. These festivals were marked by the tradition of erecting stone posts to commemorate the feasts held at specific locations, making Râlvêngbûk distinctive in this practice. The Sikpufeast, unique to the Hmars in Northeast India, is celebrated in December during years of abundant harvest, known as fapâng râlinsân years. Preparations for the feast involve collecting, winnowing, and husking the previous year's yield to brew rice beer, locally known as zu. During the Sikpui Feast, families bring their share of zu to partake in communal feasting. This communal sharing, termed 'Sikpui,' likely contributes to the festival's name. Additionally, some suggest that the festival's timing during the winter months led to its name. The Sikpui Feast is distinguished not only by its communal aspect but also by the songs and dances that accompany it. Nine distinct Sikpui dances, accompanied by songs collectively known as Sikpui Hla, are performed during the festival. Of these, Sikpui Hlapui (Hla Ser) holds particular reverence, as the Sikpui dance traditionally begins with its rendition.

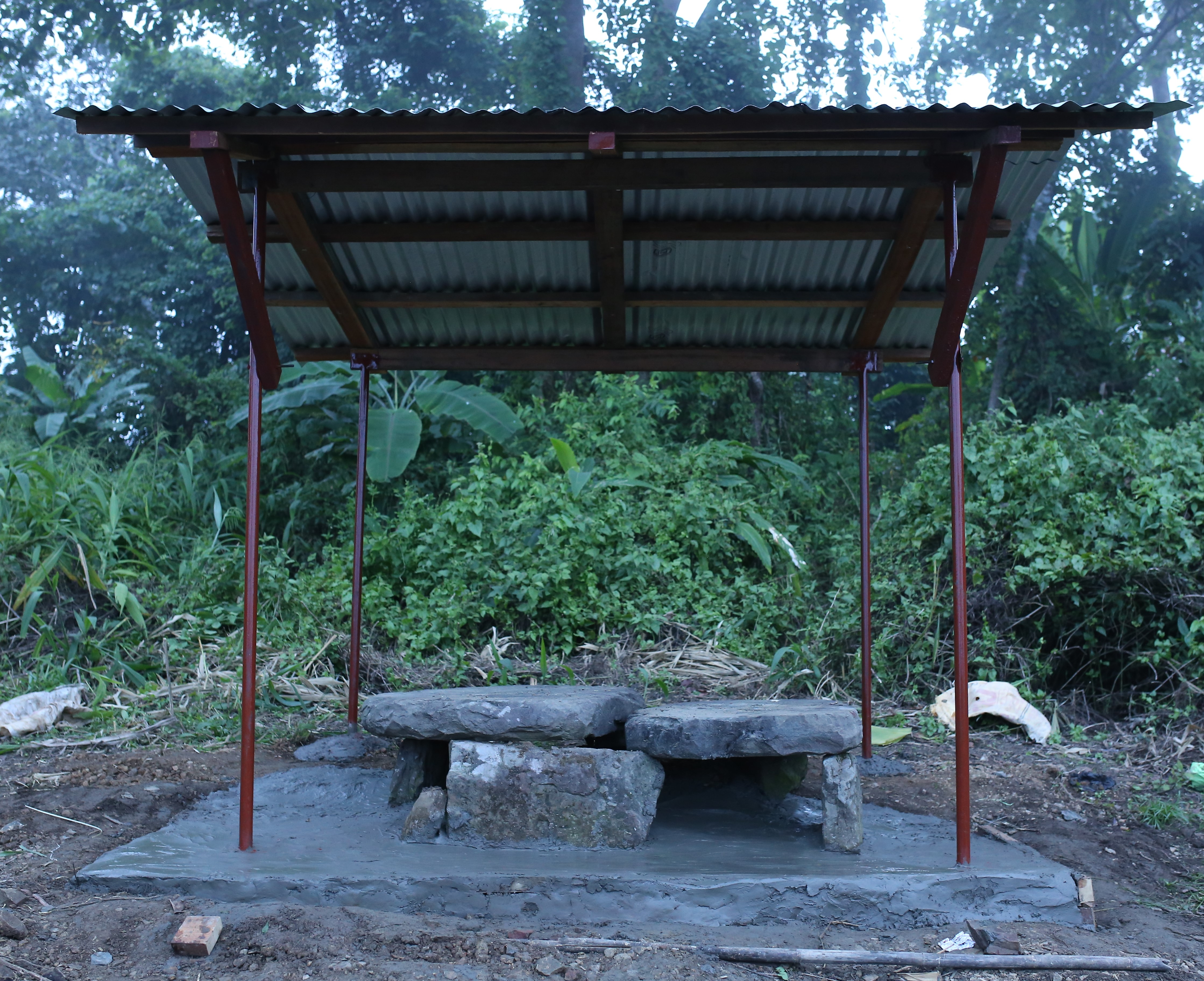
Kûtpui Lungphun

The Sikpui Feast includes various traditional songs and dances, which contribute to its cultural heritage. Nine distinct Sikpui dances are performed, each accompanied by specific songs collectively known as Sikpui Hla. These dances include Buontlaw Hla, Hranthli Hla, Lamtluong Hla, Saia Ketet lam Hla, Simsak Hla, Tangkâwngvâilâk Hla, Inran Hla, Ṭînna Hla, and Hla Vuina (Hla Phumna). Among these, Sikpui Hlapui (Hla Ser) holds particular significance, often marking the initiation of the Sikpui dance.

== Zawllung ==
Zawllung
- Ethno-Cultural Site
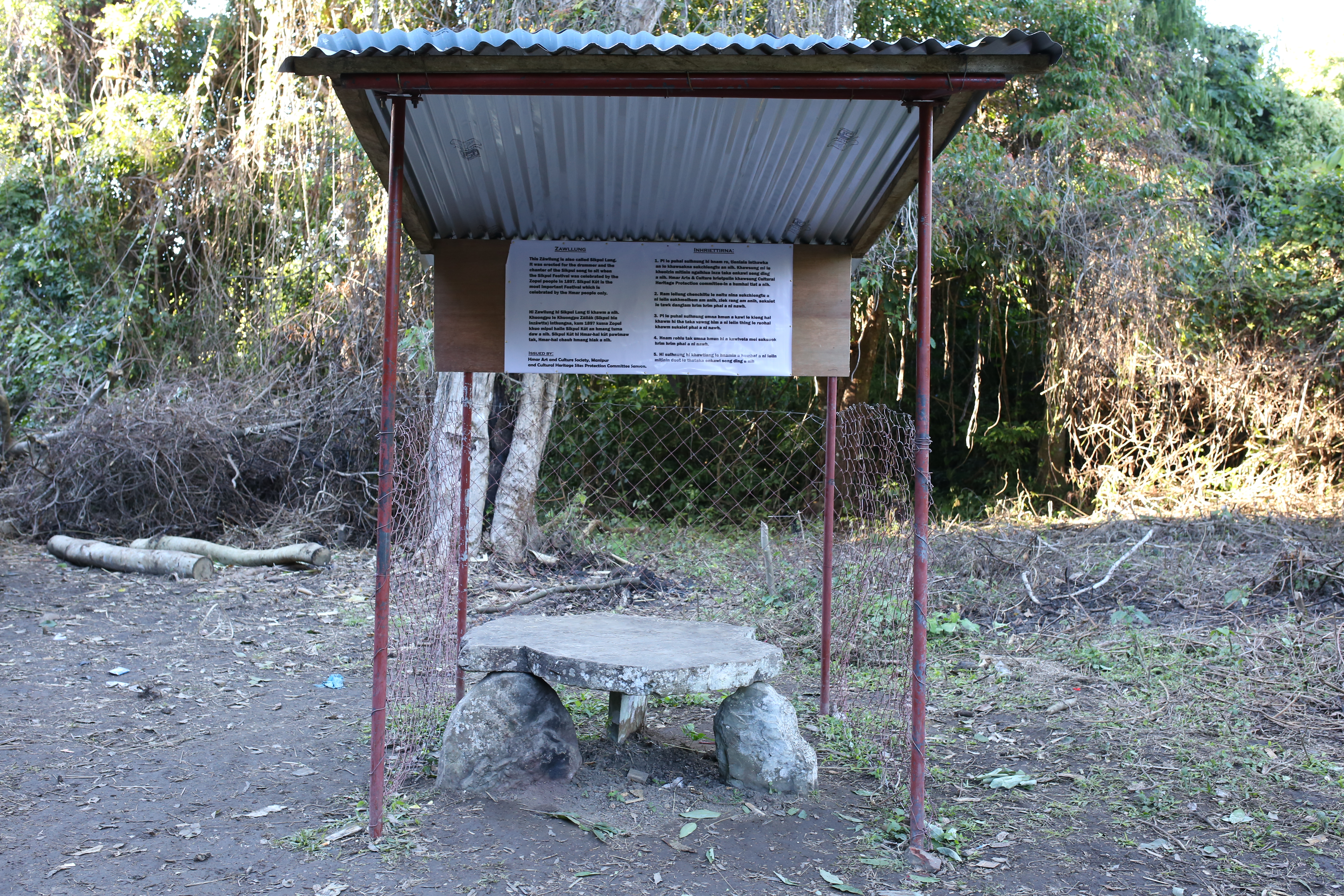

- Location in Manipur, India Zawllung (India)
- Coordinates: 24.13826°N 93.04043°E
- Country: India
- State: Manipur
- District: Pherzawl District

The Zâwllung, also known as Sikpui Lung, was constructed to accommodate the drummer and chanter during the Sikpui Festival, observed by the Zopui people in 1897. The festival, primarily celebrated by the Hmars, hold significant cultural importance. Situated in the former Zopui village, nestled within the Zopui range, approximately one kilometer above the southern side of present-day Senvawn village, this structure served as a focal point for communal festivities. Founded by Chief Tuola Pulamte, the Zopui village comprised around 60 households. Oral tradition suggests that the Zâwllung (Sikpuilung) was established in 1897, with Ngurpuilal Inbuon (Bawnga pa) serving as Khuongpu Zâilâk during the Sikpui celebrations. Over time, the Zopui village amalgamated with neighboring settlements such as Hmunte, Lohawi, Pamṭhul, and Sâtṭhiek, forming a unified village known as Kâwnzâr, now identified as Senvawn. This geographical location held strategic importance for British military operations.

In 1870, during the British campaign to pacify Mizo chiefs, Senvawn served as a crucial base for the northern column, led by Woodthorpe. Additionally, Senvawn was considered by the missionary William Pettigrew as a potential site for a Christian mission station in the late 19th century. However, due to opposition from local authorities and ongoing tribal conflicts, Pettigrew's plans did not materialize. In 1910, under the leadership of the village's chief, Welsh missionary Watkin Roberts arrived in Senvawn to spread the teachings of Christianity. This event marked a significant milestone in the village's history, earning it the reputation as the "seedbed of the Gospel" among the Hmar people. The influence of Roberts' mission extended beyond Senvawn, reaching neighboring regions such as South-west Manipur, the Khuga valley, and even areas beyond national borders, such as Tamu in Myanmar and the Chittagong Hill Tracts in Bangladesh.

== Bibliography ==
=== Vernacular Sources ===
- Darneilal Kholum, Senvawn Chanchin, 1896–2006, Churachandpur, 2010.
- Chawngsangvung Pangote, Senvawn Chanchin.
- Darthangluoi Faihriem, Sikpui Ruoi (Winter Festival the Hmars), Diphu, 2002.
- Hranglien Songate, Hmar Chanchin. 1977.
- Hmar Ṭobul Nun
- Pulamte, John H. (2011). Hmar Bungpui Pastor Thangngur.
- Phulpui Gospel Centenary, 2020.
- Thangsawihmang's (unpublished MSS); Some places of Historical importance in Pherzawl District, Pherzawl.
- H. V. Vara, Hmar Hla Hlui (The Hmar Folk Dinga, Lyrics and Chants), Churachandpur, 1967.
- Lallungawi & V. K. Pangamte, Edited, Hnam Ro-2, Hmar Writers' Club, Churachandpur, 2023.
- L.Keivom & David Buhril, Biethu: Selected Writings of Keivom & Buhril, Sinlung Academy of Letters, 2020.
- Lienzathang, Parbung Chanchin.
- Pastor Chawilien, Lalkhawlien Pulamte & L. Kiemlo Pulamte, Leiri-Changsan Pahnam Chanchin, Churachandpur, 2020.

=== Ethnographical Interviews ===
- Field reports of RWUS Staff members.
- Lienzuol Shunate's oral information.
- Oral Sources Collected through some selected Village Authority members of Lungthulien, Parbung & Senvawn.
- Personal Interview with Thangsawihmang Sawngte (87), Muolhlum, Rengkai.
- Personal Interview with Kama (93), Bethel, Churachandpur.
