= Senvawn =

Birthplace of Christianity in Southern Manipur, India

Senvawn Kawnzâr Senvon
- Village
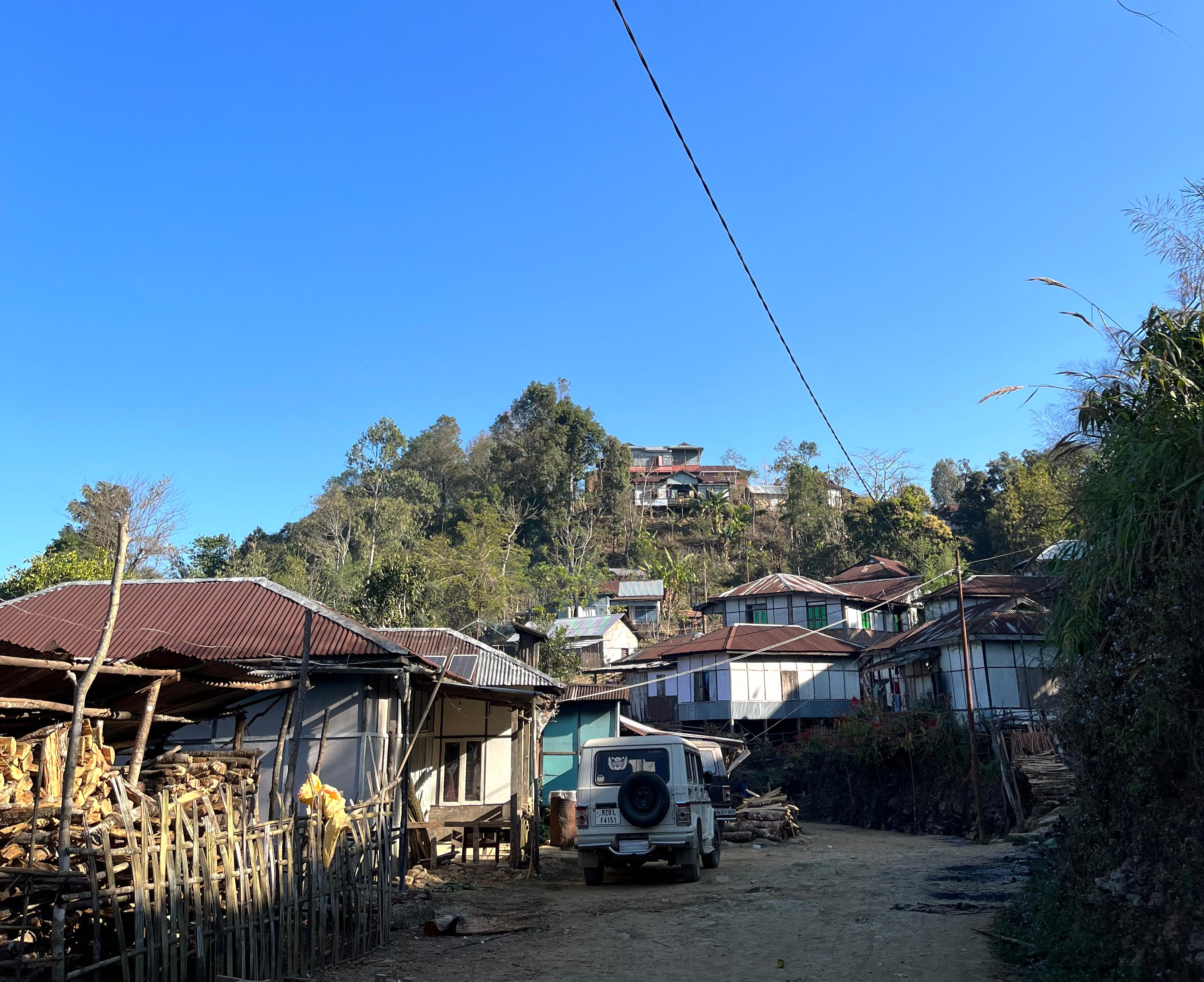
- Senvawn street view

- Location in Manipur, India Senvawn (India)
- Coordinates: 24.14222°N 93.04808°E
- Country: India
- State: Manipur
- District: Pherzawl District..

Population (2011)
  - Total: 3,136

Languages
  - Official: Hmar
- Time zone: UTC+5:30 (IST)
- Vehicle registration: MN

Senvawn or Senvon is a Hmar village in Pherzawl district, Northeast India and is attributed to be the 'birthplace' of Christianity in Southern Manipur. The initial Christian converts among the Hmar and other sister tribes was made by a Welsh missionary Watkin Roberts in 1910. Senvon is also the 8th District Council Constituency (DCC) in the Churachandpur Autonomous District Council. According to the 2011 census, Senvawn holds 498 households

== Geography ==
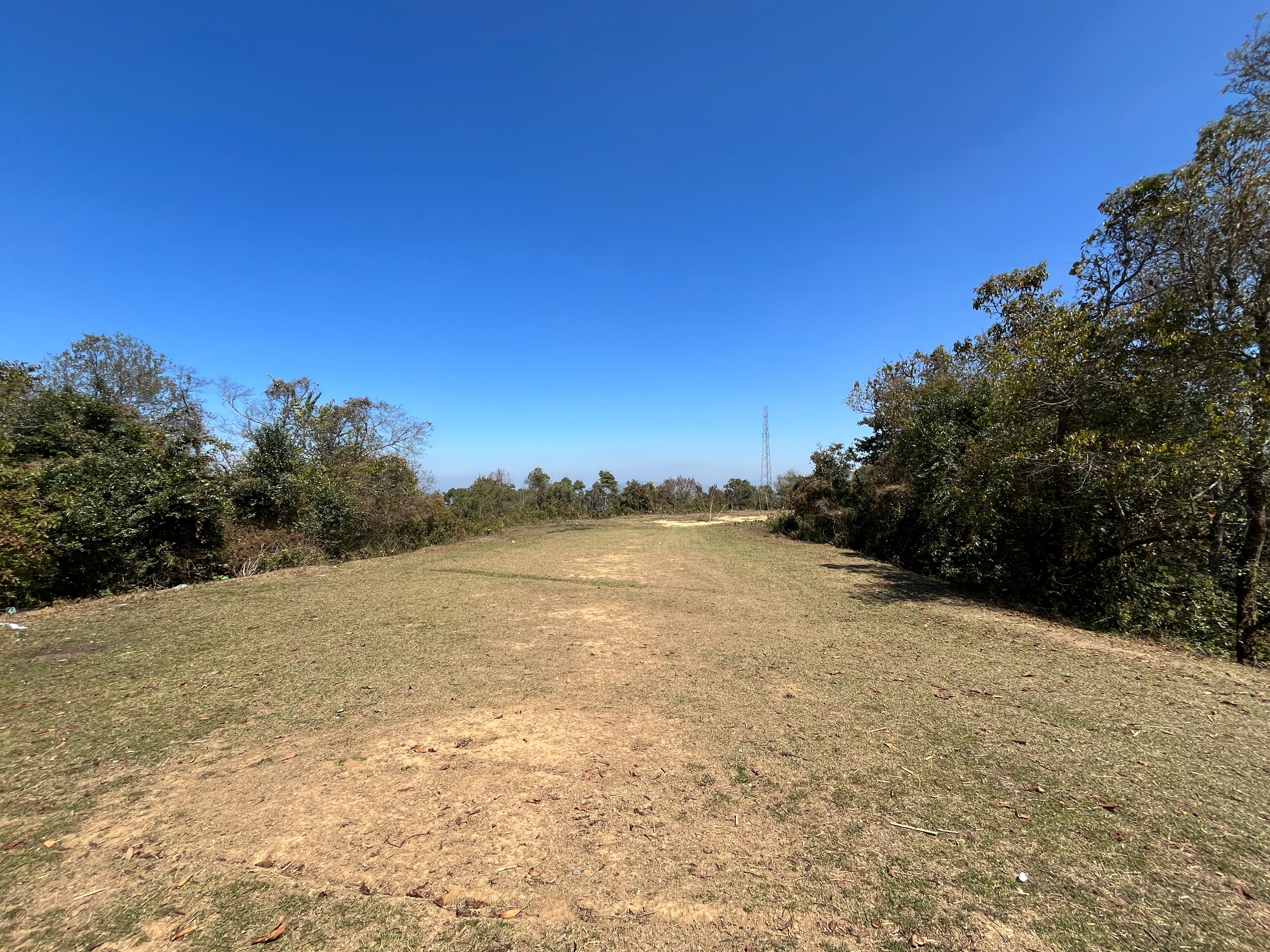
Senvawn Hill (Senvawn Tlang)

Senvawn is situated on the Senvon Range, which runs north-south, parallel to the Vangaitang range. The eastern bend of the Barak River flows between Vangaitang and Senvon ranges. Senvawn is at the southern end of the range, to the south of which the Tuivai River flows from east to west. South of the river are the longitudinal ranges of Mizoram. The one directly to the south of Senvon range is called Vanbong range.

To the east of Senvon, a small river called Tuibum flows south and joins the Tuivai River. Further east is a hill called Parvachawm (or Parbachang), famed as the village of Lushai chief Vonpilal.

Other locations close to Senvawn are Tipaimukh to the northewest, Parbung to the north, Phullen towards the South, Thanlon towards the East, and Thingdawl towards the West.

Senvon is located 22 kms from Tipaimukh, 82 kms from its erstwhile district's capital Churachandpur, and 132 kms from the state's capital Imphal. Parbung, Lungthulien, and Leisen are its nearby villages.

== History ==
Senvawn is said to have been established by Pahum Pulamte, Seilutpa Puruolte and Lalchawn Pudaite.

== Churches ==
Senvawn, being a Christianized village, holds several churches. These churches are dominantly run by Hmar-based denominations.

== See also ==
- Hmar Ethnic Cultural Sites
- Pherzawl district

== Bibliography ==
- Churachandpur District Census Handbook (PDF), Directorate of Census Operations, Manipur, 2011
- Singh, Karam Manimohan (1991), History of the Christian Missions in Manipur and Neighbouring States, Mittal Publications, ISBN 81-7099-285-0 – via archive.org
