= Damdiei =

Village in Pherzawl, Manipur, India

- Village
- Location in Manipur, India Damdiei (India)
- Coordinates: 24.32026°N 93.17532°E
- Country: India
- State: Manipur
- District: Pherzawl District.
- Established: 1976

Population (2011)
  - Total: 682

Languages
  - Official: Hmar
- Time zone: UTC+5:30 (IST)
- Vehicle registration: MN

Damdiei or "Damdei" is a Hmar village under Tipaimukh Sub-Division in Pherzawl District, India. The National Highway 150 (India, old numbering) runs through this village, hence providing an economic linkage between Mizoram and Manipur. The village lies approximately 10 kilometres from Pherzawl, the district headquarters. The village was established in 1976 and currently holds around 140 houses.

== Economy ==
Damdiei is known for its abundant banana cultivation, contributing to both its local economy and diet. It is distinguished among the villages in Pherzawl District for having an abundant water supply.

== Climate ==
The climate is relatively cold, aligning with the general climatic conditions of the Pherzawl District, which experiences a humid subtropical climate. The district's temperature ranges from a minimum of 3.4 °C to a maximum of 34.1 °C, with annual rainfall varying between 670 and 1,450 mm.

== Local Sites ==
=== Damdiei Lake ===
Locally known as "Neikhup Dil", it is an artificial lake believed to have been built by one Mr. Neikhup back in the 1970s.

=== ICI Lake ===
Locally known as "ICI Dil," the lake is owned by the Independent Church of India (ICI), Hmarbiel Presbytery, India, and is where the lake takes its name.
