= Sartuinek =

Village in Pherzawl District, Manipur, India

- Village
- Location in Manipur, India Sartuinek (India)
- Coordinates: 24.29853°N 93.04200°E
- Country: India
- State: Manipur
- District: Pherzawl District
- Established: 1903
- Founder: Dolienpui

Population (2011)
  - Total: 707

Languages
  - Official: Hmar
- Time zone: UTC+5:30 (IST)
- Vehicle registration: MN

Sartuinek is a Hmar village in Pherzawl district, Manipur, India. Hringtuinek, a Hmar ethnic cultural site is from this village. The village was established in 1903 and celebrated its centennial in 2003.

== History ==
Sartuinek was founded by Mr. Dolienpui in 1903. The name 'Sartuinek' comes from a rivulet of the same name, which is said to be formed by a spring. In Hmar mythology, this specific rivulet is where people who die unnatural deaths (called sarthi) drink as they pass through the 'land of the dead' (called mithi khuo).

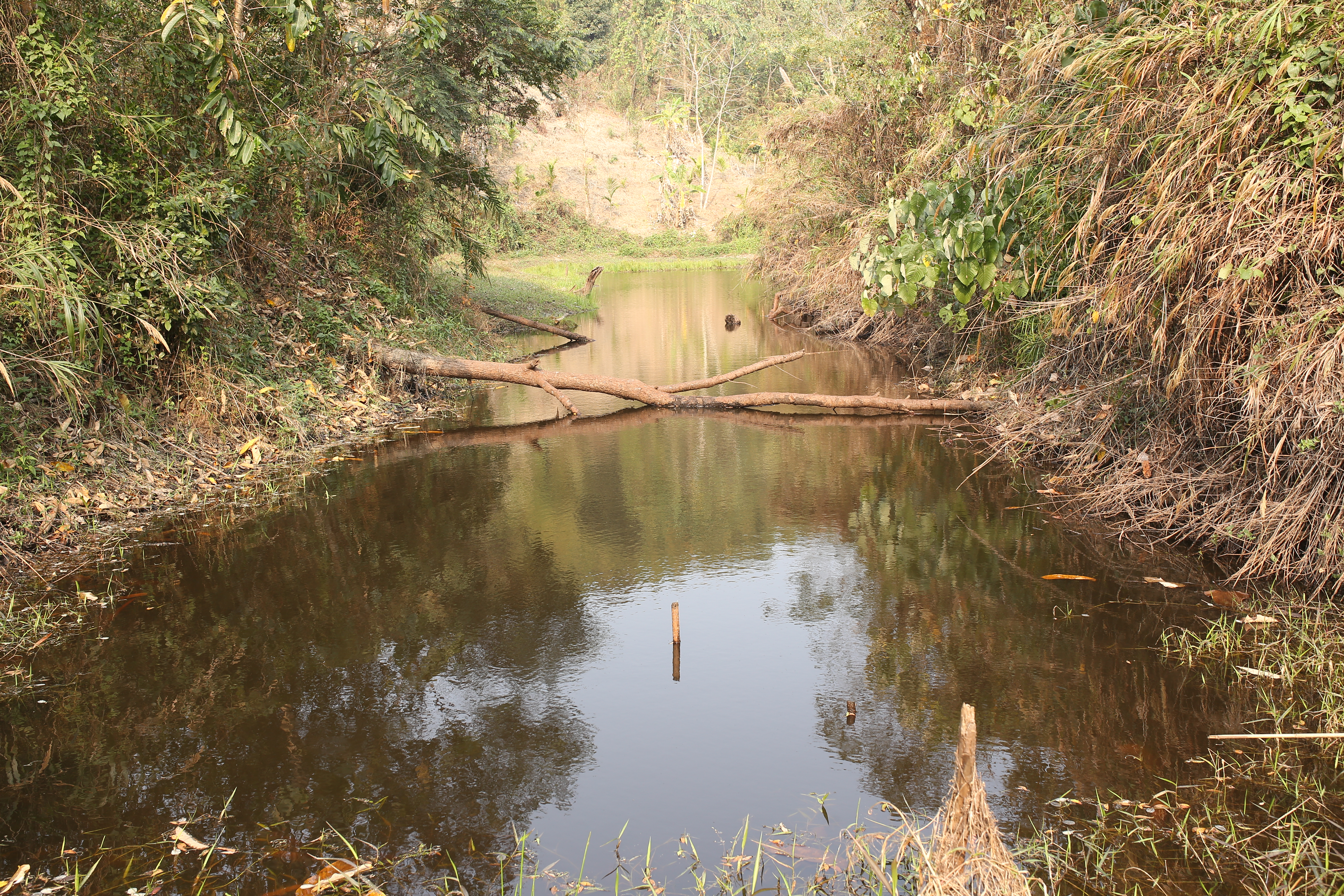
Sartuinek (rivulet)
