= Chaltonlien Amo =

Indian politician

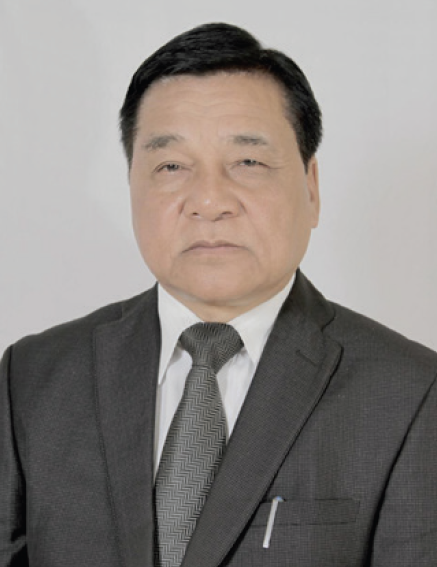

Member of Legislative Assembly in the 11th Manipur Assembly, 10th Manipur Assembly, 8th Manipur Assembly, 6th Manipur Assembly
- In office 1995-2000, 2002-2007, 2012-2017, 2017-2022
- Succeeded by: Ngursanglur Sanate
- Constituency: Tipaimukh

Personal details
- Born: 1 March 1955 (age 71) Patpuihmun, Pherzawl District, Manipur
- Party: Bharatiya Janata Party
- Spouse: Lalramsang Amo
- Children: Emmanuel Lalropui Amo, Florence Lallungawi, Dr. Job Lalhrietzing Amo
- Parents: (L). D. R. Thuoma (father); (L) Rodailovi (mother)
- Education: RIMS

Chaltonlien Amo is an Indian politician. He was a member of the Manipur Legislative Assembly from Tipaimukh Assembly constituency and hails from the Bharatiya Janata Party. He had won four times as an MLA from the same constituency. Chaltonlien is from the Hmar tribe.

== Political career ==
Manipur Legislative Assembly (1995–Present)
Sl. No	Term	Status	Party	Constituency	Opponent(s)
1	1995-2000	Won	Indian National Congress	Tipaimukh	
1	2000-2002	Lost	Indian National Congress	Tipaimukh	Ngursanglur Sanate
2	2002-2007	Won	Indian National Congress	Tipaimukh	Ngursanglur Sanate
3	2007-2012	Lost	Indian National Congress	Tipaimukh	Ngursanglur Sanate
4	2012-2017	Won	Indian National Congress	Tipaimukh	Ngursanglur Sanate, Dr. Lallukhum Fimate
5	2017-2022	Won	Indian National Congress	Tipaimukh	Ngursanglur Sanate, Dr. Lallukhum Fimate
6	2022-2027	Lost	Bharatiya Janata Party	Tipaimukh	Ngursanglur Sanate, Thangthatling

== Books ==
- Ka Khuolzinna Lamtluong (2025)
