= Phulpui =

Village in Pherzawl District, Manipur, India

- Village
- Location in Manipur, India Phulpui (India)
- Coordinates: 24.38436°N 93.08493°E
- Country: India
- State: Manipur
- District: Pherzawl District

Population (2011)
  - Total: 750

Languages
  - Official: Hmar
- Time zone: UTC+5:30 (IST)
- Vehicle registration: MN

Phulpui is a Hmar village in Pherzawl district, Manipur, India. The village stands near the Barak river. A government record puts them at 72 households and has over 390 active voters. Pastor Thangngur's Prayer Cave is from this village.
