= Patpuihmun =

Village in Pherzawl District, Manipur, India

- Village
- Location in Manipur, India Patpuihmun (India)
- Coordinates: 24.35257°N 93.07081°E
- Country: India
- State: Manipur
- District: Pherzawl District

Population (2011)
  - Total: 1,929

Languages
  - Official: Hmar
- Time zone: UTC+5:30 (IST)
- Vehicle registration: MN

Patpuihmun is a Hmar village in Pherzawl district, Manipur, India. Chaltonlien Amo, a former Manipur minister and a BJP politician, hails from this village.
