= Muolhoi =

Village in Assam, India

Muolhoi Muolkhawpui
- Village
- Location in Assam, India Muolhoi (India)
- Coordinates: 25.1833°N 93.0333°E
- Country: India
- State: Assam
- District: Dima Hasao

Area
  - Total: 4.5 km^{2} (1.7 sq mi)

Population (2012)
  - Total: 6,100
- Time zone: UTC+5:30 (IST)
- PIN: 788819
- Telephone code: 03673
- Vehicle registration: AS08
- Sex ratio: 100 females per 700 males ♂/♀
- Website: none

Muolhoi is a locality in Haflong Town, of the state of Assam in India. With a resident population 6500+, . The population of Muolhoi strongly reflects the different communities of the ethnic Hmar people.

== Brief history ==
Before the establishment of this village, the area of present-day Muolhoi was originally owned by Sukuna (Dimasa) and Sarphilik (Karbi) an employee working as a Demonstrator in Sericulture Department. As per records of NC Hills, the land was later purchased by four council members of Dima Hasao district; Haolung Hmar(Founder & first Gaon bura of Moulhoi), Sumkhung Hmar, Asekha Khowbung and Somba Feihrem. Gradually more people move in and the village was established with eight houses of Hmar families in 1949, with Haolung Hmar as the first Gaon Bura(Village head) and founder of Muolhoi. The name Muolhoi was given by the predecessors translated it means "Litchi" . It also owes its name to the Litchi fruit, which is called Muolhoi in the Hmar language

== Residents ==
The majority of the population are Hmar.

== Religion ==
The majority of the inhabitants are Protestant Christians, about 99% of the total population, and other religion residing there are Muslim and Hindu.

== Education ==
Muolhoi literacy rate is 90% which greatly reflects the literacy rate of Haflong. Various educational institutes such as Partnership Mission Society, Muolhoi High School, Narzareth Model High School, Elarzet School and various lower primary schools and elementary schools may be found in the vicinity Partnership Mission Society.

== Other places ==
Orphanage

Muolhoi houses the only orphanage in Dima Hasao viz. Nepali Christian Home
