= Watkin Roberts =

Welsh missionary

Watkin R. Roberts (21 September 1886– 20 April 1969) was a Welsh missionary responsible for the initial Christian converts among the Hmar, Paite and other sister tribes in the Churachandpur district and Pherzawl district of Southern Manipur, India. Roberts also created a Christian school in Senvon, near Kangvai, a Vaiphei village. His ministry there touched the family of Rochunga Pudaite who ultimately developed a script for the tribal language with which Pudaite translated the New Testament.

== Biography ==
Roberts was from Caernarvon in Wales where he worked in a stone slate quarry. He was converted through reading some sermons by R. A. Torrey. During the 1904-1905 Welsh Revival Roberts decided to become a foreign missionary. He was a friend of medical doctor Peter Fraser. In 1908 Dr. Fraser and his wife headed for India to be medical missionaries among the Mizo tribal people. They paid for Roberts' passage to join their missionary party. The threesome arrived in Aizawl, India on 9 December 1908.

A letter from Fraser to R. J. Williams, secretary of the Calvinist Methodist Mission Society, speaks of Roberts' level of commitment: "[Roberts] believes he would be disobeying our Lord if he stayed at home now for a number of years." Fraser continues, "It is my duty and privilege to pray that the Lord will send out labourers into His harvest. Mr. Roberts seems to be an answer to that prayer."

At age 22, Roberts was much younger than other missionaries in the area. So, the Mizos immediately dubbed him 'Saptlangvala', the 'Youthful Sahib'. Roberts was still being called that when he was in his eighties.

Over the northern border of Mizoram, people in the Hmar village of Senvawn, Manipur had heard of the Gospel. In 1910 the village chief Kamkholun wrote to the missionaries in Aizawl to ask about the Gospel. The missionary in charge said it was outside the province where British authorities had granted them permission to work. Furthermore, the Hmars were known to be headhunters. However, Roberts sent the Hmar village chief a copy of the Gospel of John translated into the Lushai language. The chief's response was to ask for someone to come and explain what was written in that Gospel.

Roberts told the British government agent in the area that he wanted to visit the Hmars. The agent said, "No, it's too dangerous."

On 5 February 1910 Roberts went anyway and was able to explain the gospel to the people. After a week of teaching, the chief and four other Hmar men announced that they wanted to make peace with the God of the Bible by believing on Jesus Christ. Though Roberts only spent a total of five days with the Hmars, the converts grew in faith and became leaders of a new, energetic church. Within two generations, the entire Hmar tribe had been evangelized. Headhunting stopped.

In 1912, Roberts was suffering from a prolonged bout of enteric fever, so he was sent home to Wales to recuperate. While there he attended the 1914 Keswick Convention. There he met an English woman, Gladys Wescott Dobson, who also had a heart for overseas Christian missionary work. After much prayer, Roberts and Gladys were married at Thoburn Methodist Episcopal Church on 8 March 1915 in Kolkata, India. In 1931 she wrote four verses to the hymn "Wounded for Me" by her friend Rev. W.G. Ovens, which was published in Golden Bells.

Roberts was from the Welsh Calvinist Methodist Church also called the Presbyterian Church of Wales. He established churches on Presbyterian principles, though they had no denominational attachment. He called his mission the Thadou-Kuki Mission, which in 1919 was renamed the North-East India General Mission. In 1924 Roberts visited the United States and received considerable financial support from there. Due to local believers aspirations to spread the Gospel to Burma, the organization was renamed again in 1930 to Indo-Burma Pioneer Mission.

It was not to last though. The British Colonial authorities saw Roberts as a troublemaker who ignored the comity system in which mission organizations were assigned designated geographic regions where they were to be the sole Christian church. For having stayed overnight in Hmar homes where he also ate their food, British authorities expelled Roberts from India. Roberts returned home to Wales, his hopes and dreams shattered. He had no idea what would become of the seed he had planted.

He eventually wound up in Canada, helping lead the Canadian arm of the Regions Beyond Missionary Union. Roberts did not learn of the fruit of his five days with the Hmars until 1956, 46 years after his missionary activity. In 1956, one of his original convert's son, Rochunga Pudaite, was studying at Wheaton College and translating the Bible into the Hmar language. Rochunga learned that Watkins Roberts was living in Toronto, Canada and made a special effort to meet Roberts and was able to report to him that the work Roberts had done among the Hmar tribe was flourishing. Watkins was then 70 years old.

Roberts remained as chair of the Regions Beyond Missionary Union until 1957. He died on 20 April 1969. He was survived by his wife, along with their son and daughter. Gladys Roberts died in Toronto in 1983.

== Movie ==
In 1981 the feature length film Beyond the Next Mountain was released, produced by J.D. Kenneth Bliss. It begins with Roberts' initial missions work in India. It continues with the subsequent events among the Hmar tribe and the family of Chawnga, one of his initial converts. It shows how the Gospel of John changed the course of history for this tribe of headhunters. The film includes Roberts meeting Chawnga's son Rochunga Pudaite who was translating the Bible into their language in Canada, 46 years later.
