= Ngursanglur Sanate =

Indian politician

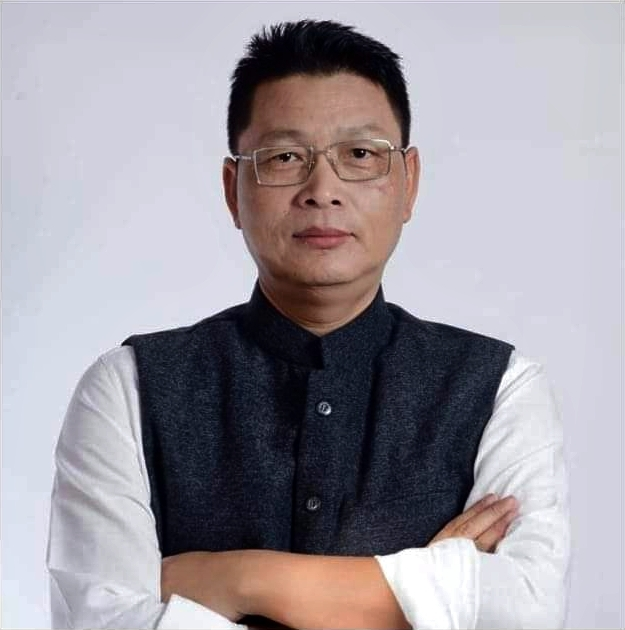

Member of Legislative Assembly in the 12th Manipur Assembly
- In office 2022 - Present
- Preceded by: Dr. Chaltonlien Amo
- Constituency: Tipaimukh

Personal details
- Born: 1 January 1974 (age 52) Zawllien, Parbung, Pherzawl District, Manipur
- Party: Bharatiya Janata Party
- Spouse: Buongthangmawi

Ngursanglur Sanate is an Indian politician. He is a member of the Manipur Legislative Assembly from Tipaimukh Assembly constituency and hails from the Bharatiya Janata Party. He is the son of the late Indian politician Ngurdinglien Sanate who served as a cabinet minister and a deputy speaker of the Manipur Legislative Assembly and had won four times as an MLA from the same constituency. Ngursanglur is from the Hmar tribe.

== Political career ==
Manipur Legislative Assembly (2000–Present)
| Sl. No | Term | Status | Party | Constituency | Opponent(s) |
|---|---|---|---|---|---|
| 1 | 2000-2002 | Won | NCP | Tipaimukh | Dr. Chaltonlien Amo |
| 2 | 2002-2007 | Lost | NCP | Tipaimukh | Dr. Chaltonlien Amo |
| 3 | 2007-2012 | Won | RJD | Tipaimukh | Dr. Chaltonlien Amo |
| 4 | 2012-2017 | Lost | Independent | Tipaimukh | Dr. Chaltonlien Amo, Dr. Lallukhum Fimate |
| 5 | 2017-2022 | Lost | NPP | Tipaimukh | Dr. Chaltonlien Amo, Dr. Lallukhum Fimate |
| 6 | 2022-2027 | Won | JD(U), later BJP | Tipaimukh | Dr. Chaltonlien Amo, Thangthatling |
