= Parbung =

Village in Pherzawl, Manipur, India

Parbung Bungkhawpui
- Village
- Location in Manipur, India Parbung (India)
- Coordinates: 24.24897°N 93.10636°E
- Country: India
- State: Manipur
- District: Pherzawl District.

Population (2011)
  - Total: 2,545

Languages
  - Official: Hmar
- Time zone: UTC+5:30 (IST)
- Vehicle registration: MN

Parbung is a Hmar village in Pherzawl District, Manipur and is the headquarters of the Tipaimukh Sub-Division. Prior to 2017, it used to be the headquarters of the larger Tipaimukh Sub-Division, It is also the center of a district council constituency of the Churachandpur Autonomous District Council.

== History ==
Parbung village was founded by Mr. Ngamneivung in 1897. A memorial stone inscribes the following:

HRIETZINGNA

PARBUNG
KHUO SATTU - NGAMNEIVUNG
HLUO KUM - 11-4-1897
CHAN CHIN THA - 1910
Erected by KLC

Translation:
IN MEMORIAM

PARBUNG
Founder - Ngamneivung
Date of Residence - 11-4-1897
Reception of the Gospel - 1910
Erected by Khawthar Lenglai Club (KLC)

A monolith marking a hundred years of Parbung village is shown below.

=== Village Authority ===
Parbung Village Authority (1961)
| Chairman | Secretary | Members |
|---|---|---|
| H.H. Phaka | Darchunghnung | Thangkung, Chalrosung, Thangsang, T.Ruma, B.L. Thova, Hranghlei, Khumte, Vaia |

== Public Utility ==
The village has a police station and a community hall.

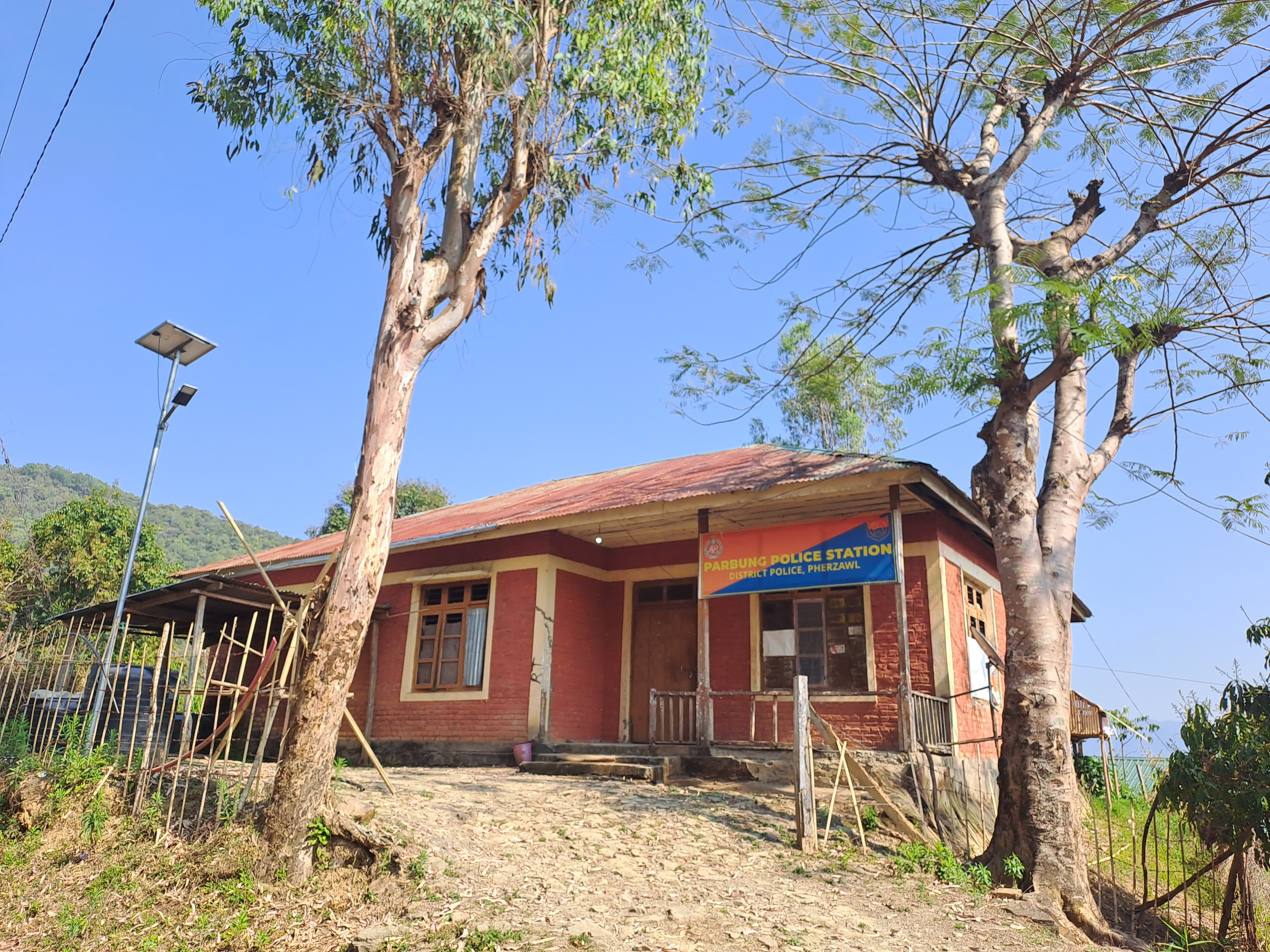
Parbung Police Station

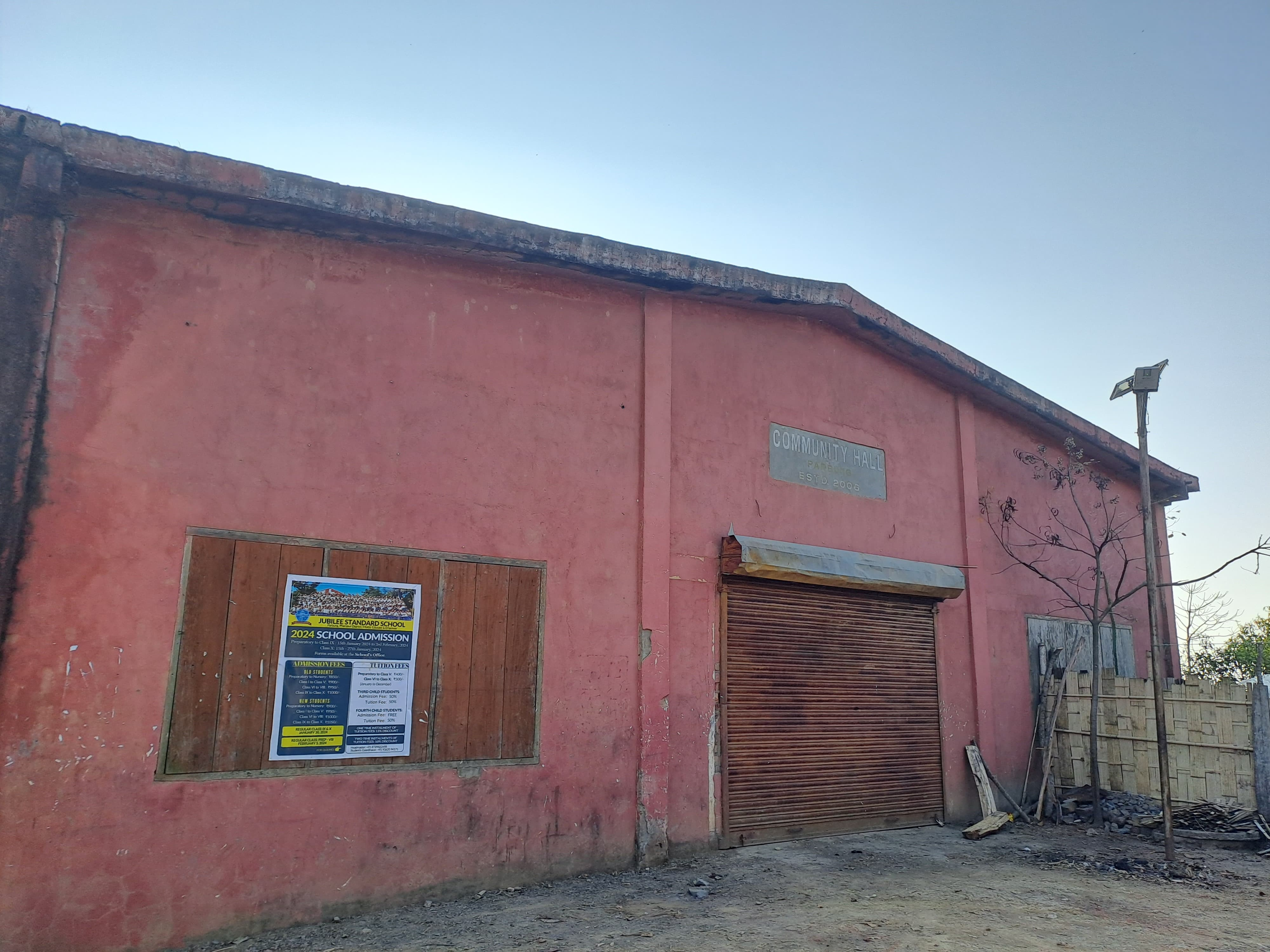
Parbung Community Hall

== Healthcare ==
Community Health Centre (CHC) Parbung or informally, Pherzawl district hospital is the primary healthcare institution

== Transport ==
Parbung Heliport is currently undergoing construction in its final stages.

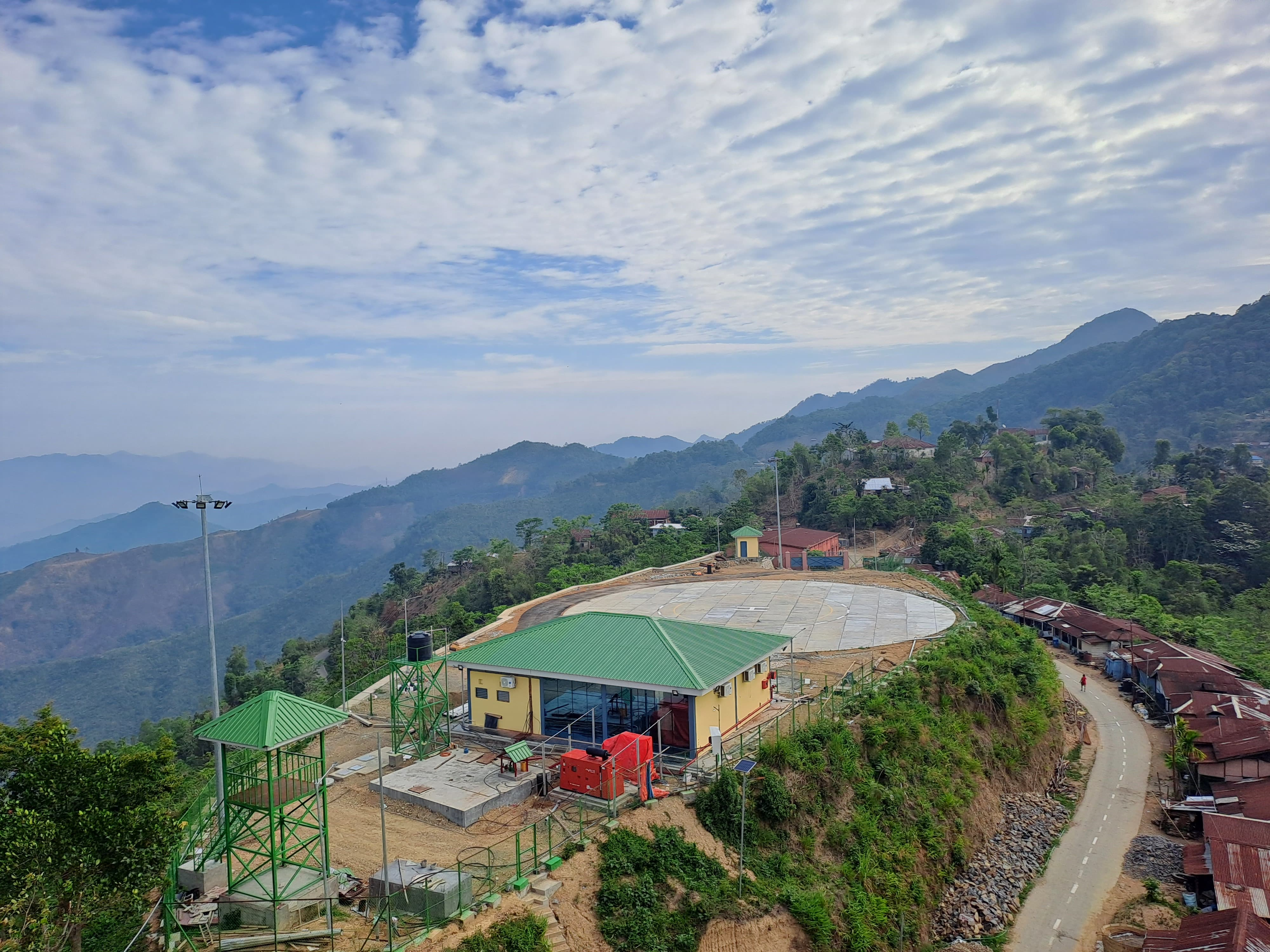
Parbung Heliport

The National Highway 2 (India) runs through Parbung, connecting Manipur and Mizoram by road.

== Schools ==
Parbung has two private and one government run schools.

== Notable people ==
- Ngursanglur Sanate, BJP politician.
- Ngurdinglien Sanate, former Manipur minister.
