= Rochunga Pudaite =

Rochunga Pudaite (4 December 1927 – 10 October 2015) was an Indian minister of Hmar descent. He translated the Bible into the Hmar language and founded Bibles for the World. He was a renowned speaker and an evangelist. His organisation, Bibles for the World, has allowed the distribution of the Christian Bible to millions of people around the world by mailing them Bibles in their languages.

== Life ==
At the close of the 19th century, the British branded the Hmar people of northeast India as "the most brutal headhunters". In 1871, that tribal group beheaded over 500 colonial tea planters and British soldiers during raids at colonial tea plantations in Cachar (Assam), India. Then, on 4 February 1910, a missionary from Wales named Watkin Roberts, armed with a copy of the New Testament, arrived in the area where the tribal group lived. He spent just five days with the Hmars, teaching them about God, focusing on the Gospel of John. Through that lone missionary visit, Chawnga, the father of Rochunga Pudaite, was introduced to the teachings of Jesus.

Chawnga and a few tribesmen believed in what they learned and became dedicated Christians. Chawnga believed that his son Rochunga could be God's instrument to bring the Bible to the Hmar tribe in their own language. To prepare himself for that task, Rochunga studied at St. Paul's Cathedral Mission College in Kolkata and the University of Allahabad. To study Biblical Greek and Hebrew, he attended Glasgow Bible Training Institute, now International Christian College (Scotland), and then Wheaton College (Illinois).

In 1958 Rochunga completed the translation of the New Testament from Greek into the Hmar language. It was a task that included creating a romanized script for Hmar. The checking and editing work and printing took another two years. When the Hmar New Testament was finally printed in 1960 the initial five-thousand copy run sold out within six months. Pudaite later facilitated Bible translations for other tribal languages.

In 1956 while he was studying at Wheaton, Rochunga had a chance to meet Watkin Roberts and was able to report to him that the work Roberts had done among the Hmar tribe was flourishing.

In 1958, Ro (as he came to be called) was named Executive Director of the Indo-Burma Pioneer Mission. In 1959 he and Lalrimawi (Mawii) Pakhuongte were married in India and continued the ministry. In 1968 the organisation was renamed Partnership Mission. In 1973, that ministry—which was then located in Wheaton, IL—became Bibles for the World. Today, Bibles For the World is headquartered in Colorado Springs, Colorado. The ministry focuses on Bible distribution, child sponsorship, and the India Children's Choir. In 1976, Malone University in Canton, Ohio, bestowed on him the honorary Doctorate of Laws, and in 2000, Dallas Baptist University bestowed on him the honorary Doctor of Divinity.

Rochunga Pudaite died at the age of 87, in a Colorado hospital on 10 October 2015, surrounded by his family. He and Mawii had three children; she and their family continue Bibles For The World, with their son, John Pudaite, is President of the ministry.

== Books ==
Rochunga Pudaite authored several books, in addition to his New Testament Bible translation.

- The Education of the Hmar People (Indo-Burma Pioneer Mission, 1963)
- My Billion Bible Dream (Thomas Nelson, 1982)
- The Dime that Lasted Forever (Tyndale House, 1985)
- The Book That Set My People Free (Tyndale House, 1988)
- The Greatest Book Ever Written (Hannibal Books, 1989).

== Biographical books and film ==
Rochunga Pudaite's life is recounted in books and a feature length film.

- God's Tribesman: the Rochunga Pudaite Story (1977) by James and Marti Hefley; Holman Bible Publishers
- God's Tribesman: the Rochunga Pudaite Story (1992) Children's edition, by James and Marti Hefley; Accelerated Christian Education
- Fire on the Hills (1998) by Joe Musser; Tyndale House Publishers
- Beyond the Next Mountain (1981) film producer J.D. Kenneth Bliss
