= Lal Dena =

Indian historian

- Born: 11 January 1939 (age 87), Pherzawl, Manipur, India
- Occupations: Teacher, academic

Academic background
- Education: MA; PhD
- Alma mater: Gauhati University; Jawaharlal Nehru University, New Delhi

Academic work
- Main interests: Modern history, Northeast India, Manipur, Mizoram, Hmar people

Lal Dena (born 11 January 1939) is a historian of modern South Asia with special interest in Manipur and Mizoram. He is a retired professor of Manipur University and the former Vice Chancellor of Sangai International University, Churachandpur. He is from the Hmar tribe.

== Education ==
Prof. Lal Dena passed Class-X from Pherzawl High School in 1959, and did PUC from DM College in 1963. He did BA and MA (History) from Gauhati University completing them in 1970. He received his Ph.D. degree from Jawaharlal Nehru University (JNU), New Delhi in 1982.

== Academic career ==
Prof. Lal Dena taught history at the Department of History, Manipur University, Imphal, and served as its head of department until his retirement. He then joined Sangai International University as the Vice Chancellor.

== Books ==
- Lal Dena (1984). British Policy Towards Manipur,[1891-1919].
- Lal Dena (1988). Christian Missions and Colonialism: A Study of Missionary Movement in Northeast India with Particular Reference to Manipur and Lushai Hills, 1894-1947.Vendrame Institute.
- Lal Dena (1991), History of Modern Manipur, 1826-1949. New Delhi: Omsons (edited).
- Lal Dena (1995). Hmar Folk Tales. Scholar Publishing House.
- Lal Dena (2008). In Search of Identity: Hmars of North East India. Akansha.
- Lal Dena (2011). Dialogue on Tipaimukh Dam.Akansha Publishing House (edited)
- Thangsawihmang & Lal Dena (2022). "Hmar Indigenous Games."
- Lal Dena (2025). The Hmar Culture Relics: Historical Monuments in Pherzawl District. Hmar Art and Culture Society
