= Marina Lalramnghaki Hmar =

Indian field hockey player

Marina Lalramnghaki
Personal information
- Born: Marina Lalramnghaki Hmar; 12 June 2001 (age 25) Mizoram, India

Sport
- Sport: Field hockey
- Position: Midfielder
Senior career
Years	Team	Caps	Goals
–	Sports Authority of India	-	-
National team
Years	Team	Caps	Goals
2019–2022	India U21	9	(0)

Marina Lalramnghaki Hmar is an Indian field hockey player who plays as a midfielder for the Indian national team.
