= Pherzawl =

- Village
- Location within Manipur
- Coordinates: 24.2616°N 93.1895°E
- Country: India
- State: Manipur
- District: Pherzawl District
- Established: 1894
- Founder: Bulhmang Infimate, 1894

Government
  - Body: Pherzawl Village Authority

Population
  - Total: 2,100

Language(s)
  - Official: Hmar is the official language of Pherzawl

Literacy rate
  - 2011 census: 85.75%
- Time zone: UTC+5:30 (IST)
- PIN: 795143
- Vehicle registration: MN
- Website: https://pherzawl.nic.in/

Pherzawl (anglicized: Perdʒo:l) is the headquarter of the Pherzawl District of Manipur, India. Pherzawl district was created by bifurcating Churachandpur district.

Pherzawl is also the Sub-Divisional headquarter of Pherzawl Sub-Division, one of the four sub-divisional blocks of the district.

== People ==
According to the 2011 census, Pherzawl town has population of 1558 of which 818 are males while 740 are females. Pherzawl village has higher literacy rate compared to Manipur. In 2011, literacy rate of Pherzawl village was 85.75% compared to 76.94% of Manipur. In Pherzawl town, Male literacy stands at 86.67% while female literacy rate was 84.74%.
