= Pherzawl district =

- District of Manipur
- Interactive map of Pherzawl district
- Coordinates (Pherzawl): 24.25°N 93.19°E
- Country: India
- State: Manipur
- Established: 2016
- Headquarters: Pherzawl

Area
  - Total: 2,128 km^{2} (822 sq mi)
  - Rank: 5

Population
  - Total: 47,259
  - Density: 22.21/km^{2} (57.52/sq mi)

Demographics
  - Literacy: 69.03%

Language(s)
  - Official: Hmar language
- Time zone: UTC+05:30 (IST)
- Vehicle registration: MN0
- Major highways: NH-150, NH-2
- Website: pherzawl.nic.in

Pherzawl district is located in the southern part of the state of Manipur. It is bounded on the east by Churachandpur District; on the north by Tamenglong District, Noney District and Jiribam district; on the west by the Cachar District of Assam and on the South by Sinlung Hills, Mizoram. Pherzawl District has approximately 200 villages. The district headquarters is Pherzawl.

== History ==
The Pherzawl district was formed in 2017 from two western subdivisions of Churachandpur district, viz., Tipaimukh subdivision and Thanlon subdivision. Two more subdivisions have since been created: Vangai Range subdivision out of Tipaimukh, and the Pherzawl subdivision out of Thanlon. The latter is described as "non-functional", which probably means that it does not have separate subdivisional offices. The district was inaugurated on 16 December 2018 by chief minister Okram Ibobi Singh.

== Geography ==
The district covers a total area of 2285 sq.km, characterized by rugged hill terrain with prominent rivers such as Barak (Tuiruong), Tuipi, Tuivai, and Hringtuinek (Sartuinek), along with numerous streams and rivulets. Tipaimukh (Ruonglevaisuo), the confluence of Tuivai and Barak rivers, serves as a significant trading hub and port for river transportation. It is also the proposed site for the controversial Tipaimukh Dam project, aimed at flood control and Hydroelectric power generation. Pherzawl District experiences a humid subtropical climate, with moderately fertile soil conducive to agriculture. The district's main crops include rice, maize, and ginger, with agriculture being the primary occupation of the residents.

The region falls within a humid subtropical climate classification. Its soil composition predominantly consists of moderately fertile clay loam, interspersed with patches of clay and loam. Temperature fluctuations span from a minimum of 3.4 °C (38.1 °F) to a maximum of 34.1 °C (93.4 °F). Annual precipitation levels vary between 670 to 1,450 mm (26 to 57 in).

== Administration ==
Pherzawl District is administered by a Deputy Commissioner, supported by an Additional Deputy Commissioner, Sub-Divisional Officer, and other field staff. The district is divided into four sub-divisions, each with its own administrative setup, including a Sub-Divisional Officer responsible for both administrative and developmental initiatives. Its current MLA is Ngursanglur Sanate from Tipaimukh AC, a constituency which covers the majority of Pherzawl district.

== Facilities ==
Pherzawl district is connected with the state capital Imphal via National Highway 2. There is also helicopter service at Parbung. A bus service running between Imphal and Pherzawl began in 2017. The district has one Community Health Centre (CHC) at Parbung.

== Notable people ==
- Ngursanglur Sanate
- Chaltonlien Amo
- Lal Dena
- Ngurdinglien Sanate
- Lalthlamuong Keivom
- Rochunga Pudaite

== See also ==
- List of populated places in Pherzawl district
- Hmar Ethnic Cultural Sites
