= Hmar people =

Ethnic group in Northeast India

Hmar
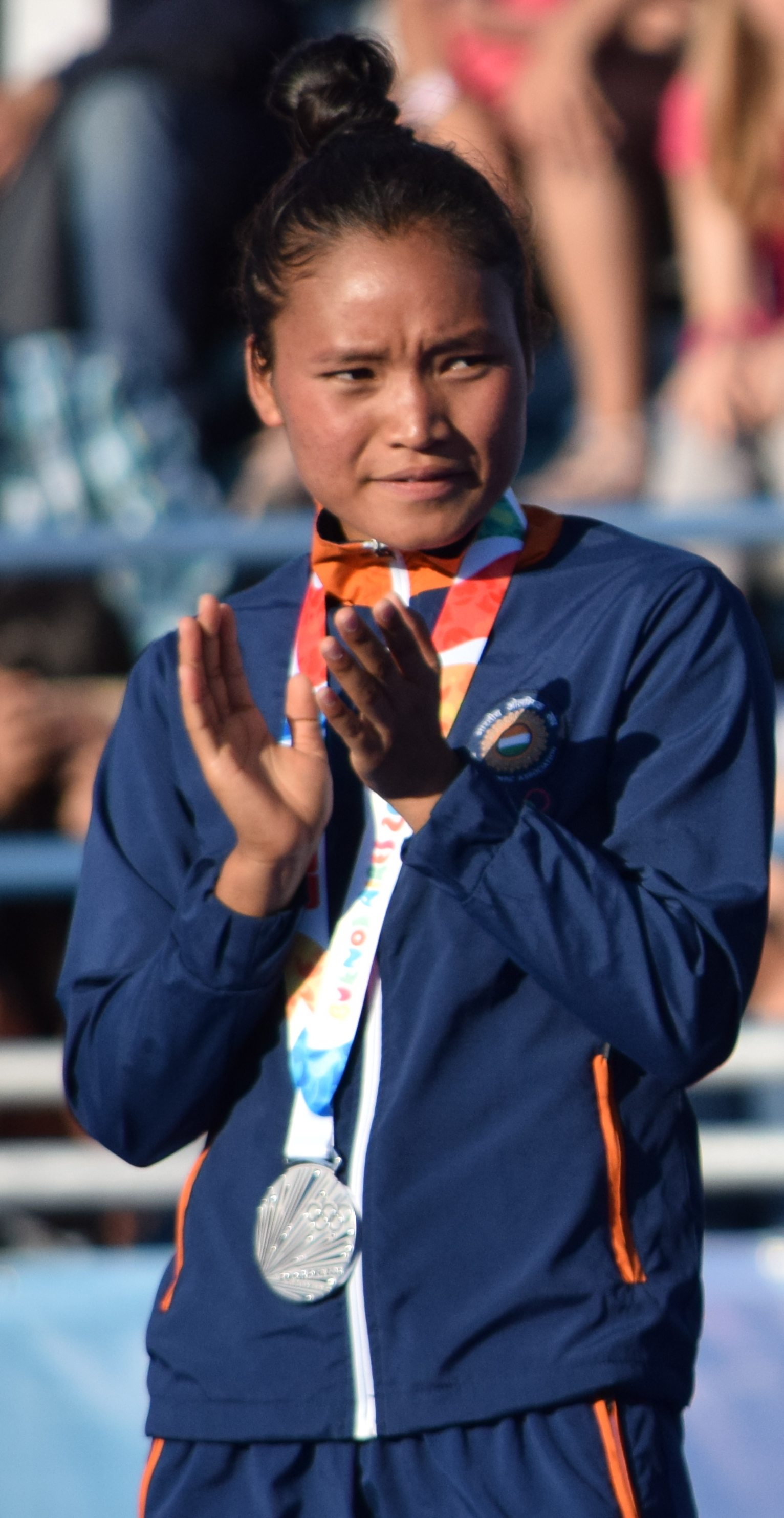
- Lalremsiami Hmarzote, a Hmar field hockey player

Regions with significant populations
- India

Languages
- Hmar language

Religion
- Christianity

Related ethnic groups
- Mizo people

Hmar people are a scheduled tribe ethnic group from the states of Manipur, Mizoram, Assam, and Meghalaya in Northeast India. They use the Hmar language as their primary language. In 2023, the Hmar Inpui, an apex body of the tribe, 'reaffirmed' the identity of the Hmar people as Mizo.

== History ==
The Hmar people were initially a nomadic group, moving from place to place in search of “greener pastures.” The term Hmar itself refers to 'north' (northern direction). After eventually settling in Mizoram, where they are considered among the earliest settlers, a significant portion later dispersed to the neighbouring states of Manipur, Tripura, Assam, and Meghalaya.

== Population ==
According to the 2011 Indian Census, there were 98,988 Hmar speakers (as first language). The Hmar population itself (including Hmar people who speak Mizo language as their first language) roughly stands at 200,000–300,000. Several critics and scholars point out that a significant population of the Hmar people are fully 'Mizonised' in Mizoram, and hence do not identify as "Hmar tribe", but as "Any Mizo tribes" in census reports.

== Language ==
Hmar people use the Hmar language, which closely resembles the Mizo language and uses the Roman script. The script was introduced by British missionaries, including 'Pu Buanga' (James Herbert Lorrain), during the colonial era in India and is locally known as the 'A Aw B.' Hmar language is within the Tibeto-Burman stock of languages.

== Religion ==
The majority of the Hmar people practice Christianity. They were Christianized by Welsh missionaries in the 1910s (specifically at Senvawn village). Animism was traditionally dominant among the Hmar.

== Place of origin ==
The Hmar people traditionally regard Sinlung as their ancestral homeland. However, the geographical location of Sinlung remains unverified and continues to be a subject of scholarly debate.

== Notable people ==
Politicians
Name	Notes
HT Sangliana	Indian policeman and former Lok Sabha MP. A South Indian movie, Sangliyana, was made in honor of him.
Robert Romawia Royte	MLA from Mizoram and owner of Aizawl FC.
Ngurdinglien Sanate	Former Minister from Manipur.
Lalnghinglova Hmar	Current Minister of State (Sports) and MLA from Mizoram.
Ngursanglur Sanate	Current MLA from Manipur.
Lalhmingthanga Hrangchal	Former Deputy Chief Minister of Mizoram, Chief of Mizoram People's Conference.
Bijoy Kumar Hrangkhawl	Politician from Tripura.
Pachhunga Hmar	First President of the Mizo Union.
Chaltonlien Amo	Former Minister from Manipur.
Lalmuanpuia Punte	Current Political Advisor to Lalduhoma and MLA, Mizoram.
K. Sapdanga	Current Home Minister, Mizoram.

Sportspersons
Name	Contribution(s)
Lalremsiami	India women's national field hockey team player
Marina Lalramnghaki Hmar	India women's national field hockey team player
David Lalhlansanga	India national football team member
Alfred Lalroutsang	youngest ever player to play in the Indian Super League at the age of 16 years.
Lalrinliana Hnamte	Indian professional footballer.
Lalvarmoi Hmar	Indian professional footballer.
Lalram Luaha	Indian professional footballer
Hmar Zothanchhunga	Indian professional cricketer.
Nazareth Lalthazuala Hmar	Indian professional mixed martial artist.

Academics & Authors
Name	Notes
Rochunga Pudaite	Included the Hmar people, Anāl people, and many others as one of the Schedule Tribes of India, 1956, and the founder of Bibles for the World.
Lal Dena	Manipur historian.
Lalthlamuong Keivom	Former Indian diplomat and writer of Zoram Khawvel series.
Zirsangzela Hnamte	Author.
Lallukhum Fimate	Former Director, Regional Institute of Medical Sciences and Zoram Medical College.

Singers, Composers & Musicians
Name	Notes
Mami Varte	Singer
Esther Hnamte	Singer
Lalruotmawi	Singer
Buonglienkung	Composer
Thangngur	Composer
Lienrum	Composer

== Clans (Pahnam) ==
Darngawn
Ruolngul	Faiheng	Tlau	Fatlei
Banzang	Sinate	Famhawite (Famhoite)	Chonghmunte
Lamchangte	Sanate		

Faihriem
Saivate	Khawral	Khawkheng	Tuollai
Tuimuol	Bapui	Tusing	Khawlum
Sekong	Seling	Thlangnung	Salhmar
Dulien	Aimuol	Khawhrang	Sote
Thanghnieng			

Ngurte^{descendants of Santleichal}
Sanate	Saingur	Zallien	Bungran
Chiluon	Singa	Tuolthla	Para Thla
Pusingathla	Saidangthla		

Hrangkhol
Ponatu	Phuoitong	Dumker	Cholkha

Khuolhring (Khawlhring)
Lungen	Thlaute	Midang	Leidir
Suokling	Chunthang	Lozun	Pieltel
Milai	Rawlsim	Khintung	Zahrin

Khawbung^{descendants of Tingkul}
Fenate (Fente)	Pangamte	Pazamte	Riengsete
Laising	Muolphei	Phunte (Punte)	Bunglung
Sierthlang	Siersak		

Lawitlang
Hrangchal	Laiasung	Sielasung	Darasung
Tungte	Sungte	Suomte	Tlawmte
Chawnsim			

Rawite
Pieltu	Sawrte	Buite	Arro
Zate	Aite	Hnungte	Seldo

Zote (Joute)^{descendants of Vanso}
Pusiete	Chuonkhup	Singphun	Hriler
Chawnghau	Chawngvawr	Buonsuong	Chawngtuol
Barkhawlai	Tlangte	Parate	Saihmang (Saiate, Sailung, Saite)
Ngaiate	Chawnhnieng	Darte	Darkhawlai
Vaithang	Thangsuok	Maubuk	Hrangngam
Hrangdo	Hrangate	Chawngsieksim	Ngaite (Hauler, Tlurha, Saichawnkhup, Sailientuol)
Hmangte	Chante (Chamte)	Hrangsote	Parate (Bualthang, Khawtial, Rualngai, Zani)

Leiri
Neingaite	Puruolte	Pudaite	Pulamte
Puhnuongte	Thlandar		

Changsan
Zilchung	Zilhmang	Ngulthuom	Ngaithuom
Hrawte	Hranhnieng	Chaileng	Thangngen
Kellu	Armei		

Ṭhiek
Athu	Amaw (Amo)	Tuolor	Thilsong
Buhril	Hekte	Ralsun	Chawnghekte
Thluchung (TC)	Kungate	Selate	Tuolte
Ṭaite	Hnamte	Kangbur	Khawzawl
Lalum	Laldau	Saibung	Vankal
Pangote	Pangulte	Khawbuol	Pakhumate
Khumthur	Khumsen	Thlihran	Tamte
Hmante	Chawnnel	Zate	

Lungṭau
Mihriemate	Songate	Infimate (Fimate)	Nungate
Intoate	Lungchuong	Inbuon	Pasulate
Keivawm (Keivom)	Tamhrang	Sielhnam	Theisiekate
Thlawngate	Khumsen	Khumthur	Sunate

== Ethnic Cultural Items ==
Traditional Shawls
Name	Original Designer
Hmarpuon	Fimneizo
Thangsuopuon	Lieni Hmar
Ngoteker	
Puonlaisen	
Hmaram	

== Legacy ==
The Hmar people are credited as the first settlers of Champhai, Mizoram until they left the place and the Ralte people came in to later occupy it. Old stone structures, such as the Sikpui Lung (a monolith associated with a particular festival of the Hmar people) can still be found to this day. The inscription on the monolith reads:

HE LUNG HI HMANLAI HMAR HO SIKPUI A NI TIN KEINI KUM 28.12.1918 A HIAN KAN AWM TA. ZAHULA SAILO

Rough Translation:

This is the stone erected by the Hmars in the past to commemorate Sikpui, and we have now occupied this place from 28.2.1918, Zahula Sailo

The Sikpui Hlapui is associated with the Hmar people. This folk song is used by the Bnei Menashe people of Northeast India to claim an alleged connection to the state of Israel.

== Literature ==
Vanlal Tluonga Bapui

- (1996). Hmar Grammar. Mysore: Central Institute of Indian Languages. CIIL Press, Mysore.
- (2011). Oral Traditions of the Hmars. Assam Institute of Research For Tribals and Scheduled Castes: Guwahati, Assam, India.
- (2012). Hmar Ṭawng Inchukna (A Lexical Study of the Hmar Language & Usages). Guwahati, Assam: The Assam Institute of Research for Tribals and Scheduled Castes. Hi-Tech Printing & Binding Industries, Guwahati

Lal Dena

- (1995). Hmar Folk Tales. New Delhi: Scholar Publishing House. Bengal Printing Press, New Delhi.
- (2008). In Search of Identity: Hmars of North-East India; New Delhi 2008.
- (2011). Dialogue on Tipaimukh Dam.Akansha Publishing House (edited).
- (2025). The Hmar Culture Relics: Historical Monuments in Pherzawl District. Hmar Art and Culture Society.

Lalthlamuong Keivom (L Keivom)

- (1960). Thalai Hlabu.
- (1963). Thralai Hlabu.
- (1974). The Gitanjali (translated).
- (1980). Hmar Hla Suina.
- (1991 onwards). Zoram Khawvel 1–8.
- (2000). Zangkhaw Bungbu.
- (2001). Nun Ram, Ka Nun.
- (2007). Baibul (Hmar)-Holy Bible, Delhi Version.
- (2011). Thukhawchang (Vol 1). Zolife Publication: Aizawl, Mizoram.
- (2017). Hmar Hla Suina. James Keivom.
- (2018). Translation: thu le hla inlet. Sinlung Academy of Letters.
- Thuthlung Ram
- Pherzawl Titi

L Fimate

- (2021) Thina Râpthlak.

RH Hminglien

- (1997). Hmangaitu Hmel.

FT Hminga

- (1991). Hmar Pipu Thilhming Lo Phuokhai. Churachandpur, Manipur: Dr. FT Hminga.
- (1993). Hmar Ṭawng Indiklem. Churachandpur, Manipur: Dr. FT Hminga.
- (1994). Hming Umzie Neihai. Churachandpur, Manipur: Dr. FT Hminga.

SN Ngurte

- (1991). Damlai Thlaler.
- (1994). Rengchawnghawi.
- (1995). Kanaan Phaizawl. HL Lawma & Sons Publication.
- (2011). Bible Ram.
- (2018). Chawngngo, Zochung Lanu Hmeltha.

Jonathan Pudaite

- (1982). Beyond The Next Mountain: The Story of Rochunga Pudaite. Tyndale House Publishers.
- (2011). The Legacy of Watkin R. Roberts.

Rochunga Pudaite

- (1960). Tlangchar Tuihnar.
- (1961). The Glory of God.
- (1963). The Education of the Hmar People. Sielmat, Churachandpur. Indo-Burma Pioneer Mission, 1963.
- (1985), The Dime That Lasted Forever. Carol Stream, Illinois: Tyndale House Publishers.
- (2008). English-Hmar Dictionary. Partnership Publishing House.
- (2011). Ka Hring Nun Vol-1. Thomson Press, Harayana.

Rosiem Pudaite

- (2002). Indian National Struggle for Freedom and its Impact on the Mizo Movement (1935–1953 AD).

John H. Pulamte

- (2011). Hmar Bûngpui Pastor Thangngur. Imphal, Manipur: Dr. John H. Pulamte. BCPW, Imphal.

Jacob Pudaite

- (2017) Missiological Approach to the Meitei.

Darsanglien Ruolngul

- (1963). Thudik Thedikna.
- (2009). The Advance of the Gospel (Part One). Churachandpur, Manipur: Rev. Darsanglien Ruolngul. SMART * tech Offset Printers, Churachandpur.
- (2013). Kohran. Churachandpur, Manipur: ICI. Diamond Offset, Churachandpur.
- Zawlnei Isai Inchukna
- Chanchintha Kalchawi (Part 1 & 2).

Ngurthangkhum Sanate

- (1984). Ngurte Pahnam Chanchin. Churachandpur, Manipur

Thangsawihmang Sawngate

- (2012). Hmangaina Parbâwr. Churachandpur, Manipur.

Lalthankhum Sinate

- (2001). Kohran Hring.

JC Thangsiem

- Zilsi Varzan. Rengkai, Churachandpur.

Hrilrokhum Thiek

- (1996). Maichâma Mei Chu Sukchawk Zing Ding A Nih.
- (2013). History of the Hmars in North East India, Guwahati, Assam: Rev. Hrilrokhum Ṭhiek, Bhabani Offset Private Ltd., Guwahati.

H Thuomte

- (2001). Joute Pahnam Inthladan (Joute Genealogy). Churachandpur, Manipur
- Various. (2008). Lal Remruot – Saidan Chanchin. Delhi. Hmanglien & Sons. Rai's Ad-venture, Delhi.

H Zaneisang

- (2003). Sinlung. Churachandpur, Manipur: H. Zaneisang. Diamond Offset, Churachandpur.

Timothy Z Zote

- (2007). Manmasi Year Book (Vol-II), Churachandpur, Manipur: Manmasi Year Book Editorial Board. BCPW, Imphal.
- (2015). Sixth Schedule le District Council Hmelhmang.

Immanuel Zarzosang

- with Lalthakim Hmar (ed). (2016). Highland Musing. 2016. IndigeNE: Imphal.
- (2014). Hmar at the Crossroads. IndigeNE: Imphal.
- (2014). Culture and Development: Hmar of Tipaimukh in Transition. IndigeNE: Imphal..

Ngurrivung

- (2014). Hung Ro Indinthar Nawk Ei Tiu.
- (2016). Hnam Rolung 2015-2016 Rochunga Pudaite

Hmar Writers Club

- (2021). Hnam Ro. Hmar Writers Club, GHQ.
- (202*). Hnam Ro 2. Hmar Writers Club, GHQ.

Siekkhohen Tamhrang

- (2018). Muolkhawpui.

J C Chongkholien

- (2021). Rengkai Lal - Kailien: A Khawsathai le a Thlahai.

Dony Tuolte

- Ka Tawnhriet (Vol 1 & II)

Jami Darngawn

- Lalpa Mi Pawlna

=== Academic Papers ===
Robert L Sungte

- (2007). Impact of Religious Journals on the Hmar tribe in Manipur, Karnataka. Mangalore University, Mangalore.

Immanuel Zarzosang

- (2016). "Revisiting Sikpui Ruoi of the Hmar Tribe." Anthropology Today. Vol. 1, No. 2. ISSN 2454-2709. Pp. 60–72.
- (2017). "In Search of the "Holy" Confluence: A Journey to the Barak River." In: Queenbala Marak (Ed) "Doing Autoethnography". Serials Publications: New Delhi.
- (2019). Ruolevaisuo a Hohlimna Thusim Thlirletna. 2019. In: Nunhlui-II (Hmar MIL Textbook for TDC Third Semester), Assam University, Silchar, Hmar Literature Society, Assam.
- (2014). "Traditional concepts on honour, wealth, happiness and self-reliance vis-á-vis planned development: Case of the Hmars." In: Aheibam Koireng Singh, Amol Sanasam and Sushma Phurailatpam (Ed) "Knowing Manipur from Endogenous Perspective". Centre for Manipur Studies, Manipur University and Indian Council of Social Science Research: Imphal. Vol. 2.
- (2011). "Indigenous Knowledge System, Identity, Freedom and Tipaimukh Dam: An Anthropological Perspective." In: Lal Dena (Ed) "Dialogue on Tipaimukh Dam". Akansha Publishing House: New Delhi.
- (2005). Pre-historical Heritage of Ruong Le Vaisuo. "Hmar Arasi". Souvenir on the occasion of Cultural Festival-cum-Sikpui Ruoi, 2 – 5 December & 50th General Assembly-cum-Literary Meet, 15 – 16 December. Hmar Students' Association General Headquarters: Churachandpur.
- with R. Th. Varte. (2017). "Hmar Traditional Practices in Conflict Resolution: An Anthropological Perspective." In: Melvil Pereira, Bitopi Dutta and Binita Kakati (Ed) "Legal Pluralism and Indian Democracy: Tribal Conflict Resolution Systems in Northeast India". Routledge: New York.

Marina Laltlinzo Infimate

- (2022). "Causativization in Hmar." Himalayan Linguistics.

== See also ==
- Hmar Ethnic Cultural Sites
- Hmar language
