= Durgapur, Manipur =

Village in Manipur, India

Durgapur Lamtai Khunou
- Village
- Interactive map of Durgapur
- Location in Manipur, India Durgapur (India)
- Coordinates: 24.5967°N 93.0969°E
- Country: India
- State: Manipur
- District: Jiribam

Area
  - Total: 236.5 km^{2} (91.3 sq mi)

Population (2011)
  - Total: 434
  - Density: 1.84/km^{2} (4.75/sq mi)

Language(s)
  - Official: Meitei
- Time zone: UTC+5:30 (IST)
- Vehicle registration: MN
- Website: manipur.gov.in

Durgapur is a census village in the Borobekra subdivision, Jiribam district, Manipur, India. It is about 35 km south of Jiribam, the headquarters of the district, close to the border with the Pherzawl district in the south. The village is on the bank of the Barak River, spanning a narrow valley between two forested hilly areas. The Barak River flows north in this region, up to Jirimukh, where it turns northwest. The Barak River also forms the border with the Assam state of India.

A Meitei village called Lamtai Khunou (Note: Alternative spellings: "Lamdai Khunou", and "Laimatai".) is seen to have sprung up in the area around 2010 and is now identified with the Durgapur village itself. The neighbouring villages of Durgapur are Madhupur (Note: Alternative spelling: "Modhupur".) to the west and Choudhurikhal (Note: Alternative spellings: "Chaudhurikhal" and "Chowdhurikhal".) to the east. Choudhurikhal is the southernmost village of Jiribam district.

== Geography and History ==
The entire Vangaitang range adjacent to the present-day Jiribam district was part of the Cachar kingdom at the beginning of the 19th century. After annexing the kingdom in 1832, the British transferred the Vangaitang range to Manipur, setting the border along the western stretch of Barak River (Note: The Barak River flows south till Tipaimukh and then makes an almost 180°-bend to flow north till Jirimukh.) and the Jiri River. In 1907, the Manipur government opened the "Jiribam valley" between the rivers and the Vangaitang range for agricultural settlement, and, by 1911, 14,346 bighas of land is said to have been settled. Most of the settlers in Jiribam came from Cachar, very few from the Imphal Valley (Manipur valley). They included Bengalis as well as Meiteis. Rice and sugarcane were cultivated, and betel leaf (pan) in areas unsuitable for rice cultivation.

=== Independent India ===
Durgapur was an established settlement before the independence of India. Borobekra, to the north of Durgapur, was a market town that ran a Friday market, which was the main market for the people on the Barak River as far away as Pherzawl. (Note: Pherzawl itself is not on the bank of the Barak River, but it could access the river through a port called Taithu-ghat nearby.)

Initially, Jiribam subdivision was formed to encompass the Vangaitang range from the Jiri River in the north and Tipaimukh in the south. In due course, the southern and eastern hill regions were transferred to the Churachandpur district (now Pherzawl district), leaving only the valley and some of the foothills regions in the Jiribam subdivision. The border between the Jiribam and Pherzawl districts runs near Chaudhurikhal, adjacent to Durgapur. Savomphai to its south lies in Pherzawl district.

=== Insurgencies ===
According to multiple sources, the proscribed Meitei insurgent groups, United National Liberation Front (UNLF) and People's Liberation Army of Manipur (PLA), used the Jiribam valley and the neighbouring Cachar district of Assam as their main area of operations. The region was originally used by Meitei insurgent groups in the 1960s as a launching pad to access the training camps run by Inter-Services Intelligence (ISI) in East Pakistan (present-day Bangladesh). With the liberation of Bangladesh in 1971, this activity was briefly halted, but it resumed in 1975 with the advent of military rule in Bangladesh.

Security expert E. M. Rammohan states that the hilly region bounded by NH-37 (Note: NH-37 was earlier called National Highway 53.) in the north, Thangjing Hills in the east, Tipaimukh Road in the south, and the Jiribam–Tipaimukh Road on the west, was a "free zone", with minimal presence of security forces, which was adopted by UNLF, PLA and Hmar People's Convention–Democracy for setting up camps and bases. The PLA and UNLF are said to have entered this area after the Kuki-Naga conflict (in the 1990s) by helping resettle the displaced Kukis in Churachandpur district and obtaining land in return. Rammohan also states that HPC-Democracy was allied with UNLF.

In the 1990s, UNLF is said to have forcibly driven out many Bengali residents of the Borobekra region, settling Meiteis in their place. The local residents complain that around the year 2000, the people of Durgapur were evicted and had to leave for the Cachar district in Assam. Manipuris (Meiteis) that came from Bangladesh were settled down in these areas. They complained that even newly settled Meiteis were given land deeds (pattas) whereas the older settlers were denied land deeds. An organisation called Jiribam Development Organisation claimed credit for getting land deeds issued.

=== Lamtai Khunou ===
A field visit by the Federation of Regional Indigenous Societies (FREINDS) to the region in 2011 mentioned a Meitei village called "Laimatai". According to the team, villages such as Durgapur and others were "full of Bangladesh Muslims, Bengalis and Bishnupriyas" but the lands owned by Meitei in Laimatai were not taken over by the "illegal migrants". (Note: The ideology of the organisation regards only the Meiteis and tribals as "indigenous" to Manipur, and ignores the fact that the Jiribam was part of Cachar before it was transferred to Manipur in 1833.)

In 2013, the name of the village was mentioned as Lamtai Khunou. In that year, an official of the Lamtai Khunou Youth Club stated that the village had no primary school, and that the children were having to go to Bengali medium schools. The villagers had a list of grievances against the government inaction in their village.

By 2024, news sources began to identify Lamtai Khunou with the Durgapur village itself. As per a news report in July 2024, there were 86 Meitei households in Lamtai Khunou. Since the whole of Durgapur had only 93 households in the 2011 census, it would imply that Lamtai Khunou had become the predominant settlement in Durgapur. According to a social worker, 200 original families that had been driven out of Durgapur were living in Cachar as of 2015.

== Demographics ==
The Durgapur census village has a population of 434 people as per the 2011 census. It has no Scheduled Tribes. The neighbouring village of Madhupur to the west has a population of 156 people, of whom only 5 belonged to Scheduled Tribes.

The village of Choudhurikhal to the east of Durgapur has a population of 136 people, all of whom are Scheduled Tribes.

== 2023–2025 Manipur violence ==
When the ethnic conflict in Manipur erupted between the Meiteis and Kuki-Zo people on 3 May 2023, the Jiribam district remained relatively at peace for almost a year. Durgapur's Lamtai Khunou experienced an isolated instance of violence on 28 March 2024, when a bomb explosion damaged three shops owned by a businessman, with losses amounting to Rs. 10 lakh (1 million). The perpetrators were never identified, but the Kuki Inpi of the region attributed the bombing to UNLF militants months later.

The relative peace of Jiribam district was shattered by twin murders in May–June 2024, the first of a Kuki individual named Seigoulen Singson in May, and the second of a Meitei individual named Soibam Saratkumar Singh in June. Rumours spread that Saratkumar's body was founded beheaded, inflaming Meitei feelings. Meitei mobs led by Arambai Tenggol started torching houses in the Jiribam area, prompting the Hmars and Thadou Kukis to flee to relief camps in neighbouring Assam.

This invited retaliation by Hmars and Thadou Kukis in the Borobekra subdivision in the south. On 6 June, the residents of Lamtai Khunou and other neighbouring Meitei villages heard that their villages were being surrounded by militants, and fled to the nearest police station. The district authorities evacuated 239 Meitei people to a shelter in a sports complex in Jiribam. On 8 June, armed tribals (referred to as "suspected militants" in the media) set fire to several Meitei houses at Lamtai Khunou, Madhupur and other Meitei villages. The displaced Meitei do not know whether they have houses to return to.
