= List of populated places in Jiribam district =

Villages in Jiribam district of Manipur, India

The Jiribam district of Manipur state in India is divided into 2 sub-divisions called circles. At the time of the 2011 Census of India, the area was a part of the Imphal East district: the Jiribam district was created in 2016.

== Subdivisions ==
The district is sub-divided into two subdivisions (which are often referred to as "circles" for historical reasons):

- Jiribam subdivision
- Borobekra subdivision

== Towns ==
The district has one municipality:

Name	Type	Block	Population	Effective literacy rate	Sex ratio	SC population %	ST population %	Census code (2011)
Jiribam	Municipal Council	Jiribam	7343	88.8%	920	2.48%	17.87%	801493

== Villages ==
The district has following villages, with population figures from the 2011 census:

=== Jiribam subdivision ===
Name	Population	Effective literacy rate	Sex ratio	SC population %	ST population %	Census code (2011)
Uchathol	1180	89.26%	370	7.37%	1.78%	270154
Chindong Leikai (Chingdong Leikai / Patchao)	1249	84.37%	1092	0.0%	0.64%	270159
Dibong	1163	89.0%	1048	0.0%	0.69%	270160
Mahadebpur (Mahadevpur)	30	26.09%	875	0.0%	6.67%	270161
Kamaranga (Kamranga)	1915	67.49%	997	0.0%	11.33%	270162
Kamrangha Kuki (Karmaranghal Kuki Punji)	0	NA	NA	NA	NA	270163
Sonapur	2320	56.37%	946	0.0%	0.0%	270164
Aglapur	918	56.76%	1040	0.0%	0.0%	270165
Lalpani	1375	51.3%	1007	0.0%	0.0%	270166
Islamabad	679	79.44%	1039	0.0%	0.0%	270167
Champanagar Meitei	560	90.0%	1007	0.0%	0.36%	270168
Champanagar Muslim	590	67.42%	909	0.0%	0.0%	270170
Rasidpur (Rashidpur)	210	40.0%	909	0.0%	0.0%	270171
Jarolpokpi (Jairalpokpi)	1287	66.29%	863	0.0%	64.18%	270172
Kashimpur	1307	59.34%	897	0.0%	0.0%	270173
Mullargao	836	51.52%	887	0.0%	0.0%	270174
Leishabithol	231	80.31%	1100	0.0%	13.42%	270175
Nungkhal	318	80.62%	860	0.0%	0.0%	270176
Ahamadabad (Ahemedabad)	1816	46.75%	983	0.0%	0.0%	270177
Chandranathpur	580	74.84%	940	48.97%	1.72%	270178
Binselu (Bensellu)	226	41.48%	1036	99.12%	0.88%	270179
Berabak (Berabag)	175	71.03%	923	95.43%	0.57%	270180
Nungphou	595	76.19%	970	55.13%	43.87%	270181
Latingkhal	1525	83.49%	975	92.26%	2.23%	270182
Baiboni (Bhaiboni)	534	98.14%	935	87.08%	11.42%	270183
Dholakhal (Mikirpunji)	95	78.21%	1021	0.0%	0.0%	270185
Tilka Compani (Tilka Company)	219	74.47%	795	98.63%	0.46%	270186
Abompunjee (Abompunji)	191	68.06%	1122	0.0%	0.52%	270187
Babukhal	118	69.61%	815	0.0%	0.0%	270156
Bakhal (with Ningthembam and Nungchappi)	502	82.74%	1057	0.6%	0.0%	270169
Boroikhal	44	64.29%	833	0.0%	0.0%	270158
Hilghat	2286	84.59%	1058	0.0%	4.24%	270153
Jirimukh (Somapunji)	396	94.81%	904	0.0%	99.49%	270188
Sabughat	44	90.62%	571	0.0%	0.0%	270157

The following villages were not present in the 2011 census directory:

- Babupura
- Khedagar
- Latingkhal Makha
- Leingangpokpi
- Mongbung
- Muolzawl (Monjol)
- Kalinagar

== Borobekra subdivision ==
Name	Population	Effective literacy rate	Sex ratio	SC population %	ST population %	Census code (2011)
Bhomikpara (Bhumikpara)	822	63.1%	1035	9.12%	0.12%	270196
Bhutangkhal	1046	83.47%	898	44.26%	50.0%	270191
Borobekra	741	83.18%	1154	2.02%	27.26%	270193
Chotobekra	1345	73.96%	1026	18.14%	58.29%	270189
Choudhurikhal (Chowdhurikhal)	136	99.15%	659	0.0%	100.0%	270203
Durgapur (Lamdai Khunou)	434	89.7%	1038	45.16%	0.0%	270200
Guakhal (Gaokhal)	824	85.55%	995	1.09%	0.73%	270194
Harinagar	421	65.03%	986	82.66%	1.19%	270195
Jakuradhor Part I	1486	76.27%	945	88.29%	1.75%	270197
Jakuradhor Part II	1171	79.57%	1012	32.88%	18.27%	270198
Jatrapur	715	56.96%	1031	0.0%	0.42%	270192
Lama Bhutangkhal (Lamabhutangkhal)	171	52.98%	781	89.47%	3.51%	270190
Madhupur (Modhupur)	156	42.75%	814	51.92%	3.21%	270202
Narainpur (Narayanpur)	464	69.53%	902	49.78%	34.27%	270201
Tupidhor	180	70.07%	765	76.67%	0.0%	270199

The following village was not present in the 2011 census directory: Gotaikhal.

=== Other villages ===
In the 2011 census directory, the following villages were part of the Jiribam subdivision of the Imphal East district, but are not listed on the Jiribam district website as of 2024:

Name	Population	Effective literacy rate	Sex ratio	SC population %	ST population %	Census code (2011)
Makhabosti	575	74.09%	962	71.65%	15.65%	270184
Narandhor Basa	294	73.6%	1042	0.0%	13.95%	270155
