= Leishabithol =

Village in Manipur, India

- Interactive map of Leishabithol
- Location in Manipur, India Leishabithol (India)
- Coordinates: 24°44′35″N 93°09′23″E
- Country: India
- State: Manipur
- District: Jiribam

Area
  - Total: 172.4 km^{2} (66.6 sq mi)
- Elevation: 61 m (200 ft)

Population (2011)
  - Total: 231

Language(s)
  - Official: Meitei
- Time zone: UTC+5:30 (IST)

Leishabithol (Note: Alternative spellings: "Leisabithol", "Laishabithol" and "Laishabithal", and "Leisabithel".) is a census village in Jiribam district, Manipur, India. It is along the low-lying ridges of the Vangaitang range, close to the Vangaichungpao railway station. Also close-by are the villages of Mullargao (Note: Alternative spellings: "Mullargaon", and "Mulargaon".) and Nungkhal.

== Geography and history ==
The Vangaitang range to the east of the Jiribam district is traditionally inhabited by the Kuki-Zo tribes, in particular the Hmars. The tribals in the northern part of the range are predominantly Thadou Kukis (often called just "Kukis"). In 1907, the Jiribam plain was opened for settlement by the Government of Manipur, and it came to be settled by Meiteis and Bengali speakers from the neighbouring Cachar district.

The Jiribam plain roughly ends at Uchathol, to the east of which lie the foothills of the Vangaitang range. The "foothills" in this region are made up of multiple strands of long, parallel ridges, interspersed by equally long valleys. These valleys are inhabited and cultivated. The first valley contains the Mullargao village, occupying the entire length of the valley. The second valley partly houses the Leishabithol village, but the main settlement of Leishabithol is along a break in the ridgeline where a river flows down from the top of the Vangaitang range. Nungkhal is also in the second valley to the south of Leishabithol.

The third valley and the ones above it belong to the Tamenglong district and are lightly populated. The fourth valley has the Vangaichungpao railway station on the Katakhal–Jiribam–Imphal line. The nearest large village to the railway station is Leishabithol. During the construction of the railway, the construction companies were based at Leishabithol. There was also a camp of 4th Manipur Rifles stationed there for security. In 2018, it was reported that 5th Manipur Rifles were deployed at the train station.

Between Uchathol and Mullargao, there are tribal villages such as Phaitol, Kamarangkha Khasi and Ngahmunphai, which are administratively in Tamenglong district. Mullargao and Leishabithol are however in Jiribam district. The overlapping jurisdictions of districts makes it difficult to draw clear district boundaries. In August 2024, the Tousem Area Students' Organization noted that nine villages of Tamenglong district had been wrongly shown as part of Jiribam district in government-sponsored maps.

The "Mullargao Road" from Uchathol leads to these villages. There is also a road from Kashmipur, which goes further up to the village of Kulbung. The "Kashimpur Road" below the foothills pass through Jarolpokpi and Uchathol, and joins the National Highway 37 near Gularthol.

== Demographics ==
The Leishabithol census village has a population of 231 people living in 51 households. Three households are said to belong to Meitei people. Thirty-one people (13 percent) belong to Scheduled Tribes. They appear to live in a separate settlement called "Leishabithol Kuki".

The neighbouring Mullargao village has 836 people living in 158 households. Nungkhal has 318 people living in 64 households. These villages have no Scheduled Tribes.

== 2023–2025 Manipur violence ==
On 3 May 2023, major ethnic violence broke out between the Meitei and Kuki-Zo communities of Manipur. Within weeks over 100 people died and 60,000 people got displaced. All the Kuki-Zo people in the Imphal Valley and the Meitei people in the Kuki-Zo-dominated hill districts were forced to flee to the other side. The Jiribam district, consisting of both the classes of population but also other communities such as Bengalis, was affected in a unique fashion.

During the first week of violence, the security forces quickly controlled the violence in Jiribam district and brokered a peace agreement between the communities. The peace agreement held for almost a year, with no deaths being caused.

The peace was shattered by twin murders in May–June 2024. The first was of a Kuki individual named Seigoulen Singson from Phaitol. He went missing on 14 May, and his body was discovered floating in Jiri River three days later near Muolzawl. A second death occurred on 6 June, that of a Meitei individual named Soibam Saratkumar Singh from Hilghat area (Note: His residence was mentioned as Sorok Atingbi Khunou, a locality in the Hilghat area.) who went missing while returning from his farm near Leishabithol. His two-wheeler and slippers were found near the CRPF camp in Uchathol, the likely place of his abduction, and the body was found near Mullargao. Within an hour rumours spread on social media that his body was found beheaded, and in another hour, widespread arson broke out in Jiribam as Meitei mobs started attacking Kuki-Zo settlements and churches.

According to the Kuki Inpi of the region, all Kuki-Zo settlements in the Jiribam town, including in Uchathol, were attacked simultaneously and burnt down. In the ensuing mayhem, over a thousand Kuki-Zo people, mainly Hmars and Thadou Kukis, from Jiribam fled to Assam's Cachar district. Meitei families from Leishabithol were also evacuated since the area is dominated by Kuki tribes. According to The Sangai Express, there were only three Meitei families in Leishabithol, and their houses were burnt down after they were evacuated.
