= Borobekra =

Village in Manipur, India

Borobekra Barabekra
- Village
- Location in Manipur, India Borobekra (India)
- Coordinates: 24.6329°N 93.0963°E
- Country: India
- State: Manipur
- District: Jiribam

Area
  - Total: 114.8 km^{2} (44.3 sq mi)

Population (2011)
  - Total: 741
  - Density: 6.45/km^{2} (16.7/sq mi)

Language(s)
  - Official: Meitei
- Time zone: UTC+5:30 (IST)
- Vehicle registration: MN
- Website: manipur.gov.in

Borobekra, also spelt Barabekra, is a village in the Jiribam district in Manipur, India, and the headquarters of an eponymous subdivision. It is about 30 km south of Jiribam, the headquarters of the district. The village is on the bank of the Barak River, near the confluence of a tributary that flows down from the Vangaitang range to the east. The Barak River flows north in this region, up to Jirimukh, where it turns northwest. The Barak River also forms the border with the Assam state of India.

The villages surrounding Borobekra include Guakhal, (Note: Alternative spellings: "Gwakhal", "Guwakhal".) Harinagar and Jakuradhor. (Note: Alternative spellings: "Jakurador", "Jakuradhar" and "Jakhradawr".) All of them are broadly considered as part of the Borobekra region. The Borobekra Police Station is at Jukuradhor. The north–south-running Jiribam–Tipaimukh highway passes through the Guakhal village, close to Borobekra, and continues on to Harinagar and Jakuradhor.

== Geography and History ==
The Borobekra Subdivision consists of the southern half of the Jiribam district, which itself lies between the western great bend of the Barak River (Note: The Barak River flows south till Tipaimukh and then makes an almost 180°-bend to flow north till Jirimukh.) in the west and the Vangaitang range in the east. The district was added to Manipur by the British in 1832, transferring it from the newly annexed Cachar kingdom. The forested "Jiribam valley" was opened for agricultural settlement in 1907. Most of the settlers came from Cachar, including Bengalis as well as Meiteis. Rice and sugarcane were cultivated, and betel leaf (pan) in areas unsuitable for rice cultivation.

Borobekra and its surrounding villages (Guakhal, Harinagar and Jakuradhor) were likely settled during that time, or at any rate well before Indian independence, mostly by Bengali speakers. Borobekra, with a marina on the Barak River, developed into a key market town for the area. It ran a Friday market, serving all the people living on the banks of the Barak River, as far way as Pherzawl. (Note: Pherzawl itself is not on the bank of the Barak River, but it could access the river through a port called Taithu-ghat nearby.)

The Vangaitang range is the traditional abode of the Hmar tribes (part of the Kuki-Zo conglomeration). The Hmars live in small settlements at the foothills and at the edges of forest areas.

=== Independent India ===
After Manipur was merged into India, a Jiribam Subdivision was formed, encompassing the Jiribam valley as well as the Vangaitang range extending till Tipaimukh in the south. In due course, the southern and eastern hill regions were transferred to the hill district (originally Churachandpur, now Pherzawl), leaving only the valley and some of the foothills areas in the Jiribam subdivision. The foothill villages to the east of Borobekra, such as Phailian, Tuisen and Buangmun, populated by Hmar tribals, were also transferred to the administration of the hill district.

The Jiribam subdivision became part of the Imphal East district, and was divided into two revenue circles: the Jiri Circle in the north, and Barak Circle (or Borobekra Circle) in the south. The Barak Circle was headquartered at Borobekra. In December 2016, the Jiribam subdivision was made an independent district, and the revenue circles were upgraded to subdivisions.

A police station for the Borobekra region was approved in 2011, and was eventually inaugurated in 2016. It is in the Jakuradhor village, within a compound that also contains a camp of the Central Reserve Police Force (CRPF). There is also an Assam Rifles camp at Guakhal.

=== Insurgencies ===
According to multiple sources, the proscribed Meitei insurgent groups, United National Liberation Front (UNLF) and People's Liberation Army of Manipur (PLA), used the Jiribam valley and the neighbouring Cachar district of Assam as their main area of operations. The region was originally used by the groups in the 1960s as a launching pad to access East Pakistan (present-day Bangladesh), where training camps were run by Inter-Services Intelligence (ISI). With the liberation of Bangladesh in 1971, this activity was briefly halted, but it resumed in 1975 with the advent of military rule in Bangladesh.

Security expert E. M. Rammohan states that the hilly region bounded by NH-37 (Note: NH-37 was earlier calleld National Highway 53.) in the north, Thangjing Hills in the east, Tipaimukh Road in the south, and the Jiribam–Tipaimukh Road on the west, was a "free zone", with minimal presence of security forces, which was adopted by UNLF, PLA and Hmar People's Convention–Democracy for setting up camps and bases. The PLA and UNLF are said to have entered this area after the Kuki-Naga conflict (in the 1990s) by helping resettle the displaced Kukis in Churachandpur district and obtaining land in return. Rammohan also states that HPC-Democracy was allied with UNLF.

In the 1990s, UNLF is said to have forcibly driven out many Bengali residents of Borobekra, settling Meiteis in their place. The Bengalis that remained were subject to violence and extortion.

The entente between UNLF and the Hmar community came to an end in 2006 after the mass rape of 21 women and girls allegedly carried out by the UNLF and the allied group Kangleipak Communist Party (KCP) in the neighbouring Tipaimukh subdivision. Afterwards, the Meitei insurgent groups were forced to leave the Jiribam and Tipaimukh areas. The local people credited the 7th India Reserve Battalion (IRB) forces stationed at Jakuradhor, and the 37th battalion of Assam Rifles stationed at Guakhal, for re-establishing peace in the region.

== Demography ==
The Borobekra census village has a population of 741 people as per the 2011 census, of which 27% is made of Scheduled Tribes (Kuki-Zo people). The other major communities in the region are Bengalis and Meiteis. Bishnupriya Manipuris are also known to live in Borobekra.

The villages Guakhal (population: 824), Harinagar (population: 421), and Jakuradhor–Part 1 (population: 1486) have only small fractions of Scheduled Tribe populations. But Jakuradhor–Part 2 (population: 1171) has 18 percent Scheduled Tribes.

== 2023–2026 Manipur conflict ==
=== Summer 2024 ===
When the ethnic conflict in Manipur erupted between the Meiteis and Kuki-Zo people on 3 May 2023, the Jiribam district remained relatively at peace for almost a year. The peace was shattered by twin murders in May–June 2024, the first of a Kuki individual named Seigoulen Singson in May, and the second of a Meitei individual named Soibam Saratkumar Singh in June. Rumours spread that Saratkumar's body was founded beheaded, inflaming Meitei feelings. Meitei mobs led by Arambai Tenggol started torching houses in the Jiribam area, prompting the Hmars and Thadou Kukis to flee to relief camps in neighbouring Assam.

This invited retaliation by Hmars and Thadou Kukis in the Borobekra subdivision in the south. On 8 June, armed tribals (referred to as "suspected militants" in the media) set fire to a police outpost at Chotobekra and continued by torching several houses. The district authorities evacuated 239 Meitei people from their villages and to a shelter in the sports complex in Jiribam. Some Meiteis who felt vulnerable also took shelter in the Borobekra police station at Jakuradhor. They said that, soon after they left, their houses were torched.

=== November 2024 ===
On 1 August, the Jiribam district administration brokered a peace agreement between Meiteis and Hmars in order to facilitate the return of displaced residents. The agreement was disowned by Hmar Inpui. Nevertheless, on 7 August, the residents of the Mongbung Meitei village were escorted back to their homes. In early October, the Hmar villagers of Zairawn felt safe enough to return to their village.

The Zairawn village was attacked on 7 November, allegedly by members of the Arambai Tenggol militia joined by the Pambei faction of UNLF which had signed a peace agreement with the government the previous November. The villagers were chased out and some 17 houses were burnt down. A 31-year-old school teacher, a mother of three, was captured, brutally tortured, and burnt alive along with her house. The grisly killing of the woman sent shock waves through the Kuki-Zo community, and initiated a spiral of violence in various parts of th state resulting in at least 21 deaths. The worst of these incidents was near Borobekra.

On 11 November, roughly two dozen Hmar armed men arrived at Jakuradhor Karong on the Jiribam–Tipaimukh Road, perhaps some in shared auto rickshaws and others via the river. They asked the Meitei people of the locality to leave their properties and then started burning them down. Journalist Greeshma Kuthar points out that this was allowed to happen despite the presence of CRPF personnel. After about fifteen minutes, CRPF personnel reportedly asked the Hmar men to leave. According to Hmar Inpuri, a CRPF bullet-proof vehicle arrived on the scene soon afterwards, and opened indiscriminate fire. Ten of the Hmar armed men were killed. (Hmar Inpui claimed that three of them were captured by CRPF and beaten to death.)

The Manipur Police however released a statement saying that the Hmar men attacked the police station cum CRPF camp to the south, and that the deaths of the 10 Hmar men occurred in retaliatory fire from the CRPF. They said that one of the CRPF men was also injured and was being treated in a hospital.

The remaining Hmars in the group, who fled the scene, allegedly abducted a family of six, an elderly Meitei woman, along with her two daughters and three grandchildren. All six people were subsequently killed, and their bodies were recovered from the Jiri and Barak rivers a few days later, some showing marks of torture.

The killing of women and children led to widespread protests by the Meitei population of the Imphal Valley, inviting curfews and Internet shutdowns. The central government also declared Jiribam a "disturbed area" under the Armed Forces (Special Powers) Act, and sent 70 additional companies of central armed police forces to maintain law and order.

The National Investigation Agency was given charge of investigating the killings.
