= Jiribam district =

District of Manipur

- District of Manipur
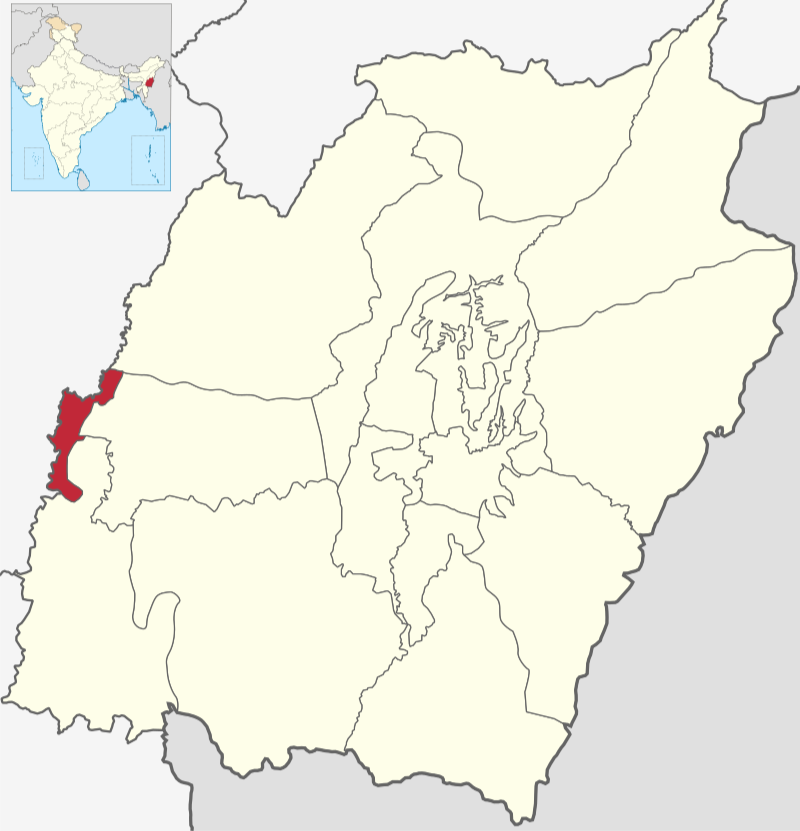
- Location in Manipur
- Interactive map of Jiribam district
- Coordinates (Jiribam): 24.810°N 93.114°E
- Country: India
- State: Manipur
- Established: 2016
- Headquarters: Jiribam

Area
  - Total: 212 km^{2} (82 sq mi)
  - Rank: 15

Population (2011)
  - Total: 43,838
  - Density: 207/km^{2} (536/sq mi)

Language(s)
  - Official: Meitei (officially called Manipuri)
  - Spoken: Bengali • Hmar • Other tribal languages
- Time zone: UTC+05:30 (IST)
- Major highways: NH-37
- Website: https://jiribam.nic.in/

Jiribam district (Meitei pronunciation: /jee-ree-baam/) is a district at the western periphery state of Manipur, India. It borders the Cachar district of Assam on the west, and serves as the western gateway for Manipur. Formerly a subdivision of the Imphal East district, it was made an independent district in December 2016.

== Geography and history ==
Jiribam district lies in the valley between the Bhuban range on the west (in Assam's Cachar district) and the Vangai range ("Vangaitang") in the east. The Barak River flows due north in the valley from Tipaimukh, turning west near Jirimukh, about 10 km south of Jiribam. Also at Jirimukh, the Jiri River that flows from north in the same valley drains into the Barak River.

The area of Jiribam district appears to have been part of the Cachar kingdom at the beginning of the 19th century. After annexing the kingdom in 1832, the British made an agreement with Raja Gambhir Singh of Manipur ceding all claims to the territory bounded in the west by the western stretch of Barak River (Note: The Barak River flows south till Tipaimukh and then makes an almost 180°-bend to flow north till Jirimukh. The region between these two stretches might have been contested between Manipur and Kachar prior to 1833.) and the Jiri River. Consequently, the eastern portion of the Jiribam valley came under the control of Manipur, while the rest remained under Cachar which became part of Assam.

The Jiribam Valley was at that time forested and mostly uninhabited. The Cachar portion of the valley had a ferry port at Jirighat, which was used by the travellers on the Silchar–Manipur road (called "Cachar Road" in Manipur). The Manipur state government decided to open the Jiribam valley for agricultural settlement in 1907, and by 1911, 14,346 bighas of land is said to have been settled. Rice and sugarcane were cultivated, and betel leaf (pan) in areas unsuitable for rice cultivation.

By 1931, there were 46 villages in the Jiribam settlement, populated by Manipuri (Meitei) Hindus and Muslims, Bengali Hindus and Muslims, a few Kukis and Kabuis. Jiribam also had 5 primary schools, the same number as in the Imphal Valley outside the city of Imphal. Most of the settlers in Jiribam came from the Cachar district, very few from the Imphal Valley (Manipur valley). This meant that the settlers had to be treated as 'British subjects' rather than 'Manipur state subjects' and revenue settlement orders and dispute resolutions had to be carried out by the British Political Agent.

=== Independent India ===
After the independence of India, Manipur elected a legislative assembly under its own constitution. Ten seats in the assembly were allocated to the hill areas, which included Jiribam. Soon afterwards, Manipur merged into India and was governed under the Constitution of India as a union territory. (Note: In 1950, it was termed a Part 'C' state, later changed to 'union territory' in 1956.) The territory of Manipur was divided into 8 subdivisions, one of which was based at Jiribam. The Jiribam subdivision covered the Vangai range, and stretched up to Tipaimukh in the south. It was designated as a hill subdivision.

In 1969, when Manipur was divided into five districts, the southern part of the Jiribam subdivision was separated into the Tipaimukh subdivision of the 'Manipur South' district (now in Pherzawl district), and the remaining Jiribam subdivision was included in the 'Manipur Central' district headquartered at Imphal. This also meant that Jiribam became part of the valley area of Manipur, rather than hill area. To avoid the anomaly, the eastern part of the subdivision consisting of the Vangai range was transferred to the Tipaimukh subdivision in stages. With the reorganisation of 'Manipur Central', the subdivision got attached to the Imphal East district.

A movement for a separate revenue district for Jiribam took shape in 2006 and a Jiribam District Demand Committee (JDDC) was formed. During 2011, the committee conducted several strikes and economic blockades along NH-37, which passes through Jiribam. In November 2011, the state government agreed to the demands of JDDC and signed a memorandum of understanding. The government also agreed to upgrade the Borobekra Circle in the southern part of the region into a subdivision.

In 2016, Jiribam subdivision became an independent Jiribam district.

=== Insurgencies ===
According to multiple sources, the proscribed Meitei insurgent groups, United National Liberation Front (UNLF) and People's Liberation Army of Manipur (PLA), used the Jiribam valley and the neighbouring Cachar district of Assam as their main area of operations. The region was originally used by Meitei insurgent groups in the 1960s as a launching pad to access the training camps run by Inter-Services Intelligence (ISI) in East Pakistan (present-day Bangladesh). With the liberation of Bangladesh in 1971, this activity was briefly halted, but it resumed in 1975 with the advent of military rule in Bangladesh.

Security expert E. M. Rammohan states that the hilly region bounded by NH-37 (Note: NH-37 was earlier calleld National Highway 53.) in the north, Thangjing Hills in the east, Tipaimukh Road in the south, and the Jiribam–Tipaimukh Road on the west, was a "free zone", with minimal presence of security forces, which was adopted by UNLF, PLA and Hmar People's Convention–Democracy for setting up camps and bases. The PLA and UNLF are said to have entered this area after the Kuki-Naga conflict (in the 1990s) by helping resettle the displaced Kukis in Churachandpur district and obtaining land in return. Rammohan also states that HPC-Democracy was allied with UNLF.

The entente between UNLF and the Hmar community came to an end after the mass rape of 21 women and girls allegedly carried out by the UNLF and the allied group Kangleipak Communist Party (KCP) in the neighbouring Tipaimukh subdivision in 2006. Afterwards, the insurgent groups were forced to leave the area. The local people also credited the 7th India Reserve Battalion (IRB) forces stationed at Uchathol and Jakuradhor for establishing peace in Jiribam district.

== Demographics ==
Religions in Jiribam district (2011)
Religion	Percent
Hinduism	48.64%
Islam	34.07%
Christianity	13.34%
Other (Sanamahi or Heraka)	3.77%
Other or not stated	0.18%

At the time of the 2011 census, the district had a population of 42,838. Jiribam had a sex ratio of 945 females per 1000 males and a literacy rate of 63.11%. 16.75% of the population lived in urban areas. Scheduled Castes and Scheduled Tribes made up 16.94% and 12.52% of the population respectively.

Languages of Jiribam district (2011)
1. Bengali (50.8%)
2. Manipuri (30.5%)
3. Hmar (8.04%)
4. Bishnupuriya (2.66%)
5. Hindi (1.63%)
6. Kabui (1.46%)
7. Kuki (1.11%)
8. Others (3.80%)

At the time of the 2011 census, 50.79% of the population spoke Bengali, 30.51% Manipuri, 8.04% Hmar, 2.66% Bishnupuriya, 1.63% Hindi, 1.46% Kabui and 1.11% Kuki as their first language.

== Administrative divisions ==
Prior to 2017, when Jiribam was a subdivision in the Imphal East district, it was divided into two circles: Jiri Circle in the north, headquartered at Jiribam, and Barak Circle in the south, headquartered at Borobekra. After Jiribam became a district, the two circles have been upgraded to subdivisions: Jiribam Subdivision and Borobekra Subdivision.

The local administration in the Jiribam Subdivision is divided into the Jiribam municipality and three gram panchayats (village councils) based at Hilghat, Dibong and Sonapur. The local administration in the Borobekra Subdivision has three gram panchayats: Latingkhal, Borobekra and Jakuradhor.

Jiribam district as a whole forms one legislative assembly constituency.

== 2023–2024 Manipur violence ==
On 3 May 2023, major ethnic violence broke out between the Meitei and Kuki-Zo communities of Manipur. Within weeks over 100 people died and 60,000 people got displaced. All the Kuki-Zo people in the Imphal Valley and the Meitei people in the Kuki-Zo-dominated hill districts were forced to flee to the other side. The Jiribam district, consisting of both the classes of population but also other communities such as Bengalis, was affected in a unique fashion.

During the first week of violence, Meitei mobs led by the Arambai Tenggol militia attacked Kuki-Zo localities in the Jiribam Town. The security forces quickly controlled the violence and brokered a peace agreement between the communities. This agreement held for almost a year. Even though there were sporadic incidents such as house burning and abduction, there were no deaths.

The peace was shattered by twin murders in May–June 2024, the first of a Kuki individual named Seigoulen Singson in May, and the second of a Meitei individual named Soibam Saratkumar Singh in June. Rumours spread that Saratkumar's body was founded beheaded, inflaming Meitei feelings. Meitei mobs led by Arambai Tenggol started torching houses in the Jiribam area, inviting retaliation from Kuki mobs. In the ensuing mayhem, the entire population of Hmars and Thadou Kukis from the Jiribam town got displaced to Assam's Cachar district. A Hmar village called Hmarkhawlien near Lakhipur became their refuge. The Meiteis in the tribal parts of the district fled to relief camps in and around the Jiribam town.

The Kuki-Zo villages in the southern hills of the district got cut off from the Jiribam town, which was now under the control of hostile Meitei mobs and militias. In order to obtain supplies, they had to use the river route, the Jiri River and then the Barak River, leading to Hmarkhawlien. The villagers pooled money and stocked up on supplies. The Indigenous Tribes Advocacy Committee (ITAC) asked the government to prevent Arambai Tenggol and Meitei extremists from entering the tribal villages and requested special protection to the villages of Zairawn, Mongbung, Phaitol, Muolzawl and Sejang.

== See also ==
- List of populated places in Jiribam district

== Bibliography ==
- Census of India, Manipur, Part II (PDF), 1972
- Manipur Administrative Atlas (PDF), Census of India, Government of India, 2005
- Allen, B. C.; Gait, E. A.; Allen, C. G. H.; Howard, H. F. (1979) [1857], Gazetteer of Bengal and North-East India, Delhi: Mittal Publications – via archive.org
- Chadha, Vivek (2005), Low Intensity Conflicts in India: An Analysis, SAGE, ISBN 978-0-7619-3325-0 – via archive.org
- Dar, Maloy Krishna (2006), Fulcrum of Evil: ISI, CIA, Al Qaeda Nexus, Delhi: Manas Publications, ISBN 81-7049-278-5 – via archive.org
- Harvey, C. W. L. (1932), Administration Report of The Manipur State For The Year 1931-32, Imphal: The State Printing Press – via archive.org
