= Phaitol =

Village in Manipur, India

Phaitol Pheitual
- Interactive map of Phaitol
- Location in Manipur, India Phaitol (India)
- Coordinates: 24°47′03″N 93°09′24″E
- Country: India
- State: Manipur
- District: Tamenglong/Jiribam

Population (2011)
  - Total: 971

Language(s)
  - Official: Meitei
  - Spoken: Thadou
- Time zone: UTC+5:30 (IST)

Phaitol (Note: Alternative spellings: "Phaitoul", and "Pheitual".) is a village in the Tamenglong district of Manipur, India, near its border with the Jiribam district. It is at the foothills of the Vangaitang range, close to the National Highway 37. Though the village is part of Tamenglong district, Tousem Subdivision, it is geographically located within the precincts of Jiribam district due to geographical anomalies in the district delineation.

During the 2023–2024 Manipur violence, Phaitol was the site of much violent activity, population displacement and trauma.

== Geography ==
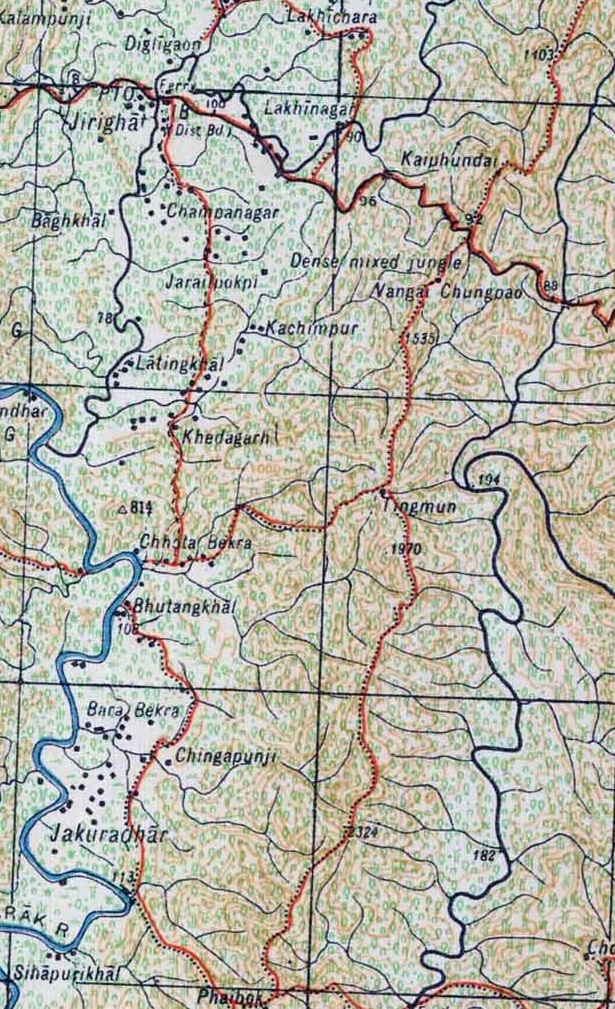
1944 Survey of India map of the Jiribam region: The location of Phaitol is in the "dense mixed jungle" to the north of Jarolpokpi, south of the east-west-running Cachar Road

The Vangaitang range to the east of the Jiribam district is traditionally inhabited by the Kuki-Zo tribes, mainly Hmars but also some Thadou Kukis. In 1907, the Jiribam plain was opened for settlement by the Government of Manipur, and it came to be settled by Meiteis and Bengali speakers from the neighbouring Cachar district.

The Jiribam plain roughly ends at the Uchathol village, to the east which lie the forested foothills of the Vangaitang range. A line of tribal villages stretch along the Cachar Road (now National Highway 37) in this region, with Phaitol being the first of them. Others are Gamphazol, Tatbung, (Note: Alternative spellings: "Tadbung".) Muktokhal (Muktokhong), Kaiphundai etc. These are tribal villages, populated mainly by Thadou Kukis (called just "Kukis" in this context). The Jiribam subdivision, originally regarded as a hill subdivision. spanned the entire Vangaitang range. In 1981, it was retagged as a valley district, and the villages on Vangaitang range were transferred to Tamenglong district.

To the south of Phaitol, there two further tribal villages: Kamarangkha Khasi, (Note: The main name has also been spelt as "Kamarang-Kha", "Kamarangha", "Kamaranga", "Kamranga" and "Karamkha". The suffix may also be written as "Khasia" and "Khasiya".) populated by Khasi settlers, and Ngahmunphai, which is a Kuki village. These two villages are also in Tamenglong district. However, villages to the east of these, such as Mullargao and Leishabithol, are in Jiribam district. These overlapping jurisdictions of districts makes it difficult to represent the district borders geographically.

The problem worsened when, in the 1990s, Jiribam district was extended to cover a portion of the northern stretch of the Jiri River. This resulted in nine villages of Tamenglong being shown as lying in the precincts of Jiribam district in geographical maps.

== Demographics ==
According to the 2011 census, Phaitol has a population of 971 people living in 189 households. Gamphazol has a population of 143 people. Tatbung and Muktokhal have populations of 268 people each. Almost all the population (99 percent) is made up of Scheduled Tribes, predominantly "Kukis" (Thadou Kukis).

The Kuki Inpi of Jiribam, Tamenglong and Noney (KIJTN) has its head office in Phaitol.

== 2023–2025 Manipur violence ==
On 3 May 2023, major ethnic violence broke out between the Meitei and Kuki-Zo communities of Manipur. Within weeks over 100 people died and 60,000 people got displaced. All the Kuki-Zo people in the Imphal Valley and the Meitei people in the Kuki-Zo-dominated hill districts were forced to flee to the other side. The Jiribam district, consisting of both the classes of population but also other communities such as Bengalis, was affected in a unique fashion.

During the first week of violence, Meitei mobs led by the Arambai Tenggol militia attacked Kuki-Zo localities in the Jiribam Town. The security forces quickly controlled the violence and brokered a peace agreement between the communities. Phaitol was at the forefront of these efforts. A meeting of Kuki-Zo people was held at Phaitol under the supervision of the Deputy Commissioner of Tamenglong. The peace agreement held for almost a year. Even though there were sporadic incidents such as house burning and abduction, there were no deaths.

The peace was shattered by twin murders in May–June 2024. The first was of a Kuki individual named Seigoulen Singson from Phaitol. He went missing on 14 May, and his body was discovered floating in Jiri River three days later near Muolzawl. A second death occurred on 6 June, that of a Meitei individual named Soibam Saratkumar Singh from Hilghat area. (Note: His residence was mentioned as Sorok Atingbi Khunou, a locality in the Hilghat area.) He went missing while returning from his farm. His two-wheeler and slippers were found near Uchathol, the likely place of his abduction, and the body was found near Mullargao. Within an hour rumours spread on social media that his body was found beheaded, and in another hour, widespread arson broke out in Jiribam as Meitei mobs started attacking Kuki-Zo settlements and churches.

In the ensuing mayhem, over a thousand Kuki-Zo people, mainly Hmars and Thadou Kukis, from Jiribam fled to Assam's Cachar district. A Hmar village called Hmarkhawlien near Lakhipur became their refuge.

On 10 June, the Chief Minister's Office revealed that it had flagged intelligence to the effect that "200 armed Kuki-Zo militants" from Churachandpur were moving to the Phaitol and Kaiphundai areas, and demanded an 'action taken report' from the Director General of Police (DGP). The newly elected MP for Inner Manipur, Bimol Akoijam questioned why the chief minister has not sacked the DGP. Journalist Greeshma Kuthar however revealed that it was the Meitei militants belonging to the Pambei faction of United National Liberation Front (UNLF) that had moved to Jiribam well before November 2023, when they signed a peace agreement with the state government. The peace agreement provided a cover for them to operate freely in the district. Following the eruption of the violence, Arambai Tenggol and UNLF-Pambei cadres patrolled the Meitei localities in and around the Jiribam town and the Kuki-Zo residents had to flee their homes.

On 13 June, the Kuki-Zo villagers imposed a blockade of NH-37 near the Tatbung village to protest the Jiribam violence. It was lifted for two days and reimposed again on 20 June, citing the reason that Meitei mobs were blockading medical and essential supplies to the Kuki-Zo villages. On that day, there were also allegations that the Kuki armed men set ablaze an empty narcotics checkpost and that the Manipur police commands and Meitei militants fired upon the Phaitol village indiscriminately. The blockade was lifted two days later after the central security forces signed a memorandum of understanding agreeing to the demands made by the blockading population.

In early July, hours before a scheduled visit of Rahul Gandhi to the area, the police reported gunfire from the Phaitol village towards Gularthol. They combed the village and arrested two individuals, including a juvenile, whom the villagers identified as "village volunteers". Kuki-Zo Village Volunteers of Vangailhang and Tuilangkuol condemned the action, and claimed that there was indiscriminate firing towards Phaitol from a Naka Check Point of Jiribam Police near the village. They demanded the removal of the Check Point. Kuki Inpi Manipur called a 12-hour shutdown to protest the arrests along with similar arrests in Kangpokpi district. Shortly after these events, unidentified miscreants torched the house of Seijathang Khongsai, the general secretary of KIJTN, in Phaitol.
