= Uchathol =

Village in Manipur, India

- Interactive map of Uchathol
- Location in Manipur, India Uchathol (India)
- Coordinates: 24°46′43″N 93°08′52″E
- Country: India
- State: Manipur
- District: Jiribam

Area
  - Total: 111.6 km^{2} (43.1 sq mi)

Population (2011)
  - Total: 1,180

Language(s)
  - Official: Meitei
- Time zone: UTC+5:30 (IST)

Uchathol is a census village in Jiribam district, Manipur, India. It is close to the National Highway 37, on Kashmirpur Road which branches off at Gularthol. The next village to its east which is in Tamenglong district. Being close to the tribal population, Uchathol played a seminal role during the 2023–2024 Manipur violence.

== Geography ==
The Vangaitang range to the east of the Jiribam district is traditionally inhabited by the Kuki-Zo tribes, in particular the Hmars. The tribals in the northern part of the range are predominantly Thadou Kukis (often called just "Kukis"). In 1907, the Jiribam plain was opened for settlement by the Government of Manipur, and it came to be settled by Meiteis and Bengali speakers from the neighbouring Cachar district.

The Jiribam plain roughly ends at Uchathol, to the east of which lie the foothills of the Vangaitang range. The "foothills" in this region are made up of multiple strands of long, parallel ridges, interspersed by equally long valleys. These valleys are inhabited and cultivated, containing villages such as Mullargao and Leishabithol. These villages are in Jiribam district. The "Mullargao Road" from Uchathol leads to these villages.

Between Uchathol and Mullargao, there are tribal villages such as Phaitol, Kamarangkha Khasi and Ngahmunphai, which are administratively in Tamenglong district. The overlapping jurisdictions of districts makes it difficult to draw clear district boundaries. In August 2024, the Tousem Area Students' Organization noted that nine villages of Tamenglong district had been wrongly shown as part of Jiribam district in government-sponsored maps.

Uchathol is connected to National Highway 37 via the Kashimpur Road, which meets the highway at a village called Gularthol. Towards the south, the road leads to Jarolpokpi and Kashmipur.

The 7th India Reserve Battalion (IRB) of Manipur is stationed at Uchathol. The 87th Battalion of Central Reserve Police Force (CRPF) also has a headquarters near Uchathol (closer to Ngahmunphai).

== Demographics ==
The Uchathol census village has a population of 1180 people living in 129 households. Twenty-one people (2 percent) belong to Scheduled Tribes.

== 2023–2025 Manipur violence ==
On 3 May 2023, major ethnic violence broke out between the Meitei and Kuki-Zo communities of Manipur. Within weeks over 100 people died and 60,000 people got displaced. All the Kuki-Zo people in the Imphal Valley and the Meitei people in the Kuki-Zo-dominated hill districts were forced to flee to the other side. The Jiribam district, consisting of both the classes of population but also other communities such as Bengalis, was affected in a unique fashion.

During the first week of violence, Meitei mobs led by the Arambai Tenggol militia attacked Kuki-Zo localities in the Jiribam Town. The security forces quickly controlled the violence and brokered a peace agreement between the communities. Phaitol was at the forefront of these efforts as a meeting of Kuki-Zo people at the village was addressed the deputy commissioner of Tamenglong. The peace agreement held for almost a year. Even though there were sporadic incidents such as house burning and abduction, there were no deaths.

The peace was shattered by twin murders in May–June 2024. The first was of a Kuki individual named Seigoulen Singson from Phaitol. He went missing on 14 May, and his body was discovered floating in Jiri River three days later near Muolzawl. A second death occurred on 6 June, that of a Meitei individual named Soibam Saratkumar Singh from Hilghat area (Note: His residence was mentioned as Sorok Atingbi Khunou, a locality in the Hilghat area.) who went missing while returning from his farm. His two-wheeler and slippers were found near the CRPF camp in Uchathol, the likely place of his abduction, and the body was found near Mullargao. Within an hour rumours spread on social media that his body was found beheaded, and in another hour, widespread arson broke out in Jiribam as Meitei mobs started attacking Kuki-Zo settlements and churches.

According to the Kuki Inpi of the region, all Kuki-Zo settlements in the Jiribam town, including in Uchathol, were attacked simultaneously and burnt down. In the ensuing mayhem, over a thousand Kuki-Zo people, mainly Hmars and Thadou Kukis, from Jiribam fled to Assam's Cachar district. A Hmar village called Hmarkhawlien near Lakhipur became their refuge.

On 13 June, the Kuki-Zo villagers imposed a blockade of NH-37 near the Tatbung village to protest the Jiribam violence. It was lifted for two days and reimposed again on 20 June, citing the reason that Meitei mobs were blockading medical and essential supplies to the Kuki-Zo villages. On that day, there were also allegations that the Kuki armed men set ablaze an empty narcotics checkpost and that the Manipur police commands and Meitei militants fired upon the Phaitol village indiscriminately. The blockade was lifted two days later after the central security forces signed a memorandum of understanding agreeing to the demands made by the blockading population.
