= Kaiphundai =

Village in Manipur, India

- Interactive map of Kaiphundai
- Location in Manipur, India Kaiphundai (India)
- Coordinates: 24°47′23″N 93°13′25″E
- Country: India
- State: Manipur
- District: Tamenglong
- Elevation: 330 m (1,080 ft)

Population (2011)
  - Total: 626

Language(s)
  - Official: Meitei
  - Spoken: Thadou
- Time zone: UTC+5:30 (IST)

Kaiphundai, also called New Kaiphundai or "Kaiphundai Naga", is a village in Tamenglong district, Manipur, India, close to its border with Jiribam district. The village is on top of the Vangaitang range, at an elevation of 330 m (1,080 ft). An older village that is now referred to as Old Kaiphundai or "Kaiphundai Kuki" is at a lower elevation of 236 m (774 ft) on the same range. Both the villages are along the National Highway 37 (Silchar–Imphal Highway) and are part of the 'Tamenglong West' subdivision (also called Tousem subdivision).

== Geography and history ==
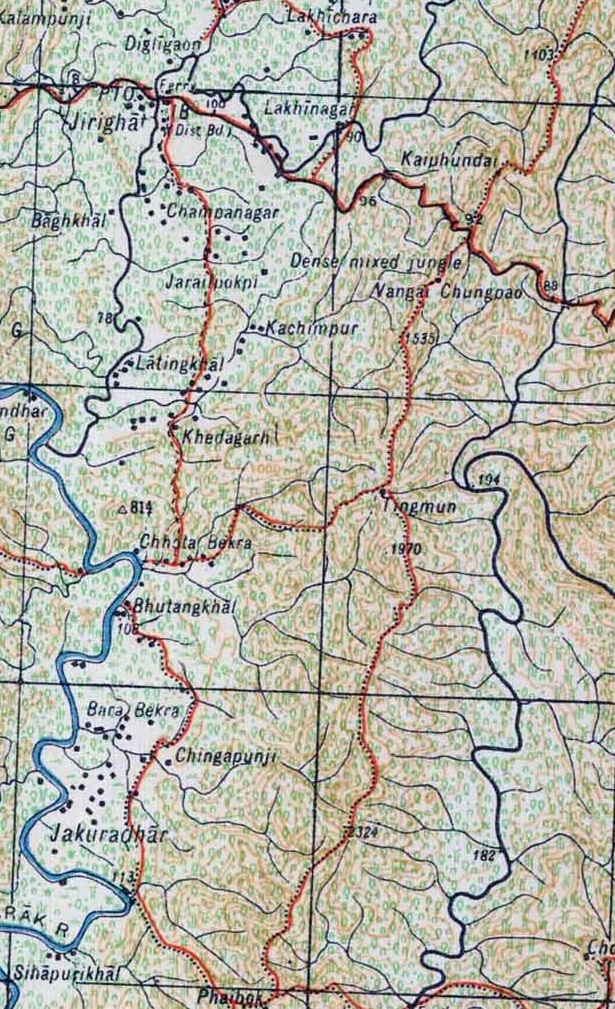
1944 Survey of India map of the Jiribam region and the adjacent Vangaitang range. The village marked "Kaiphundai" on Silchar–Manipur highway is now called Old Kaiphundai.

The Vangaitang range to the east of the Jiribam district is traditionally inhabited by the Kuki-Zo tribes, mainly Hmars but also some Thadou Kukis. In 1907, the Jiribam plain was opened for settlement by the Government of Manipur, and it came to be settled by Meiteis and Bengali speakers from the neighbouring Cachar district.

National Highway 37, which used to be known as the "Cachar Road" or the "Kala Naga route" during the British Raj, runs close to the Jiri River through the Jiribam plain, and then crosses the Vangaitang and Kala Naga ranges starting from Phaitol. A line of tribal villages stretch along the road, with a village called "Kaiphundai" mid-way through the climb. (See survey map.) It is now called "Old Kaiphundai". A "New Kaiphundai" village was established at the top of the range after the present alignment of the National Highway was built. It came into being by 1971. (Note: In the 1971 census, Old Kaiphundai was in the Jiribam subdivision of the 'Manipur Central' district and New Kaiphundai was in the 'Manipur West' district.)

The Tamenglong district administration refers to the Old Kaiphundai village as "Kaiphundai Kuki" and the New Kaiphundai village as "Kaiphundai Naga", indicating the ethnicity of the respective inhabitants.

There has traditionally been a track or bridle path on the ridge line of the Vangaitang range. (See the 1944 map.) After the establishment of New Kaiphundai, a motorable road was laid between New Kaiphundai and Tousem, the subdivision headquarters of the 'Tamenglong West' subdivision (also called the Tousem subdivision). In 2007, there were demands from the local people for the improvement of the road, including the conduct of a shutdown of NH-37.

In the 1990s, Jiribam district was extended to cover a portion of the northern stretch of the Jiri River. This required a stretch of territory around NH-37 to be included in the Jiribam district. The current geographical maps show Jiribam district stretching up to New Kaiphundai and a portion of the Tousem Road. In 2024, the Tousem Area Students' Organisation has objected to the purported district border noting that nine villages of Tamenglong district, including the Kaiphundai villages, were being wrongly included in the Jiribam district.

== Demographics ==
According to the 2011 census, the New Kaiphundai village has a population of 370 people living in 77 households. Old Kaiphundai has a population of 227 people living in 50 households.
