= Vangaichungpao railway station =

Railway station in Tamenglong Dist, Manipur, India

Coordinates: 24.758°N 93.180°E

Vangaichungpao

General information
- Location: Vangaichungpao, Tamenglong district, Manipur; India
- Elevation: 521 metres (1,709 ft)
- System: Indian Railways station
- Owner: Indian Railways
- Operator: Northeast Frontier Railway
- Line: Katakhal–Jiribam–Imphal line
- Platforms: 1
- Tracks: 2

Construction
- Structure type: Standard (on-ground station)
- Parking: Yes
- Cycle facilities: No

Other information
- Status: Active
- Station code: VNGP
- Zone(s): Northeast Frontier Railway
- Division(s): Lumding

History
- Opened: Yes
Location

Vangaichungpao railway station is a newly commissioned railway station in Tamenglong district, Manipur. Its code is VNGP. It serve Vangaichunpao a village present in west Tamenglong sub-division of Tamenglong District. The station consists of two platforms. This station is directly connected to Jiribam, Silchar and Agartala. It is planned to extend it into Manipur.

The railway station was originally named "Dholakhal railway station", which was a misnomer. (Note: There is no village named Dholakhal in the vicinity of the station. The nearest Dholakhal village is in the Borobekra subdivision well to the south.) The Kuki Inpi of the region urged the Indian Railways to name it after Vangaichungpao as it is within the jurisdiction of that village. The main Vangaichungpao village is however at a higher elevation on the Vangaitang range. There is a smaller settlement near the railway station that has been called "Vangaichungpao Part II".

The nearest large village to the station is Leishabithol.
