= Jarolpokpi =

Village in Manipur, India

Jarolpokpi Zairawn
- Interactive map of Jarolpokpi
- Location in Manipur, India Jarolpokpi (India)
- Coordinates: 24.7562°N 93.14°E
- Country: India
- State: Manipur
- District: Jiribam

Area
  - Total: 2.47 km^{2} (0.95 sq mi)

Population (2011)
  - Total: 1,287

Language(s)
  - Official: Meitei
  - Spoken: Hmar, Thadou
- Time zone: UTC+5:30 (IST)

Jarolpokpi, (Note: Alternative spellings: "Jairolpokpi", "Jairalpokpi", "Jairelpokpi", and "Jaironpokpi".) also called Zairawn, (Note: Alternative spelling: "Zairon" and "Jairon".) is a census village at the southern end of the Jiribam plain in the Jiribam district, Manipur, India. It occupies a narrow plain between the Vangaitang range in the east and Sejang hills in the west, covering 2.47 km^{2} (0.95 sq mi) area. Included in the census village are a Hmar village Zairawn, two Thadou Kuki villages Mongbung (Note: Alternative spellings: "Mongbum", "Molbung", and "Mongbuang".) and Sejang Kuki, (Note: Alternative spellings: "Seijang", and "Sizang".) and a Meitei village Mongbung Meitei. The combined population of the Jarolpokpi census village is 1,237 people, of whom 64.2 percent are Scheduled Tribes.

== Geography ==
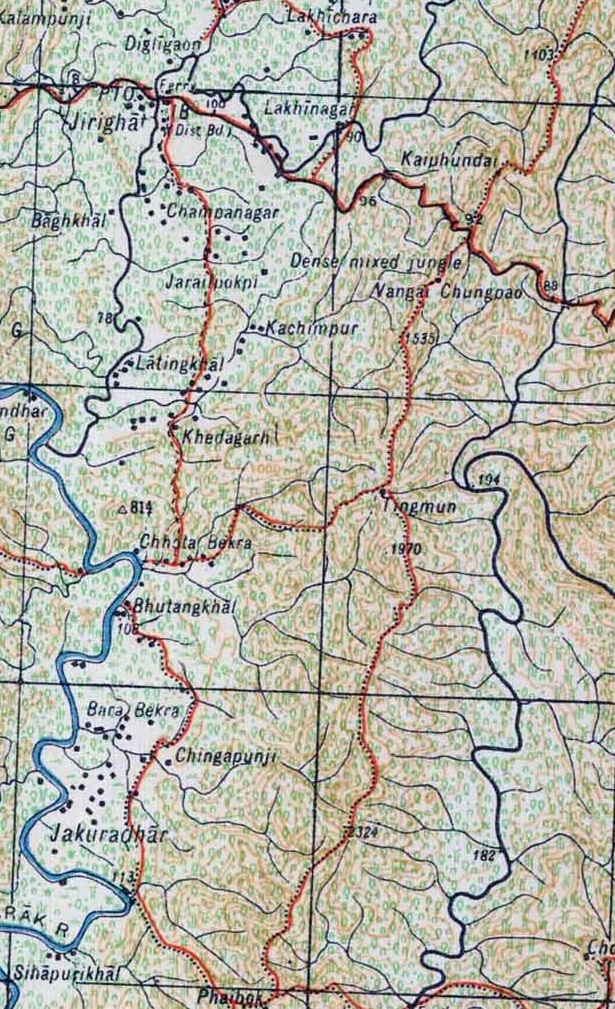
1944 Survey of India map of the Jiribam region: Jarolpokpi lies to the east of the highway from Jiribam to Chhota Bekra

Jarolpokpi or Zairawn is at the southeastern corner of the Jiribam plain, on the foothills of the Vangaitang range.The latter is traditionally inhabited by the Hmar tribes. In 1907, the Jiribam plain was opened for settlement by the Government of Manipur, and it came to be settled by Meiteis and Bengali speakers from the neighbouring Cachar district.

The Jiribam plain roughly ends at the Sejang (Kuki) village, to the south of which rise the low-lying "Sejang hills". These hills intervene between the Jiribam plain and the Jiri River valley to the west. Sejang Kuki and Mongbung are two Thadou Kuki villages at the northern edge of Sejang Hills.

Between Sejang Hills and the Vangaitang range to the east, runs a two kilometre-wide undulating plain which progressively narrows towards the south. Jarolpokpi, or Zairawn, lies in this plain. "Jarolpokpi" is the Meitei rendition of the original Hmar name, Zairawn.

Between Mongbung and Zairawn, there is a newer Meitei settlement called Mongbung Meitei, (Note: The Mongbung Meitei village is often referred to as simply "Mongbung" in news media, which causes considerable confusion. "Mongbung" is said to be Thadou Kuki name, and rightly belongs to the parent Kuki village.) on lands which are said to have been granted by the Kuki chief of Mongbung at some time in the past. It is apparently the only exclusively Meitei village in the area.

The Jiribam–Tipaimukh Road ("JT Road"), the main highway in the Jiribam district, runs north–south through the Sejang and Mongbung villages. It is the main transportation route for the Sejang area, connecting it to the district headquarters Jiribam. The southern part of the Jiribam district and Pherzawl district are accessible through the same road towards south. In addition, the Kashimpur Road runs at the foothills of the Vangaitang range, connecting Jarolpokpi to the NH37 near Uchathol and the village of Kashimpur to the south.

== History ==
During the 1950s Jarolpokpi and Mongbung were listed as hill villages. The 1971 census described Jarolpokpi as occupying 0.30 hectares and Mongbung 0.25 hectares. These areas likely represented only the residential areas of the villages. A considerable portion of the forested Sejang Hills area appears to have been under the control of the chiefs of Mongbung, Sejang and another village called Muolzawl (Note: Alternative spellings: "Molzol", "Moljol", and "Muljol") on the southwestern corner of Sejang Hills.

In 1981, the chief of Mongbung, Seikhothang Haokip, along with the chief of Muolzawl donated 600 acres of land to the Manipur Plantation Crop Corporation, under the Agriculture Department of Manipur, to raise a tea plantation. In return, their villagers were to receive job opportunities in the plantation. The tea estate is said to have functioned for 23 years producing good quality tea, but in 2004, it was wound up due to mismanagement. Having lost the employment on the tea estate, the villagers reverted to the traditional cultivation practices on the land. The chief of Mongbung sent a memorandum to the state chief minister stating that, the tea estate having failed, the land reverted to the original owner as per government rules.

In 2019, the state government under chief minister N. Biren Singh decided that the Jiri Tea Estate would be restarted as a public-private partnership, and sent eviction teams to evict the villagers. This led to an uproar among the villagers, and a court case. As of September 2021, the dispute was continuing.

== 2023–2025 Manipur violence ==
When the ethnic conflict in Manipur erupted between the Meiteis and Kuki-Zo people on 3 May 2023, the Jiribam district remained relatively peaceful for almost a year. The peace was shattered by twin murders in May–June 2024, the first of a Kuki individual named Seigoulen Singson in May, and the second of a Meitei individual named Soibam Saratkumar Singh in June. Rumours spread that Saratkumar's body was founded beheaded, inflaming Meitei feelings. Meitei mobs led by Arambai Tenggol started torching houses in the Jiribam area, inviting retaliation from Kuki mobs. In the ensuing mayhem, the entire population of Hmars and Thadou Kukis from the Jiribam town got displaced to Assam's Cachar district. The Meiteis in the tribal parts of the district, including those of the Mongbung Meitei village, fled to relief camps in Jiribam. The Hmars and Kukis fled to relief camps in neighbouring Assam, in particular the village of Hmarkhawlien near Lakhipur. The Hmar villagers of Zairawn also fled.

The Kuki-Zo villages in the southern hills of the district got cut off from the Jiribam town, which was now under the control of hostile Meitei mobs and militias. In order to obtain supplies, they had to use the river route, the Jiri River and then the Barak River, leading to Hmarkhawlien. The villagers pooled money and stocked up on supplies. The Indigenous Tribes Advocacy Committee (ITAC) asked the government to prevent Arambai Tenggol and Meitei extremists from entering the tribal villages and requested special protection to the villages of Zairawn, Mongbung, Phaitoul, Muolzawl and Sejang.

On 4 July 2024, the Meitei militia Arambai Tenggol and the Pambei faction of the United National Liberation Front (UNLF), attacked the Mongbung and Sejang villages. The Kukis returned fire leading to a prolonged gun battle. The next day, Manipur state commandos along with central security forces, conducted a combing operation in the Kuki villages, causing the Kukis to go into hiding. When they returned, they found all their stocks of rations soiled by the security forces. (Note: According to the Imphal Free Press, the combing operation was on Wednesday, 10 July.) The Kuki Inpi of the region has accused the security forces of using "uncivilised and inhumane" methods by destroying food stocks amidst a blockade.

On 13 July, there were reports of Kukis firing at the Mongbung Meitei village, which apparently had village volunteers and security forces deployed in it. On 14 July, Manipur commandos and CRPF personnel under the command of the chief Nectar Sanjenbam decided to raid the Kuki villages again. Disregarding the entreaties of the village secretary, the forces opened fire against the Kuki villagers, and in retaliatory fire, a CRPF jawan was killed and two other personnel got injured. Sanjenbam is said to have left after this, abandoning the operation. Assam Rifles forces had to step in to retrieve the body of the jawan and to bring the situation under control. The Kuki leaders issued a statement warning that they would no longer tolerate any kind of atrocities, be it from the Meitei government or central security agencies.

On 1 August, the Jiribam district administration claimed to have brokered a peace agreement between Meiteis and Hmars, leaving out Thadou Kukis, in order to facilitate the return of the displaced Meiteis and Hmars. The agreement was disowned by Hmar Inpui. Nevertheless, on 7 August, 135 residents of the Mongbung Meitei village, who had been staying at a relief camp in Jiribam, were escorted back to their homes. According to The Hindu, the security deployment was readjusted with a joint force of Assam Rifles and Central Reserve Police Force (CRPF) in both the Kuki-Zo and Meitei areas. However, The Indian Express noted that two companies of Manipur police commandos were also deployed. From then till 7 November, there were reportedly exchanges of fire between the Meitei and Kuki villages of Mongbung.

In early October, the villagers of Zairawn felt safe enough to return to their village. The school in the village reopened.

=== Attack on Zairawn ===
On 7 November, armed men suspected to be from the Imphal Valley, armed with advanced weaponry, attacked the Zairon village at around 9 pm. They came from the side of Mongbung. According to some sources, there was a gunfight that lasted about an hour. But the villagers said they had no weapons, or even village defence volunteers. They said 80 to 100 armed assailants, allegedly from the Meitei community along with the Arambai Tenggol militia, opened fire and set 17 homes ablaze. The villagers fled at the sound of gunfire. They said the assailants came in two groups, with one group opening fire and the other setting houses ablaze. The assailants also looted all the valuables from the houses before burning them. They spent two hours engaging in these activities.

In one house, the woman of the family, a 31-year-old school teacher and mother of three children, was shot in the leg and could not flee. She was captured, allegedly sexually assaulted, her body was dismembered and then burnt along with the house. These allegations, with the exception of sexual assault, were confirmed later by an autopsy conducted at the Silchar Medical College, which detailed further details of the brutal torture the woman had to endure before death.

The villagers said that a CRPF camp was only half-a-kilometre away from the village, and that the security forces used to patrol the village everyday. But on this occasion, they did not arrive. Imphal-based media printed disinformation sourced to the police, claiming that "Kuki militants" from Zairawn had attacked the Mongbung Meitei village. The Imphal Free Press also claimed that Zairawn (Jarolpokpi) had been "abandoned" after the unrest began, which was not corroborated by any other source. Soon after the event, the police denied any knowledge of any death in the attack.

The Kuki Inpi of the area issued a strong condemnation of the brutal killing of the woman, calling it a "barbaric act". It also accused the security forces of giving "tacit support" to the attackers. The attack on Zairawn and the grisly killing of the Hmar teacher initiated a spiral of violence in various parts of the state resulting in at least 21 deaths, state-wide protests by both Kuki-Zo and Meitei communities, and resolutions in the state cabinet and the ruling party legislators. Particularly affected was the Jakhuradhor area of southern Jiribam district. According to security officials, peace was shattered in the district and appeared hard to regain.
