= List of populated places in Tamenglong district =

Villages in Tamenglong district of Manipur, India

The Tamenglong district of Manipur state has 3 subdivisions. At the time of the 2011 Census of India, it included the present-day Noney district (split in 2016). 096 946 723

== Subdivisions ==
The Tamenglong district has 3 subdivisions:

- Tamenglong
- Tamei
- Tousem

== Towns ==
The Tamenglong district has one town:

Name	Type	Block	Population	Effective literacy rate	Sex ratio	SC population %	ST population %	Census code (2011)
Tamenglong	Census Town	Tamenglong	19363	86.95%	968	0.02%	96.07%	269207

== Villages ==
=== Tamenglong subdivision ===
The Tamenglong subdivision has following villages:

Name	Population	Effective literacy rate	Sex ratio	SC population %	ST population %	Census code (2011)
Akhui	729	75.79%	769	0.0%	86.42%	269176
Bhalok	1457	62.0%	1015	0.0%	99.86%	269200
Bamgaijang	565	73.58%	976	0.0%	98.76%	269178
Dailong	1634	66.37%	995	0.0%	98.9%	269201
Duigailong	733	60.83%	992	0.0%	99.59%	269173
Kahulong	721	77.67%	883	0.0%	99.17%	269177
Keikao	878	62.1%	982	0.0%	99.43%	269181
Khebuching	442	80.4%	913	0.0%	100.0%	269197
Khongjaron Khunkha	639	69.03%	902	0.0%	99.69%	269175
Khongjaron Khunthak	603	70.99%	1023	0.0%	100.0%	269174
L. Pabram	593	54.01%	964	0.0%	99.16%	269204
Ramlalong	159	97.12%	1065	0.0%	100.0%	269205
Sanglungpang	733	66.18%	1019	0.0%	100.0%	269180
Sempang	395	62.91%	936	0.0%	100.0%	269182
Sonpram	1112	60.22%	1037	0.0%	100.0%	269202
Tabanglong	302	25.2%	1013	0.0%	99.67%	269179
Tharon	1238	44.33%	943	0.0%	99.43%	269203
Wairangba	1676	68.93%	1079	0.0%	99.58%	269199

The following villages do not appear in the 2011 census directory:

- Khangchiulon
- Chiulon
- Kahulong
- Namkaolong
- Duilon
- Phalong
- Luangdi
- Puching
- Guangnam

=== Tamei subdivision ===
The Tamei subdivision has following villages:

Name	Population	Effective literacy rate	Sex ratio	SC population %	ST population %	Census code (2011)
Atang Khullen (Atangkhullen)	96	58.7%	1182	0.0%	100.0%	269169
Atang Khunou (Atangkhunou)	250	57.08%	812	0.0%	99.6%	269168
Chaton I	2015	81.92%	910	0.0%	100.0%	269158
Dikiuram	542	73.9%	863	0.0%	100.0%	269145
Dunong (Dunnong)	863	32.1%	836	0.0%	99.77%	269160
Elleng (Illeng)	1339	52.13%	860	0.0%	99.4%	269159
Kabonram (Kabuanram)	178	85.44%	874	0.0%	100.0%	269150
Kawalong	317	46.62%	1032	0.0%	98.42%	269154
Khundong Khunkhaiba (split into Khundong I and Khundong II)	755	66.56%	837	0.0%	99.6%	269171
Kuilong-I	1708	71.38%	917	0.0%	98.36%	269164
Konphung	739	77.6%	1041	0.0%	99.59%	269144
Lamlaba	757	38.6%	1013	0.0%	99.34%	269149
Langmei	971	77.9%	1040	0.0%	99.18%	269152
Langpram	619	74.19%	947	0.0%	99.84%	269146
Lasan	194	89.61%	764	0.0%	98.45%	269166
Lenglong	191	89.02%	802	0.0%	99.48%	269236
Makuinong	1300	43.89%	857	0.0%	99.15%	269161
Nallong	979	72.08%	982	0.0%	99.9%	269162
Nurathen	424	62.66%	820	0.0%	99.53%	269170
Old Kadi (Kadi I)	1925	81.37%	952	0.0%	99.17%	269165
Old Lemta (Lemta I)	1986	81.28%	872	0.0%	99.9%	269163
Old Thenjang	1044	57.58%	923	0.0%	99.81%	269167
Pallong	1037	82.29%	924	0.0%	99.42%	269148
Piulong	392	76.77%	970	0.0%	100.0%	269151
S. Songpibung	192	92.99%	1021	0.0%	100.0%	269172
Taipram	419	87.06%	1095	0.0%	99.05%	269147
Tamah	806	79.51%	1000	0.0%	99.88%	269155
Tamei (Tamei H/Q)	2728	92.94%	532	0.0%	69.39%	269153

The following villages are listed in the 2011 census directory, but do not appear on the district website as of 2023:

- Old Takou (population 1211): Instead, there are two villages called Lower Takou and Upper Takou
- New Kadi (population 451): Instead, there are villages named Kadi II, Kadi III, Kadi IV, and Kadi V

The following villages do not appear in the 2011 census directory:

- Nenluang
- Chaton II
- Kadi-II
- Kadi-III
- Kadi-IV
- Kadi-V
- Kuilong-II
- Kuilong-III
- Nheng
- Lower Takou
- Upper Takou
- New Lemta
- New Thenjang
- Sojamphai
- Tabam
- New Nallong
- Thiujaining
- LC Phai
- Lungmonphai

=== Tousem subdivision ===
The Tousem subdivision has following villages:

Name	Population	Effective literacy rate	Sex ratio	SC population %	ST population %	Census code (2011)
Aben	616	49.73%	987	0.0%	97.73%	269120
Atengba (Makoi)	936	66.92%	1030	0.0%	99.47%	269113
Azuram	902	80.37%	875	0.0%	93.57%	269106
Chingkao	570	43.06%	919	0.0%	23.33%	269110
Chingkhonglong	239	46.08%	1173	0.0%	99.16%	269111
Impa	907	54.97%	980	0.0%	99.89%	269101
Inem	481	34.64%	963	0.0%	98.75%	269102
J. Pabram	889	50.52%	954	0.0%	99.44%	269115
Jeilatjang (Jeiladjang)	159	84.51%	1092	0.0%	99.37%	269112
Kaimai (Kaimai Kuki and Kaimai Naga)	1162	52.85%	930	0.77%	95.44%	269129
Kaiphundai (Kaiphundai Naga)	390	78.72%	840	0.0%	100.0%	269125
Kandihang	365	51.58%	1160	0.0%	99.73%	269091
Katang	875	82.68%	966	0.0%	99.89%	269100
Katangam (Katangnam)	269	50.64%	1085	0.0%	99.63%	269097
Katiang	183	51.27%	1316	0.0%	100.0%	269096
Karamkha Khasi (Kamranga Khasia / Kamarangkha Khasi)	213	56.32%	1009	0.0%	0.0%	269123
Khedarga Khasi (Khedagor Khasia / Khedargar Khasi)	117	22.22%	828	0.0%	0.0%	269122
Khedraga Mikir (Khedagor Mirkir)	0	NA	NA	NA	NA	269124
Kolbung (Kulbung)	156	59.38%	773	0.0%	100.0%	269140
Lhangnom	306	78.99%	1040	0.0%	100.0%	269139
Longchai	336	86.05%	1087	0.0%	99.11%	269098
Longjon	187	53.37%	948	0.0%	100.0%	269118
Maokot	104	45.74%	1039	0.0%	100.0%	269116
Muktokhal	268	75.0%	1062	0.0%	99.25%	269130
Namtiram	681	94.02%	924	0.0%	98.97%	269105
New Magulong	232	62.56%	1128	0.0%	100.0%	269103
Ngahmunphai (Ngamunphai)	78	74.63%	902	0.0%	100.0%	269121
Ningning (Njingning)	386	48.07%	1086	0.0%	99.74%	269109
Njungkok (Njukuak)	298	79.3%	1292	0.0%	98.66%	269093
Nungkao	1004	48.71%	961	0.0%	96.81%	269126
Oinamlong	1512	37.87%	1016	0.0%	98.68%	269119
Old Kaiphundai (Old Kaiphundai Kuki)	227	60.44%	1083	0.0%	100.0%	269133
Magulong (Old Magulong)	1148	77.79%	969	0.0%	99.56%	269099
Mandu (Old Mandu)	909	61.02%	955	0.0%	94.83%	269090
Pangkotphai	87	59.26%	977	0.0%	100.0%	269142
Phaitol	971	26.01%	1015	0.0%	98.56%	269134
Phelong (Phellong)	537	77.52%	918	0.0%	99.26%	269104
Phoklong	1004	24.94%	992	0.0%	99.5%	269094
Pumram	164	64.38%	1103	0.0%	99.39%	269092
Rangkekilong	188	68.35%	918	0.0%	100.0%	269127
Saramba (Chramram)	692	37.48%	928	0.0%	100.0%	269107
Sibilong	882	75.21%	913	0.0%	98.98%	269128
T. Motbung (Motbung)	133	10.08%	1015	0.0%	100.0%	269137
Taningjam	939	67.09%	1006	0.0%	99.47%	269108
Tatbung	268	75.0%	848	0.0%	99.63%	269132
Thingchamphai	173	86.71%	840	0.0%	100.0%	269135
Thingtatbung	106	69.89%	1038	0.0%	100.0%	269138
Thiulon	1097	69.52%	1043	0.0%	99.64%	269114
Tolen (Tollen)	116	67.62%	1071	0.0%	100.0%	269136
Togoram (Teguaram / Taguaram)	565	61.32%	948	0.0%	99.12%	269095
Tongtao	107	94.23%	911	0.0%	100.0%	269141
Tousem	2063	70.56%	1007	0.0%	99.52%	269089
Vanchengphai	236	85.02%	1107	0.0%	99.58%	269117
Vangaichungpao (Vangaichunpao)	309	48.21%	919	0.0%	100.0%	269131

The following villages do not appear in the 2011 census directory:

- New Mandu
- Deigie
- Tuisemphai
- Rangkekiulong
- Katang Mbeukam
- Taningjam
- Inpa Nkang (J-Pabram)
- Impa Ningdi
- Taijijang
- Charinapang
- Zeiladjang
- Luangkao
- Gamphazol
- Pangmol
