= NH 137 =

NH 137 may refer to:

- National Highway 137 (India)
- New Hampshire Route 137, United States
