= National Highway 137A (India) =

National Highway in India

National Highway 137A
- Map of the National Highway in red

Route information
- Auxiliary route of NH 37
- Length: 46 km (29 mi)

Major junctions
- North end: NH 2 / NH 37 in Wahengbam Leikai
- South end: NH 102 in Kakching Lamkhai

Location
- Country: India
- States: Manipur

Highway system
- Roads in India; Expressways; National; State; Asian
← NH 137	→ NH 38

National Highway 137A, commonly referred to as NH 137A is a national highway in India. It is a spur road of National Highway 37. NH-137A traverses the state of Manipur in India. People of Manipur call the highway as Mayai Lambi (meaning Middle Road in Manipuri).

== Route ==
Wahengbam Leikai(Junction of Imphal-Mayang Imphal road and NH 37), Hiyangthang, Samurou, Wangoi, Mayang Imphal, Wabagai, Kakching, Kakching Lamkhai.

== See also ==
- List of national highways in India
- List of national highways in India by state
