= Ramgaijang =

Ramgaijang is a village near Jiribam in Jiribam district of Manipur, India.
