= Thadou =

Thadou or Thado may refer to:

- Thadou people, an ethnic group in India, Burma and Bangladesh
- Thadou language, a Kuki-Chin language of the Thadou people
