= Jiribam Assembly constituency =

Legislative Assembly constituency in Manipur State, India

Coordinates: 24.79°N 93.13°E

Jiribam
- Constituency for the Manipur Legislative Assembly

Constituency details
- Country: India
- Region: Northeast India
- State: Manipur
- District: Jiribam
- Lok Sabha constituency: Outer Manipur
- Established: 1967
- Total electors: 29,426
- Reservation: None

Member of Legislative Assembly
- 12th Manipur Legislative Assembly
- Incumbent Ashab Uddin
- Party: Bharatiya Janata Party
- Elected year: 2022

Jiribam Legislative Assembly constituency is one of the 60 Legislative Assembly constituencies of Manipur state in India.

It is part of Jiribam district.

== Members of the Legislative Assembly ==
Year	Winner	Party
1967	S. B. Singh	Indian National Congress
1972	S. Bijoy	Indian National Congress
1974	S. Bijoy	Indian National Congress
1980	Devendra Singh	Independent politician
1984	Devendra Singh	Indian National Congress
1990	Th. Debendra	Indian National Congress
1995	Th. Debendra	Indian National Congress
2000	Ashangbam Biren	Manipur State Congress Party
2002	Th. Debendra	Indian National Congress
2007	Thoudam Debendra Singh	Indian National Congress
2012	Thoudam Debendra Singh	Indian National Congress
2017	Achab Uddin	Independent politician
2022	Achab Uddin	Janata Dal

== Election results ==
Vote share of winning candidates
2022	46.21%
2017	35.70%
2012	43.75%
2007	33.47%
2002	31.62%
2000	59.27%
1995	48.70%
1990	48.77%
1984	58.04%
1980	65.43%
1974	34.90%
1967	37.86%

=== 2027 Assembly election ===
2027 Manipur Legislative Assembly election: Jiribam
Party	Candidate	Votes	%	±%
INC				
NDA				
NOTA	None of the above			
Majority				
Turnout				
gain from		Swing		

=== 2022 Assembly election ===
2022 Manipur Legislative Assembly election: Jiribam
Party	Candidate	Votes	%	±%
JD(U)	Ashab Uddin	12,313	46.21%	
BJP	Nameirakpam Budhachandra Singh	11,897	44.65%	30.70%
NPP	Makakmayum Abbas Khan	1,113	4.18%	
INC	Badrur Rahman	746	2.80%	−25.71%
NOTA	Nota	579	2.17%	0.48%
Margin of victory		416	1.56%	−5.63%
Turnout		26,648	90.56%	9.30%
Registered electors		29,426		4.23%
JD(U) gain from Independent		Swing	10.51%	

=== 2017 Assembly election ===
2017 Manipur Legislative Assembly election: Jiribam
Party	Candidate	Votes	%	±%
Independent	Ashab Uddin	8,189	35.70%	
INC	Thoudam Debendra Singh	6,539	28.50%	−15.24%
BJP	Thounaojam Ranabir Singh	3,199	13.95%	
NEIDP	A. Biren Singh	2,812	12.26%	
NPF	Mathiudin Kamei	1,163	5.07%	
NPP	Habib Ali	649	2.83%	
NOTA	None of the Above	389	1.70%	
Margin of victory		1,650	7.19%	1.59%
Turnout		22,940	81.26%	3.69%
Registered electors		28,232		13.72%
Independent gain from INC		Swing	-8.05%	

=== 2012 Assembly election ===
2012 Manipur Legislative Assembly election: Jiribam
Party	Candidate	Votes	%	±%
INC	Thoudam Debendra Singh	8,424	43.75%	10.28%
AITC	A. Biren Singh	7,346	38.15%	
Independent	E. Dipti	1,862	9.67%	
MSCP	Mhod. Jalaluddin	996	5.17%	
CPI	Leetkhongam	627	3.26%	
Margin of victory		1,078	5.60%	0.16%
Turnout		19,256	77.56%	2.09%
Registered electors		24,825		−3.34%
INC hold		Swing	10.28%	

=== 2007 Assembly election ===
2007 Manipur Legislative Assembly election: Jiribam
Party	Candidate	Votes	%	±%
INC	Thoudam Debendra Singh	6,488	33.47%	1.85%
NCP	A. Biren Singh	5,434	28.03%	
Independent	E. Dipti	4,188	21.60%	
Independent	Ch. Engmoi	2,417	12.47%	
RJD	A. Jabbar	319	1.65%	
Independent	Lienkholal Dulen	209	1.08%	
Independent	Thokchom Gokulananda	184	0.95%	
LJP	Singson Letjam	147	0.76%	
Margin of victory		1,054	5.44%	0.07%
Turnout		19,386	75.48%	3.40%
Registered electors		25,684		5.07%
INC hold		Swing	1.85%	

=== 2002 Assembly election ===
2002 Manipur Legislative Assembly election: Jiribam
Party	Candidate	Votes	%	±%
INC	Th. Debendra	5,527	31.62%	2.08%
Manipur National Conference	Ashangbam Biren	4,588	26.24%	
SAP	Md. Habib Ali	3,786	21.66%	
DRPP	E. Dipti	2,388	13.66%	
FPM	Ketrebam Sarat	728	4.16%	
Independent	Tahemang Panmei	465	2.66%	
Margin of victory		939	5.37%	−24.36%
Turnout		17,482	72.08%	−11.50%
Registered electors		24,444		4.22%
INC gain from MSCP		Swing	-17.09%	

=== 2000 Assembly election ===
2000 Manipur Legislative Assembly election: Jiribam
Party	Candidate	Votes	%	±%
MSCP	Ashangbam Biren	10,911	59.27%	
INC	Thoudam Debendra Singh	5,438	29.54%	−19.17%
BJP	E. Dipti	2,061	11.20%	
Margin of victory		5,473	29.73%	27.65%
Turnout		18,410	79.11%	−4.46%
Registered electors		23,455		7.71%
MSCP gain from INC		Swing	10.56%	

=== 1995 Assembly election ===
1995 Manipur Legislative Assembly election: Jiribam
Party	Candidate	Votes	%	±%
INC	Th. Debendra	8,706	48.70%	−0.07%
Independent	A. Biren Singh	8,334	46.62%	
FPM	K. Ningtangpau	835	4.67%	
Margin of victory		372	2.08%	−23.96%
Turnout		17,875	83.57%	4.08%
Registered electors		21,777		3.63%
INC hold		Swing	-0.07%	

=== 1990 Assembly election ===
1990 Manipur Legislative Assembly election: Jiribam
Party	Candidate	Votes	%	±%
INC	Th. Debendra	8,069	48.77%	−9.27%
JD	Habib Ali	3,760	22.73%	
MPP	Z. Biren	3,280	19.82%	18.17%
INS(SCS)	Leihaorambam Projit	1,436	8.68%	
Margin of victory		4,309	26.04%	3.29%
Turnout		16,545	79.50%	0.84%
Registered electors		21,015		29.91%
INC hold		Swing	-9.27%	

=== 1984 Assembly election ===
1984 Manipur Legislative Assembly election: Jiribam
Party	Candidate	Votes	%	±%
INC	Devendra Singh	7,172	58.04%	
Independent	S. Bijoy	4,360	35.28%	
Independent	Abdul Jabar Khan	424	3.43%	
MPP	Nongthombam Brajamani	205	1.66%	−2.38%
Independent	Chongtham Rinachandra	116	0.94%	
Margin of victory		2,812	22.75%	−13.49%
Turnout		12,358	78.66%	3.07%
Registered electors		16,176		14.59%
INC gain from Independent		Swing	-7.40%	

=== 1980 Assembly election ===
1980 Manipur Legislative Assembly election: Jiribam
Party	Candidate	Votes	%	±%
Independent	Devendra Singh	6,731	65.43%	
JP	S. Bijoy	3,003	29.19%	
MPP	Nongthombam Brajamani	415	4.03%	−7.27%
INC(U)	Saikhom Tombi	138	1.34%	
Margin of victory		3,728	36.24%	33.39%
Turnout		10,287	75.59%	0.21%
Registered electors		14,117		25.78%
Independent gain from INC		Swing	30.53%	

=== 1974 Assembly election ===
1974 Manipur Legislative Assembly election: Jiribam
Party	Candidate	Votes	%	±%
INC	S. Bijoy	2,843	34.90%	
Independent	Devendra Singh	2,611	32.05%	
MPP	Khundrakpamshyamkishore	921	11.31%	
Independent	Lalro Tuolor	899	11.04%	
Independent	Iskandar Ali	664	8.15%	
Independent	Nongthombam Brajamani	148	1.82%	
INC(O)	M. Bihari Singh	60	0.74%	
Margin of victory		232	2.85%	
Turnout		8,146	75.38%	75.38%
Registered electors		11,224		−10.15%
INC hold		Swing		

=== 1972 Assembly election ===
1972 Manipur Legislative Assembly election: Jiribam
Party	Candidate	Votes	%	±%
INC	S. Bijoy	Unopposed		
Registered electors		12,492		−26.37%
INC hold		Swing		

=== 1967 Assembly election ===
1967 Manipur Legislative Assembly election: Jiribam
Party	Candidate	Votes	%	±%
INC	S. B. Singh	4,536	37.86%	
Independent	S. Hrangchal	2,301	19.21%	
Independent	Taivel	1,844	15.39%	
Independent	M. T. Ahmed	1,593	13.30%	
Independent	Damkhosat	869	7.25%	
Independent	J. Bardhan	563	4.70%	
SSP	S. I. J. Sharma	275	2.30%	
Margin of victory		2,235	18.65%	
Turnout		11,981	73.91%	
Registered electors		16,965		
INC win (new seat)				

== See also ==
- List of constituencies of the Manipur Legislative Assembly
- Imphal East district
