= Sonapur, Manipur =

Village in Manipur, India

Sonapur is a village near Jiribam in Jiribam district of Manipur, India.

== Notable people ==
- Ashab Uddin, member of the Manipur Legislative Assembly
