= Ashab Uddin (politician) =

Indian Bengali politician

Muhammad Ashab Uddin
- আসহাব উদ্দীন

Member of the Manipur Legislative Assembly
- Incumbent
- Assumed office 2017
- Preceded by: Thoudam Debendra Singh
- Constituency: Jiribam

Personal details
- Born: October 1, 1966 (age 59)
- Party: Janata Dal

Muhammad Achab Uddin,(Bengali: মুহম্মদ আসহাব উদ্দীন), also spelled as Ashab Uddin, is an Indian politician and social worker. He is a two-time member of the Manipur Legislative Assembly, and formerly served as Pradhan for two terms. In October 2024, he faced disqualification from the house following his defection from Janata Dal (United) to BJP.

== Early life and education ==
Muhammad Ashab Uddin was born on 1 October 1966, to a Bengali family of Muslim Pradhans that had been settled in Manipur for over a century. His father was Muhammad Turpan Ali of Sonapur, an employee of the Department of Education in Manipur and the headmaster of Lalpani Aided J. B. School from 1966 to 2004. In 1963, Turpan Ali became the first Muslim to pass the University of Gauhati-conducted Class Tenth Exam. His grandfather, Muhammad Ghulam Rashid, was former Pradhan of Sonapur from 1975 to 1980.

Uddin has completed his education until class 12, and lives in Babupara, Imphal.

== Career ==
Ashab Uddin participated in the 2017 Manipur Legislative Assembly election from Jiribam constituency in Imphal East district. Despite being an independent candidate, he defeated his rival Thoudam Debendra Singh of the Indian National Congress, becoming the first member of the Jiribam minority community to win an election. He resigned on 29 January 2022. In the 2022 Manipur Assembly election, Ashab Uddin was again elected, now as a Janata Dal (United) candidate.
