= Jirighat =

- Village
- Location in Assam, India Jirighat (India)
- Coordinates: 24°47′0″N 93°6′0″E
- Country: India
- State: Assam
- District: Cachar

Government
  - Body: Gram panchayat
- Elevation: 28 m (92 ft)

Languages
  - Official: Bengali and Meitei (Manipuri)
  - Regional: Sylheti
- Time zone: UTC+5:30 (IST)
- PIN: 788104
- ISO 3166 code: IN-AS
- Vehicle registration: AS
- Coastline: 0 kilometres (0 mi)

Jirighat is a block headquarters in Cachar district, Assam, India. Jirighat is a tea estate.

Bengali and Meitei (Manipuri) are the official languages of this place.

== Geography ==
It is located at an elevation of 28 m above MSL.

== Location ==
National Highway 37 (old NH 53) passes through Jirighat.
