= National Highway 137 (India) =

National Highway in India

National Highway 137
- Map of the National Highway in red

Route information
- Length: 68 km (42 mi)

Major junctions
- North end: Rengpang
- South end: Tamenglong

Location
- Country: India
- States: Manipur

Highway system
- Roads in India; Expressways; National; State; Asian
← NH 37	→ NH 137

National Highway 137, commonly referred to as NH 137 is a national highway in India. It is a spur road of National Highway 37. NH-137 traverses the state of Manipur in India.

== Route ==
Rengpang, Khongsang, Tamenglong

== Junctions ==
NH 37 Terminal near Rengpang.

== See also ==
- List of national highways in India
- List of national highways in India by state
