= National Highway 53 (India, old numbering) =

Old numbering of road in India

National Highway 53
- Map of Old NH53 in red

Route information
- Length: 320 km (200 mi)

Major junctions
- West end: Badarpur, Assam
- East end: Imphal, Manipur

Location
- Country: India
- States: Assam: 100 km (62 mi); Manipur: 220 km (140 mi)
- Primary destinations: Silchar, Lakhipur, Nungba

Highway system
- Roads in India; Expressways; National; State; Asian
← NH 52B	→ NH 54

National Highway 53 (NH 53) was a National Highway in Northeast India that connected Badarpur in Assam with Imphal in Manipur. NH 53 started from the junction of old NH 44 at Badarpur and covers a distance of 320 km (200 mi), of which 100 km (62 mi) was in Assam and 220 km (140 mi) was in Manipur. In the new numbering scheme, the road is referred to as National Highway 37.

== Route ==
Silchar, Kashipur, Pailapool, Fulertal, Jiribam, Nungba, Saengrung, Taobam, Noney, Tupul, Keithelmanbi, Khumbong, Imphal.

== See also ==
- List of national highways in India
- National Highways Development Project
