= Hmar People's Convention =

Political party in India

- Founded: 1 December 1985; 40 years ago
- Split from: Mizoram Hmar Association

The Hmar People's Convention (HPC) was established as a political party in December 1986. The organisation was converted from the previous organisation Mizoram Hmar Association.

== History ==
Following the signing of the Mizo Accord, the Mizo National Front gave up the fight for Greater Mizoram. Disappointment of Hmar groups in Southern Manipur and Northeast Mizoram led to the formation of the Hmar People's Convention. The main demand was for an autonomous self-governing area in Northern Mizoram. The group coordinated clashes with other militants groups such as the National Socialist Council of Nagaland and the United Liberation Front of Assam.

Nine rounds of talks from 1992-1994 established a memorandum of settlement between the Mizoram State government and the HPC. The memorandum set up the Sinlung Hills Development council which would be placed under the 6th schedule of the Indian constitution. Further cultural rights and protections were provided in return for giving up arms and severing relationships with Assamese and Naga insurgent groups.

Hmar groups continue to be discontent due to the failure to implement all agreed upon policies of the memorandum of settlement. In particular issues on the demarcation of the council, the appointment of leaders as opposed to elections and issues implementing the Hmar language in the Sinlung Hills District Council.

== Factions ==
- HPC - The Official faction of the Hmar People's Convention is allied with the ruling Zoram People's Movement.
- HPC (R) - Hmar People's Convention (Reformation) is having an alliance with the ruling Mizo National Front.
- HPC (D) - Hmar People's Convention (Democracy) was involved in armed militancy, surrendered and disbanded on 30 April 2026.

== Sources ==
- Dena, Lal,In search of identity: Hmar of North-East India,New Delhi 2008, ISBN 978-81-8370-134-1
