= Kuki–Naga conflict in Manipur =

Ethnic conflict in Manipur, India

In the state of Manipur in northeast India, conflict arose between the Kukis and Nagas soon after India's independence. The Nagas, who dominated the northern hill regions of the state, attempted to homogenise the area in order to demand integration with the Naga Hills region further north. This caused displacement of Kukis to the southern districts as well as the central hill regions during the 1950s. Major clashes again occurred during 1992-98, leading to the deaths of more than 1,000 people and displacement of 50,000–100,000 people.

== Historical background ==
In the early 19th century, when the British established their protectorate over the state of Manipur, the Kuki tribes were said to be inhabiting the hills to the south of the Manipur valley, while the Naga tribes were distributed in the hills to the north. This changed over the following decades, with the Kuki tribes migrating north and settling throughout the hills of Manipur. This was assumed to be due to pressure from the tribes further south, the Lushais (present-day Mizos) and Kamhau-Suktes.

This movement caused the Kuki and Naga tribes to live side by side in most of the hills surrounding the Manipur valley. This cohabitation does not appear to have been any cause for friction. There were many instances where the Nagas invited the Kukis to settle next to them for their own protection and for mediating disputes between their own kindred tribes and settlements.

At the time of the British departure from India, the Nagas of the Naga Hills district (present-day Nagaland) had formed the Naga National Council, demanding independence for Naga-inhabited areas. There was also a movement among the Nagas for Manipur for integration with Naga Hills. In 1948, the Naga leader Athikho Daiho submitted a memorandum to the Union home minister Vallabhbhai Patel laying out the demand for such integration.

== Conflict in the 1950s and 1960s ==
The pre-2017 district configuration of Manipur marks some of the subdivisions of the 1950s and 1960s

The moderate Naga People's Convention held in 1957 did not include Manipur's Naga-inhabited areas in its "unified Nagaland" proposal. Meanwhile, the Manipur Naga Council, set up in 1956, merged with the Naga National Council (NNC) in 1957, and its leaders joined the NNC's underground movement. Scholar Thongkholal Haokip states that the desire for integration with "unified Nagaland" caused the Nagas of Manipur to strive for a homogenous population in the Naga-dominated northern hill areas. Two strategies were adopted, one being to "Naga-nise" the smaller tribes to a Naga identity, and other was to drive out the Kuki tribes living in their midst. Thus began the exercise of threats and forced eviction of Kuki villages.

A comparison of census data from 1951 and 1961 reveals that, during the ten-year time span, the Ukhrul Subdivision had lost 30 villages, the Tamenglong Subdivision 77 villages, and Mao region 14 villages. During the same time period, there was an increase of 27 villages in the Churachandpur Subdivision and 23 villages in the Tengnoupal-Chandel subdivision. These changes indicate the displacement of Kuki populations from the Naga-dominated districts to the districts considered safer for the Kukis. In addition some of the displaced Kukis from the Naga-dominated sistricts also moved inward into the Sadar Hills subdivision (now Kangpokpi district). (Note: A district referred to as Manipur North, or "Mao and Sadar Hills" was established in the district organisation of 1969. It had a Sadar Hills subdivision headquartered at Saikul.) Those in the northeastern hills of Ukhrul district also moved across the border to the Kabaw Valley in Burma. They were to be evicted again by General Ne Win's military regime of Burma around 1967, returning to Manipur via Moreh.

== Clashes in the 1990s ==
In 1992, "Kukis who [had] settled after 1972 in the Naga areas" had to leave after the United Naga Council made a decision. They believe that the Kukis have encroached upon Naga areas, and much of the land inhabited by the Kukis is claimed as a part of the "Greater Nagalim." The Naga insurgents consider the continued residence of Kukis in these areas as the prime obstacle to realizing their concept of Nagalim. The Nagas also alleged the following:

- The KNA has operated against the Naga terrorist in full connivance with the paramilitary forces and civil authorities
- The Kukis are demanding a Greater Kukiland comprising Churachandpur district, some areas of Ukhrul district, and Kuki-inhabited areas of Myanmar
- The Kukis are demanding their revenue district with parts of Ukhrul, Senapati, and Tamenglong districts

On the other hand, the Kukis claim that the areas in which they are residing are their ancestral land, and they had opened it for Zeliangrong Nagas to settle in return for taxes and tributes after they were driven out by the Sukte Poi and Lusei people of Chin Hills and present-day Mizoram. The Kukis further alleged that the atrocities from the NSCN led movement such as the imposition of taxes, forced eviction from their villages, and the inability of the State Government to protect them are the main causes of the conflict.

=== Nature of the violence ===
The Kuki-Naga conflict has witnessed several instances of violence, including armed clashes, attacks on villages, kidnapping, and targeted killings. Both sides have accused each other of human rights violations, leading to a cycle of retaliatory violence and counter-violence. The conflict has also taken a toll on civilian lives, with numerous casualties reported over the years. The violence delays the infrastructure development of the Manipur. The construction of ambitious dam projects like Mapithel Dam and Khuga Dam was a standstill during this violence.

=== Incidents ===
It started in June 1992, when a Kuki youth was kidnapped at Moreh Bazar by suspected Naga extremists and was later found dead in a nearby Jungle. On 04.05.1992, the Kuki Students’ Organisation (KSO) announced a warning to the Nagas to leave Moreh town within 24 hours leading to a mass exodus of the Nagas. On 12.09.1992, the Kuki War Declaration Committee thereafter declared war against the Nagas. (Thinglang Post Publication 22 September 1992).

On 15 April 1993, KNA militants killed four Naga militants and set ablaze their houses in the Parouland and Kutal Khuthak villages of Chandel district. On 13 September 1993, Naga militants allegedly belonging to the NSCN-IM massacred around 115 Kuki civilians in the hills of Manipur. The Kukis refer to the killings as the Joupi massacre named after the village which saw the highest number of casualties. In 1993, 320 died (260 Kukis and 60 Nagas), and a total of 3434 houses were set ablaze.

On 19 October 1994, a bus plying from Noney to Imphal via New Cachar Road with 45 passengers in it. When the bus reached a village called "Sinam Khul", 40 well-armed cadres of the Kuki National Front (KNF) stopped the bus and called out Meiteis. But none of the Meities came out out of fear. Assuming that no Meiteis were inside the bus and all were Nagas, the KNF pushed the bus down the gorge with 45 passengers in it. Together 30 Nagas, 5 Meities and 2 Non Manipuris died while 12 were injured. In 1994, 67 Nagas and 44 Kukis were killed and 677 Houses (Naga-445, Kuki-232) were set ablaze in the clash.

In 1995, 65 Kukis and 45 Nagas were killed and 1057 houses (404 Kuki and 653 Nagas) were set ablaze. After 1995, the incidents of clashes were reduced considerably.

In 1996, 53 were killed and 188 houses (61 Kukis and 127 Naga) were set ablaze.

In 1997, 54 Kukis and 38 Nagas were killed. 245 houses (Kuki-212, Nagas-33) were set ablaze.

In 1998, 16 Kukis and 25 Nagas were killed and 27 houses of Kukis were set ablaze.

As per the UNC report 1992-1997, a total of about 470 Kukis and 207 Nagas were killed in the ensuing clash, about 205 Kukis and 197 Nagas were injured and about 2870 Kuki houses and 2582 Naga houses were burnt.

=== Attempts at resolution ===
Over the years, several attempts have been made by the government and civil society organizations to address the conflict and reconcile the Kuki and Naga communities. Peace talks, dialogues, and confidence-building measures have been initiated at various times to resolve the dispute peacefully. The multiple factors that have led to the conflict, and the resultant clashes, are still very much there at present. Different views over the exclusive rights of land ownership continue to be a problem.

The conflict ended without a proper agreement. At present Kukis celebrate 'Black Day' or "Sahnit-Ni" for three days 11-13 September. At the same time, Nagas under UNC(United Naga Council) reprimanded Kukis for playing 'the only victim'.

== Bibliography ==
- John F. Hurst (1891). Indika: The Country and the people of India and Ceylon, Newyork: Harper & Brothers, P. 123.
- Butalia, Urvashi (2008), Interrogating Peace: the Naga – Kuki Conflict in Manipur, Bonn: Evangelischer Entwicklungsdienst e.V. (EED)
- Haokip, D. Michael (2007). "Kuki-Naga Conflict with Special Reference to the Chandel District of Manipur". In Lazar Jeyaseelan (ed.). Conflict Mapping and Peace Processes in North East India (PDF). North Eastern Social Research Centre. pp. 145–184. Archived from the original (PDF) on 18 December 2023.
- Haokip, Thongkholal (2013), "Essays on the Kuki–Naga Conflict: A Review", Strategic Analysis, 37 (2): 251–259, doi:10.1080/09700161.2012.755785
- Haokip, Thongkholal (2023), "Home and Belonging in Northeast India", in Amit Ranjan; Diotima Chattoraj (eds.), Migration, Regional Autonomy, and Conflicts in Eastern South Asia: Searching for a Home(land), Springer Nature, ISBN 9783031287640
- Haokip, Thongkholal (January 2023), "Territoriality, Conflict and Citizenship in the India–Myanmar Borderlands", The Journal of Indian and Asian Studies, 4 (1), doi:10.1142/S2717541323500018
- Kipgen, Nehginpao (October–December 2011), "Ethnic Conflict in India: A Case Study of the Kukis and the Nagas in Manipur", The Indian Journal of Political Science, 72 (4): 1043–1060, JSTOR 41856539
- Mangi Singh, S. (April–June 2009), "Understanding Conflict: An Insight into the Factors Responsible for the Kuki-Naga Clashes in Manipur during the 1990s", The Indian Journal of Political Science, 70 (2): 495–508, JSTOR 42743912
- Tohring, S. R. (2010), Violence and Identity in North-east India: Naga-Kuki Conflict, Mittal Publications, ISBN 9788183243445
- Vashum, Reisang (2000), Nagas' Rights to Self Determination: An Anthropological-historical Perspective, Mittal Publications, ISBN 9788170997740
