= Jiribam =

Town in Manipur, India

- Town
- Location in Manipur, India Jiribam (India)
- Coordinates: 24.8106°N 93.1155°E
- Country: India
- State: Manipur
- District: Jiribam

Population (2011)
  - Total: 7,343

Language(s)
  - Official: Meitei (officially called Manipuri)
- Time zone: UTC+5:30 (IST)
- Postal code: 795116
- Vehicle registration: MN
- Website: manipur.gov.in

Jiribam (Meitei pronunciation:/jee-ree-baam/) is a town governed by a municipal council in the Jiribam district of the state of Manipur, India. It is one of the fastest-growing towns in Manipur.

The town is located on the state's westernmost boundary, adjoining the Cachar district of Assam. It is also known as the western gate of Manipur. Jiribam town is inhabited by the Meiteis, Bengalis, and various other communities.

== Geography ==
Jiribam is located in a small valley in the western hill ranges of Manipur, on the bank of the Jiri River, near its confluence with the Barak River. The Jiri River having been defined as the border of Manipur in this area, only the left bank (eastern bank) of the river constitutes the Jiribam town. The right bank (western bank) of the river in the same valley has the town of Jirighat in the Cachar district of Assam.

== History ==
At the beginning of the 19th century, the Jiribam valley appears to have been part of the Cachar kingdom. After annexing the kingdom in 1832, the British made an agreement with Raja Gambhir Singh of Manipur ceding all claims to the territory between the eastern stretch of the Barak River (Note: The Barak River flows south till Tipaimukh and then makes an almost 180°-bend to flow north till Jirimukh. The region between these two stretches might have been contested between Manipur and Kachar prior to 1833.) and the Jiri River. Thus the eastern and southern portion of the Jiribam valley came under the control of Manipur, while the rest remained under Cachar which became part of Assam.

The Jiribam Valley was at that time forested and uninhabited. The Cachar portion of the valley had a ferry port at Jirighat, which was used by the travellers on the Silchar–Manipur road (called "Cachar Road" in Manipur). The Manipur state government decided to open the valley for agricultural settlement in 1907, and by 1911, 14,346 bighas land is said to have been settled. Rice and sugarcane were cultivated, and betel leaf (pan) in areas unsuitable for rice cultivation.

By 1931, there were 46 villages in the Jiribam settlement, populated by Manipuri (Meitei) Hindus and Muslims, Bengali Hindus and Muslims, a few Kukis and Kabuis. Jiribam also had 5 primary schools, the same number as in the Imphal Valley outside the city of Imphal. Most of the settlers in Jiribam came from the Cachar district, very few from the Imphal Valley (Manipur valley). This meant that the settlers had to be treated as 'British subjects' rather than 'Manipur state subjects' and revenue settlement orders and dispute resolutions had to be carried out by the British Political Agent.

After the independence of India, Manipur elected a legislative assembly under its own constitution. Ten seats in the assembly were allocated to the hill areas, which included Jiribam. Soon afterwards, Manipur merged into India and was governed under the Constitution of India as a union territory. (Note: In 1950, it was termed a Part 'C' state, later changed to 'union territory' in 1956.) The territory of Manipur was divided into 8 subdivisions, one of which was based at Jiribam. The Jiribam subdivision covered the Vangai range, and stretched up to Tipaimukh in the south. It was designated as a hill subdivision. In 1969, when Manipur was divided into five districts, the southern part of the Jiribam subdivision was separated into the Tipaimukh subdivision of the 'Manipur South' district (now in Pherzawl district), while the northern part was added to the 'Manipur Central' district headquartered at Imphal. This also meant that Jiribam became part of the valley area of Manipur, rather than hill area. To avoid the anomaly, the eastern part consisting of the Vangai range was transferred to the Tipaimukh subdivision. With the reorganisation of 'Manipur Central', Jiribam got attached to the Imphal East district. In 2016, Jiribam subdivision became an independent Jiribam district.

In 2017, a Manipur Legislative Assembly election candidate from the Bengali community, Md Ashab Uddin, became the first member of the Jiribam minority community to win an election.

== Climate ==
Jiribam's climate is humid subtropical which is characterised by short winters and long summers with heavy rainfall. As are many areas in India, Jiribam is subject to powerful monsoons.

Jiribam lies under the direct influence of southwest monsoon season and rainfall is abundant compared to other places in the state. About twenty to thirty percent of annual rainfall occurs during the pre-monsoon season in the month of May. About sixty to seventy percent of rainfall occurs in the rainy season which runs from the second half of June to September. The average rainfall during the rainy season ranges from 1,000 to 1,600 mm (39.4 to 63.0 in).

Jiribam is humid with a moderately hot temperature. The months of May and June are the hottest. The hottest temperatures are recorded in May at about 40 °C (104 °F). The temperature is very pleasant in autumn, which falls around September to November. The lowest temperatures are recorded from the second half of December to the first half of January where temperatures can fall below 2.78 °C (37.00 °F) at late night. However, days are comfortably warm even in this period.

== Demographics ==
As of 2001 India census, Jiribam had a population of 6,426. Males constitute 49 percent of the population and females 51 percent. Jiribam has an average literacy rate of 73 percent, which is higher than the national average of 59.5 percent. Male literacy is 80 percent while female literacy is 66 percent. In Jiribam, 13 percent of the population is less than six years of age.

The Meitei language-speakers are the majority in the town, numbering 3,953 people (61.5%) and Bengali speakers number 1,230 people (19.1%). Other languages include Kabui, Hmar, Paite and Thadou.

== Politics ==
Jiribam is part of the Outer Manipur (Lok Sabha constituency).

== Economy ==
The Jiribam town is the administrative headquarters of the subdivision. It is also a growth centre, which provides medical, educational and commercial facilities in and around the region. According to the 2001 census, 80 percent of its working population is engaged in non-agricultural activities and the main function of the town is categorised as "services". About 20 percent of the population are government employees, which provides more income than other sectors.

== Transport ==
Jiribam railway station was the first railway station in Manipur. This station provides connectivity to Silchar. Jiribam will be connected to Imphal through 111 kilometre Jiribam-Tupul-Imphal railway line. After the commissioning of the line important trains like the Rajdhani Express, superfast trains will pass through it. NH 37 also passes through the Town which connects it to Imphal and Silchar .

== Bibliography ==
- Census of India, Manipur, Part II (PDF), 1972
- Manipur Administrative Atlas (PDF), Census of India, Government of India, 2005
- Allen, B. C.; Gait, E. A.; Allen, C. G. H.; Howard, H. F. (1979) [1857], Gazetteer of Bengal and North-East India, Delhi: Mittal Publications – via archive.org
- Harvey, C. W. L. (1932), Administration Report of The Manipur State For The Year 1931-32, Imphal: The State Printing Press – via archive.org
