= Kuki Inpi =

The Kuki Inpi is the traditional form of local government of the tribal Kuki people. While it exists at the village level, higher levels of Kuki Inpi at the district or the state levels are also formed depending on need. Kuki Inpi Manipur is a prominent state-level organisation in the state of Manipur. After becoming dormant in the early 20th century, it was revived in 1993 in order to safeguard the Kuki people against ethnic conflicts. It currently functions as a social network of the leaders of the community.

== Background ==
The traditional system of government of the Kuki people was called Kuki Inpi. It had an upper house, called Upa Inpi, and a lower house, called Haosa Inpi. Both of them were made up of Kuki clan chiefs ("Phung Upas") and village chiefs ("Kho Haosas"). The king of Tripura was the symbolic head of the government, referred to as "Kumpi". (Note: "Kumpi" is often translated as "emperor". But the real position of the king of Tripura was symbolic, similar to that of Caliph for Muslim communities in the pre-modern times.)

After the advent of the British colonial rule, the Kuki Inpi government became dormant, even though the village chiefs continued to function in their traditional roles. The Kukis believe that, after the independence of India and Myanmar, the governments of these nation-states failed to safeguard the Kuki populations. It is said that between 1990 and 1998, 360 Kuki villages were destroyed and 900 Kuki people were killed, across the states of Tripura, Manipur, Nagaland, Assam and Chin State. This crisis led to the revival of the Kuki Inpi organisations at district and state levels, which function as civil society organisations.

== Kuki Inpis at state and district levels ==
The state-level organisation of Kuki Inpi in Manipur was revived on 29 June 1993 at the Kuki Inn in Imphal. A meeting of Kuki tribal leaders attended by 232 people, voted to revive the organisation under the name "Kuki Inpi Manipur", rejecting other proposed titles such as "Kuki Security Council" and "Kuki Zomi Council". Similar organisations were soon formed in the states of Nagaland, Assam and others. Kuki Inpis were also formed in Delhi and the United States to serve the migrant Kuki populations.

An apex body of Kuki Inpis called "Kumpipa" was also formed, with a president Athong Limthang Sompijang. The Kuki Inpi of Nagaland distanced itself from the other Kuki inpis.

Kuki Inpi Manipur is headed by Ch. Ajang Khongsai in 2023. There are also district-level Kuki Inpis in Manipur.

== Activities ==
In the wake of the 2023 Manipur violence, Kuki Inpi Manipur called for a separate state for Kuki people to be created out of Manipur, under Article 3 of the Indian Constitution. The decision for the call was taken in a cabinet meeting of the governing group on 12 July 2023.

== See also ==
- Kuki State Demand Committee

== Bibliography ==
- Haokip, Thongkholal (March 2011), "Paradoxes within the Kuki Nation", Voice of the Hills, 2, SSRN 1808676
- Lunkim, T. (2012), "Traditional System of Kuki Administration", in Thongkholal Haokip (ed.), The Kukis of Northeast India: Politics and Culture, Bookwell, pp. 1–, ISBN 9789380574448
- Tohring, S. R. (2010), Violence and Identity in North-east India: Naga-Kuki Conflict, Mittal Publications, ISBN 9788183243445
