= Jiri River =

River in India

- Location within Assam Location within India
- Native name: জিৰি নদী (Assamese)

Location
- State: Assam & Manipur

Physical characteristics
- Source: Dima Hasao District
  - location: Assam
  - coordinates: 25°10′42.9″N 93°20′58.3″E
- Mouth: Barak River
  - location: Jirimukh, Assam-Manipur border
  - coordinates: 24°42′42.9″N 93°04′54.7″E

Basin features
- Progression: Jiri River - Barak River

The Jiri River is a tributary of the Barak River in the Indian state of Assam. The river originates from Boro Ninglo area of Dima Hasao district. The Jiri river serves as the inter-state boundary between Manipur and Assam and joins the Barak River at Jirimukh (Jiri-mukh where mukh means mouth in Assamese language).
