= Thadou people =

Tribe of Kuki people

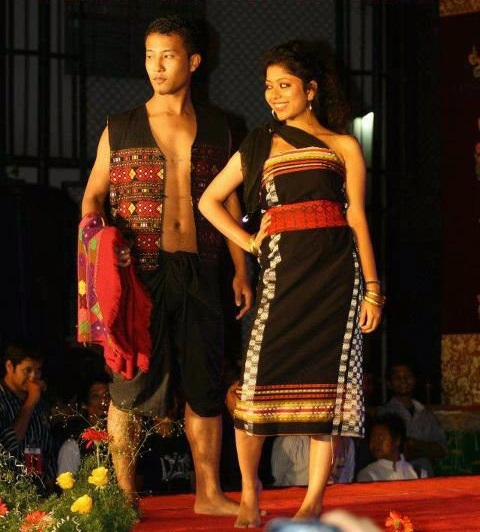
- Thadou man and woman in traditional dress

Total population
- 229,000–313,000 in India

Regions with significant populations
- India, Myanmar, Bangladesh, Manipur, Nagaland, Assam, Mizoram, Tripura

Languages
- Thadou

Religion
- Predominantly Protestantism (Baptist) and Catholicism; very small minority Judaism (Bnei Menashe)

Related ethnic groups
- Zo people; Chin; Kuki; Mara; Bnei Menashe; Ranglong; Mizo

Thadou people, also called Thadou Kukis, are the Thadou language-speaking Kuki people inhabiting Northeast India, Myanmar, and Bangladesh. "Thadou" is also the name of a particular clan among the Thadou Kukis. Other clans of Thadou Kukis include Haokip, Kipgen, Doungel, Hangshing, Mangvung etc.

== Identity ==
The issues of identity with reference to "Thadou" are complex, since Thadou is the name of a clan (originating from an ancestor called Thadou), and also the name of a language spoken by other clans unrelated to Thadou and some clans "senior" to Thadou. There is a tendency to refer to all Thadou language-speakers as "Thadous", as if they form a tribe called "Thadou". But this is resented by some of the other clans. There is nothing to suggest that the entirety of Thadou language-speakers ever organised themselves as a tribe. The Gazeetteer of Manipur (1886) noted that the Kukis, in particular the Thadou Kukis, were organised in terms of clans rather than tribes.

Prior to the arrival of the British, the Manipuris referred to the Thadou Kukis as "Khongjais". The British replaced this term with "Kukis", which was accepted by Thadou Kukis without reservation, even though the term applied equally to all Kuki-Chin language-speaking people (now referred to as Kuki-Zo people). After the departure of the British, tribes such as the Paites and Zous as well as the "Old Kukis" disowned the "Kuki" label, calling it a "colonial imposition". As a result, Thadou Kukis remained the only people continuing the use of "Kuki", almost turning it into a tribe identity. This has been pointed out as a misappropriation of the term, since the "Kuki" label belongs to all the Kuki-Zo people, not only the Thadou Kukis. The Kuki National Organisation leaders proposed "Khochungte" as an alternative label for the Thadou Kuki identity, which has however not come into common use.

Many Thadou language-speakers simply refer to themselves as "Kukis". Some also refer to their language as "Kuki" instead of "Thadou". The correct terminology remains a matter of continuing debate.

== Distribution ==
According to the 2011 census of India, there are 229,000 Thadou language-speakers in the country. The vast majority of them (97.6%) are in the state of Manipur. Within Manipur, the Thadou Kukis number 216,000, making up the largest single tribal group, forming about 19% of all its Scheduled Tribes (8.4% of the state population). There are also significant numbers of Thadou-speakers in Meghalaya and Assam.

In addition, many Thadou language-speakers are also believed to list their language as "Kuki" in the census. The 2011 census lists 84,000 "Kuki" language-speakers, who are mostly distributed in the states of Nagaland, Manipur and Assam.

== Clans ==
The Gazetteer of Manipur (1886) listed the following clans of Kukis:

- Thado [Thadou]
- Vungson
- Changsen
- Shingsol [Singson]
- Mangvung
- Khlangam
- Chungloe [Chongloi]
- Changput
- Haukib [Haokip]
- Simmte [Simte]
- Kamhau

Of these, Simte is now recognised as a separate tribe, and Kamhau is recognised as a clan or sub-clan of Tedim Chins. The remaining clans are part of Thadou Kukis.

William Shaw's Notes on Thadou Kukis (1929) lists these prominent clans: Shitlhous (Sitlhous) as being predominant in the northwest hills of Manipur (main base at Jampi), Dongngels (Doungels) predominant in the northeast hills, Haokips distributed on all sides of the Manipur hills but mostly on the northeast, Kipgens being mainly to the west of Imphal Valley, Shingsons (Singsons) being to the southwest of the Imphal Valley, and Chonglois, Hangshings and Phohils mixed in with other clans throughout the hills.

== Bibliography ==
- Language: India, States and Union Territories (Table C-16) (PDF), Registrar General of India, 2018
- Dun, E. W. (1992) [1886], Gazetteer of Manipur, Manas Publications – via archive.org
- Haokip, Seilen (2012), "What Price, Twenty Years of Peace in Mizoram (1986–2006): A Kuki Perspective", in Thongkholal Haokip (ed.), The Kukis of Northeast India: Politics and Culture, Bookwell, pp. 89–, ISBN 9789380574448
- Haokip, D. Michael (2007). "Kuki-Naga Conflict with Special Reference to the Chandel District of Manipur". In Lazar Jeyaseelan (ed.). Conflict Mapping and Peace Processes in North East India (PDF). North Eastern Social Research Centre. pp. 145–184. Archived from the original (PDF) on 18 December 2023.
- Haokip, Ngamkhohao (2012), "Politics of Tribe Identity with reference to the Kukis", Journal of North East India Studies, 2 (2): 64–73 – via academia.edu
- Haokip, Seikhogin (2012), "Genesis of Kuki Autonomy Movement in Northeast India", in Thongkholal Haokip (ed.), The Kukis of Northeast India: Politics and Culture, Bookwell, pp. 53–, ISBN 9789380574448
- Shaw, William (1929), Notes on the Thadou Kukis, Government of Assam – via archive.org
- Lieut. R. Stewart in the Journal of the Asiatic Society of Bengal (1857). entitled "A slight notice of the Grammar of Thadou or New Kookie language."
