= National Highway 37 (India) =

National highway in India

National Highway 37
- Map of National Highway 37 in red

Route information
- Length: 356 km (221 mi)

Major junctions
- East end: NH 2 / NH 137A in Imphal, Manipur
- List: NH 137 in Khongsang, Manipur; NH 27 / NH 306 in Silchar, Assam; NH 6 in Panchgram, Assam; NH 8 in Karimganj, Assam
- West end: Sutarkandi, Assam

Location
- Country: India
- States: Assam, Manipur

Highway system
- Roads in India; Expressways; National; State; Asian
← NH 36	→ NH 38

Schematic map of National Highways in India

National Highway 37 (NH 37) is a National Highway in India. This highway runs between Badarpur near Karimganj in Assam and Imphal in Manipur. This route was formerly called National Highway 53.

This highway was also used for the cycling event in the 2016 South Asian Games.

An Emergency Landing Facility (Road Runway) was activated on the Moran Bypass of National Highway-37 in the Dibrugarh District, Assam on 14 February 2026. At a cost of Rs.100 crores, it was inaugurated with a landing by an IAF C-130J during the Prime Minister's visit to the state. Spanning 4.6 kilometres, it is the First ELF located in Northeast India.
