= Kuki people =

Ethnic group in India, Bangladesh, and Myanmar

- Kuki youth in traditional attire

Regions with significant populations
- India: Not stated
- Myanmar: Not stated
- Bangladesh: Not stated

Languages
- Kuki-Chin languages

Religion
- Predominantly Christianity (Baptist); historically Animism with sizeable minorities following Animism, Judaism (Bnei Menashe) and Islam

Related ethnic groups
- Chins · Halams · Mizos · Zomis · Others (Karbis, Nagas, Meiteis, Kachins)

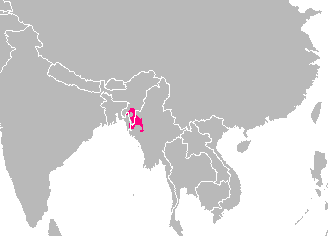
Approximate extent of the area traditionally inhabited by the Kuki people

The Kuki people, or Kuki-Zo people, are an ethnic group in the Northeastern Indian states of Manipur, Nagaland, Assam, Meghalaya, Tripura and Mizoram, as well as the neighbouring countries of Bangladesh and Myanmar. The Kukis form one of the largest hill tribe communities in this region. In Northeast India, they are present in all states except Arunachal Pradesh. The Chin people of Myanmar and the Mizo people of Mizoram are kindred tribes of the Kukis. Collectively, they are termed the Zo people.

Some fifty tribes of Kuki peoples in India are recognised as scheduled tribes in India, based on the dialect spoken by that particular Kuki community as well as their region of origin.

== Name ==
The term "Kuki" is an exonym: it was used by Bengalis to refer to the tribes inhabiting Patkai–Arakan Yomas, the eastern extension of the Himalayas running north–south between India and Myanmar. The term is witnessed in the chronicles of Tripura from the reign of Dhanya Manikya (r. 1490–1515) and fairly regularly afterwards. From even earlier, a couplet in Sanskrit is found mentioning a 12th century land grant in Kukisthana (Kuki-land). The Tibetan Buddhist writer Taranatha (1575–1634) wrote a description of the Kuki (Ko-ki) country, including in it almost the entire eastern hill range and beyond. The term also occurs in traditional Meitei hymns where the Kuki king is praised along with the Meitei king.

The term came into British usage in 1777, when the chief of Chittagong appealed to the British governor general Warren Hastings for help against Kuki raids from the hills.

The same collection of tribes were called "Chins" by the Burmese (spelt "Khyangs" in the original Burmese spelling). The British also used the term "Lushais" to refer to the tribes inhabiting the Lushai Hills region to the south of the Manipur valley, eventually dividing it into separate "Lushai Hills" in India and "Chin Hills" in Burma.

Over time, the British came to distinguish the tribes currently called "Kukis" from the remaining "Lushais". An Intelligence Branch report from 1907 listed Ralte, Paite, Thadou, Lakher, Hmar and Poi tribes among Kukis. It stated that each of these tribes had its own language, and these languages were unintelligible to the "Lushais".

The Manipuris used the term "Khongjai" (Note: Alternative spellings: Khongchai and Khongsai.) to refer to the tribes to the south and southwest of the Imphal Valley, a usage witnessed from 1508. This appears to have been a geographical term. (Note: Other Kukis were referred to as "Takhens" (Tripuris), "Tekhao" (Assamese) and "Saitons" (inhabiting the Saiton hills) in the Manipur Chronicles.) The "Old Kuki" tribes in Manipur were referred to by their individual names, which were also partly of geographical origin.

Some Kuki and Chin tribes reject both of these terms as being of colonial origin, and use the self-designation "Zo", which is a generic term that has variants in most Kuki-Chin dialects. "Zomi" (meaning "Zo people") is also used. The term "Kuki" is still enthusiastically adopted by the Thadou language-speaking clans. Thus, "Kuki" is sometimes used in this narrow sense to refer to the Thadou-speaking Kukis, with even the Thadou language referred to as the "Kuki language".

By 2023, a consensus seems to have developed among the Kuki tribes of Manipur to use the compound term "Kuki-Zo" to refer to themselves.

== History ==
=== Early history ===
Ethnologist C. A. Soppitt argued that the Kuki tribes must have settled in region west of Irrawaddy River from before the 11th century, based on the fact that they had no traces of Buddhism, which was already prevalent in Burma by that time. He grouped the Kuki tribes into two broad classes: Hrangkhol along with the co-tribe Biate in one class, and Changsan along with the co-tribe Thadou in the other class. Each of them was grouped with several subtribes. Soppitt suggested that, by the 16th century, the Hrangkhols and Biate inhabited the Lushai Hills region (currently divided between Mizoram and Chin State). He believed that they were pushed out by Changsan, who moved in from the east along with Thadou, forcing them to move to the North Cachar Hills, Manipur and Tripura. Further, the Changsan–Thadou combine was believed to have been in turn forced out by newer tribes in the 19th century, and then followed the same routes as the earlier tribes. The first two groups were referred to as Old Kukis and New Kukis by the British administrators, which did not receive endorsement from Soppitt. Modern scholars also disapprove the terminology of "Old Kukis" and "New Kukis", but it does appear that the two groups followed different migration routes and thus developed significant cultural differences.

Per the 1881 census, the Kukis are estimated to have numbered 20,000 in the North Cachar Hills (present-day Dima Hasao district), 15,000 in the Naga Hills (present-day Nagaland), 30,000–40,000 in Manipur and 6,000 in Tipperah (Tripura). In addition, the plains of Cachar had 6,000 people. The Gazetteer of Manipur (1886), based on the same census, noted that the Kukis of Manipur wee composed of approximately 8,000 "Old Kukis" and 17,000 "New Kukis". Borders of Manipur were expanded after this date to include the Kuki-inhabited southern parts of the present Churachandpur and Chandel districts, adding further Kuki populations to the state of Manipur. (Note: The southern part of the Churachandpur and Chandel districts were added to Manipur in 1894 during a Manipur-Chin Hills border settlement.) During the Kuki Rebellion of 1917–1919, the Kukis in Manipur were estimated to number 40,000.

=== Manipur ===
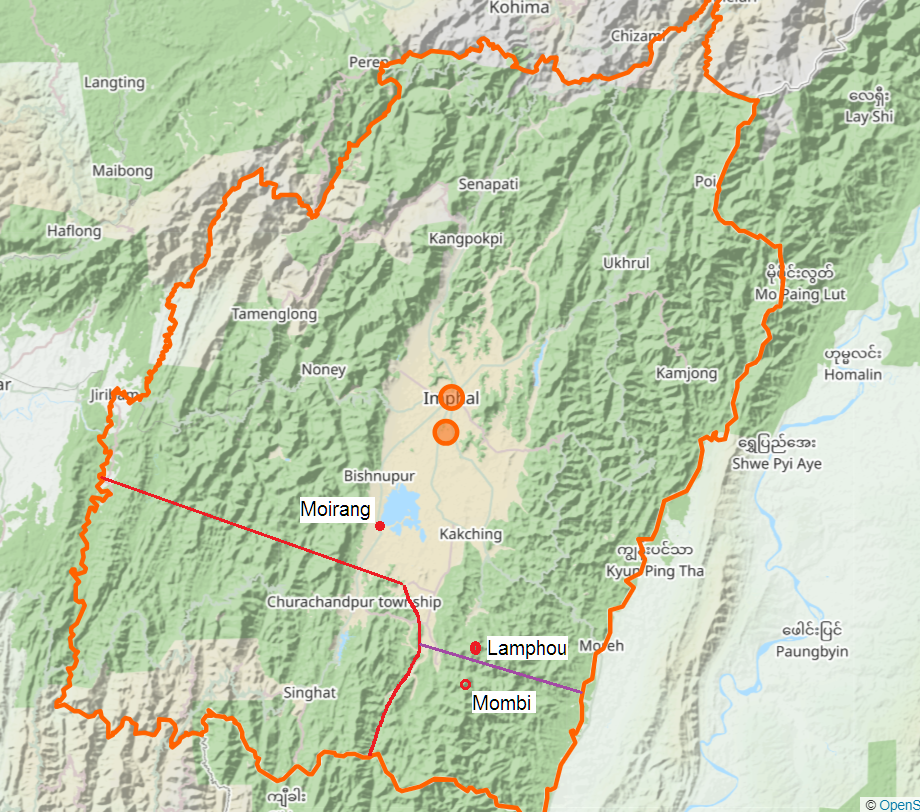
The princely state of Manipur with approximate southern borders prior to 1894

Picture from "Descriptive Ethnology of Bengal" (1872), Edward Tuite Dalton CSI

Cheitharol Kumbaba, the court chronicle of the Manipur kings, mentions various Kuki tribes and clans from 1404 onwards. The largest of the Kuki tribes, the Thadous, lived in the southern hills of the present-day Manipur, which was ungoverned territory for most of the historical period. The Manipuris referred to them as "Khongjais". (Note: "Khongjai" is the British spelling of the name. The Manipuris spelt it as "Khongchai" and the Kukis as "Khongsai".) The naming was apparently based on a village called "Khongchai" in the Tuipui river valley, (Note: Judging from the description, the village is likely to have been in the vicinity of present-day Leijangphai, on the National Highway 2.) with the surrounding hills also referred to as Khongjai Hills. The Manipur ruler Bhagya Chandra (also known as Jai Singh) made war on this region in 1786, and subjugated the Kuki chieftain in the central village. Other regions in southern hills remained relatively untouched until 1894 when the British defined the border of the Manipur state to include the southern hills.

The term "Kuki" to refer to these tribes was introduced by the British in the 1820s. By 1850s, they imported the terminology of "New Kuki" for the Khongjai tribes and "Old Kuki" for the other Kuki tribes such as Kom and Aimol. The scholars of Kuki Research Forum consider the terminology misleading because the historical record does not justify such a progression in time.

The British testimony regarding Kukis in Manipur was variable. British Commissioner Pemberton wrote in 1835 that the Khongjais stretched along the hills from the south of the Manipur valley to the Arakan Mountains. British Residents, William McCulloch (1844–1863) and Colonel Johnstone (1877–1886), wrote that Khongjais had long been subjects of Manipur, but "new immigrants" of them came through between 1830 and 1840. They "poured into the hill tracts" in large numbers, according to the Residents, driving away the older inhabitants. The Residents believed that these Khongjais were driven north by stronger tribes from the south, and hence settled all around the Imphal Valley.

Scholar Pum Khan Pau notes that, around 1830, when the British established a political agency in Manipur, the area to the south of present-day Manipur (Tonzang and Tedim townships of present-day Chin State) witnessed the rise of a powerful Sukte chieftain called Khan Thuam. Along with his son Kam Hau, he embarked upon a territorial expansion, pushing the less powerful tribes towards the border of Manipur. But many tribesmen also submitted to the Suktes, paid tribute, and participated in the expansion process. This period witnessed many raids from the south on the border of Manipur, which was roughly in line with the southern boundary of the Manipur valley. A popular folk song summarised the position of Khan Thuam:

What I rule extends to Manipur in the north, and ends at Falam in the south;
Manipur to the north and Falam to the south, I am the tiger in the middle.

After Khan Thuam's death, his dominion came to be divided between his elder son Kam Hau, based at Mualpi and the younger son Za Pau, based at Tedim. The combined tribe earned the name "Kamhau-Sukte" and became "one of the most dreaded powers in Manipur, Lushai Hills and the Kale-Kabaw Valley".

The domain of the Kamhau-Sukte tribes extended all the way to the south of the Manipur valley, encompassing major portions of the present-day Churachandpur and Chandel districts, driving the tribes in these districts further north. Their movement threatened the Naga tribes to the north, in particular the Kabuis to the west of the Manipur valley. McCulloch arranged for a line of Kuki settlements to the south of their area to serve as a buffer and armed the settlers. These villages came to be known as "sepoy villages". According to McCulloch, sepoy villages were also set up along the southern frontier of the Manipur valley.

According to modern scholars, the British administrators overemphasized the Kukis' "migration from south", because they had inadequate knowledge of the Kukis already present in the hills of Manipur. In addition, some of the larger tribes such as Thadous are said to have been native to the southern hills (Churachandpur and Chandel districts) that were later added to Manipur territory in the 1890s.

An important landmark in the history of the Kuki people was the arrival of missionaries and the spread of Christianity among them. Missionary activity had considerable social, cultural and political ramifications while the acceptance of Christianity marked a departure from the traditional religion of the Kuki peoples as well as their ancestral customs and traditions. The spread of English education introduced the Kuki people to the "modern era". William Pettigrew, the first foreign missionary, came to Manipur on 6 February 1894 and was sponsored by the American Baptist Mission Union. He, along with Dr. Crozier, worked in the North and the Northeast of Manipur. In the south, Watkins Robert of the Welsh Presbytery mission organised the Indo-Burma Thadou-Kuki Pioneer Mission in 1913. To have a broader scope, the mission's name was changed to North East India General Mission (NEIGM) in 1924.

The first resistance to British hegemony by the Kuki people was the Kuki Rebellion of 1917–19, also known as the Anglo-Kuki War, after which their territory was subjugated by the British. Until their defeat in 1919, the Kukis had been an independent people ruled by their chieftains. The Dobashi, Lengjang Kuki was credited as responsible for preventing the Kukis of the Naga Hills from joining the Kuki Rebellion of Manipur.

During World War II, seeing an opportunity to regain independence, the Kuki fought alongside the Imperial Japanese Army and the Indian National Army led by Subhas Chandra Bose but the success of the Allied forces over the Axis group dashed their hopes.

=== Tripura ===
On 31 January 1860, Kuki Riang led the Kukis of Hill Tippera in raiding the Chhagalnaiya plains (then under the administration of the Twipra Kingdom) which was inhabited by ethnic Bengalis and British officers. The Kukis looted the area of Bakhshganj and murdered Kamal Poddar of Basantpur. They then proceeded to molest Poddar's women until Guna Ghazi and Jakimal waged war against them in the village of Kulapara. Whilst the Kukis abducted 700 women, Munshi Abdul Ali informed the British authorities of the atrocities. 185 Britons were assassinated, 100 of them were kidnapped and the Kukis remained in the plains for one or two days. British troops and policemen were finally despatched from Noakhali, Tipperah (Comilla) and Chittagong to suppress them but the Kukis had already fled to the jungles of the princely state and they never returned to Chhagalnaiya ever again.

=== Post-colonial history ===
The Constitution (Scheduled Tribes) (Part C States) Order, 1951 included "any Kuki tribe", "any Lushai tribe" and "any Naga tribe" as umbrella terms among the scheduled tribes in Assam, Manipur, and Tripura. Among the "any Kuki" classification, it listed 39 subtribes/clans. The 1951 census recorded the Kuki population of Manipur as 69,855, that in Assam as 18,200, (Note: The Assam state of 1951 included the present-day states of Meghalaya, Mizoram and Nagaland.) and that in Tripura as 3,428.

The 21 Kuki tribes of Manipur (as per the nomenclature used in the British colonial times) gathered together in 1948 to form an organisation called Kuki Company. They also contributed to the construction of Kuki Inn in Imphal, to serve as the office for the organisation. Soon afterwards, frictions developed over the use of the Thadou language for the business of the organisation. (Note: The Thadous form the largest Kuki tribe in Manipur, constituting 7.6% of the population in 2011. All the remaining New Kuki tribes together constitute 8.1%, and the Old Kuki tribes constitute 3.6%.) As a result, almost all the tribes other than Thadou Kukis left the Kuki Company, and formed a separate Khulmi National Union. In 1950s, ten Old Kuki tribes changed their affiliation to 'Naga', induced to do so by the Tangkhuls. (Note: The ten tribes are: Anal, Chothe, Koirao, Lamkang, Maring, Moyon, Monsang, Purum and Tarao.) Seven New Kuki tribes eventually adopted the Zomi identity in the 1990s.

In the 1950s, when the Kaka Kalelkar Commission visited Manipur, there was a concerted attempt by the Kuki and Naga tribes to delineate each tribe separately in the Schedule Tribe Order's list. Consequently, in 1956, the umbrella terms such as 'any Kuki' and 'any Naga' were deleted, and 29 tribes of Manipur were listed individually. This revision completely left out other unlisted tribes from the scheduled tribes list. In other states of India, however, the old classification of "any Kuki tribe" remained. In 2003, the term "any Kuki tribes" was re-added to the list in Manipur as well.

== Cultures and traditions ==
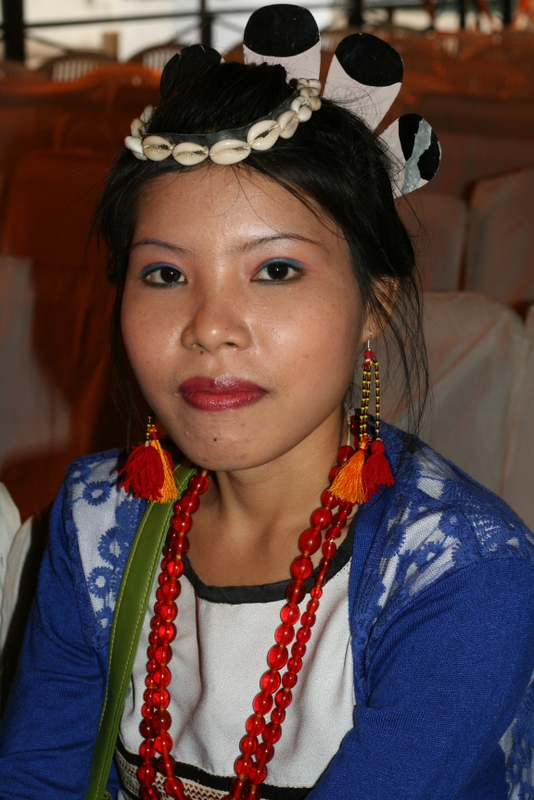
A Kuki woman

The land of the Kukis has a number of customs and traditions.

=== Sawm ===
Sawm, a community centre for boys – was the centre of learning in which the Sawm-upa (an elder) did the teaching, while Sawm-nu took care of chores, such as combing of the boy's hair, washing of the garments and making the beds. The best students were recommended to the King's or the Chief's service, and eventually would achieve the office of Semang and Pachong (ministers) in their courts, or gal –lamkai (leaders, warriors) in the army.

=== Lawm ===
Lawm (a traditional type of youth club) was an institution in which boys and girls engaged in social activities for the benefit of the individual and the community. It was also another learning institution. Every Lawm has a Lawm-upa (a senior member), a To’llai-pao (an overseer or superintendent) and a Lawm-tangvo (assistant superintendent). Besides being a source of traditional learning, the institution of the Lawm also facilitated the transmission of both technical as well as practical knowledge to its members, especially with regard to particular methods of farming, hunting, fishing and sporting activities such as Kung–Kal (high jump, especially over a choice mithun), Ka’ng Ka’p, Ka’ngchoi Ka’p (top game), Suhtumkhawh (javelin throw using the heavy wooden implement for pounding-de-husking-paddy) and So’ngse (shot put).

The Lawm was also a centre where young Kuki people learned discipline and social etiquette. After harvest season, the Lawm meet is celebrated with a Lawm-se’l and, as a commemoration, a pillar is erected. The event is accompanied by dance and drinking rice-beer, which sometimes continues for days and nights.

== Laws and government ==
=== Governance ===
With regard to governance, Semang (cabinet) is the annual assembly of a Kuki village community held at the Chief's residence represents the Inpi (Assembly). In such an assembly, the Chief and his Semang and Pachong (cabinet members and auxiliary of Inpi) and all the household heads of the village congregate to discuss and resolve matters relating to the village and the community.

== Religions ==
Prior to conversion in the early 20th century to Christianity by Welsh Baptist missionaries, the Chin, Kuki, and Mizo peoples were animists; among their practices were ritual headhunting. Christian missionaries entered Manipur in the late 19th century but did not yet make inroads into the tribal areas. The victory of the British in Anglo-Kuki War of 1917–1919 opened up their mind of the Kukis to the Christian God of the British, who was thought of as the victor. This led them to rapidly convert to Christianity. Conversion to Christianity has transformed their ideas, mentality and social practices at the cost of their traditions and customs. The majority of Kukis are now Christians, with most belonging to Protestant denominations, especially Baptist.

Since the late 20th century, some of these peoples have begun following Messianic Judaism. The Bnei Menashe (Hebrew: בני מנשה, "Sons of Menasseh") are a small group within India's North-Eastern border states of Manipur and Mizoram; since the late 20th century, they claim descent from one of the Lost Tribes of Israel and have adopted the practice of Judaism. The Bnei Menashe are made up of Mizo, Kuki and Chin peoples, who all speak Tibeto-Burman languages, and whose ancestors migrated into northeast India from Burma mostly in the 17th and 18th centuries. They are called Chin in Burma. In the late 20th century, an Israeli rabbi investigating their claims named them Bnei Menashe, based on their account of descent from Menasseh. Of the 3.7 million people living in these two northeast states only about 9,000 belong to the Bnei Menashe, several thousands have emigrated to Israel. Some have supported other movements to separate from India.

Due to the close proximity to Muslim-majority Bengal, a Kuki Muslim community has also developed. They are said to be descendants of Kuki men who had married Bengali Muslim women, a relationship requiring the husband to be a Muslim. They are mostly centred around the village of North Chandrapur in the Tripuri city of Udaipur. Notable Kuki Muslims include Khirod Ali Sardar of Chandrapur and Ali Mia of Sonamura. The community has been subject to scorn by other Kukis.

== See also ==
- Zale'n-gam
- Kuki–Paite Conflict
- Kuki–Tamil ethnic clash of 1992
- Kuki–Naga conflict in Manipur
- 2023–2026 Manipur conflict

== Bibliography ==
- Frontier and Overseas Expeditions from India, Vol. 4: North & North-Eastern Frontier Tribes, Intelligence Branch, Army Headquarters, India, 1907 – via archive.org
- Brown, R. (1874), Statistical Account of the Native State of Manipur and the Hill Territory under Its Rule, Calcutta: Office of the Superintendent of Government Printing
- Carey, Bertram S.; Tuck, H. N. (1896), The Chin Hills, Volume I, Government Printing, Burma
- Chongloi, H. (2018), "Reinterpreting Kuki Chieftainship of Northeast India in relation to Colonial Historiography", Media Theory Perspectives. Media Watch, 9 (3): 437–446, doi:10.15655/mw_2018_v9i3_49494, S2CID 199515134
- Dun, E. W. (1992) [1886], Gazetteer of Manipur, Manas Publications – via archive.org
- Go, Khup Za (2008), Zo Chronicles: A Documentary Study of History and Culture of the Kuki-Chin-Lushai Tribe, Mittal Publications, ISBN 9788183242103
- Johnstone, Sir James (1896), My Experiences in Manipur and the Naga Hills, London: Sampson Low, Marston and Company – via archive.org
- Haokip, Doungul Letkhojam (2021), "'Hunger is more Savage than Cannon': Logistics of the Anglo-Kuki War", in Ngamjahao Kipgen; Doungul Letkhojam Haokip (eds.), Against the Empire: Polity, Economy and Culture during the Anglo-Kuki War, 1917–1919, Routledge, pp. 93–117, ISBN 978-1-003-00065-5
- Haokip, Rebecca C. (2007). "The Kuki-Paite Conflict in the Churachandpur District of Manipur". In Lazar Jeyaseelan (ed.). Conflict mapping and peace processes in North East India (PDF). North Eastern Social Research Centre. pp. 185–207. Archived from the original (PDF) on 18 December 2023.
- Haokip, Sielen (2012), "What Price, Twenty Years of Peace in Mizoram (1986–2006): A Kuki Perspective", in Thongkholal Haokip (ed.), The Kukis of Northeast India: Politics and Culture, Bookwell, pp. 89–, ISBN 9789380574448
- Kipgen, Nehginpao (October–December 2011), "Ethnic Conflict in India: A Case Study of the Kukis and the Nagas in Manipur", The Indian Journal of Political Science, 72 (4): 1043–1060, JSTOR 41856539
- Lunminthang, Michael (2016), "Rethinking the Political History of Northeast India: Historical Review on Kuki Country", Indian Historical Review, 43 (1): 63–82, doi:10.1177/0376983616628385
- Mackenzie, Alexander (1884), History of the Relations of the Government with the Hill Tribes of the North-East Frontier of Bengal, Calcutta: Home Department Press – via archive.org
- McCulloch, W. (1859). Account of the Valley of Munnipore and of the Hill Tribes. Selections from the Records of the Government of India (Foreign Department). Calcutta: Bengal Printing Company. OCLC 249105916 – via archive.org.
- Soppitt, C. A. (1887), A Short Account of the Kuki-Lushai Tribes, Shillong: Assam Secretariat Press – via archive.org
- Parratt, Saroj Nalini Arambam (2009). The Court Chronicle of the Kings of Manipur: The Cheitharon Kumpapa, Volume 2. Foundation Books / Cambridge University Press India. ISBN 978-81-7596-854-7.
- Pau, Pum Khan (2019). Indo-Burma Frontier and the Making of the Chin Hills: Empire and Resistance. Taylor & Francis. ISBN 9781000507454.
- Pemberton, Capt. R. Boileau (1835), Report on the Eastern Frontier of British India, Calcutta: Government of India – via archive.org
- Shakespear, J. (1912), The Lushei Kuki Clans, London: MacMillan and Co – via archive.org
- Suan, H. Kham Khan (2011), "Rethinking 'tribe' identities: The politics of recognition among the Zo in north-east India", Contributions to Indian Sociology, 45 (2): 157–187, doi:10.1177/006996671104500201, S2CID 220855274
- Tohring, S. R. (2010), Violence and Identity in North-east India: Naga-Kuki Conflict, Mittal Publications, ISBN 9788183243445
- Vaiphei, Lianboi (2015). "Christian Missionaries and Colonialism in the Hills of Manipur". In Arambam Noni; Kangujam Sanatomba (eds.). Colonialism and Resistance: Society and State in Manipur. Routledge. pp. 183–. doi:10.4324/9781315638317. ISBN 978-1-317-27066-9.
