= List of populated places in Pherzawl district =

Villages in Pherzawl district of Manipur, India

The Pherzawl district of Manipur state in India was carved out of the Churachandpur district in 2016, and comprises 4 subdivisions.

== Subdivisions ==
As of 2022, the Pherzawl district comprises 4 sub-divisions: Pherzawl (non-functional), Thanlon, Parbung-Tipaimukh, and Vangai Range. At the time of the 2011 census, only the Thanlon and Tipaimukh subdivisions existed, as part of the Churachandpur district.

Name	Population	Effective literacy rate	Sex ratio	SC population %	ST population %	Census code (2011)
Tipaimukh	28795	84.29%	997	0.02%	94.53%	01868
Thanlon	18464	75.03%	947	0.07%	98.34%	01869

== Villages ==
=== Vangai Range ===
Name	Population	Effective literacy rate	Sex ratio	SC population %	ST population %	Census code (2011)
Phailienthangpunji	288	79.92%	1028	0%	46.18%	269265
Henchungpunji	668	13.55%	959	0%	38.02%	269266
Saikulphai	221	39.7%	905	0%	95.93%	269267
Doltang	125	98.25%	838	0%	99.2%	269268
Chingmun	221	87.82%	956	0%	98.64%	269269
Tuaitengmun	202	99.46%	1172	0%	100.0%	269270
Suangphumun	147	40.83%	1194	0%	98.64%	269271
Phailien	74	31.94%	897	0%	91.89%	269272
Nungsekpunji	320	85.36%	1013	0%	62.81%	269273
Muolkhangthol	224	82.26%	778	0%	62.5%	269274
Tuisen (Notunlalpani)	657	83.78%	950	0%	70.17%	269275
Buangmun	254	66.8%	954	0%	100.0%	269276
Jakrador-Phaimuol	154	66.0%	1081	0%	94.16%	269277
Savomphai	442	81.08%	1028	0%	99.1%	269278
P. Munlian	42	100.0%	909	0%	97.62%	269279
P. Munte	63	80.7%	909	0%	98.41%	269280
Ankhasuo (Sibapurikhal)	1841	89.33%	954	0.16%	91.69%	269281
Kasurbali	118	95.0%	844	0%	4.24%	269282
Lower Kharkhuplien	600	75.89%	948	0%	96.17%	269283
Kh. Jaikhan	287	87.34%	1126	0%	94.08%	269284
Kangreng	1795	94.81%	1021	0%	99.16%	269286
Thingkal	444	92.51%	783	0%	97.75%	269287
Ngampabung	565	98.31%	883	0%	97.17%	269288
Tuolbung	635	93.45%	966	0.16%	96.69%	269289
Tieulien	290	83.0%	1231	0%	99.31%	269290
Patpuihmun	1929	76.55%	929	0%	98.39%	269291
Sartuinek	707	96.98%	992	0%	99.72%	269297

The district website (2022) lists the following additional villages, which were not part of the 2011 census directory.

- Henchungpunji Muslim
- Jeisuo
- Kangrengdhor
- Khangbor
- Moinador (Hmarkhothar)
- Phulpui
- Thingkaldhor
- Upper Kharkhuplien

=== Thanlon block ===
Name	Population	Effective literacy rate	Sex ratio	SC population %	ST population %	Census code (2011)
Paikholum (Phaikholum / J. Muntha)	467	94.81%	810	0%	99.57%	269305
Phaijang	126	87.27%	1172	0%	100.0%	269306
Pangen	284	66.81%	945	0%	99.65%	269307
Thenzol	219	43.93%	1047	0%	99.54%	269308
Suangsang	1047	51.29%	1002	0%	99.81%	269309
Savaipaih	79	84.29%	1194	0%	98.73%	269310
Khoken	360	88.63%	885	0%	99.72%	269311
Dailon	234	99.54%	918	0%	98.72%	269312
Milongmun	136	89.57%	1159	0%	100.0%	269313
Khuangjang	208	85.98%	748	0%	100.0%	269314
Gamhui	168	79.73%	1211	0%	99.4%	269315
Galkapkot	140	75.0%	842	0%	100.0%	269316
Leijangphai	801	37.23%	912	0%	99.38%	269317
Tallian	140	24.77%	1188	0%	99.29%	269318
Bungjang	22	46.15%	692	0%	100.0%	269319
Suangpekmun	219	86.17%	888	0%	99.54%	269320
Thanlon	1352	89.91%	707	0.96%	82.99%	269321
Dialkhai	107	81.11%	1184	0%	100.0%	269322
Joutung	398	83.04%	980	0%	99.75%	269323
Mualpheng	240	77.17%	983	0%	100.0%	269324
Sumtuh (Sumtuk)	322	86.81%	1091	0%	99.69%	269325
Bukpi	1355	79.75%	1016	0%	99.04%	269326
Palkhuang	329	91.67%	935	0%	100.0%	269327
Hanship	632	90.49%	994	0%	100.0%	269328
Aibulon	406	81.08%	980	0%	98.77%	269329
Phaitong	331	87.08%	994	0%	100.0%	269330

The district website (2022) lists the following additional villages, which were not part of the 2011 census directory.

- Bungpilon
- Buolmuol
- C.Zalen
- Khajang
- Mongon
- Muikot
- New Muntha
- Pamjal
- Phainuam
- Sainoujang
- Saite
- Suohthumphai
- T. Maojang
- T. Phaikholum
- Tangnuom
- Tongkham
- Tuikumuallum
- Tuipiphai
- Vaipheimuol
- Zoupi

=== Tipaimukh block ===
Name	Population	Effective literacy rate	Sex ratio	SC population %	ST population %	Census code (2011)
Taithu	1173	92.28%	1009	0%	98.12%	269292
Damdei	682	95.88%	943	0%	98.83%	269293
Tinsuong	961	42.95%	1067	0%	99.69%	269294
Loibuol	41	92.11%	864	0%	100.0%	269295
Pherzawl	1558	85.75%	905	0%	99.04%	269296
Parbung	2545	88.74%	1031	0.04%	99.29%	269298
Lungthulien	1714	77.21%	1002	0%	99.01%	269299
Sipuikawn	771	93.14%	1425	0%	99.74%	269300
Leisen	1117	95.75%	1084	0%	99.37%	269301
Rovakot	480	97.77%	890	0%	98.33%	269302
Senvon	3136	94.01%	1048	0%	98.34%	269303
Parvachawm	1026	84.27%	1004	0%	98.73%	269304
Thingpan	278	95.67%	866	0%	98.92%	269285

The district website (2022) lists the following additional villages, which were not part of the 2011 census directory.

- H. Maulien
- Serhmun
- Tallan
- Tuolbung
