= Pughoboto =

- Town
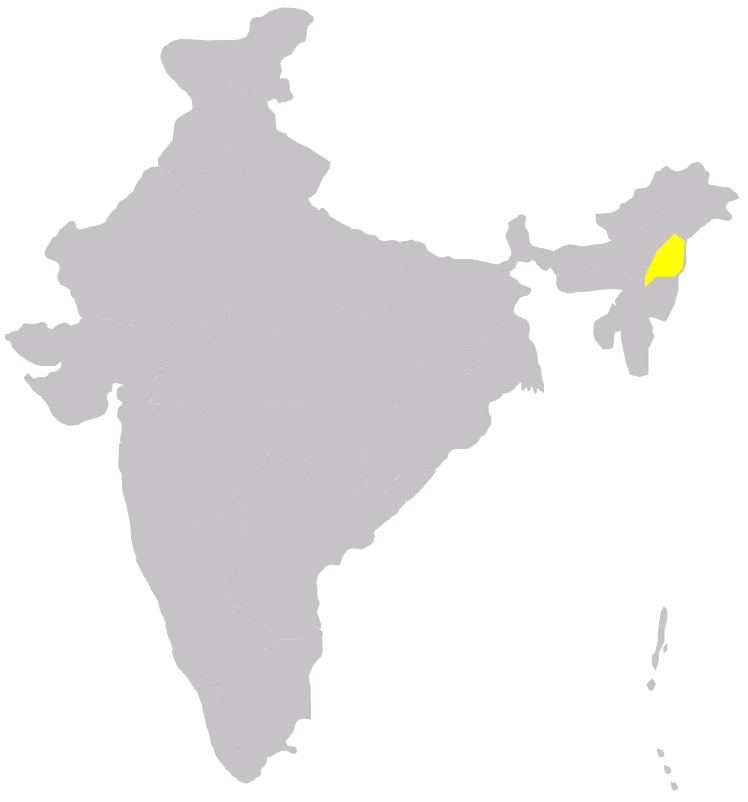
- Pughoboto in Zünheboto

- Location of Pughoboto in North-East India
- Coordinates: 25.97°N 94.52°E
- Country: India
- State: Nagaland
- District: Zünheboto
- Established: 1970

Area
  - Total: 18 km^{2} (6.9 sq mi)
- Elevation: 1,352 m (4,436 ft)

Population (2011)
  - Total: 12,477
  - Density: 200/km^{2} (520/sq mi)

Languages
  - Official: English
- Time zone: UTC+5:30 (IST)
- Postal code: 798619
- Vehicle registration: NL-06
- Website: http://Zunheboto.nic.in

Pughoboto (Pron:/ˌzʌnˈhiːbəʊtəʊ/) is a town and a town area committee in the Zünheboto District of the Indian state of Nagaland.

It is one of the oldest subdivisions in Nagaland, India. The Sümi Nagas originated from Pughoboto. Christianity in the Sümi region first arrived at Ighanumi village.

== Demographics ==
As of the 2011 India census, Pughoboto had a population of 12,477. Males made up 53% of the population and females 47%. Pughoboto had an average literacy rate of 85%, with male literacy at 81% and female literacy at 77%. In Pughoboto, 9% of the population was under 6 years of age.

== Climate ==
The average climatic temperature in Pughoboto, India is 27.7°C (81.86°F).

== See also ==
- Zünheboto
- Sümi Naga
- Zunheboto district
- Aghunato
- Satakha
- Akuluto
