= Tipaimukh Dam =

Dam in Sipuikawn, Manipur, India

- Location within Manipur Location within India
- Country: India
- Location: Sipuikawn(Tipaimukh)
- Coordinates: 24°14′05″N 93°01′13″E
- Status: Planned

Dam and spillways
- Type of dam: rock-filled, earthern
- Impounds: Barak River
- Height: 162.8 m (534 ft)
- Length: 390 m (1,280 ft)
- Elevation at crest: 180 m (590 ft)

Reservoir
- Total capacity: 15.9 km^{3} (3.8 cu mi)
- Surface area: 291.5 km^{2} (112.5 sq mi)
- Maximum water depth: 1,725.5 m (5,661 ft)
- Normal elevation: 178 m (584 ft)

Power Station
- Operator: NHPC Limited
- Turbines: 6 x 250 MW Francis-type
- Installed capacity: 1,500 MW

Tipaimukh Dam, officially "Tipaimukh Multipurpose Hydroelectric Dam Project", is a proposed dam on the Barak River at Sipuikawn (Tipaimukh) in Manipur, India. The purpose of the dam is flood control and hydroelectric power generation. The project was approved by the Government of India in 1999 and entrusted to the North Eastern Electric Power Corporation Limited, later switched to NHPC Limited. Due to environmental concerns as well as concerns in Bangladesh over downstream effects, the project remains under discussion and no construction has yet taken place.

== History ==
The idea of a dam on the Barak River for flood control in the Cachar plains was first aired under the British Raj in 1926. A barrage on the Barak River was discussed in the first meeting of India–Bangladesh Joint Rivers commission in 1972. Bangladesh is said to have agreed with the idea and proposed some modifications in 1974. Tipaimukh was chosen as the location of the dam at this time. Discussions continued till 1981, when India presented detailed explorations and investigations on the Tipaimukh Dam. Bangladesh's participation is said to have been patchy. In 1999, the Government of India approved a 163 metre-high dam as a multi-purpose project to serve the needs of flood control as well as hydro-electric power generation. The North Eastern Electric Power Corporation Limited (NEEPCO) was initially entrusted with the project. NEEPCO carried out an environmental impact assessment in 2006–2007. The project was later switched to NHPC Limited and a joint venture company owned by NHPC, the Government of Manipur and Sutlej Jal Vidyut Nigam Limited was agreed in 2011. Bangladesh raised serious concerns at this time, and the project has been under discussion between the two countries since then.

== Description ==
=== Location ===
The project is envisaged to be built on the Barak River, which originates in northern Manipur and flows southwest till Tipaimukh in the present-day Pherzawl district. At Tipaimukh, the Tuivai River joins Barak from south. The dam site is 500 metres downstream from the point of confluence. After Tipaimukh, the Barak River flows north till Jirimukh, where it turns west into Assam. The Tuivai River and the north-flowing section of the Barak River form the border with the state of Mizoram. According to the 2007 environmental impact assessment, 275.5 km^{2} (106.4 sq mi) area in Manipur and 16 km^{2} (6.2 sq mi) area in Mizoram will be submerged under the reservoir created by the dam.

=== Technical features ===
The dam is planned to be 390m long and 162.8 m. high, from a base of 18 m. above mean sea level. The dam's crest elevation will be at an altitude of about 180 m. above mean sea level, with a maximum reservoir level of 178 m. and full reservoir level 175 m.

The hydroelectric power generation will have an installation capacity of 1500 MW, supplied by six 250 MW Francis turbine-generators.

== Impact ==
=== Upstream impact ===
According to the 2007 environmental impact assessment report, the reservoir formed by the dam would submerge 291.5 km^{2} (112.5 sq mi) area at full reservoir level, with 275.5 km^{2} (106.4 sq mi) in Manipur and 16 km^{2} (6.2 sq mi) in Mizoram. Independent estimates assessed 311 km^{2} (120 sq mi) area of submergence. Of this, 229.11 km^{2} (88.46 sq mi) area is said to be reserved forest and 81.89 km^{2} (31.62 sq mi) area is agricultural and settlement land.

The Environmental Impact Assessment (EIA) report prepared by the Agricultural Finance Corporation in 2007 calculated that 12 small villages would be submerged under the reservoir, containing 313 households and 2,027 persons. (Note: However, the report listed 14 villages in the Annexure, viz., Saleng, Darlawn, New Vervek, Sailutar, Sakawrdai, Khawlek, Vaitin, Vanbawng, Khawpuar, Suangpuilawn, Ratu, Phullen, North-East Tlangnuam, and Lungsum.) Independent estimates stated that 90 villages with 1310 families would be affected.

The area is populated by Hmar people, who are a section of the Kuki-Zo people and a Scheduled Tribe in Manipur. Zeliangrong Nagas inhabiting the Noney and Tamenglong districts may also be affected. Both the groups have opposed the project stating that it would submerge their shifting cultivation (jhum) fields, wet rice fields, forest and riverine habitats, and that it would destroy their way of life.

=== Downstream impact ===
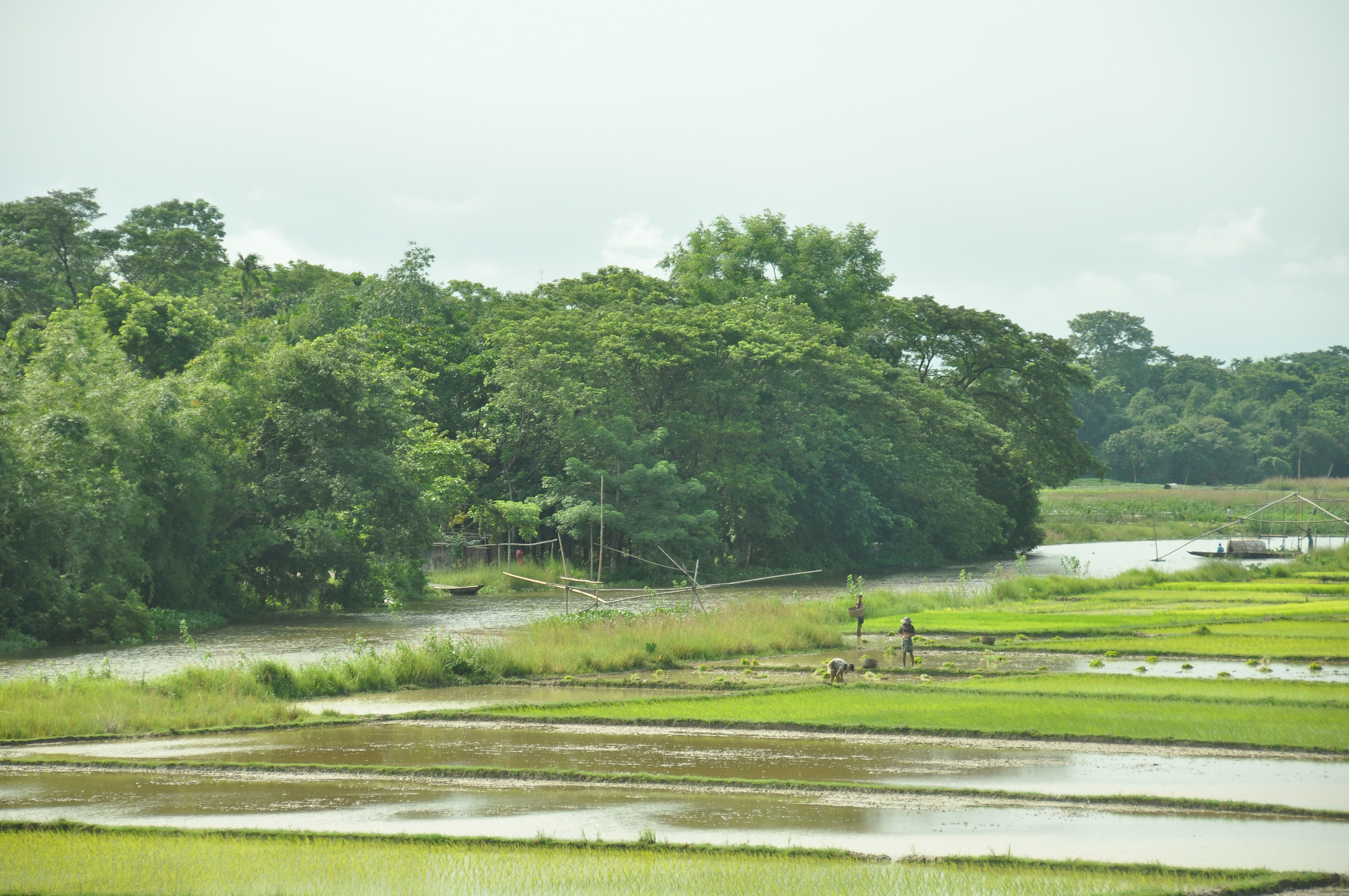
Dry season cultivation in a Bangladeshi haor

The Barak River is a trans-boundary river between India and Bangladesh. Soon after entering Bangladesh, it splits into Surma River and Kushiyara River, which merge again into the Meghna River before joining the Ganges Delta. The entire river system is often referred to as the "Barak-Meghna River System".

The Surma and Kushiyara rivers water seasonal wetlands called haors in Bangladesh. During the monsoon period, the haors turn into lakes, but during the dry period (in winter) the water recedes and rice is cultivated. A major part of Bangladesh's 373 haors fall in the four districts of the Sylhet Division in the Upper Meghna basin. The best known among them, Tanguar Haor, sustains 100 villages with 60,000 people.

There are concerns in Bangladesh that, by changing the river flow pattern, the Tipaimukh Dam would affect the ecological features and the cultivation patterns of the area. It is believed that the dam would lead to early submergence and delayed draining of the haors, reducing the possible cultivation period.

Jaya Thakur of Observer Research Foundation states that the main concern appears to be the fear of losing the source of water for wetland irrigation during the dry season. This would also be the period when the dam would have to close its gates for an extended period for the sake of power production. However, she finds that, according to Bangladesh's Water Resources data, the upstream portion of the Barak River above the Tipaimukh Dam contributes only 19 percent of the water to the wetland area during the dry season. The bulk of the water is contributed by the downstream portion of the Barak River and other streams flowing down from Meghalaya. Thus the impact of the dam over Bangladesh's wetland cultivation would not be significant.

Bangladesh also worries that the dam is in a seismically active area. In the event of an earthquake that might damage the dam, densely populated cities in Bangladesh could be swamped under water within hours.

== Controversies ==
Bangladeshi experts have said the massive dam will disrupt the seasonal rhythm of the river and have an adverse effect on downstream agriculture and fisheries. The government of Bangladesh has decided to send an expert team to the dam area to examine the features and likely impact of the dam on the flow of water into the Surma and the Kushiyara.

In 2013, the two governments announced up to a 2-year delay, to allow Bangladesh to complete additional environmental studies.

== Bibliography ==
- Arora, Vibha; Kipgen, Ngamjahao (January–April 2012), "'We can live without power, but we can't live without our land': Indigenous Hmar Oppose the Tipaimukh Dam in Manipur", Sociological Bulletin, 61 (1): 109–128, doi:10.1177/0038022920120105, S2CID 168677507
- Islam, Md Saidul; Islam, Md Nazrul (2016), ""Environmentalism of the poor": the Tipaimukh Dam, ecological disasters and environmental resistance beyond borders", Bandung Journal of Global South, 3 (27): 1–16, doi:10.1186/s40728-016-0030-5
- Islam, S. Nazrul (2020), Rivers and Sustainable Development: Alternative Approaches and Their Implications, Oxford University Press, ISBN 9780190079024
- Thakur, Jaya (January 2020), India-Bangladesh Trans-Boundary River Management: Understanding the Tipaimukh Dam Controversy, Observer Research Foundation
