= National Highway 2 (India) =

National highway in India

National Highway 2
- Map of the National Highway in red
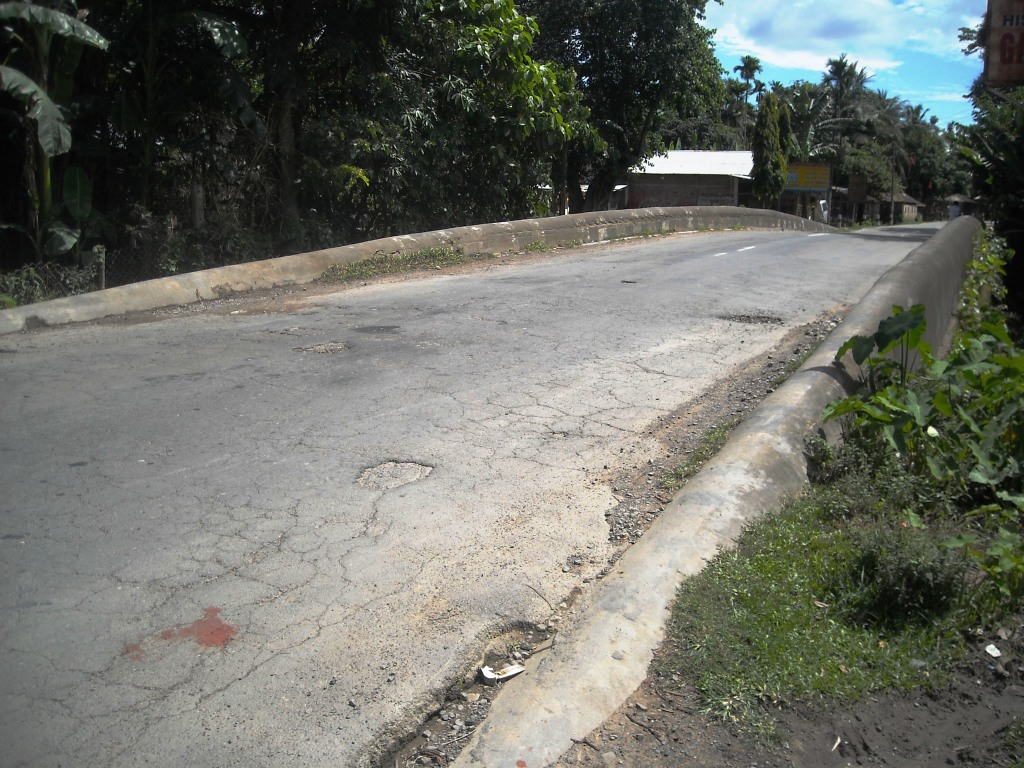
- Namdang Stone Bridge built in 1703 carries NH-2

Route information
- Part of AH1 AH2
- Maintained by NHAI
- Length: 1,325.6 km (823.7 mi)

Major junctions
- North end: NH 15 in Dibrugarh
- NH 202 in Mokokchung; NH 202 in Imphal; NH 502A in Lawngtlai
- South end: Tuipang

Location
- Country: India
- States: Assam, Nagaland, Manipur, Mizoram
- Primary destinations: Sivasagar, Jhanji, Amguri, Mokokchung, Wokha, Kohima, Imphal, Churachandpur, Sasaram, Seling, Serchhip, Lawngtlai

Highway system
- Roads in India; Expressways; National; State; Asian
← NH 701A	→ NH 102

National Highway 2 is a national highway in India that runs from Dibrugarh in Assam to Tuipang in Mizoram. This national highway passes through the Indian states of Assam, Nagaland, Manipur and Mizoram. This national highway is 1,325.6 km (823.7 mi) long. Before renumbering of national highways, NH-2 was variously numbered as old national highways 37, 61, 39, 150 and 54.

== Route description ==
NH2 connects Dibrugarh, Sivasagar, Amguri, Mokokchung, Wokha, Kohima, Kangpokpi, Imphal, Churachandpur, Sipuikawn, Seling, Serchhip, Lawngtlai and Tuipang.

The section of the road from Imphal to Aizawl was formerly numbered National Highway 150. The stretch from Imphal to Churachandpur is part of the "Tedim Road" constructed during the British Raj, and the stretch from Churachandpur to Sipuikawn is called "Tipaimukh Road".

== Major intersections ==
NH 15 Terminal near Dibrugarh.
NH 215 near Moranhat
NH 702C near Sivasagar
NH 715 near Jhanji.
NH 702 near Chantongia.
NH 702D near Mokokchung.
NH 202 near Mokokchung
NH 702A near Mokokchung
NH 29 near Kohima
NH 102A near Tadubi
NH 129A near Maram
NH 202 near Imphal
NH 102 near Imphal
NH 37 near Imphal
NH 137A near Imphal
NH 102B near Churachandpur
NH 306A near Vertek
NH 6 near Seling
NH 302 near Theriat
NH 502A near Lawngtlai
NH 502 near Venus Saddle

== Asian Highways ==
Imphal to Kohima stretch of National Highway 2 is part of Asian Highway 1 and Asian Highway 2.

== See also ==
- List of national highways in India
- List of national highways in India by state
