= National Highway 150 (India, old numbering) =

Road in India

National Highway 150

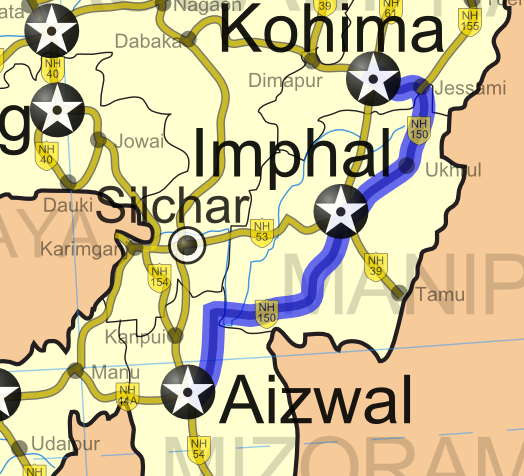

Route information
- Length: 700 km (430 mi)

Major junctions
- From: Seling, Mizoram
- To: Kohima, Nagaland

Location
- Country: India
- States: Manipur: 523 km (325 mi); Mizoram: 141 km (88 mi); Nagaland: 36 km (22 mi)
- Primary destinations: Churachandpur – Imphal – Ukhrul – Jessami

Highway system
- Roads in India; Expressways; National; State; Asian
| ← NH 125 | → NH 151 |

The National Highway 150, or NH-150, in India runs between the towns of Kohima in Nagaland and Aizwal in Mizoram, passing through the state of Manipur. In Manipur, it passes through the capital city Imphal, Bishnupur, Churachandpur, and Tipaimukh. In the newnumbering, the Imphal–Aizal section of the road is part of National Highway 2, and the Kohima–Imphal section is part of National Highway 202.

== National Highway 150 ==
The Central Government of India declared Tipaimukh Road, a State Highway in Manipur, a National Highway (NH 150) on 6 January 1999. The total length of this highway is 700 km, and is the third National Highway passing through the state of Manipur, together with old NH 53 and old NH 39. This highway has been proposed to connect three bordering states in Northeast India, viz. Mizoram (141 km), Manipur (523 km) and Nagaland (36 km). The highway stretch starts from Seling (NH 54) in Mizoram through Tipaimukh-Imphal-Ukhrul-Jessami in Manipur and terminates at a junction with NH-53 in Nagaland (km 0 at Kohima).

== Repairs and Construction ==
The development of this National Highway had been projected to be under the "Prime Minister’s agenda for socio-economic development of North Eastern Region" which was announced in January 2000. The PM's agenda envisages a total investment of Rs. 91 billion. It comprises 27 projects ranging from rural infrastructure development projects, irrigation and educational infrastructure development to strengthening of internal security, besides horticulture and IT development etc.

It has also been reported that the entire stretch of National Highway-150 will be a double lane highway and included in the approved 10th plan programme of the Ministry of Road Transport and Highways.

In August 2004, Union Minister of Shipping, Road Transport and Highways, Shri T.R. Baalu met the Northeast states respective ministers-in-charge, ministry and BRO officials and approved fresh proposals worth Rs. 65 billion for fast track development of nearly 2,000 km National Highways and Roads in the Northeast. During the meeting, it was also decided to provide medians on NH-150 for increasing safety.

== Implementing agency ==
The Border Roads Organisation (BRO) has been entrusted for taking up improvement and construction work of the 262 km long stretch from Tipaimukh to Churachandpur and 175 km from Yaingangpokpi (488 km) to Jessami (63 km). The stretch from Churachandpur to Yaingangpokpi, a total of 86 km is entrusted to the Manipur state Public Work Department (PWD).

== Delays in construction ==
In spite of the Tipaimukh Road been declared a National Highway, no visible construction and maintenance work with the highway has been carried out for the last more than ten years. Project work at this significant route has been abandoned since. The road constructors left the then Tipaimukh Road in 1987. This negligence on the part of the state and central government to improve the only transportation route for the Tipaimukh people in Manipur has taken its toll. The unconcern policy adopted by the government has adversely affected socio-economic livelihood of the remote villages in terms of being unable to market their forest products and buying of their essential commodity needs. This alienation affected not only the road project but also the overall development of the region. Thus, resulting in the region been completely cut off from other parts of the state and the pitiable condition of the people getting more worsened each year.

== Current condition of the road ==
Even before the highway was declared a National Highway, it normally took around a day to travel to or from the Tipaimukh to the district town of Churachandpur which is around 270 km. Then, regular state buses plied from Churachandpur town to Tipaimukh on daily basis and people, goods and news reached Tipaimukh in a day. But the road remained disused for a prolonged period due to establishment of United National Liberation Front training camps. Nearly all movement of vehicles stopped and no Government representative could visit the area beyond Bungmual village. In 2005, Indian army launched an operation and cleared the entire region of militant groups and the development has since then started by Border Roads Task Force (BRTF), an Indian army Road construction task force. Currently, starting from Churachandpur, up to 50 km stone the road is nearly complete. Considerable vehicles have started plying and the state of development in the region is also undergoing a major change.

== Security issues ==
According to the state government, the reconstruction and upgrading work of National Highway-150 had been stalled due to security related issues faced by the implementing agencies from various insurgent groups who actively operate in the area. In regard to the security issue, the Central government said that the law and order situation inside the state is the responsibility of the state government and so the financial requirement for security protection to the implementing agencies should be borne from the state's budget. But the state government insisted that it cannot by itself meet the huge financial demands of the security protection. A number of high level meetings have also been held between the state and central government to address this issue. The Ministry of Home Affairs has been reported to even intimidate that the required security will be provided to the Manipur government so as to facilitate improvement and widening of the Highway expeditiously.

== Recent progress ==
Manipur CM Ibobi Singh, while addressing the Assembly on 5 July 2005 during a discussion on the indefinite highway blockade on NH-39 called by the All Naga Students Association of Manipur (ANSAM), stated that the NH 150 was being developed as an alternative supply line against the backdrop of frequent bandhs and blockade called by different organisations and that it will be completed within the financial year. The 42 days long economic blockade on NH-39 in 2005 prompted the Manipur cabinet to approve the construction of NH-150 bypass to Jiribam via Taithu on 16 August 2005 which is to be done jointly by the state government and the BRO. In the ensuing weeks, 25 Border Roads Task Force (BRTF) stationed at Imphal were said to be entrusted with the task of constructing NH-150 from Churachandpur. The deadline for the completion of the construction of 20 km stretch of road from Churachandpur was set to March 2006. In 2005, Manipur CS Jarnail Singh was summoned by the centre and a meeting was reportedly held on 17 October 2006 with regards to the construction of NH-150.

In his address at the Manipur Assembly on 22 February 2006, the Governor said that the improvement of NH-150 from Churachandpur to Yaingangpokpi is in good progress. He also stated that the BRTF has also started improvement of NH-150 to Tipaimukh in Churachandpur district. The CM of Manipur on his tour to Thanlon and Tipaimukh areas on 3 April 2006 assured the villagers that the repair work on NH-150 connecting Imphal to Aizawl would be taken up very soon. Manipur Governor SS Sidhu on his visit to the areas on 10 March 2006 also said that work on NH-150 will be taken up very soon and will be made motorable by the end of 2006.

== Route ==
- Churachandpur
- Imphal
- Ukhrul
- Jessami

== See also ==
- List of national highways in India
- National Highways Development Project
