= National Highway 6 (India) =

National highway in India

National Highway 6
- Map of National Highway 6 in red
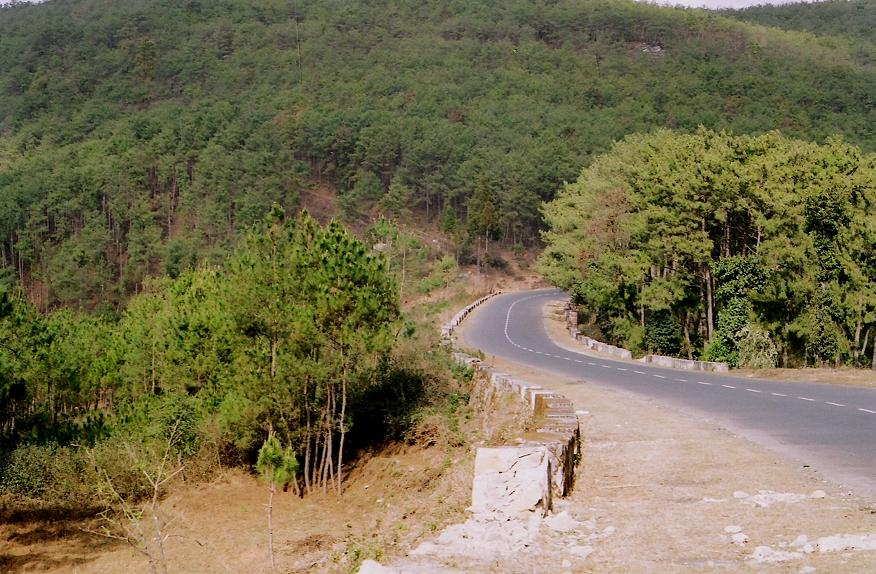
- NH 6 in Meghalaya

Route information
- Part of AH1 AH2
- Length: 667 km (414 mi)

Major junctions
- North end: Jorabat
- South end: Zokhawthar India/Myanmar border

Location
- Country: India
- States: Meghalaya, Assam, Mizoram

Highway system
- Roads in India; Expressways; National; State; Asian
| ← NH 27 | → NH 2 |

National Highway 6, commonly referred to as NH 6, is a primary national highway in India. The highway passes through the Indian states of Meghalaya, Assam, and Mizoram. Before renumbering of national highways NH-6 was variously numbered as old national highways 40, 44, 154 & 54.

== Route ==
NH6 links Jorabat, Shillong, Jowai, Badarpur, Panchgram, Kolasib, Kawnpui, Aizawl, Seling, Lumtui, Khawthlir, Tuisen, Neihdawn, Champhai and terminates near Zokhawthar at India/Myanmar border. In sept 2008, a 120 meter long tunnel was built at Sonapur in Meghalaya inside the Narpuh Sanctuary northwest of Silchar, it connects Meghalaya with Assam's Barak Valley in Meghalaya's southeast.

== Junctions ==
NH 27 Terminal near Jorabat.
NH 106 near Shillong
NH 206 near Jowai
NH 306 near Kolasib.
NH 108 near Aizawl.
NH 2 near Selling.
NH 102B near Kawlkulh

== Asian Highways ==
Jorabat to Shillong stretch of National Highway 6 is part of Asian Highway 1 and Asian Highway 2.

== See also ==
- List of national highways in India
- List of national highways in India by state
