= National Highway 306A (India) =

National highway in India

National Highway 306A
- Map of National Highway 306A in red

Route information
- Auxiliary route of NH 6
- Length: 60 km (37 mi)

Major junctions
- North end: Vairengte
- South end: New Vertek, Mizoram

Location
- Country: India
- States: Mizoram

Highway system
- Roads in India; Expressways; National; State; Asian
← NH 306	→ NH 2

National Highway 306A, commonly called NH 306A is a national highway in India. It is a spur road of National Highway 306. NH-306A traverses the state of Mizoram in India.

== Route ==
Vairengte, Saiphai, Zonmun, New Vertek.

== Junctions ==
NH 306 Terminal near Vairengte.
NH 2 Terminal near New Vertek.

== See also ==
- List of national highways in India
- List of national highways in India by state
