= Aghunato Assembly constituency =

Legislative Assembly constituency in Nagaland State, India

Coordinates: 25.95°N 94.61°E

Aghunato
- Constituency No. 34 for the Nagaland Legislative Assembly

Constituency details
- Country: India
- Region: Northeast India
- State: Nagaland
- District: Zünheboto
- Lok Sabha constituency: Nagaland
- Established: 1964
- Total electors: 16,040
- Reservation: ST

Member of Legislative Assembly
- 14th Nagaland Legislative Assembly
- Incumbent G. Ikuto Zhimomi
- Party: NPF
- Alliance: NDA
- Elected year: 2023

Aghunato is one of the 60 Legislative Assembly constituencies of Nagaland state in India.

It is part of Zünheboto district and is reserved for candidates belonging to the Scheduled Tribes. As of 2023 it is represented by G. Ikuto Zhimomi of the Naga People's Front.

== Members of the Legislative Assembly ==
Year	Member	Party
1964	Iheze Sema	Independent politician
1969	Iheze Sema	Nagaland Nationalist Organisation
1974	Iheze Sema	Nagaland Nationalist Organisation
1977	Kihoto	United Democratic Alliance
1982	Kineto Hollehon	Indian National Congress
1987	K. Kihoto Hollohon	Indian National Congress
1989	Pukhayi	Indian National Congress
1993	Tokheho Yepthomi	Indian National Congress
1998	Tokheho Yepthomi	Indian National Congress
2003	Tokheho Yepthomi	Indian National Congress
2008	Tokheho Yepthomi	Indian National Congress
2013	Pukhayi	Naga People's Front
2018	Pukhayi	Nationalist Democratic Progressive Party
2023	G. Ikuto Zhimomi	Nationalist Democratic Progressive Party

== Election results ==
=== 2023 Assembly election ===
2023 Nagaland Legislative Assembly election: Aghunato
Party	Candidate	Votes	%	±%
NDPP	G. Ikuto Zhimomi	7,133	52.04%	−3.93%
LJP(RV)	Hukiye N. Tissica	6,541	47.72%	
NOTA	Nota	32	0.23%	
Margin of victory		592	4.32%	−8.11%
Turnout		13,706	85.45%	8.63%
Registered electors		16,040		7.79%
NDPP hold		Swing	-3.93%	

=== 2018 Assembly election ===
2018 Nagaland Legislative Assembly election: Aghunato
Party	Candidate	Votes	%	±%
NDPP	Pukhayi	6,399	55.97%	
NPF	Hukiye N. Tissica	4,978	43.54%	−9.33%
NOTA	None of the Above	55	0.48%	
Margin of victory		1,421	12.43%	6.60%
Turnout		11,432	76.82%	−11.52%
Registered electors		14,881		0.70%
NDPP gain from NPF		Swing	3.10%	

=== 2013 Assembly election ===
2013 Nagaland Legislative Assembly election: Aghunato
Party	Candidate	Votes	%	±%
NPF	Pukhayi	6,902	52.87%	5.12%
INC	Hukiye N. Tissica	6,141	47.04%	−6.64%
Margin of victory		761	5.83%	−0.11%
Turnout		13,054	88.34%	−0.57%
Registered electors		14,777		0.80%
NPF gain from INC		Swing	-0.81%	

=== 2008 Assembly election ===
2008 Nagaland Legislative Assembly election: Aghunato
Party	Candidate	Votes	%	±%
INC	Tokheho Yepthomi	6,997	53.69%	−0.87%
NPF	Pukhayi	6,223	47.75%	
Margin of victory		774	5.94%	−3.50%
Turnout		13,033	90.18%	11.81%
Registered electors		14,659		41.33%
INC hold		Swing	-0.87%	

=== 2003 Assembly election ===
2003 Nagaland Legislative Assembly election: Aghunato
Party	Candidate	Votes	%	±%
INC	Tokheho Yepthomi	4,363	54.56%	
NDM	Pukhayi	3,608	45.12%	
Margin of victory		755	9.44%	
Turnout		7,997	77.10%	77.10%
Registered electors		10,372		5.19%
INC hold		Swing	-0.28%	

=== 1998 Assembly election ===
1998 Nagaland Legislative Assembly election: Aghunato
Party	Candidate	Votes	%	±%
INC	Tokheho Yepthomi	Unopposed		
Registered electors		9,860		20.94%
INC hold		Swing		

=== 1993 Assembly election ===
1993 Nagaland Legislative Assembly election: Aghunato
Party	Candidate	Votes	%	±%
INC	Tokheho Yepthomi	3,885	54.83%	0.85%
NPF	Tohevi	3,200	45.17%	−0.85%
Margin of victory		685	9.67%	1.71%
Turnout		7,085	87.56%	−0.82%
Registered electors		8,153		38.68%
INC hold		Swing	0.85%	

=== 1989 Assembly election ===
1989 Nagaland Legislative Assembly election: Aghunato
Party	Candidate	Votes	%	±%
INC	Pukhayi	2,780	53.98%	19.15%
NPF	Nihokhe	2,370	46.02%	
Margin of victory		410	7.96%	4.71%
Turnout		5,150	88.38%	−4.17%
Registered electors		5,879		0.00%
INC hold		Swing	19.15%	

=== 1987 Assembly election ===
1987 Nagaland Legislative Assembly election: Aghunato
Party	Candidate	Votes	%	±%
INC	K. Kihoto Hollohon	1,872	34.83%	0.36%
NND	Nihokhe	1,697	31.57%	10.72%
Independent	Pukhayi	1,175	21.86%	
NPP	Kakiya	631	11.74%	
Margin of victory		175	3.26%	−7.83%
Turnout		5,375	92.55%	3.26%
Registered electors		5,879		−9.94%
INC hold		Swing	0.36%	

=== 1982 Assembly election ===
1982 Nagaland Legislative Assembly election: Aghunato
Party	Candidate	Votes	%	±%
INC	K. Kihoto Hollohon	1,980	34.46%	21.61%
Independent	Akato	1,343	23.38%	
Independent	Khazhe Zhimoni	1,224	21.31%	
NND	Nihakha	1,198	20.85%	
Margin of victory		637	11.09%	−18.02%
Turnout		5,745	89.29%	0.86%
Registered electors		6,528		−5.95%
INC gain from UDA		Swing	-23.66%	

=== 1977 Assembly election ===
1977 Nagaland Legislative Assembly election: Aghunato
Party	Candidate	Votes	%	±%
UDA	K. Kihoto Hollohon	3,509	58.12%	
NCN	Shetovi	1,752	29.02%	
INC	Khehoto	776	12.85%	
Margin of victory		1,757	29.10%	4.02%
Turnout		6,037	88.43%	3.65%
Registered electors		6,941		13.71%
UDA gain from NNO		Swing	-4.41%	

=== 1974 Assembly election ===
1974 Nagaland Legislative Assembly election: Aghunato
Party	Candidate	Votes	%	±%
NNO	Iheze Sema	3,137	62.54%	−7.50%
Independent	Visheto Sema	1,879	37.46%	
Margin of victory		1,258	25.08%	−20.85%
Turnout		5,016	84.78%	10.70%
Registered electors		6,104		23.81%
NNO hold		Swing	-7.50%	

=== 1969 Assembly election ===
1969 Nagaland Legislative Assembly election: Aghunato
Party	Candidate	Votes	%	±%
NNO	Iheze Sema	2,544	70.04%	
Independent	K. Hukato Yepdihomi	876	24.12%	
Independent	Avito Sema	212	5.84%	
Margin of victory		1,668	45.93%	
Turnout		3,632	74.08%	74.08%
Registered electors		4,930		18.80%
NNO gain from Independent		Swing		

=== 1964 Assembly election ===
1964 Nagaland Legislative Assembly election: Aghunato
Party	Candidate	Votes	%	±%
Independent	Iheze Sema	Unopposed		
Registered electors		4,150		
Independent win (new seat)				

== See also ==
- List of constituencies of the Nagaland Legislative Assembly
- Zunheboto district
