= Sipuikawn =

Sipuikawn Hmarkhawpui
- Village
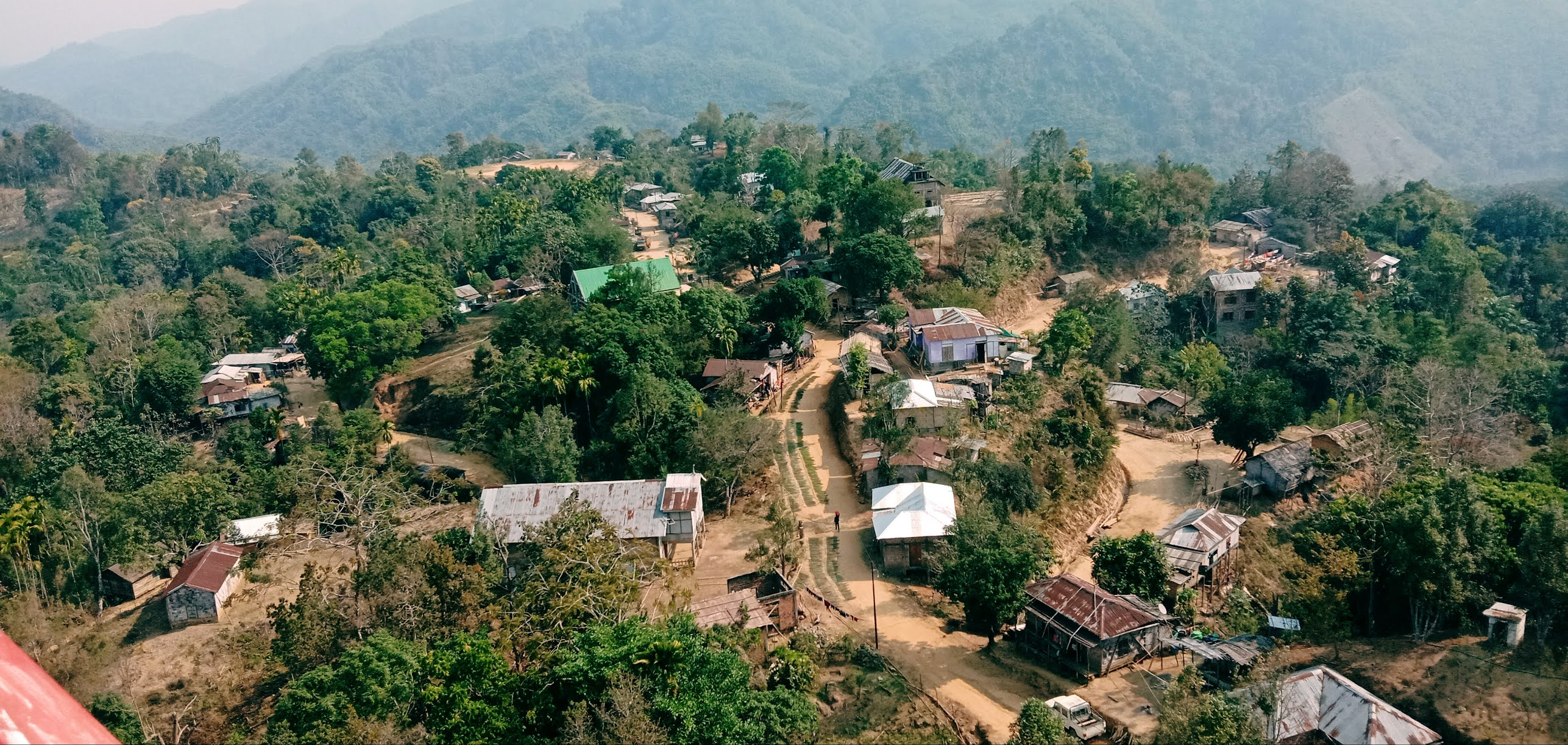

- Location within Manipur Location within India Location within Mizoram
- Coordinates: 24.2142689°N 93.0363800°E
- Country: India
- State: Manipur
- District: Pherzawl
- Sub-Division: Tipaimukh Sub-Division
- Established: 1977
- Founder: Lûnsawi

Government
  - Body: Village Authority

Population (2011)
  - Total: 771

Languages
  - Official: Hmar
- Time zone: UTC+5:30 (IST)
- PIN: 795121
- Vehicle registration: MN

Sipuikawn is a Hmar village in Pherzawl District, in the Indian state of Manipur. Sipuikawn is also known by its alternate name "Hmarkhawpui".

== Geography ==
It is located in south-western hilly region bordering Mizoram. It is close to Tipaimukh, the southern tip of the Vangaitlang range, where the Tuivai River joins the Barak River. National Highway 2 (formerly National Highway 150) passes through the village connecting the region to Mizoram and central Manipur.

== History ==
The history of Sipuikawn is believed to be much older than 1977. Sipuikawn villagers moved down from their earlier habitation in Hmawngzungkai.
