= Ikuto =

Ikuto may refer to:

== People ==
- Ikuto Hidaka (日高 郁人; born 1972), Japanese professional wrestler
- Ikuto Yamashita (山下 いくと; born 1965), Japanese manga artist and designer
- G. Ikuto Zhimomi, (born 1979) Indian politician

== Characters ==
- Ikuto Amamiya, a fictional character from the anime series Star Twinkle PreCure
- Ikuto Hagiwara, a fictional character from the manga series Kagurabachi
- Ikuto Noguchi, a fictional character from the anime series Digimon Data Squad
- Ikuto Tsukiyomi, a fictional character from the manga series Shugo Chara!
- Ikuto Tōhōin, a fictional character from the manga series Nagasarete Airantō
- Ikuto Tsumura, a fictional character from the manga series Smile Down the Runway
- Ikuto Kimata, a fictional character from the anime series Meganebu!
- Ikuto Kimijima, a fictional character from the manga and anime series The Prince of Tennis
- Ikuto Sarashina, a fictional character from the manga and anime series Maid Sama!
- Ikuto Yufu, a fictional character from the anime series Number24
