= Neiliezhü Üsou Memorial Award for Music =

Indian music award

Rev. Dr. Neiliezhü Üsou Memorial Award for Music
- Awarded for: Awarded to HSLC subject topper in Music under NBSE.
- Sponsored by: Rev. Dr. Neiliezhü Üsou Memorial Society
- Reward: ₹25,000 (Twenty Five thousand INR)
- Status: discontinued
- First award: 2009
- Final award: 2021

Highlights
- Total awarded: 19
- First winner: Sesino Savino
- Last winner(s): Yimlimongla Pongen

Rev. Dr. Neiliezhü Üsou Memorial Award for Music was a music award given annually by the Rev. Dr. Neiliezhü Üsou Memorial Society and approved by the Nagaland Board of School Education (NBSE). The award was named after the late Rev. Dr. Neiliezhü Üsou for his contribution to the growth of music in Nagaland.

== History ==
The award was instituted in 2009 and was an annual recognition given to the HSLC subject topper in Music under NBSE. The award carried a citation and cash money of ₹15,000 (Fifteen thousand Indian Rupees). Cash money was revised to ₹25,000 (Twenty Five thousand Indian Rupees) in 2020. The last awardee was granted in 2021.

== Award recipients ==
Name	School	Percentage	Year
Sesino Savino	Northfield School, Kohima	92%	2009
Tingneineng Vaiphei	Pilgrim School, Dimapur	93%	2010
Zekope-ü Sekhamo	G. Rio School, Kohima	94%	2011
Angel Ngüllie	Pilgrim School, Dimapur	98%	2012
Bozio Nienü	Baptist High, Kohima	98%	2013
Kezekevinuo Lydia Üsou	Christian Higher Secondary School, Dimapur	100%	2014
Neizelhounuo Süokhrie	Northfield School, Kohima	97%	2015†
Petenei Tacü	The Vineyard School, Kohima	97%	2015†
Vivikali K. Yeptho	Immanuel Higher Secondary School, Zünheboto	97%	2015†
Atounuo Rütsa	Christian Higher Secondary School, Dimapur	97%	2015†
Pelelhounuo Kuotsü	Christian Higher Secondary School, Dimapur	97%	2015†
Emtili Aier	Northfield School, Kohima	99%	2016
Neingusalie Yano	Northfield School, Kohima	100%	2017
Mengubeinuo Solo	Northfield School, Kohima	95%	2018†
Lhuvi Khate	Holy Cross Hr. Sec. School, Dimapur	95%	2018†
Thuisemla Shanglai	Patkai Hr. Sec. School, Chümoukedima	95%	2018†
Zhapusenuo Zuyie	Baptist High, Kohima	98%	2019
Ketuseno Meyase	Northfield School, Kohima	99%	2020
Yimlimongla Pongen	The Vineyard School, Kohima	99%	2021

† Multiple subject toppers in that year.
