= National Highway 702D (India) =

National highway in India

National Highway 702D
- Map of the National Highway in red

Route information
- Length: 85 km (53 mi)

Major junctions
- From: Mokokchung
- To: Jorhat

Location
- Country: India
- States: Nagaland, Assam

Highway system
- Roads in India; Expressways; National; State; Asian
← NH 2	→ NH 215

National Highway 702D, commonly called NH 702D is a national highway in the states of Nagaland and Assam in India. It is an offshoot of primary National Highway 2. This new highway has been accorded national status to upgrade it to two lanes and provide better movement for defense personnel and goods movement.

== Route ==
NH2 near Mokokchung, Mariani, NH715 near Jorhat

== Junctions ==
Terminal with NH 2 near Mokokchung.

Terminal with NH 215 near Jorhat.

== See also ==
- List of national highways in India
