= National Highway 702C (India) =

National highway in Assam, India

National Highway 702C
- Map of the National Highway in red

Route information
- Length: 48 km (30 mi)

Major junctions
- West end: Sibsagar
- East end: Sonari

Location
- Country: India
- States: Assam

Highway system
- Roads in India; Expressways; National; State; Asian
← NH 2	→ NH 702

National Highway 702C, commonly referred to as NH 702C is a national highway in India. It is a spur road of National Highway 2. NH-702C traverses the state of Assam in India.

== Route ==
Sibsagar, Simaluguri, Sonari.

== Junctions ==
NH 2 Terminal near Sibsagar.
NH 702 near Sonari.

== See also ==
- List of national highways in India
- List of national highways in India by state
