= G. Ikuto Zhimomi =

Indian politician (born 1979)

G. Ikuto Zhimomi (born 1979) is an Indian politician from Nagaland. He is an MLA from the Aghunato Assembly constituency, which is reserved for Scheduled Tribe community, in Zunheboto district. He won the 2023 Nagaland Legislative Assembly election, representing the Nationalist Democratic Progressive Party. He is the chief minister's advisor on land resources.

== Early life and education ==
Zhimomi is from Aghunato, Zunheboto District, Nagaland. He is the son of the late Ghonivi Zhimomi. He completed his B.Sc. in agriculture in 1983 at the College of Agriculture, Medziphema, Nagaland, which is affiliated with North Eastern Hill University, Shillong.

== Career ==
Zhimomi was elected in the 2023 Nagaland Legislative Assembly election from the Aghunato Assembly constituency, representing the Nationalist Democratic Progressive Party. He polled 7,133 votes and defeated his nearest rival, Hukiye N. Tissica of the Lok Janshakti Party (Ram Vilas), by 592 votes.
