= Zhaimai =

Zhaimai is one of the biggest villages in Senapati district in Manipur state, India. The biggest river of manipur, the Barak River, starts from the village. The number of households is about 1492.
