= National Highway 702 (India) =

National highway in India

National Highway 702
- Map of the National Highway in red

Route information
- Length: 177 km (110 mi)

Major junctions
- From: Chantongia
- To: Sapekhati, Assam

Location
- Country: India
- States: Nagaland, Assam

Highway system
- Roads in India; Expressways; National; State; Asian
← NH 502A	→ NH 702A

National Highway 702, commonly called NH 702 is a national highway in states of Nagaland and Assam in India. It is an offshoot of primary National Highway 2.

== Route ==
Chantongia, Longleng, Lonhching, Mon, Lapa, Tizit, Sonari, Sapekhati.

== Junctions ==
NH 2 Terminal near Chantongia.
NH 702B at Longleng.
NH 215 near Sapekhati.

== See also ==
- List of national highways in India
- List of national highways in India by state
