= Langkaih River =

River in India

The Langkaih is a river of western Mizoram, northeastern India. The river flows in a northerly direction, joining the Barak River in the Cachar plain of Assam.
