= Ankhasuo =

Village in Manipur, India

Ankhasuo Sibapurikhal
- Village
- Interactive map of Ankhasuo
- Location in Manipur, India Ankhasuo (India)
- Coordinates: 24.5691°N 93.0820°E
- Country: India
- State: Manipur
- District: Pherzawl

Population (2011)
  - Total: 1,841

Language(s)
  - Official: Meitei
- Time zone: UTC+5:30 (IST)
- Vehicle registration: MN
- Website: manipur.gov.in

Ankhasuo, also called Sibapurikhal, (Note: Alternative spellings: "Shibapurikhal".) is a census village in the Vangai Range subdivision, Pherzawl district, Manipur, India. The village is on the bank of the Barak River, close to the border between Pherzawl and Jiribam districts. Savomphai, the next village to the north is the last village in Pherzawl district. Other villages in the vicinity are Kasurbali (Note: Alternative spellings: "Kosurbali".) and Khangbor, the latter of which is enumerated within Ankhasuo for the census.

The Barak River flows north in this region, up to Jirimukh, where it turns northwest. The Barak River also forms the border with the Assam state of India.

== Geography and History ==
The entire Vangaitang range was part of the Cachar kingdom at the beginning of the 19th century. After annexing the kingdom in 1832, the British transferred the Vangaitang range to Manipur, setting the border along the western stretch of Barak River (Note: The Barak River flows south till Tipaimukh and then makes an almost 180°-bend to flow north till Jirimukh.) and the Jiri River.

In 1907, the Manipur government opened the "Jiribam valley" between the rivers and the Vangaitang range for agricultural settlement, which attracted settlers from Cachar, including Bengalis as well as Meiteis. The Vangaitang range is the traditional abode of the Hmar tribes.

=== Independent India ===
After the independence of India, a Jiribam subdivision was defined in Manipur to encompass the Vangaitang range from the east–west stretch of the Jiri River in the north to Tipaimukh in the south. The 1956 listing of villages in the subdivision includes Kosurbali and Shibapurikhal. In 1958, Sibapurikhal was listed one of the 16 village authorities in the Jiribam subdivision.

In due course, the southern and eastern hill regions were transferred to the Churachandpur district (now Pherzawl district), leaving only the valley and some of the foothills regions in the Jiribam subdivision. The border between the Jiribam and Pherzawl districts runs between Choudhurikhal and Savomphai.

The Jiribam–Tipaimukh Road ("JT Road"), which is the only state-level highway in the Jiribam district, runs through the region. Near the Khangbor village, it begins its climb the Vangaitang range, and runs on the ridge top on its way south.

In 2012, the fifth round of "environmental hearings" for the proposed oil and gas exploration by Jubilant Energy in Pherzawl and neighbouring districts were held at Ankhasuo. The civil society organisations of the region expressed their opposition to the exploration, citing the absence of flow of information and consensus seeking behind the efforts. The convener of the Committee on Protection of Natural Resources in Manipur said that, since all five public hearings raised objections from people, Jubilant should "pack up and leave".

== Demographics ==
The Ankhasuo (Sibapurikhal) census village has a population of 1841 people living in 355 households. 92 percent of the population is made of Scheduled Tribes. The census village likely includes the Khangbor village.

The neighbouring Kasurbali village has a population of 118 people, with only 4% belonging to Scheduled Tribes. Savomphai has a population of 442 people with 99% belonging to Scheduled Tribes.
