= National Highway 702B (India) =

National highway in India

National Highway 702B
- Map of National Highway 702B in red

Major junctions
- From: Longleng
- To: Tuensang

Location
- Country: India
- States: Nagaland

Highway system
- Roads in India; Expressways; National; State; Asian
← NH 702	→ NH 202

National Highway 702B, commonly called NH 702B is a national highway of India. It is entirely located in the state of Nagaland in India. NH-702B is a branch of National Highway 702.

== Route ==
From Longleng to Tuensang.

== Junctions ==
Junction with National Highway 702 near Longleng.

Junction with National Highway 202 near Tuensang.

== See also ==
- List of national highways in India
