= Jorabat =

- Suburb and Town
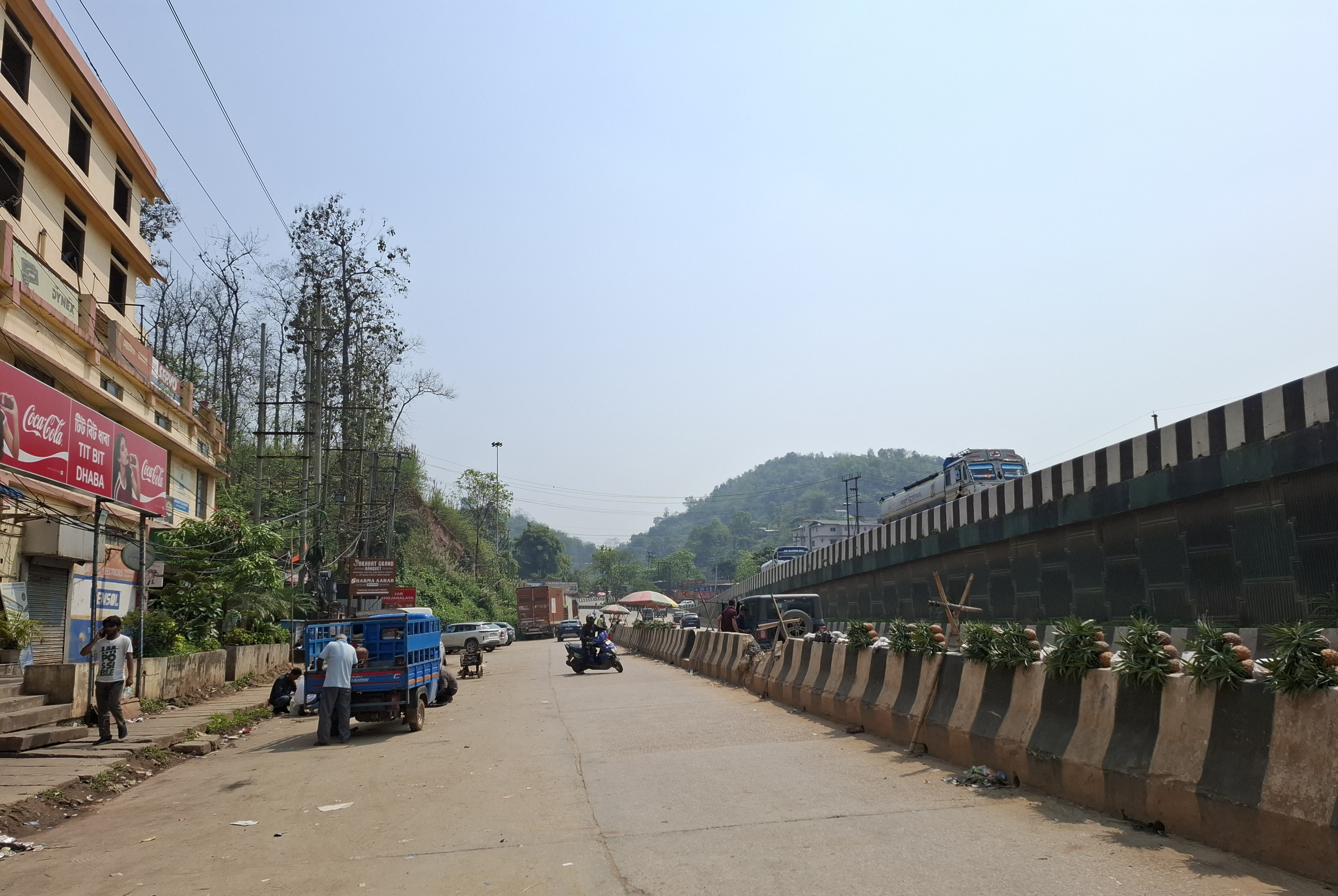
- Jorabat bus stand

- Location in Assam and Meghalaya, India Jorabat (India)
- Coordinates: 26.110321°0′0″N 91.867633°0′0″E
- Country: India
- State: Assam
- District: Kamrup Metropolitan
- State: Meghalaya
- District: Ri-Bhoi

Languages
  - Official: Assamese, English
- Time zone: UTC+5:30 (IST)
- PIN: 793101 or 781023
- Vehicle registration: ML- 10 or AS- 01
- Coastline: 0 kilometres (0 mi)

Jorabat is a village, suburban fringe and a junction which covers area under both Ri-Bhoi district, Meghalaya, India and Kamrup Metropolitan district, Assam, India, with greater parts in Kamrup Metropolitan district of Assam and lesser southern parts in Ri-Bhoi district of Meghalaya.

== Geography ==
The area is sandwiched between southern Brahmaputra Valley and northern parts of East Khasi Hills.

== Transport ==
National Highway 6 links Jorabat to Jowai via Shillong and a part of National Highway 27 part of Asian Highway 1 passes through Jorabat and connects parts of East Assam with Guwahati.
