= Aghunato =

- Town
- Location of Aghunato in Nagaland, India
- Coordinates: 26.0092911°N 94.5237627°E
- Country: India
- State: Nagaland
- District: Zünheboto District

Area
  - Total: 13 km^{2} (5.0 sq mi)
  - Rank: 2nd in Zünheboto
- Elevation: 1,555.77 m (5,104.2 ft)

Population (2011)
  - Total: 15,670
  - Rank: 2nd in Zünheboto & 23 in Nagaland
  - Density: 1,200/km^{2} (3,100/sq mi)

Languages
  - Official: English and Sümi
- Time zone: UTC+5:30 (IST)
- Vehicle registration: NL
- Website: nagaland.gov.in

Aghunato is a subdivision of the Zünheboto District of Nagaland, India. It has its own constituency in the state assembly and had 15,659 registered voters in the 2013 elections. Aghunato is represented in the state Legislative Assembly by Pukhayi. Its terrain is mountainous and dominated by evergreen forests. Geographic coordinates: 92 longitude - latitude 28-24

== See also ==
=== District Hq. ===
- Zunheboto

=== Sub Division ===
- Akuluto
- Satakha

=== District ===
- Zunheboto District
