= National Waterway 6 =

Waterways of India

Details
- Location: India
- Length: 121 km (75 mi)
- Owner: inland athourity of india
- Operator: Central Inland Water Transport Corporation (CIWTC)

National Waterways 6 is a waterway between Lakhipur and Bhanga of the Barak River.
