= Sümi Baptist Church, Zünheboto =

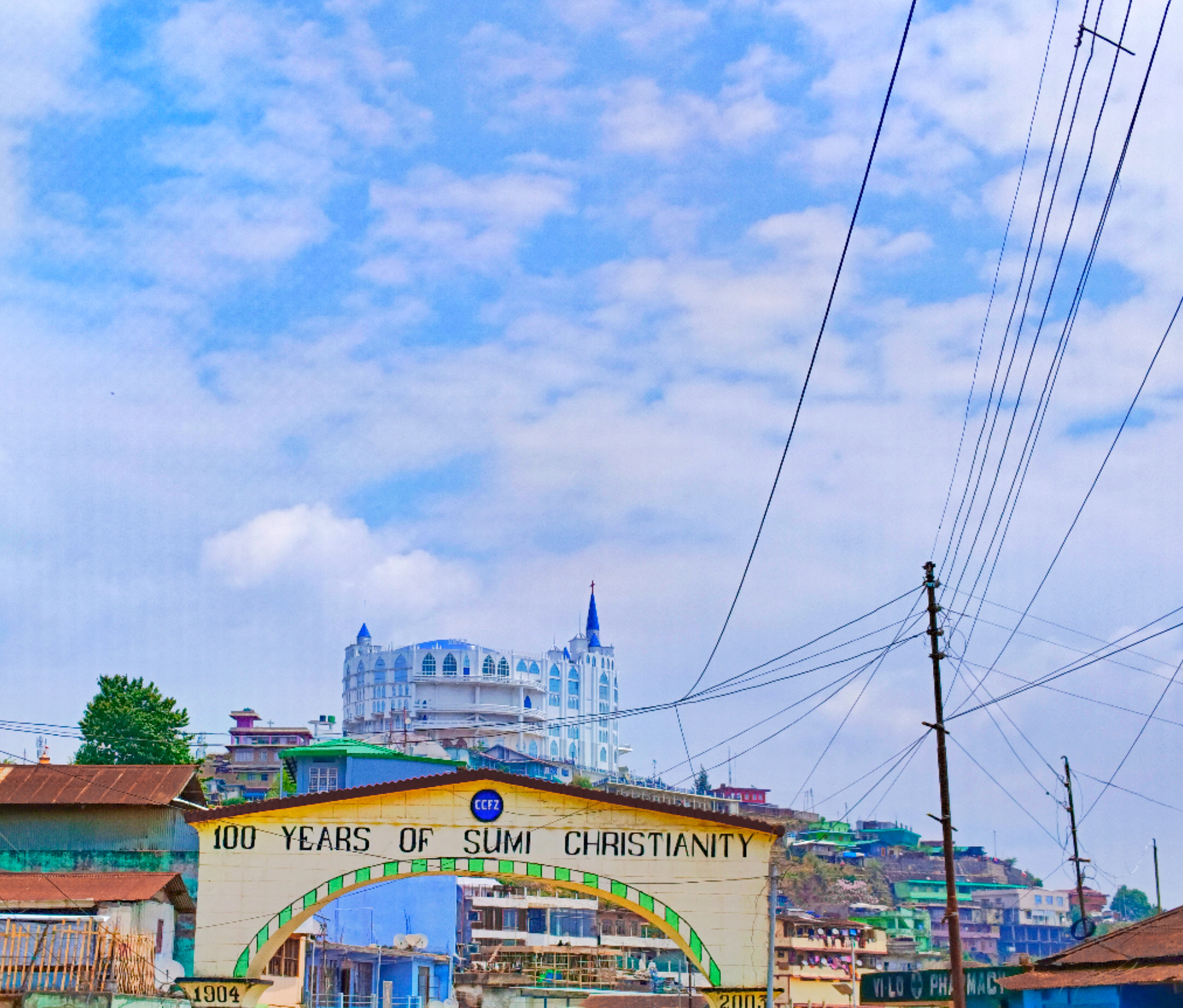
- Sümi Baptist Church, Zünheboto
- Sümi Baptist Church, Zünheboto
- 26°01′04.4″N 94°31′45.2″E
- Location: Zünheboto
- Country: India
- Denomination: Baptist
- Website: www.sbcz.org

History
- Founded: 1942; 84 years ago

Specifications
- Capacity: 8,500

Administration
- District: Zünheboto District

Sümi Baptist Church, Zünheboto is a Baptist church located in Zünheboto, Nagaland, India. It is affiliated with the Nagaland Baptist Church Council. The church is considered to be one of the largest church buildings in Asia. The church can accommodate over 8,500 people.

== History ==
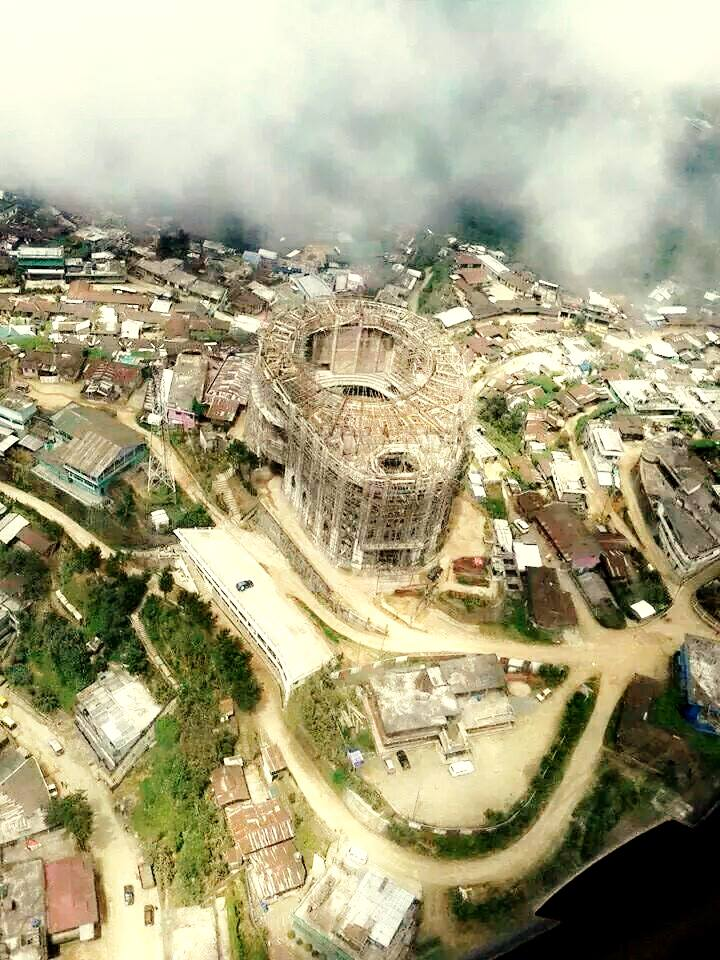
Aerial view of the church during construction

The church was founded in 1942.

The new church building construction began on 5 May 2007 and more than 2000 workers were issued inner line permits for the work. It took 10 years to build at a reported cost of ₹36 crores (about $3,750,000 in todays exchange rate). The church was dedicated by Rev. Dr. Solomon Rongpi, General Secretary of the Council of Baptist Churches in Northeast India on 22 April 2017. In 2017 the church had an attendance of 10,000 people.

== Dimensions ==
The church measures 23,73,476 Sq.ft in plinth area and has a blue dome and white turrets. The church is 203 feet in length, 153 feet in breadth and 166 feet in height. The church can seat 8500 people and also has 27 rooms for different purposes. The bell of the church was imported from Poland and costs Rupees 15 lakh (about $15,794 in todays exchange rate). The 500kg bell is made of 93% brass and 7% tin and has a 1.5km radial sound outreach.

== See also ==
- List of the largest evangelical churches
- List of the largest evangelical church auditoriums
