= National Highway 702A (India) =

National Highway in India

National Highway 702A
- Map of National Highway 702A in red

Route information
- Length: 212 km (132 mi)

Major junctions
- From: Mokokchung
- Runguzu
- To: Jessam

Location
- Country: India
- States: Nagaland, Manipur

Highway system
- Roads in India; Expressways; National; State; Asian
← NH 2	→ NH 29

National Highway 702A, commonly called NH 702A is a national highway in states of Nagaland and Manipur in India. It is a branch of primary National Highway 2.

== Route ==
NH2 near Mokokchung, Zunheboto, Satakha, Runguzu, Phek, NH29 near Jessami

== Junctions ==
Terminal with NH 2 near Mokokchung.

Junction at Runguzu Nasa

Terminal with NH 29 near Jessam.

== See also ==
- List of national highways in India
