= Thanlon =

Coordinates: 24°17′N 93°17′E

Thanlon is a village and headquarter of the Thanlon Sub-division in Churachandpur district in the Indian state of Manipur. It is also the headquarters of an eponymous subdivision. It is about 150 km west of the Churachandpur Town on National Highway 2. It is situated 3819 feet above sea level. It is also known as Tualbual.

== History ==
Thanlon was founded by Ngaihte chief by name Lumthang belonging to the Simte tribe. Major J Shakespear, SMS, gave him a boundary paper dated 11 February 1906 written in Lushai language:

Lumthanga, Ramri Pathawna'n lengphun kawna, Vanggui lui, Cherchi lui, Derkai kawn, Derkai lui, Tuivai Pamjal lui, Kaihlam tlangdung, Ramvawm lui, Tuipui Thlanlawn lui, Kotukawn Tualbual lui Tuijang Pathawng lungphun.

== See also ==
- List of populated places in Pherzawl district
