= Tipaimukh subdivision =

Tipaimukh Sub-Division Ruonglevaisuo
- Sub-Division
- Location in Manipur, India
- Country: India
- State: Manipur
- District: Pherzawl

Government
  - Body: Village Authority

Area
  - Total: 789.48 km^{2} (304.82 sq mi)

Languages
  - Official: Hmar
- Time zone: UTC+5:30 (IST)
- PIN: 795143
- Telephone code: 03874
- Vehicle registration: MN
- Sex ratio: 12,220 / 11,878 ♂/♀
- Website: manipur.gov.in

Tipaimukh Sub-Division is located in south-western hilly region of Manipur bordering the Indian state of Mizoram. It is one of the six tribal development blocks of Churachandpur district in Manipur state. Parbung is the sub-divisional block headquarters. The total geographic area of the sub-division block is 789.48 km², having 55 villages with the total population of 23,995 approx. The total number of voters is 18,848. The total distance from the Parbung to the district headquarters town of Churachandpur is 247 km through the Tipaimukh Road, also known as NH 150.

== Meaning of name ==
The indigenous name of Tipaimukh is Ruonglevaisuo. "Tipaimukh" is a combination of "Tipai", a corrupted version of the name of the Tuivai River, and mukh, which means "mouth" in Bengali. "Ruonglevaisuo" (ruong-le-vai-suo) is a combination of "Ruong" (from "Ruongnau", le, meaning "and"; Vai, taken from the name of the Tuivai River; and suo, meaning "mouth". Hence, both "Tipaimukh" and "Ruonglevaisuo" refer to the Mouth of the Tuivai and Ruongnau rivers at this location.

== People ==
The majority of the people inhabiting Tipaimukh are the indigenous Hmar people who are spread in large numbers in neighbouring Indian states of Mizoram, Assam, Tripura and Meghalaya. The Hmars are one of the recognised Scheduled Tribes of India since the 1950s. The Hmars were the first to settle in this region since the 18th century. Other tribals inhabiting this region, but who are found in small numbers, are the kindred tribes viz., Zou, Gangte, Paite, Vaiphei, etc.

== Situation ==
Tipaimukh was one of the most neglected regions in the state of Manipur due to its remote location. A few years back due to insurgency problems there was near complete absence of state government establishment, no proper educational facilities, no hospitals, doctors or public health centres (PHC), no proper Public Distribution System (PDS), no electrification and no proper communication system such as roadways, mobile or telephone connectivity. The people's only reliable means of communication with those outside their region was through radio. The region had been deprived of any development works for more than a decade or so. However, with the improvement in the law and order situation, a gradual increase in development has been initiated by the state government such as employment generation via MGNREGs, and infrastructural development through various other schemes such as MsDP, BRGF, IAY, IWMP etc., implemented and monitored by the Sub-Divisional Officer and Block Development Officer but these is less effective mainly due to the ever skyrocking corruption. The Sub-Division, has a motorable road connectivity on par with most roads within the district however the fare or charge for passenger is one of the highest in the world. Nevertheless, there are still much to be done, especially in the energy sector viz. Electricity which has yet to reach 90% of the population.

== Politics ==
Tipaimukh A/C is part of Outer Manipur (Lok Sabha constituency).
