= Atoizu =

Village in Nagaland, India

- Village
- Country: India
- State: Nagaland
- District: Zünheboto district
- Time zone: UTC+5:30 (IST)
- PIN: 798620

Atoziu or Atoizü is a small hill town in the Zünheboto district, Nagaland.

== History ==
Atoziu has experienced the Naga Conflict for many years, which has impacted the education of the town.

On 9 September 2022, the Atoizu Police Outpost first established in 1974, was upgraded to the Atoizu Police Station.
