= National Highway 502A (India) =

National highway in India

National Highway 502A
- Map of National Highway 502A in red

Route information
- Length: 100 km (62 mi)

Major junctions
- North end: Lawngtlai
- South end: India/Myanmar Border

Location
- Country: India
- States: Mizoram

Highway system
- Roads in India; Expressways; National; State; Asian
← NH 2	→ NH 702

National Highway 502A, commonly referred to as NH 502A is a national highway in India. It is a spur road of National Highway 2. NH-502A traverses the state of Mizoram and in India.

== Route ==
Lawngtlai on NH-2 and terminating at Myanmar Border (Kaladan Road).

== Junctions ==
NH 2 Terminal near Lawngtlai.

== See also ==
- List of national highways in India
- List of national highways in India by state
