= National Highway 302 (India) =

National highway in India

National Highway 302
- Map of National Highway 302 in red

Route information
- Length: 10 km (6.2 mi)

Major junctions
- From: Lunglei
- To: Theriat

Location
- Country: India
- States: Mizoram

Highway system
- Roads in India; Expressways; National; State; Asian
← NH 202	→ NH 502

National Highway 302 (NH 302) starts from Lunglei and ends at Theriat, both places in the state of Mizoram. The highway is 10 km (6.2 mi) long and runs only in the state of Mizoram.

== See also ==
- List of national highways in India
- National Highways Development Project
