= Tuipang =

Tipa Tipa V
- town
- Location within Mizoram Location within India
- Coordinates: 22°19′0″N 93°2′0″E
- Country: India
- State: Mizoram
- District: Siaha
- Elevation: 1,079 m (3,540 ft)

Languages
  - Official: Mara
- Time zone: UTC+5:30 (IST)
- PIN: 796911
- Vehicle registration: MZ03
- Coastline: 0 kilometres (0 mi)
- Nearest city: Siaha
- Website: saiha.nic.in

Tipa is a town in Siaha district, Mizoram, India.

== Geography ==
It is located at 22°19′0″N 93°2′0″E at an elevation of 1079 m above MSL.
