= Taithu =

Village in Pherzawl District, Northeast India

- Village
- Location in Manipur, India Taithu (India)
- Coordinates: 24.30644°N 93.12485°E
- Country: India
- State: Manipur
- District: Pherzawl District..
- Established: 1920

Population (2011)
  - Total: 1,173

Languages
  - Official: Hmar
- Time zone: UTC+5:30 (IST)
- PIN: 795143
- Vehicle registration: MN

Taithu, (Hmar: Tai-thu) is a Hmar village in Pherzawl district, Northeast India. The National Highway 2 runs through this village connecting Manipur and Mizoram. According to the 2016 House Counting Data from the Government of Manipur, Taithu has 211 households where its population is recorded as 1198, with 601 males and 597 females.

== History ==
Taithu was founded in 1920 by six men, namely Chawngthakung Zote, Sieka Changsan, Selthang Zote Saihmang, Thangsawnhlei Huolngo, Bonga Huolngo and Daisat Pakhuong.

=== Etymology ===
Taithu was first called "Rengpui Bung." A narrative is passed on that "a certain type of traditional alcoholic drink or, perhaps a by-product called 'Zutaife' once 'sweetly' stenched the streets of the village" and hence adopted its new name, "Taithu," from there. "Tai" comes from 'Zutaife' and "thu" literally in Hmar means "a foul smell; stench".

Upa C. Zathang in a chapter titled "Taithu Khuo Tobul le Hmatieng" of the village's centenary souvenir wrote:

A sakhming lamrika um Taithu hi a tirtak chun, "Rengpui Bung" ti in an ko lai hun khawm a um nia hriet ani a, sienkhawm a khuo a cheng hai hi, thawna tieng tieng a mi taima an lo ni leiin, khuonu malsawmna Bu le Bal hnienghnar em em a, khuo mipui hai hin an lo dawng hlak ani leiin, chuong hun laia ngai pawimaw lo ni hlak 'Zu' 'zutaife' lampui sira rim thu vengvung a um chu hminga put hielin 'RENGPUI BUNG' tia ko chu sakhming thar 'TAITHU' tia ko alo hlaw lem tah pei nia hriet anih (23-24).

Taithu Panoramic Shot

=== Taithu Village Authority ===
First Taithu Village Authority (1960-1968)
Designation	Name
Chairman	Darro*
Secretary	Thangthuom
Treasurer	Lalsuochung
Members	K.Khuma, Ngila, Tuovung, Thangpieng
Tlangsam	Tawna, Khuongzalien
Thangpuitu	Thangkhawlam

*Darro was put in lieu of the village Chief Lienkhawthang.

== Notable people ==
According to a 100-year anniversary souvenir of Taithu, the village has produced some 360 people working for the Government of India or a private company. Below are some personalities that the village's book considers noteworthy:

- Zothangsei, Indian Administrative Service
- Chawnglien, Indian Administrative Service
- Khamhminglien, Indian Revenue Service

== Schools ==
- Taithu PMS Jr. High School (estd. 1976)
- Taithu Primary School
- Taithu Government JB School (estd. 1963)
- Peter's School (estd. 1999; till 1996)
- WMCI School (est. 1999; till 2000)
- Taithu ICI ME School (estd. 1945; till 2004)
