= Bhanga Bazar =

Bhanga Bazar ভাঙ্গা বাজার
- Market
- Bhanga Bazar
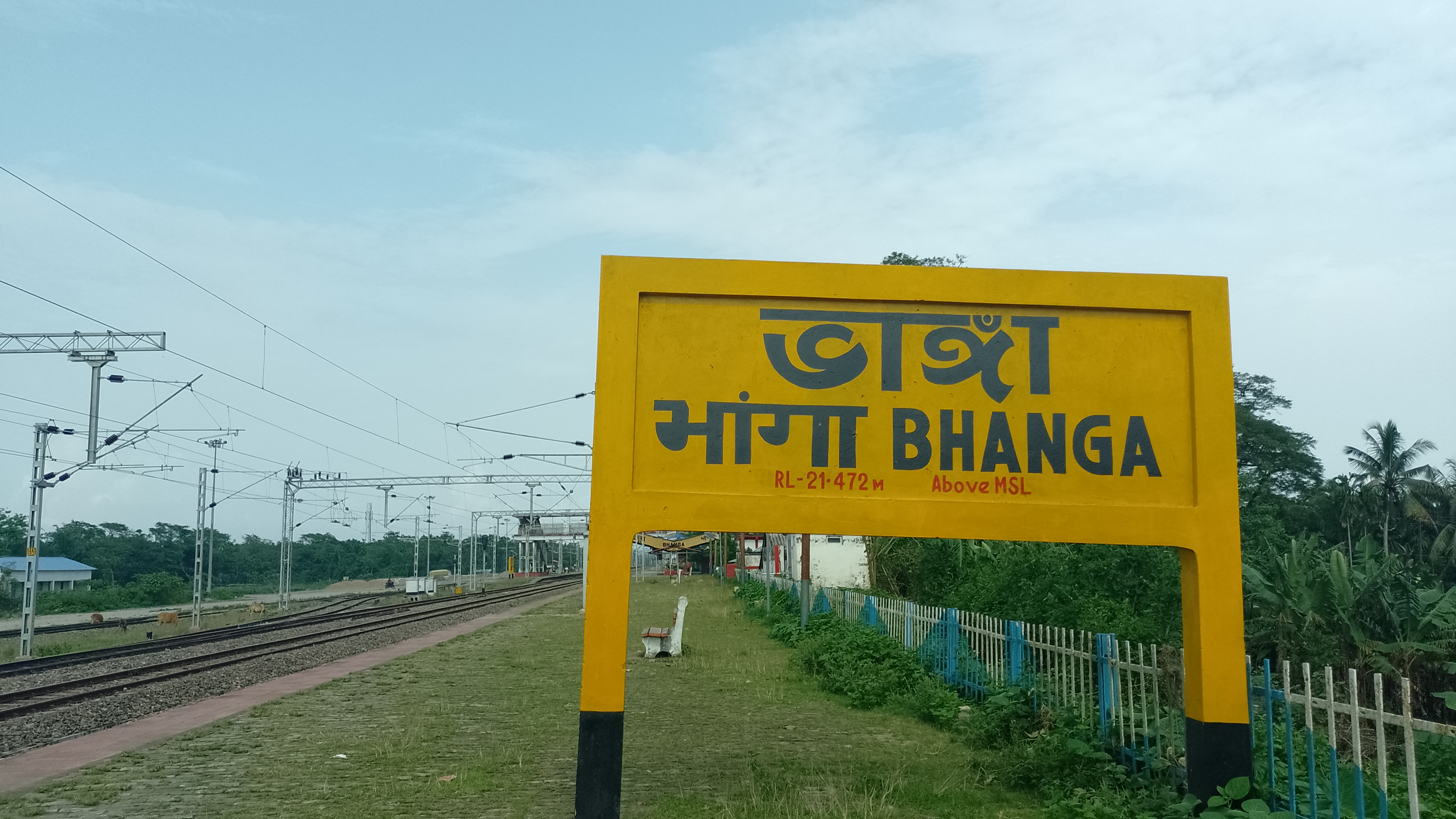
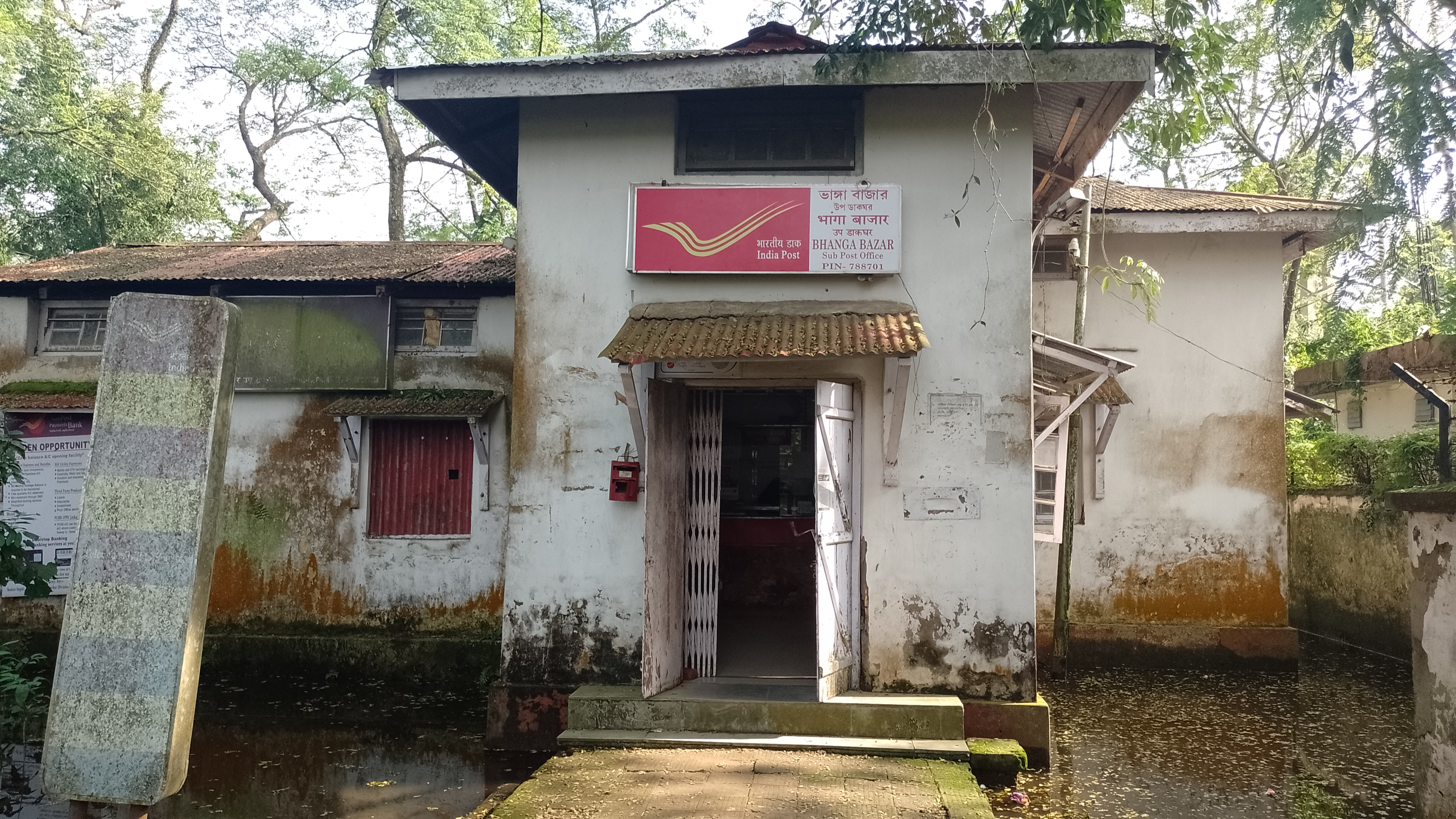
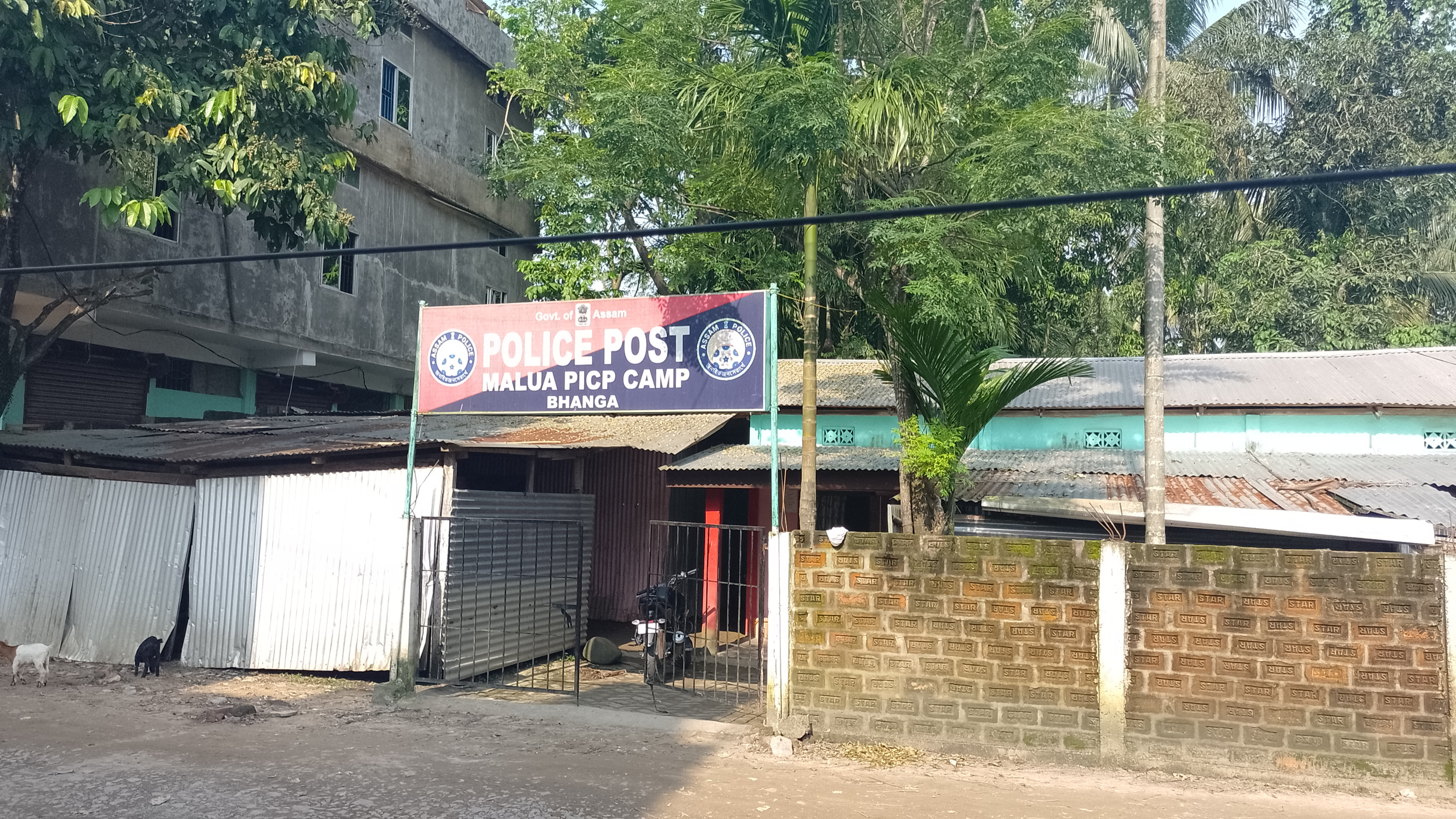
- From top left to right:Bhanga railway station, Bhanga post-office, Bhanga police out-post.
- Nickname: Bhanga
- Interactive map of Bhanga Bazar
- Coordinates: 24.8594935°N 92.4785431°E
- Country: India
- State: Assam
- District: Karimganj

Government
  - Type: Panchayati raj
  - Body: Masely Gram Panchayat
  - GP President: Debojyoti Dey ( Sani) (BJP)

Area
  - Total: 1 km^{2} (0.39 sq mi)
- Elevation: 15 m (49 ft)

Languages
  - Official: Bengali
- Time zone: UTC+5:30 (IST)
- Postal code: 788701
- Area code: 03843
- Vehicle registration: AS-10

'Bhanga Bazar': A Historic Trade and Transport Hub of Karimganj

Located in the Karimganj district of Assam (PIN 788701), Bhanga Bazar is one of the oldest and most historically significant marketplaces of the Barak Valley. Administratively, it falls under the Badarpur Police Station and was earlier part of the Masly (Mosli) Gaon Panchayat, which is now known as Kalachand Gaon Panchayat after delimitation. It is under Badarpur Development Block.

The local language is Sylheti, reflecting Bhanga Bazar’s deep cultural ties to the former Sylhet Division, of which it was once a part before India’s independence. This linguistic and historical connection still defines much of the area’s social and cultural identity today.

From Riverbank Roots to Modern Center

Bhanga Bazar was originally established on the southern bank of the Kushiyara River, near the present international border. Its strategic location made it a key hub for cattle and betel nut trade. Merchants and farmers from across the region gathered here, making it one of the busiest markets in Karimganj. Over time, due to riverbank erosion and border security restrictions, the old market slowly shifted inland to what is now known as Bhanga Bazar Point (চৌমাতা).

A Market with a Lasting Tradition

Bhanga Bazar is best known for its weekly market, held every Wednesday and Saturday. While shops now operate daily, these two days remain special — dedicated largely to the betel nut (supari) trade, which has been the economic lifeline of the area for generations. The market continues to draw large crowds from surrounding villages and towns, keeping its centuries-old rhythm alive.

The Railway Legacy

Bhanga is also home to one of the oldest railway stations in the region, established during the British era. The Bhanga railway station played a vital role in connecting the southern Barak Valley to larger trade routes.

Today, it houses a railway goods yard, where freight trains unload commodities that are then distributed by truck across the entire Barak Valley. This infrastructure has reinforced Bhanga’s importance as a transport and logistics hub for southern Assam.

A Rare Partition Story

Bhanga Bazar also holds a remarkable place in the subcontinent’s post-independence history.

After the partition of India in 1947, Bhanga Bazar — along with nearly three and a half police station areas — was initially placed under East Pakistan(now Bangladesh) for two days. Following a referendum (1947 Sylhet referendum) and administrative review, the residents chose to join India officially two days after independence. This brief episode is still remembered with pride as a testament to the people’s will and identity.

Present-Day Bhanga

Modern Bhanga Bazar is a well-developed rural town featuring a Sub-Registrar Office, Government Higher Secondary School, several private schools, banks, and a growing number of public services.

Though the cattle market has ceased due to border restrictions, trade in betel nut and essential goods continues to thrive, sustaining its position as the commercial heart of the area.

Bhanga Bazar today stands as a symbol of resilience and continuity — a place that has weathered the tides of geography, politics, and time, yet continues to flourish as a center of trade, transport, and community life in the Barak Valley.

== Geography ==
Bhangabazar is located at 24.89°N 92.55°E. It has an average elevation of 15 metres. It is situated on the south bank of Kushiyara River which separate the town from Bangladesh.

The distance of Bhangabazar town from the state capital of Assam, Dispur is 310.8 km via NH 44, 13.8 km from Badarpur, Assam, 14.8 km from Karimganj, Assam. Bhanga Bazar was the original part of Sylhet District wherein a large number of people have been gathered in two days for a week for their business purposes such as betel nut, domestic items and cattle markets etc. But at present there is no such market as in previous time due to international border areas.

== Schools and colleges ==
Affiliated to Secondary Board of Education, Assam (SEBA) & the colleges are affiliated to Assam Higher Secondary Education Council.Most eminent schools are Talent Academy run by MAMM Foundation an Aziz Ahmed Choudhury initiative). Model High School, Gurucharan High School, Bhanga Higher Secondary School & Bhanga Public High School. Notable alumni of Model High School Includes Fayez Ahmed. An alternative medical institute called Regional Paramedical Institute.
