= Zünheboto =

Town in Nagaland, India

- Town
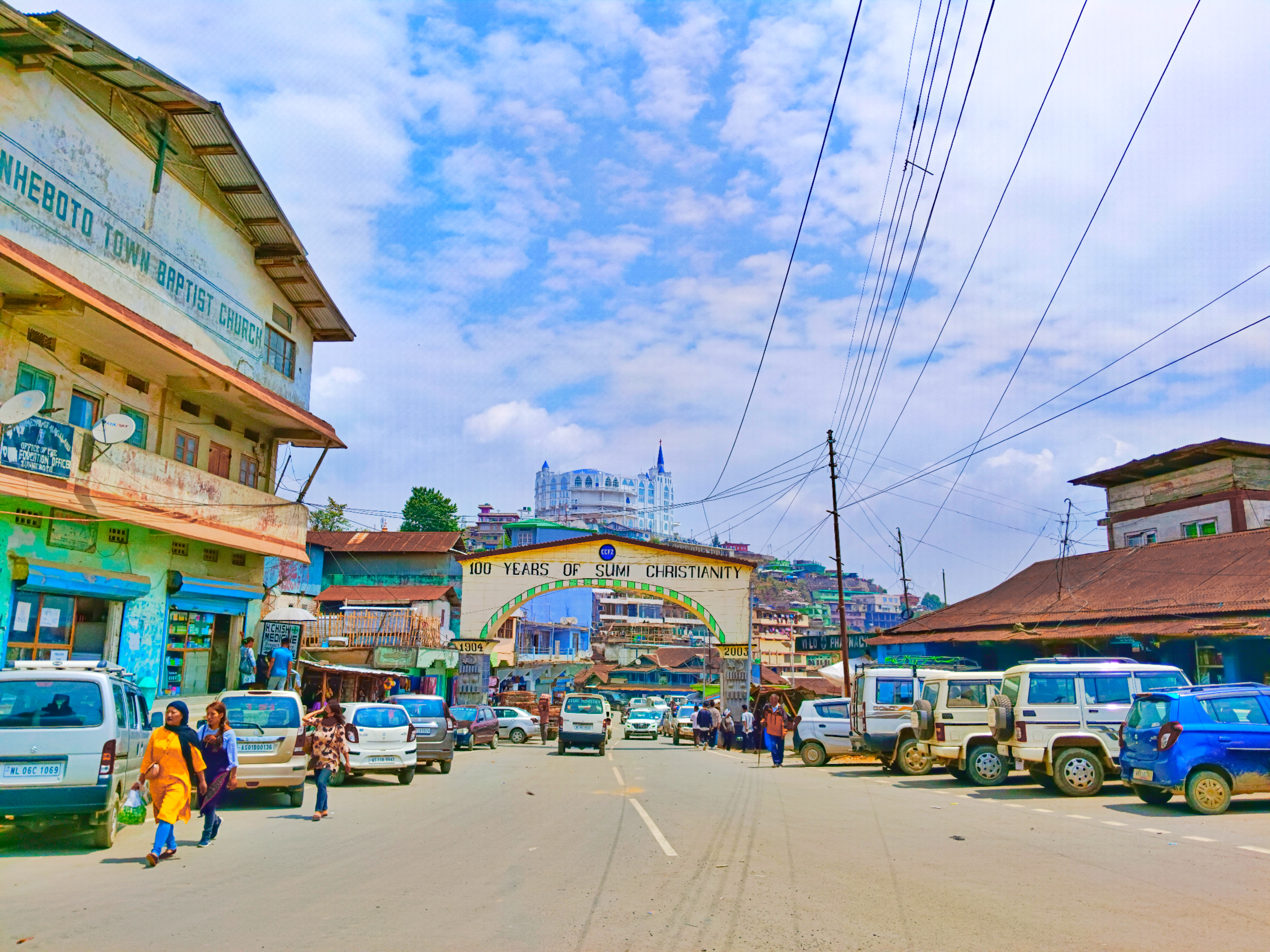
- View of Zünheboto Town
- Nickname: Land Of Warriors
- Location of Zünheboto in Nagaland
- Coordinates: 26.0146°N 94.5264°E
- Country: India
- State: Nagaland
- District: Zünheboto District
- Elevation: 1,852 m (6,076 ft)

Population (2011)
  - Total: 22,809
  - Density: 331/km^{2} (860/sq mi)

Languages
  - Official: English
  - Major language: Sümi
- Time zone: UTC+5:30 (IST)
- Postal code: 798620
- Vehicle registration: NL-06
- Website: https://zunheboto.nic.in

Zünheboto (/ˌzʌnˈhiːbəʊtəʊ/), also known as Zünhebo, is a town in Zünheboto district in the Indian state of Nagaland. Zünheboto is inhabited by the Sümi Nagas. It is the location of one of the largest Baptist church in Asia, the Sümi Baptist Church, Zünheboto.

== Etymology ==
The word Zünheboto is derived from the Sümi words zünhebo, the name of a flowering shrub Leucosceptrum, and to or ato, hill top. The zünhebo plant grows abundantly in this region and the town was built on the top of the rolling hills hence the name, Zünhebo-to or Zünheboto. Hence, Zünheboto means the hill top of Zünhebo flowers.

== Geography ==
Zünheboto lies north of the Satoi Range. Due to its elevation, Zünheboto features a more moderate version of a humid subtropical climate (Cwa. Zünheboto has cool winters and hot very rainy summers. The coldest months are from December to February, when frost occurs and in the higher altitudes snowfall occurs occasionally. During the height of summers, from June–August, temperature ranges an average of 80–90 °F (27–32 °C). Heavy rainfall occurs during summer.

Climate data for Zünheboto
Month	Jan	Feb	Mar	Apr	May	Jun	Jul	Aug	Sep	Oct	Nov	Dec	Year
Record high °C (°F)	23.5 (74.3)	25.0 (77.0)	29.1 (84.4)	32.2 (90.0)	33.9 (93.0)	30.5 (86.9)	33.1 (91.6)	31.1 (88.0)	31.0 (87.8)	31.5 (88.7)	29.5 (85.1)	26.0 (78.8)	33.9 (93.0)
Mean daily maximum °C (°F)	16.6 (61.9)	17.9 (64.2)	22.1 (71.8)	24.1 (75.4)	24.4 (75.9)	24.9 (76.8)	25.0 (77.0)	25.4 (77.7)	25.0 (77.0)	23.4 (74.1)	20.6 (69.1)	17.7 (63.9)	22.2 (72.0)
Mean daily minimum °C (°F)	8.1 (46.6)	9.3 (48.7)	12.7 (54.9)	15.6 (60.1)	16.9 (62.4)	18.1 (64.6)	18.8 (65.8)	18.9 (66.0)	18.1 (64.6)	16.6 (61.9)	13.1 (55.6)	9.4 (48.9)	14.6 (58.3)
Record low °C (°F)	1.0 (33.8)	2.3 (36.1)	4.0 (39.2)	5.0 (41.0)	10.0 (50.0)	9.4 (48.9)	7.8 (46.0)	8.3 (46.9)	8.9 (48.0)	5.0 (41.0)	3.1 (37.6)	2.8 (37.0)	1.0 (33.8)
Average rainfall mm (inches)	11.7 (0.46)	35.4 (1.39)	47.6 (1.87)	88.7 (3.49)	159.2 (6.27)	333.8 (13.14)	371.8 (14.64)	364.0 (14.33)	250.1 (9.85)	126.0 (4.96)	35.2 (1.39)	7.8 (0.31)	1,831.3 (72.10)
Average rainy days	2.0	3.9	5.8	12.2	16.9	23.1	24.6	22.9	19.1	10.7	3.6	1.4	146.2

== Demographics ==
As of 2011, Zünheboto had a population of 22,633. Males constitute 51.7% of the population and females 48.23%.

== Educational Institutions ==
=== Schools in Zünheboto ===
- Bloomfield Hill School
- Corner Stone Foundation School
- Eden Garden School
- Government Higher Secondary School
- Immanuel Higher Secondary School
- Kids World Montessori
- Little Spring School
- Love Dale Higher Secondary School
- Merry Hill School
- New Era School
- Olympic Higher Secondary School
- Sacred Heart School
- Seven Home School
- Shamrock School
- St. Anthony School
- Step By Step School
- Sunbeam School
- Woodland Higher Secondary School

=== Colleges ===
- Zünheboto Government College
- Nito Theological College
- Anderson Theological College

== See also ==
- Aghunato
- Satakha
- Akuluto
