= National Highway 202 (India) =

National highway in India

National Highway 202
- Map of National Highway 202 in red

Route information
- Length: 460 km (290 mi)

Major junctions
- From: Mokokchung, Nagaland
- National Highway 2 at Imphal and National Highway 2 in Mokokchung
- To: Imphal, Manipur

Location
- Country: India
- States: Nagaland, Manipur
- Primary destinations: Tuensang, Ukhrul

Highway system
- Roads in India; Expressways; National; State; Asian
← NH 2	→ NH 302

National Highway 202 (NH 202) is a National Highway in India that links Mokokchung to Imphal and runs for a distance of 460 km (290 mi). It partly uses the alignment of National Highway 150 of the old numbering scheme.

Name	Relation	Status	Length	route	Remarks
NH202	11664511		460km	(NH155)NH2 near Mokokchung, Tuensang, Sampurre, Meluri, (NH150)Jessami, Ukhrul, NH2 near Imphal	
