= Lungthulien =

Village in Manipur, India

- Village
- Location in Manipur, India Lungthulien (India)
- Coordinates: 24.21650°N 93.08598°E
- Country: India
- State: Manipur
- District: Pherzawl District

Population (2011)
  - Total: 1,714

Languages
  - Official: Hmar
- Time zone: UTC+5:30 (IST)
- Vehicle registration: MN

Lungthulien (anglicised: lung-thu-lin) is a Hmar village in Pherzawl district, Manipur, India. As of 2011, the village has 304 households. It was in the news in 2006 because the village's inhabitants had faced insurgency-related atrocities. Militants belonging to the United National Liberation Front (UNLF) and the Kangleipak Communist Party (KCP) attacked the villagers and extorted cash and goods from them.
