= Loibuol =

Village in Pherzawl District, Northeast India

Lawibual Lawibual
- Village
- Location in Manipur, India Lawibual (India)
- Coordinates: 24.29584°N 93.22475°E
- Country: India
- State: Manipur
- District: Pherzawl District.

Languages
- Time zone: UTC+5:30 (IST)
- Vehicle registration: MN

Lawibual is a Paite village in Pherzawl District, Manipur under Tipaimukh Sub-division.

== Institutions ==
- Eklavya Model Residential School (EMRS) - Tipaimukh
