= Kawlkulh =

- village
- Location in Mizoram, India Kawlkulh (India)
- Coordinates: 23.6152651°N 93.08392°E
- Country: India
- State: Mizoram
- District: Khawzawl
- Block: Khawzawl
- Elevation: 1,116 m (3,661 ft)

Population (2011)
  - Total: 3,094
- Time zone: UTC+5:30 (IST)
- 2011 census code: 271306

Kawlkulh is a village in the Khawzawl District of Mizoram, India. It is located in the Khawzawl R.D. Block.

== Demographics ==
According to the 2011 census of India, Kawlkulh has 700 households. The effective literacy rate (i.e. the literacy rate of population excluding children aged 6 and below) is 94.87%.

Demographics (2011 Census)
	Total	Male	Female
Population	3094	1531	1563
Children aged below 6 years	406	207	199
Scheduled caste	0	0	0
Scheduled tribe	2970	1461	1509
Literates	2550	1284	1266
Workers (all)	1491	865	626
Main workers (total)	1397	841	556
Main workers: Cultivators	900	516	384
Main workers: Agricultural labourers	118	53	65
Main workers: Household industry workers	18	15	3
Main workers: Other	361	257	104
Marginal workers (total)	94	24	70
Marginal workers: Cultivators	54	9	45
Marginal workers: Agricultural labourers	28	6	22
Marginal workers: Household industry workers	2	1	1
Marginal workers: Others	10	8	2
Non-workers	1603	666	937
