= Tipaimukh =

- Location within Manipur Location within Mizoram Location within India
- Interactive map of Tipaimukh
- Coordinates: 24°14′06″N 93°01′15″E
- Location: Mizoram–Manipur boundary, India
- Elevation: 50 m (160 ft)

Tipaimukh is the mouth of the Tuivai River (also called Tipai River) as its joins the Barak River. Its location is the southern tip of the Vangaitang range, around which the Barak River makes a U-turn.

Tipaimukh is a historic location. It lay on the "old ancient trade route" of Manipur towards the west, called the "Khongjai route". It led to Kachar and Bengal. In early 19th century, British geographers described Tipaimukh as the junction of the kingdoms Manipur, Tripura (now Mizoram) and Kachar (now Assam). The boundary of Manipur was moved down south to its present location in 1900. Tipaimukh however remains on the western boundary of Manipur.

The name of Tipaimukh has been used to name a subdivision of the Churachandpur district in 1972. It included the Vangaitang range as well as the hills to south and southeast of Tipaimukh. The Vangaitang range was subsequently separated as the Vangai Range Subdivision, and the remaining hill area continues as the Tipaimukh–Parbung Subdivision.

== Geography ==
The Barak River which flows due southwest in Manipur is blocked by the Vangaitang range, and forced to flow south at the foot of the range. After reaching Tipaimukh at the southern tip of the range, it turns north. The Tuivai River (also called "Chikoo nullah"), which follows along a tortuous route through the southern hills of Manipur, flows north in this area, and drains into the Barak River at Tipaimukh.

This section of the Tuivai River as well as a 25-km-stretch of the north-flowing Barak River form the boundary of Manipur against Mizoram. National Highway 2 in this area, which is traditionally called the "Tipaimukh Road", runs through the nearby Sipuikawn village, and crosses the Tuivai River on its way to Aizawl in Mizoram.

== Bibliography ==
- Churachandpur District Census Handbook (PDF), Directorate of Census Operations, Manipur, 2011
- Pau, Pum Khan (2023), "'Cartography of Self-Assertion': Superimposed Boundary and Local Response in the India–Myanmar Borderland", in Chhanda Chatterjee (ed.), The Partition of the Indian Subcontinent (1947) and Beyond: Uneasy Borders (eBook ed.), Taylor & Francis, pp. 47–64, ISBN 9781000849769
- Pemberton, Capt. R. Boileau (1835), Report on the Eastern Frontier of British India, Calcutta: Government of India, pp. 20–21 – via archive.org
