= Satakha =

Satakha Atukuzu
- Town
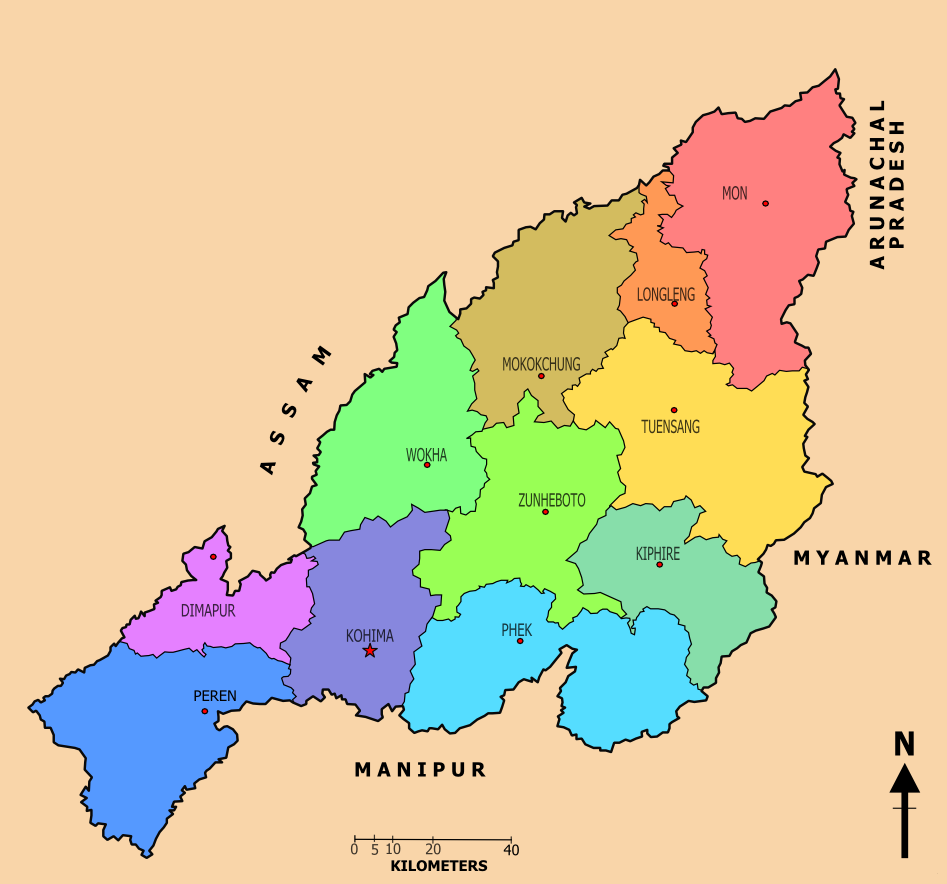
- Satakha is in Zunheboto District

- Location of Satakha in North-East India
- Coordinates: 25.9167°N 94.5167°E
- Country: India
- State: Nagaland
- District: Zunheboto
- Established: 1972

Government
  - Type: Town

Area
  - Total: 10 km^{2} (3.9 sq mi)
  - Rank: 45th in Nagaland
- Elevation: 1,113.73 m (3,654.0 ft)

Population (2011)
  - Total: 11,002
  - Rank: 63rd in Nagaland & 778th in India
  - Density: 57/km^{2} (150/sq mi)

Languages
  - Official: English
- Time zone: UTC+5:30 (IST)
- Postal Code: 798620
- Vehicle registration: NL-06
- Website: http://Zunheboto.nic.in

Satakha (Pron:/, Stækhæ/) is a town and a town area committee in Zunheboto district in the state of Nagaland, India. It is a sub division and administration is headed by the office of Additional Deputy Commissioner. It has five major colonies, each headed by a Gaon Bura (GB) 1. Administration by Vitoho Zhimo 2. School Colony by Vihozhe Zhimo 3. Center Colony by Hosheto Mürrü 4. B-Khel by Kajeto Zhimo 5. A-Khel by Ahovi Zhimo.

State Bank Of India is the only banking facility in the town. Satakha is also a headquarter of 111 Battalion Border Security Force.

== See also ==
- Aghunato
- Akuluto
