= Tuivai River =

Tuivai Tuyai, Tipai
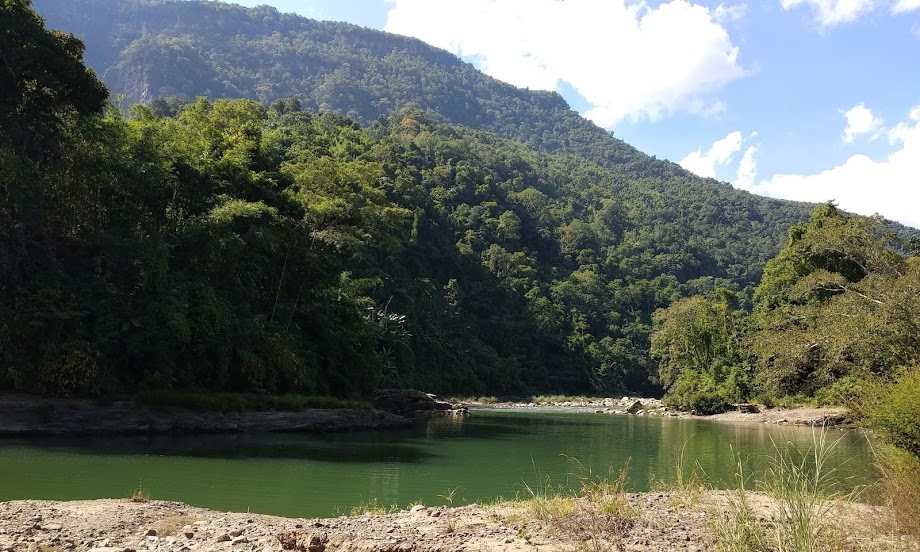
- Tuivai river in Champhai district, Mizoram

- Location within Manipur Location within Mizoram Location within India

Location
- Country: Myanmar, India
- State: Chin State, Manipur, Mizoram

Physical characteristics
- Source: Chin Hills
  - location: Chin State, Myanmar
  - coordinates: 23.719°N 93.531°E
  - elevation: 1,594 metres (5,230 ft)
- 2nd source: Thangjing Hills
  - location: Manipur, India
  - coordinates: 24.422°N 93.647°E
  - elevation: 1,594 metres (5,230 ft)
- Mouth: Barak River
  - location: Sipuikawn/Tipaimukh
  - coordinates: 24°14′07″N 93°01′23″E
  - elevation: 60 metres (200 ft)

Basin features
- Progression: Barak River
- River system: Brahmaputra
- Tributaries
  - left: Tuivel, Tuilak, Tuikui, Tuibum
  - right: Tuila, Tuili, Tuiliam

The Tuivai River (also called Tipai River and Tuyai River) originates in Chin Hills in Myanmar and flows through the states of Manipur and Mizoram in India. It is the longest tributary of the Barak River, into which it flows at Tipaimukh near the village Sipuikawn. Sections of the river and its tributaries were used to define the southern border of Manipur facing Mizoram and Chin Hills.

== Name ==
Tuivai means curvy river in Kuki-Chin languages (tui meaning water and vai meaning curved or horizontal). The name has been rendered Tuyai in Meitei language and Tipai in Bengali.

The upper course of the river in the Chin State of Myanmar is called "Cikha stream", Cikha also being the name of the border town by which it flows. British Raj officials also used "Chikoo nullah" for the name of the river.

== Course ==
The Tuivai River originates in Chin Hills in Myanmar, near the Zampi village in the Tonzang Township. It flows north and enters the Manipur state of India near the Chivu salt spring (east of Behiang town). It then follows a zig-zag course winding its way around the longitudinal mountain ranges of Churachandpur district in Manipur and Champhai district in Mizoram, tending west throughout. It joins the Barak River at one of its great bends at Tipaimukh ("mouth of Tipai"). Parts of the course of river as well as those of its tributaries are used as the southern border of Manipur facing Myanmar and Mizoram.

Numerous tributary streams flow into the Tuivai river from both the north and the south. The basin of these rivers essentially defines the western part of the Churachandpur district (the eastern part being in the basin of the Manipur River).

After entering Manipur near Behiang, Tuivai flows north for 28 km and then makes its first 90-degree bends near Zabellei and turns west. At the turning point, it receives a tributary called Tuila River from the north, which originates south of the Thangjing Hills. Tuila was once considered the "Manipur source of Tuivai", but now it is regarded as a tributary. After this junction, Tuivai receives another large tributary called Tuivel from the south, which flows parallel to the northward course of Tuivai itself.

In its westward couse, Tuivai for about 30 km till Dyalkhai, and makes a second 90-degree bend towards south. The location of this bend was also called Tuyai Yirok in the Manipur court chronicle Cheitharol Kumbaba. The Manipur ruler Bhagyachandra (also called Ching-Thang Khomba and Jai Singh) erected a stone here in 1786, to commemorate his victory over the Khongchai village of the Kuki people. (Note: The Khongchai village itself is north of here, in the basin of the Tuipui River.)

The southward course runs for about 28 km. The last 10 km of this course forms the boundary of Manipur with Chin State (part of India–Myanmar border). Then the river makes it third 90-degree bend turning west. At this bend, it receives the Tuisa River from the south, which also marks the boundary between Mizoram and Chin State for 28 km.

The westward course runs for about 28 km, forming the state boundary between Manipur and Mizoram. After this, Tuivai makes its fourth 90-degree bend to turn south into Mizoram. For about 20 km, it forms the district boundary between the Champhai district (to the east) and the Saitual district (to the west). After this, it makes a soft U-turn and flows back north towards Manipur.

Another 90-degree bend makes Tuivai turns west, where it forms Manipur–Mizoram state boundary for about 18 km. After this it makes its last 90-degree bend turning north towards Tipaimukh. This course, about 14 km long, also forms the state boundary between Manipur and Mizoram.

Tipaimukh is at the southern tip of the Vangaitang range, which forms the western periphery of the Manipur state. The Barak River attempting to flow west is blocked by the range, and forced to flow around it. At Tipaimukh, Barak makes an almost U-turn and flows northwest.

== History ==
Most of the course of the Tuivai river was not under the control of Manipur state until 1894. King Gharib Niwaz conquered the Vangaitang range (called "Mangaitang" in Manipur chronicles) from north and is said to have erected a victory stone at Tipaimukh in 1734. King Bhagyachandra conquered the "Khongjai hills" in 1786, erecting a victory stone at Tuyai Yirok. According to the Kuki Research Forum scholars, the ancient trade route of Manipur known as the "Khongjai route" which went between Tipaimukh to Bishnupur via Khongjai hills, formed the border between Manipur and "Kuki Hills".

During the British Lushai Expedition (1871–1872), the Manipur state, which was then a British protectorate, was asked to station troops at Tseklapai in order to guard against the Kamhau-Suktes. The Manipuris exceeded this instruction and stationed troops at Chivu. They also erected a memorial stone of King Chandrakirti at Chivu, which was considered part of the Kamhau-Sukte domain at that time.

== Bibliography ==
- Churachandpur District Census Handbook (PDF), Directorate of Census Operations, Manipur, 2011
- Carey, Bertram S.; Tuck, H. N. (1896), The Chin Hills, Volume I, Government Printing, Burma
  - Carey, Bertram S.; Tuck, H. N. (1983) [1896], The Chin Hills, Volume I, Cultural Publishing House
- Dun, E. W. (1992) [1886], Gazetteer of Manipur, Manas Publications – via archive.org
- Pau, Pum Khan (2019), Indo-Burma Frontier and the Making of the Chin Hills: Empire and Resistance, Taylor & Francis, ISBN 9781000507454
