= Barak River =

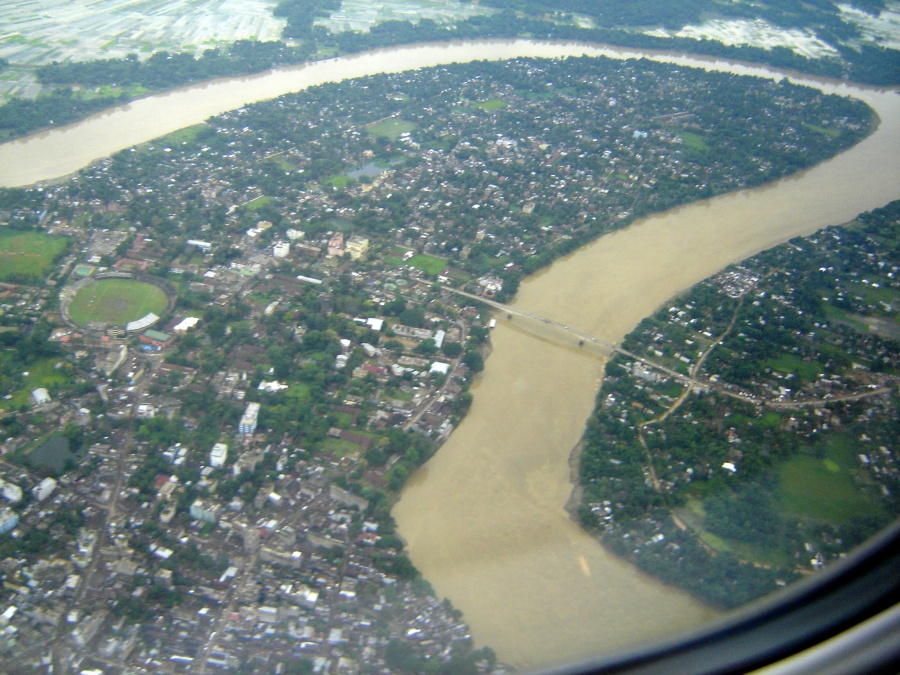
- Barak River winds through Silchar city

Location
- Countries: India and Bangladesh

Physical characteristics
- Source: Liyai Khullen Village
  - location: Khongnem, India
  - coordinates: 25°21′58″N 94°03′48″E
  - elevation: 987 m (3,238 ft)
- Mouth: Bay of Bengal
  - location: Kandigram Chaita, India
  - coordinates: 24°52′35″N 92°29′23″E
  - elevation: 14 m (46 ft)
- Length: 900 km (560 mi)
- Basin size: 52,000 km^{2} (20,000 sq mi)

The Barak River (Bengali: [bɔɾak], Sylheti: [bɔɾax]) is a trans-boundary river in India and Bangladesh. It flows 900 kilometres (560 mi) through the states of Manipur, Mizoram and Assam in India. It flows into Bangladesh where it bifurcates into the Surma River and the Kushiyara River which converge again to become the Meghna River before forming the Ganges Delta. Of its total length, 524 km (326 mi) is in India, 31 km (19 mi) in Bangladesh. The upper part of its navigable part is in India — 121 km (75 mi) between Lakhipur and Bhanga, declared as National Waterway 16, (NW-16) since the year 2016. It drains a basin of 52,000 km^{2} (20,000 sq mi), of which 41,723 km^{2} (16,109 sq mi) lies in India, 1.38% (rounded) of the country. The water and banks host or are visited by a wide variety of flora and fauna.

The principal tributaries are all in India: the Irang, Tuivai, Sonai (or Tuirial), the Jiri, the Tlawng (or Dhaleswari, or Katakal), the Jatinga, the Longai and the Madhura.

Tipaimukh Dam is a proposed dam on the river itself.

== Course ==
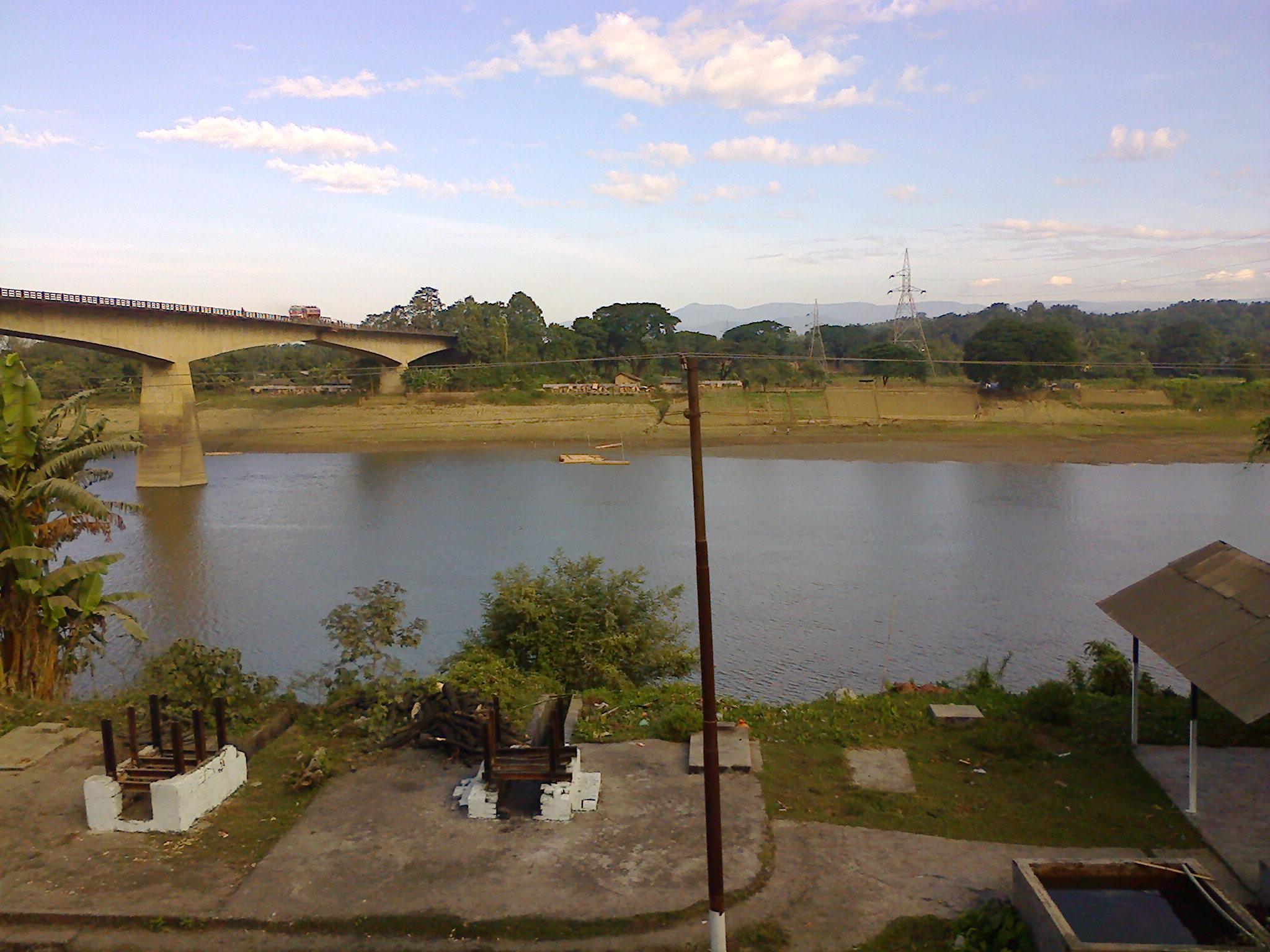
Barak River in Lakhipur, Assam

From its source at Liyai Kullen Village in the Senapati district of Manipur, where most people are of the Poumai Naga tribe, the river is known as Vourei. Near its source, the river receives streams such as the Vehrei originating from Phuba Village, the Gumti, Howrah, Kagni, Senai Buri, Hari Mangal, Kakrai, Kurulia, Balujhuri, Shonaichhari and Durduria.

It flows southwest in Manipur, until Tipaimukh, where it makes an almost 180-degree U-turn. Then it flows north until Jirimukh, and turns west flowing into the Cachar district of Assam. It enters Bangladesh at Bhanga Bazar.

== Main tributaries ==
The local rainfall run off of the valley along with that of adjacent hilly areas flows through river Barak and its various tributaries and is drained out to Bangladesh. The Katakhal(Dhaleshwari), Jiri, Chiri, Modhura, Longai, Sonai, Rukni and Singla are the main tributaries of the valley. The tributaries are mainly rain-fed and cause flood problems when precipitation occurs. The Barak sub-basin drains areas in India, Bangladesh and Burma. The drainage area lying in India is 41723 km^{2} which is nearly 1.38% of the total geographical area of the country. It is on the north by the Barail Range separating it from the Brahmaputra sub-basin, on the east by the Na Lushai hills and on the south and west by Bangladesh. The sub-basin lies in the States of Meghalaya, Manipur, Mizoram, Assam, Tripura and Nagaland.

In Manipur, in its flow south-west to Tipaimukh, it is joined by the Tuivai, and then flows northward to Jirimukh where it is joined by the Jiri river from the north. From here the flow is westward into Cachar, then Karimganj District of Assam, then to Sylhet in Bangladesh having a co-distributary the Surma River, the other later becoming the Meghna before the Ganga-Brahmaputra delta. The Padma joins it to become the Meghna.

== Wildlife ==
The Barak is among the richest rivers in the world as to aquatic biodiversity, as it contains more than 2,000 species of fish. Other creatures include River Barak or Siamese crocodile (a rare and endangered crocodilian), the susu dolphin, smooth-coated otter and black mugger crocodile. From its origin to its bifurcation at the border of Nagaland producing the Surma River the Barak is 564 kilometres (350 mi) long. The entire stretch of the river has various biomes that are extremely rich in wildlife, including:

1. Varzea forest (flooded rainforest)
2. Los llamjao (flooded grassland and Savannah)
3. Tidal forest (mangroves in vast Delta Avourei)
4. Flora or vegetation of the Pats (flat-topped table mountains in India and western Cambodia)
5. Very large tropical swamps.

== Environmental concerns ==
Environmentalists have expressed concern over the way aquatic creatures and their habitats are being destroyed in the upper reaches of river in southern Assam. Prominent nature conservation NGO Society for Activists for Forest and Environment (SAFE) has pointed out that the tribals living on both banks of Barak have developed the harmful practice of blasting small gelatin sticks smuggled from Mizoram to kill fish. In the process, thousands of fish, young and mature, along with turtles, dolphins and other aquatic life organisms are killed.

The Ganges river dolphin is endangered. The proposed Tipaimukh Dam on the river in northeast India – a political controversy between India and Bangladesh – could hasten its extinction, researchers warn. Making a plea for conservation, researchers from Assam state in a study that the dolphin, India's national aquatic animal is heading towards “local extinction” in the river system of the state. “Factors like poaching (for oil and meat) and accidental mortalities in fishing gear, gradual habitat degradation by sluice gates, embankments, disturbances like motorboats and aquatic pollution have resulted in the extirpation of the resident dolphin population from the Barak river system of Assam,” M.K. Mazumder, corresponding author of the study, wrote.

== See also ==
- List of rivers of India
- List of rivers of Bangladesh
