= Seling =

- town
- Location within Mizoram Location within India
- Coordinates: 23°44′0″N 92°51′0″E
- Country: India
- State: Mizoram
- District: Aizawl
- Elevation: 802 m (2,631 ft)

Languages
  - Official: Mizo
- Time zone: UTC+5:30 (IST)
- Vehicle registration: MZ
- Coastline: 0 kilometres (0 mi)
- Website: mizoram.nic.in

Seling is a town in Aizawl district, Mizoram, India.

== Geography ==
It is located at 23°44′0″N 92°51′0″E at an elevation of 802 m above MSL.
