= National Highway 306 (India) =

National highway in India

National Highway 306
- Map of the National Highway 306 in red
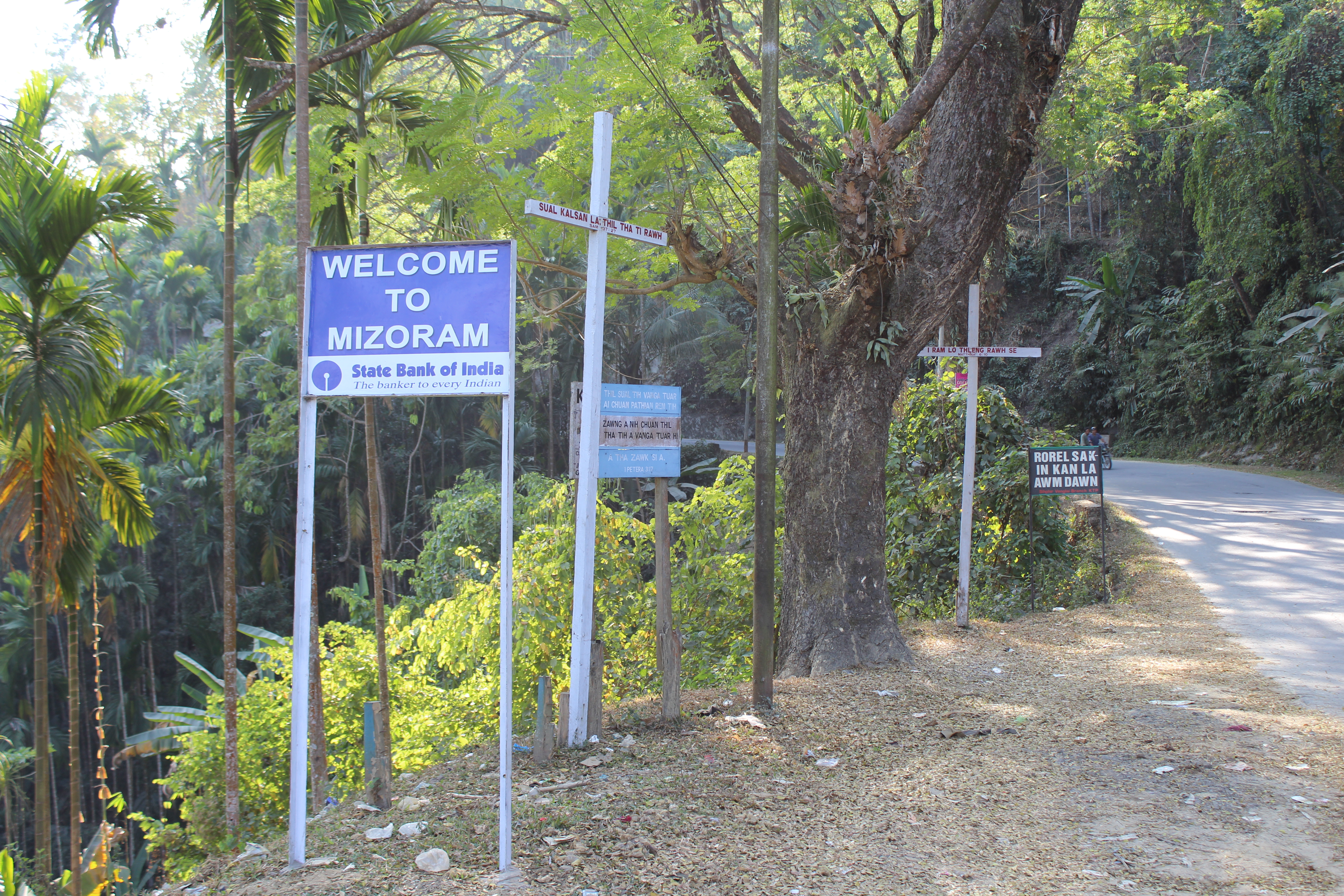
- NH 306 at Assam-Mizoram border

Route information
- Length: 90 km (56 mi)

Major junctions
- From: Silchar, Assam
- To: Kolasib, Mizoram

Location
- Country: India
- States: Assam: 335 km (208 mi); Mizoram: 515 km (320 mi)
- Primary destinations: Silchar - Kolasib

Highway system
- Roads in India; Expressways; National; State; Asian
← NH 54	→ NH 306

National Highway 306 (NH 306) is a 90 km (56 mi) National Highway in the Northeastern Indian states of Assam and Mizoram. NH 306 begins in Silchar, Assam at the intersection of NH 37 and generally runs southward passing through Lumding, Silchar and Kolasib in Mizoram. It was earlier known as NH-54.

== National Highways Development Project ==
- Approximately 90 km (56 mi) stretch of NH 306 between Kolasib and Silchar has been selected as a part of the East-West Corridor by the National Highways Development Project.

== See also ==
- List of national highways in India
- National Highways Development Project
