= National Highway 215 (India) =

National highway in India

National Highway 215

- Schematic map of National Highways in India

Major junctions
- From: Mahadevpur
- To: Dibrugarh

Location
- Country: India
- States: Assam

Highway system
- Roads in India; Expressways; National; State; Asian
| ← NH 52B | → NH 215 |

National Highway 215 (NH 215) is a National Highway in India. It starts from Mahadevpur and terminates at Dibrugarh in the state of Assam.
