= Zünheboto district =

- District of Nagaland
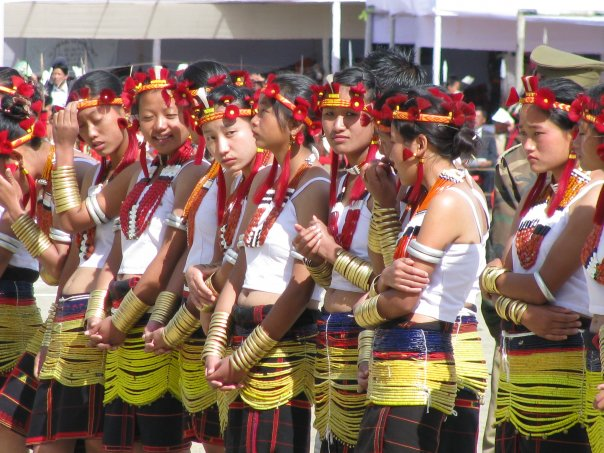
- A Sümi Naga festival in Zünheboto district
- Nickname: Land of Warriors
- Zünheboto District's location in Nagaland
- Coordinates: 26.01°N 94.52°E
- Country: India
- State: Nagaland
- Seat: Zünheboto

Government
  - Assembly constituencies: 7 constituencies

Area
  - Total: 1,255 km^{2} (485 sq mi)
  - Land: 1,200 km^{2} (460 sq mi)
  - Water: 55 km^{2} (21 sq mi) 1.8%

Population (2011)
  - Total: 140,757
  - Density: 120/km^{2} (300/sq mi)
- Time zone: UTC+05:30 (IST)
- Postal code: 798620
- ISO 3166 code: IN-NL-ZU
- Major highways: NH 702A
- Website: http://zunheboto.nic.in/

Zünheboto district (/ˌzʌnˈhiːboʊtoʊ/) is a district in the Indian state of Nagaland. Sümi Nagas are indigenous to this district. The district headquarters is Zünheboto.

== History ==
Zünheboto district came into existence on 19 December 1973.

== Geography ==
It is bordered by Mokokchung District on the north, Tuensang District on the northeast, Kiphire District to the east, Phek District in the south, Kohima District and Tseminyü District to the southwest and Wokha District to the west. The headquarters is located at Zünheboto. A hilly place, Zünheboto is covered by evergreen forests and surrounded by small streams and rivers. It is home to Satoi Range, surrounded by 10 villages of Satakha sub-division, which is a haven for ornithologists and bird-watchers. This range comes under Important Bird Area as well as Endemic Bird Area of India. Many endangered species like Blyth's tragopan, kalij pheasant and peacock-pheasant are still seen in this range.

== Demographics ==
According to the 2011 census, Zünheboto district has a population of 140,757, roughly equal to the nation of Saint Lucia. This gives it a ranking of 598th in India (out of a total of 640). Males (71,217) constitute 51.7% of the population and females(69,540) 48.23%. Zünheboto has a sex ratio of 976 females for every 1000 males, and a literacy rate of 85.3%.(3rd in literacy rate among the districts of Nagaland).

Zünheboto district is home to the Sümi Nagas, one of the Naga warrior tribe. Headhunting was practised extensively until the advent of the Christian missionaries who converted the warriors to Christianity. Today the people are peaceful and hardworking, practising agriculture as their main occupation. The district is also home to one of the largest Baptist church in Asia, the Zünheboto Sümi Baptist Church.

=== Religion ===
Religion in Zünheboto District (2011)
1. Christianity (97.3%)
2. Hinduism (1.83%)
3. Islam (0.55%)
4. Buddhism (0.20%)
5. Sikhism (0.03%)
6. Not stated (0.05%)

According to the 2011 official census, Christianity is major religion in Zünheboto district with 136,995 Christians (97.33%), 2,580 Hindus (1.83%), 772 Muslims (0.55%), 286 Buddhists (0.20%), 39 Sikhs (0.03%), 6 Jains (<0.01%), 77 did not answer (0.05%) and 2 did Other (<0.01%).

== Education ==
Today it is home to the Nagaland University whose campus is situated in the village of Lumami in the sub division of Akuluto. This has become the cultural center for the people of Nagaland, as all the Nagas irrespective of tribes come to study here.

== See also ==
- Atoizu
