= Akuluto =

- Town
- Location of Akuluto in North-East India
- Coordinates: 26.0092901°N 94.5237637°E
- Country: India
- State: Nagaland
- District: Zünheboto District
- Established: 1972

Government
  - Type: Town

Area
  - Total: 12 km^{2} (4.6 sq mi)
  - Rank: 44th in Nagaland
- Elevation: 1,252 m (4,108 ft)

Population (2011)
  - Total: 11,567
  - Rank: 40th in Nagaland & 651 in India
  - Density: 79/km^{2} (200/sq mi)

Languages
  - Official: English
- Time zone: UTC+5:30 (IST)
- Postal code: 798619
- Vehicle registration: NL-06
- Website: http://zunheboto.nic.in

Akuluto is a town and Subdivision in the Zünheboto District of Nagaland, India. There are a total of 10 villages under Akuluto Subdivision. According to 2011 census of India, there are a total of 6,612 people living in this Subdivision, of which 3,408 are male and 3,204 are female. As per the 2021 Aadhaar estimates, the subdivision has a population 8,199.

== Villages under Akuluto Subdivision ==
Akuluto Subdivision has a total of 10 villages.

1. Sumi Settsu
2. Zaphumi
3. Lumami
4. Alaphumi
5. Lumthsami
6. Akuluto
7. Sutemi
8. Shichimi
9. Lotisami (New)
10. Lotisami (Old)

== Climate ==
Average climatic Temperature in Akuluto is 25.7°C.

== Demographics ==
As of 2011 India census, Akuluto had a population of 11,567. Males constitute 51% of the population and females 49%. Akuluto has an average literacy rate of 81%, higher than the national average of 76%: male literacy is 81%, and female literacy is 77%.
