= List of people of Zo descent =

List of notable people of Zo descent

The following is a list of notable Zo people, an umbrella term covering the Mizo, Chin, Kuki, Zomi, Hmar, Lai (Pawi), Mara (Lakher), and related Kuki-Chin language-speaking ethnic groups of Northeast India, western Myanmar and the Chittagong Hill Tracts of Bangladesh.

== Bnei Menashe ==
- Daniel Lhungdim – scholar, songwriter, poet

== Chin ==
- Benjamin Sum – singer and runner-up of Myanmar Idol Season 4
- Cheery Zahau – human rights and women's rights activist, politician, writer and peace leader; founder of the Women's League of Chinland; winner of UNDP's N-Peace Awards (2017)
- Esther Dawt Chin Sung – singer; winner of Myanmar Idol Season 4
- Henry Van Thio – politician; Vice-President of Myanmar (2016–2024)
- Khai Kam Suantak (fl. c. 1867) – chief who ruled over the largest territory in the Chin Hills; Khai Kam College in Kalemyo was named in his honor (later renamed Kale College)
- Lian Hmung Sakhong – politician
- Salai Lian Luai – lawyer, previous Chief Minister of Chin State
- Taik Chun – recipient of the Aung San Thuriya medal, the highest Burmese military award for gallantry
- Thet Mon Myint – actress and two-time recipient of the Myanmar Academy Award
- Zoramthanga (1963-2005) – boxer; bronze medallist at the 1990 Bombay Boxing World Cup

== Hmar ==
- Lal Dena – Manipur and Mizoram historian
- Lalmuanpuia Punte – political advisor to the Chief Minister of Mizoram
- Lalnghinglova Hmar – journalist and football administrator; honorary secretary of the Mizoram Football Association
- Lalremsiami Hmarzote – field hockey player
- Lalthlamuong Keivom – Indian diplomant and writer
- Ngurdinglien Sanate – former Minister of Manipur
- Ngursanglur Sanate – member of the Manipur Legislative Assembly
- Rochunga Pudaite – evangelist and Bible translator; founder of Bibles for the World

== Kuki ==
- Nemcha Kipgen – Deputy Chief Minister of Manipur
- T. N. Haokip – six-time MLA from Saikot; former Manipur cabinet minister and President of the Manipur Pradesh Congress Committee

== Lai (Pawi) ==
- David Van Bik – Lai Bible translator
- Joshua Van – mixed martial artist; UFC Flyweight Champion (2025–present); first Asian-born male UFC champion and second-youngest UFC champion in history
- Lal Thanhawla (see also under Mizo) – whose maternal lineage connects to the Lai community of Lawngtlai

== Mara (Lakher) ==
- Hiphei – politician; seven-time MLA and former Speaker of the Mizoram Legislative Assembly
- K. Beichhua – politician and surgeon; MLA from Saiha

== Mizo ==
=== Politics and public service ===
- A. Thanglura – member of Indian Parliament; first Mizo law graduate
- B. Lalchhanzova – politician and social worker
- Buangi Sailo – writer, poet and composer; Padma Shri (2011)
- Ch. Chhunga – first Chief Minister of Mizoram
- Esther Hnamte – child singer and prodigy
- James Dokhuma – poet, writer and former insurgent; Padma Shri (1985)
- K. Vanlalvena – member of Parliament at the Rajya Sabha
- L. Z. Sailo – writer and former Indian Army captain; Padma Bhushan (2007)
- Lal Thanhawla – longest-serving Chief Minister of Mizoram
- Lalbiakthanga Pachuau – journalist; Padma Shri (2021)
- Laldenga – founder of the Mizo National Front; first Chief Minister of the State of Mizoram
- Lalduhoma – current Chief Minister of Mizoram
- Lalsangzuali Sailo – gospel singer, composer and writer; Padma Shri (1998)
- Laltluangliana Khiangte – playwright and folklorist; Padma Shri (2006)
- Nuchhungi Renthlei – poet, singer and educator; Padma Shri (1986)
- R. Rothuama – member of Indian Parliament
- Sangthankima – social worker; Padma Shri (2024)
- Brigadier Ṭhenphunga "T." Sailo – second Chief Minister of Mizoram; founder of the Mizoram People's Conference; Padma Shri (1999)
- Vanlal Dawla – boxer
- Vandula – chief of the Haulawng subclan
- Ziona – leader of Lalpa Kohhran Thar and Guinness World Records holder of the "world's largest existing family"
- Zoramthanga – former Chief Minister of Mizoram and president of the Mizo National Front

=== Religion, theology and literature ===
- Chuauṭhuama – Presbyterian minister and biblical scholar; first Mizo to earn a degree from Cambridge University; Chief Translator of the Mizo Bible Revised Version project under the Bible Society of India
- Hannah Lalhlanpuii – author and academic
- J. F. Laldailova – writer and officer in the Indian English Army
- Joy L. Pachuau – author and writer
- Lalsawma – social worker, missionary and peace negotiator during the Mizo insurgency; Padma Shri
- Lalzuia Colney – academic and writer; Padma Shri (2010)
- R. Lalthantluanga – former professor of biochemistry and vice chancellor of Mizoram University
- Vankhama – composer and poet
- Zairema – Presbyterian minister and pioneer theologian; first Mizo to obtain the degrees of BSc and BD; completed the first full translation of the Bible into Mizo (1959); remembered as the "father of the Mizoram Synod"

=== Sport ===
- Daniel Lalhlimpuia – footballer
- Jeje Lalpekhlua – footballer and politician
- Jeremy Lalrinnunga – weightlifter; first Indian to win gold at the Youth Olympics; gold medallist at the 2022 Commonwealth Games in the men's 67 kg category
- Jerry Lalrinzuala – footballer
- Jerry Mawihmingthanga – footballer
- Jerry Zirsanga – footballer
- Khawlhring Lalremruata – cricketer
- Lalengmawia Ralte – footballer known as "Apuia"; plays as a midfielder for Mohun Bagan Super Giant and the India national football team; winner of the ISL Emerging Player of the Season award (2020–21); represented India at the 2017 FIFA U-17 World Cup
- Lallianzuala Chhangte – footballer known as the "Mizo Flash"; captain of Mumbai City FC; AIFF Men's Player of the Year (2022–23)
- Lalremsiami – field hockey player; forward for the India women's national field hockey team; first sportsperson from Mizoram to win an Asian Games medal (silver, 2018); Olympian at Tokyo 2020; FIH Rising Star of the Year (2019)
- Lalrindika Ralte – footballer; captain of East Bengal FC
- R. Malsawmtluanga – footballer
- Robert Lalthlamuana – footballer

== Zomi ==
- Chin Sian Thang – former chairman of the Zomi Congress for Democracy
- Khan Thuam – 19th-century Sukte chief; founder of the Sukte paramountcy in the Northern Chin Hills
- Pau Cin Hau – religious leader and creator of the Pau Cin Hau scripts; founder of the Laipian religion
- Thangkhangin Ngaihte – president of the Lok Janshakti Party Manipur State Committee
- Thuam Hang – chief of Khuasak, one of the earliest Christian converts among the Zomi
- Vungzagin Valte – three-time MLA from Thanlon; former cabinet minister in the Government of Manipur

== See also ==
- Zo people
