= Mizo Academy of Letters =

Literary academy for the Mizo language, based in Aizawl, India

- Abbreviation: MAL
- Formation: 23 April 1964
- Headquarters: Aizawl, Mizoram, India
- Official language: Mizo
- Website: mizoacademyofletters.com

The Mizo Academy of Letters (MAL) is a literary organisation based in Aizawl, Mizoram, India, dedicated to the promotion and preservation of literature in the Mizo language. It administers several of the main literary awards for Mizo writers and publishes the monthly literary journal Thu leh Hla.

== History ==
The Mizo Academy of Letters was founded on 23 April 1964. Its founding secretary was J. Malsawma, who served in that role during 1964–65. Mizo is a Tibeto-Burman language that has been written in the Roman script since Christian missionaries introduced it in 1894. The academy has its main office in Aizawl and a joint headquarters in Lunglei. As of 2022 it had 367 members, along with 3 donor members and 58 life members, and oversaw several affiliated literature clubs in Mizoram and Myanmar, including the Mizo Writers Association, SEDAL, Ramhlun Literature Club, Chhimtuipui Academy of Letters, Saitual Literature Club, Lawngtlai Academy of Letters and Letpanchhawng Duhlian Literature Club. In November 2024 the academy marked its diamond jubilee, or 60th anniversary. As part of the celebration it held a book fair from 25 to 29 November 2024, at which about 2,975 books were sold across twelve dedicated publishers' and authors' stalls and a committee stall.

== Publication ==
The academy publishes Thu leh Hla (lit. "Words and Songs"), a monthly literary journal that carries stories, articles, essays, poems and criticism in Mizo. Each issue runs to 48 pages and sells for ₹20, with an annual subscription of ₹200.

== Awards ==
The Mizo Academy Award is presented by the academy to a Mizo writer for a distinguished contribution to Mizo literature. It was first given in 1979, to the writer and historian Rev. Liangkhaia, and has since been awarded at intervals of several years rather than annually. Recipients include James Dokhuma (1983) and Lalthangfala Sailo (2019), the thirteenth recipient of the award.

The Pu Buanga Award is described as the academy's highest literary award. It is named after Rev. J. H. Lorrain, known in Mizo as "Pu Buanga", one of the missionaries who devised the written form of the Mizo language in 1894. First presented in 2000, it was awarded every five years, and every three years since 2015; it carries a cash prize of ₹10,000 with a trophy and citation. Its recipients are Lalsangzuali Sailo (2000), B. Lalthangliana (2005), Laltluangliana Khiangte (2010), Lalthangfala Sailo (2015), R. K. Lalhluna (2018) and R. L. Thanmawia (2022).

The Book of the Year award has been presented annually since 1989 to the best book published in the Mizo language. It carries a cash prize of ₹10,000, a citation and a one-year subscription to Thu leh Hla, with a committee selecting the winner from the Mizo books published in the previous year. Recipients include Lalsangzuali Sailo, for Tlawm ve lo Lalnu Ropuiliani (1999), Lalhruaitluanga Chawngte (2021) and Zohmangaihi (2022).

== See also ==
- Mizo literature
- Mizo language
- Vanglaini
- Sahitya Akademi
