= Mizo Hlakungpui Mual =

Monument in Mizoram, India

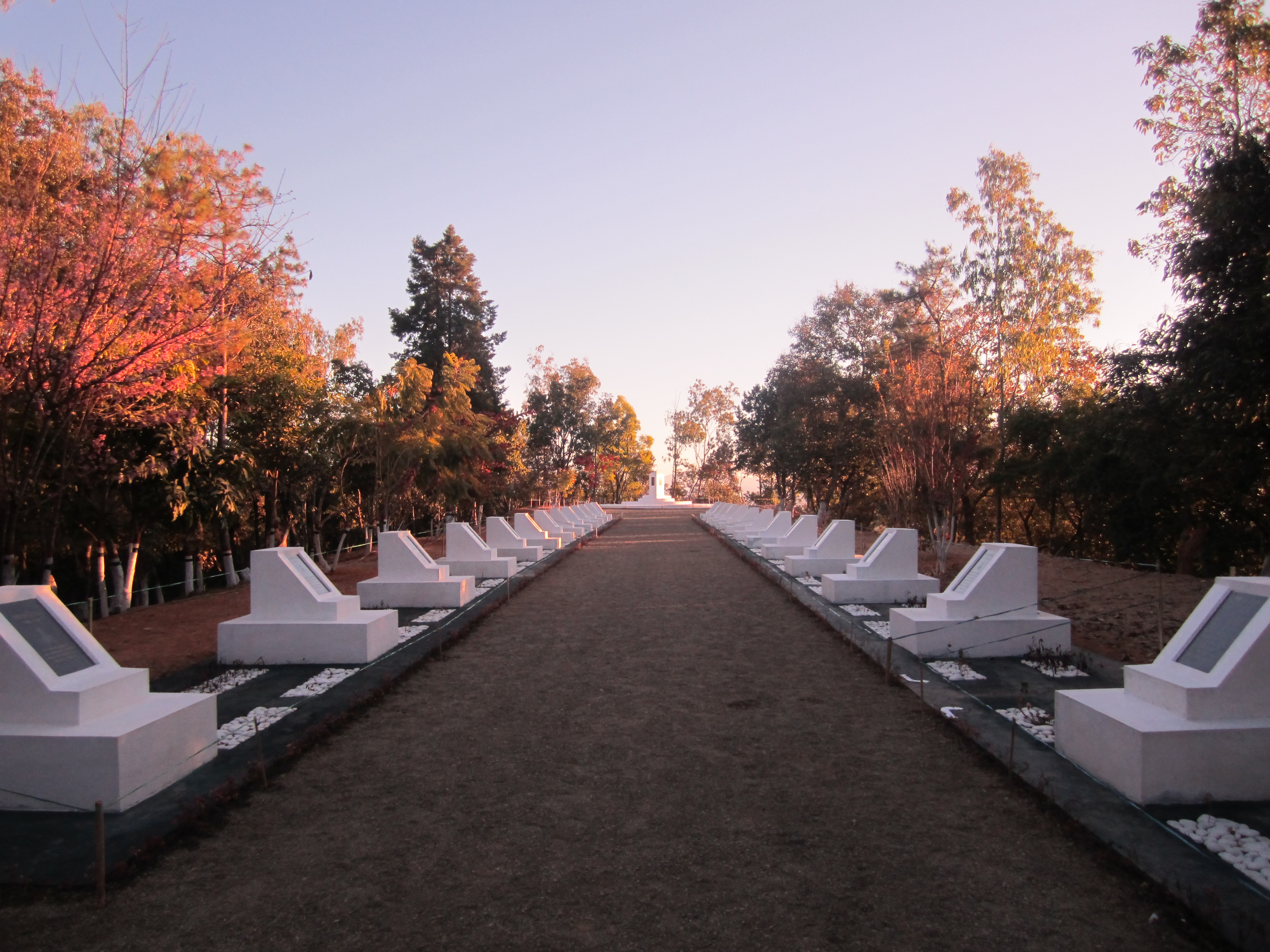
Mizo Hlakungpui Mual in Mizoram

Mizo Hlakungpui Mual (Mizo Poets' Square) is a monument to commemorate Mizo poets. It was set up in 1986 at the southern edge of Khawbung Village, Mizoram state, North-East India, about 100 miles northwest of Chittagong, Bangladesh.

== Origin ==
In time, the local people decided to include all the Mizo Poets and writers who deserved recognition for their contributions to Mizo literature. The Committee agreed, and the selection procedures go as – Writers who have produced at least 3–4 books, and have had a prolonged influence on Mizo literature would be selected while Poets whose songs/poems have exceptional literary value would also be included. Writers/poets may only be included in Hlakungpui Mual five years after their death.

== First Phase 1986 ==
=== Patea (1894–1950) ===
Patea composed 55 poems whose lyrics and harmonies expressed deeply traditional Mizo sentiments. His lyrics are mainly about lamentation, praise and heavenly sentiments.

=== Damhauhva (1909–72) ===
Damhauhva wrote 51 poems highly prized for their literary qualities in Mizo poetry. His poetical words emphasizing natural beauties and its harmonies are well matched. He composed many fine poems. The values of human life with regards to nature are expressed with poetical words.

== Fourth Phase 2011 (Silver Jubilee) ==
The Silver Jubilee of Mizo Hlakungpui Mual was celebrated on 6–7 April 2011 at the Poets' Square site in Khawbung, Mizoram, India.

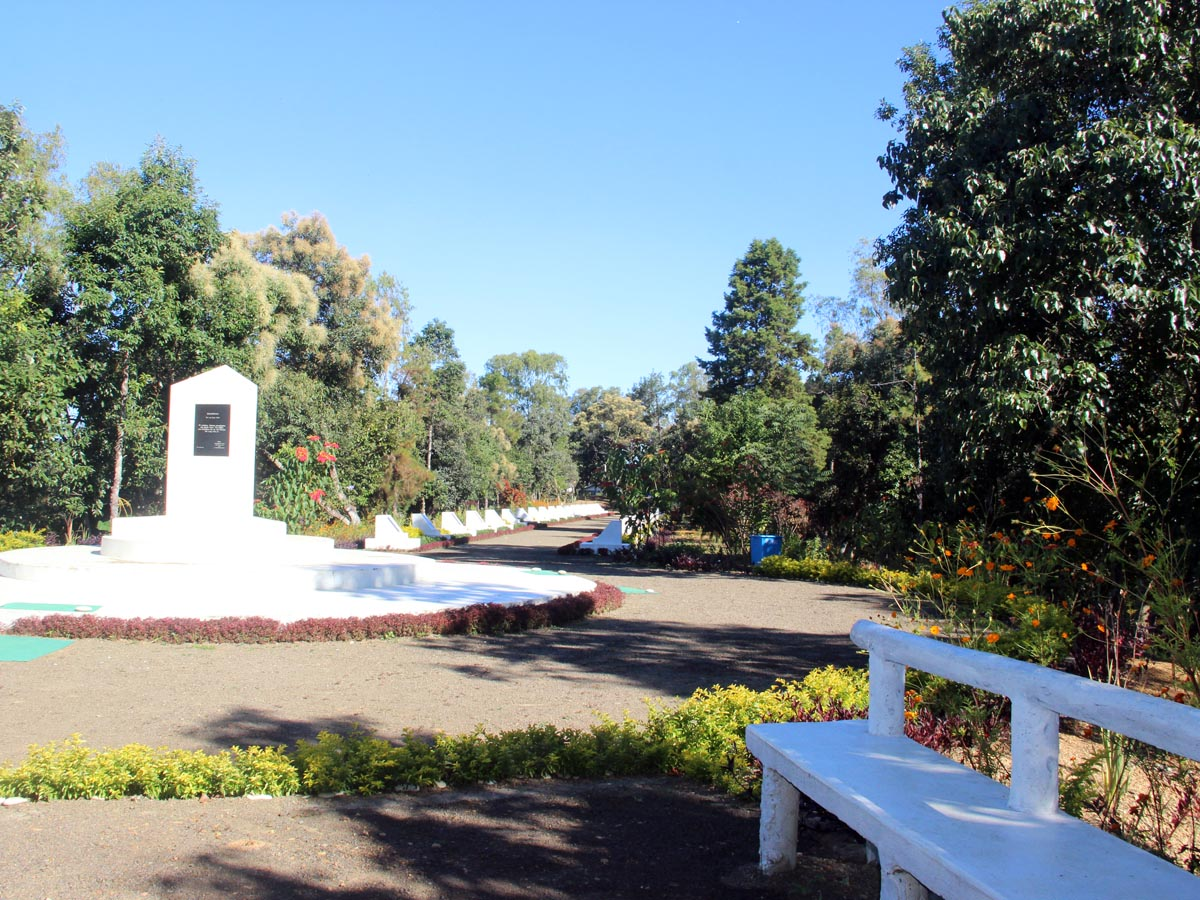
View of Mizo Hlakungpui Mual

=== Writers ===
1. Nuchhungi Renthlei (1914–2006)

=== Poets ===
1. P. S. Chawngthu (1922– 2005)
2. Zirsangzela Hnamte(1952–2002)
3. Rev Thangngura (1891–1943)

== See also ==
- Mizo literature
