= Hmar literature =

Hmar literature primarily refers to the body of literature written in the Hmar language, the principal language of the Hmar people. It may also include literary and academic works on Hmar history, culture, and society written in English, Mizo, or other languages. It includes folktales and folksongs originating from oral traditions, as well as modern forms of written literature that developed following the community's Christianization in the late 19th century in Mizoram. The Hmar language, in which this literature is written, adopted the Roman script during the colonial period. The script was introduced in 1894 by British missionaries, notably Frederick William Savidge and James Herbert Lorrain.

When the linguist G. A. Grierson published Linguistic Survey of India, Volume III, Part III, page 259 contained a translated version of the biblical parable The Prodigal Son in the Hmar language, titled Naupa Tlanhmang. This is regarded as the earliest known example of written Hmar literature.

== Grammar ==
The Hmar alphabet (called Hawrawp) consists of a modified version of the Roman alphabet. They are:

Hmar Hawrawp
A	Aw	B	Ch	D	E	F	G	Ng	H
I	J	K	L	M	N	O	P	R	S
T	Ṭ	U	V	Z					

== Hmar Literature Society ==
The Hmar Literature Society (HLS) was founded under the leadership of Dr. Thanglung on 25 September 1945. Its founding members included Thanglung, Mahajon Hmaipawng, Compounder K. Luoia, and Compounder Nguna.

== Thanglung ==
Thanglung (formally Dr. Thanglung Sanate) is considered as the 'Father of Hmar Literature.' Thanglung developed several early educational books in Hmar language, including Hriselna Kawng (1949), Sierkawp Bu (1950), Geometry Bu (1950), Leihnuoi Ram Thu (1951) and Dictionary (1952).

== Oral literature ==
=== Folk songs ===
Early folk songs
Sikpuilam Hla	Chawnlam Hla	Lamlam Hla	Ruolhlui Hla	Liendang Hla
Muchiei Hla	Kawlngo Hla	Chawngngo Hla	Kelkhuong Hla	Chawnhnieng Hla
Bapuinu Hla	Chawnhmuok Hla	Tlangzai Hla	Tuoilur Nu Tap Hla	Semruk Hla
Tuoni Hla	Thlangtlak Hla	Butu Khuonglawm	Ralngam le Dawikungpui Indawituona Hla	Zawltling Hla
Sawlthona Hlado	Ral Hlado	Savawm Hlado	Naufahra Hlado	Sikpuilam Hla (Saia Ketet Hla)
Hranglam Hla	Darlam Hla	Salulam Hla		

The Sikpui Hla is one of the most well-known folk songs of the Hmar people. It recounts a purported exodus of the community and has been interpreted by some as linking the Hmar people to a "lost" tribe of Israel. However, this interpretation has been widely rejected by scholars.

SIKPUI HLA
Sikpui inthang kan ur laia,
Chang tuipui aw, senma hrili kang intang.
Kera lâwn a, ka leido aw
Sunah sum ang, zânah mei lâwn invâk e.
Ân tûr a sa, thlu a ruol aw,
In phawsiel le in râl feite zuong thaw ro.
Sunra zûla, ka leido aw,
Ke ra lâwn a, meisûm ang lâwn invâk e
Sun ra zula, ka leido aw,
Laimi sa ang chang tuipuiin lem zova
A varuol aw la ta che,
Suonglung chunga tuizuong put kha la ta che.

While we are preparing for the Sikpui feast,
The big red sea becomes divided.
As we are marching forward fighting our foes,
We are being led by a cloud during day;
And by pillar of fire during night.
Our enemies, ye folk are thick with fury,
Come out with your shields and spears.
Fighting our foes all day,
We march along as cloud-fire goes afore.
The enemies we fight all day,
The big sea swallowed them like beast.
Collect the quails,
Drink the water that gushes out of the rock.

== Written literature ==
=== Early prints ===
Author	Title of Book	Year	Medium
H.L. Sela	Bu Hmasa	1928	Hmar
Thanglung	Thuthlung Thar	1946	Hmar
Thanglung	Hriselna Kawng	1948	Hmar
Thanglung	Sierkawp Bu	1948	Hmar
Thanglung	Geometry Bu	1946	Hmar
Thanglung	Thanglung's Dictionary	1950	Hmar
Thanglung	Leihnuoi Ram Thu	1946	Hmar
H. Thanglora	Pherzawl Reader	1958	Hmar

=== Poetry collections ===
Author/Editor	Title of Book	Year	Publisher	Medium
L. Keivom & Lalparlien	Thralai Hlabu	1961	-	Hmar
H.V. Vara	Hmar Hla Hlui (The Hmar Folk Songs, Lyrics And Chants)	1967 (1st Edition), 1985 (Revised & Enlarged)	Self	Hmar
R. Tawna Khawbung	Lenruol Hlabu	1979 (First Edition), 2005 (Revised and Enlarged Edition)	Dr. Rosiem Pudaite & R Tawna Khawbung	Hmar
L. Keivom	Hmar Hla Suina (Hmar History, Culture & Literature)	1980	-	Hmar
L. Chongtho Hmar	Hmar Hai Trobul Hlabu Pakhatna (Hmar Traditional Songs Book-I)	1987	Self	Hmar
Rev. H.V. Sunga & H.V. Vara	Hmar Hlaphuoktuhai (The Hmar Poets)	1989	H.V. Vara	Hmar
Immanuel Zarzosang Varte & Lalthakim Hmar	Highland Musings	2016	IndigeNE, Imphal, Manipur	English
Immanuel Zarzosang Varte & Lalthakim Hmar	Sinlung Sermei	2016	IndigeNE, Imphal, Manipur	Hmar
Thangsawihmang	Hmar Hla, Hla Lenglawng le Lengzem Hla Suina	2016	Tribal Research Institute, Manipur	Hmar

=== Song books/Commentary [Hla Bu/Hla Suina] ===
Author/Editor	Title of Book	Year	Publisher	Medium
L. Keivom	Hmar Hla Suina (Hmar History, Culture & Literature)	1980	-	Hmar
L. Keivom	Hmar Hla Suina(Hmar History, Culture & Literature)	2017	James Keivom	Hmar

=== Non-fiction [history/genealogies] ===
Author	Title of Book	Year	Publisher/Place	Medium
Rochunga Pudaite	The Education of the Hmar People	1963	Indo-Burma Pioneer Mission, Churachandpur, Manipur	Hmar
L. Hranglien Songate	Hmar Chanchin (History of the Hmar)	1977	L. Rokung	Hmar
H.B. Hrangchhuana	Hmar Chanchin (Hmar History)	1984	HSA Aizawl JHQ, Mizoram	Mizo
Ngurthangkhum Sanate	Ngurte Pahnam Chanchin	1984	Churachandpur, Manipur	Hmar
Darliensung	The Hmars	1988	-	English
F.T. Hminga	Hmar Pipu Thilhming Lo Phuokhai	1988	Self, Churachandpur, Manipur	English
F.T. Hminga	Hming Umzie Neihai	1994	Self, Churachandpur, Manipur	English
H. Thuomte	Joute Pahnam Inthladan (Joute Genealogy)	2001	Churachandpur, Manipur	Hmar
H. Zaneisang	Sinlung	2003	Self, Churachandpur, Manipur	Hmar
Various	Lal Remruot – Saidan Chanchin	2008	Hmanglien & Sons, Rai's Ad-venture, Delhi	Hmar
Vanlal Tluonga Bapui	Oral Traditions of the Hmars	2011	Assam Institute of Research For Tribals and Scheduled Castes: Guwahati, Assam.	English
S.N. Ngurte	Dawntitam	-	-	Hmar
Thangsawihmang	Ka Hriet Nuom Zawng	-	-	Hmar
John H. Pulamte	Hmar Bûngpui Pastor Thangngur	2011	Self, Imphal, Manipur	Hmar
Darthangluoi Faihriem	Sikpui Ruoi			Hmar
Thangsawihmang	Tlangram Nun	2012	Self, Rengkai, Manipur	Hmar
Hrilrokhum Thiek	History of the Hmars in North East India	2013	Bhabani Offset Private Ltd., Guwahati, Assam	English
Ngurrivung	Hung Ro Indinthar Nawk Ei Tiu	2016	-	Hmar
Immanuel Zarzosang Varte & Lalthakim Hmar	Highland Musing	2016	IndigeNE, Imphal, Manipur	Hmar
Ngurrivung	Hnam Rolung 2015-2016 Rochunga Pudaite	2016	Self, Lois Bet, Aizawl, Mizoram	Hmar
J.C. Chongkholien	Rengkai Lal - Kailien: A Khawsathai le a Thlahai.	2021	Self, Rengkai, Manipur	Hmar
Lal Dena	The Hmar Culture Relics: Historical Monuments in Pherzawl District	2025	Hmar Art and Culture Society, Churachandpur, Manipur	English & Hmar
Fimlienvung Keivom	Keivom Hnam Chanchin (The Original Story of the Keivom Clan)	-	-	Hmar

=== Novels ===
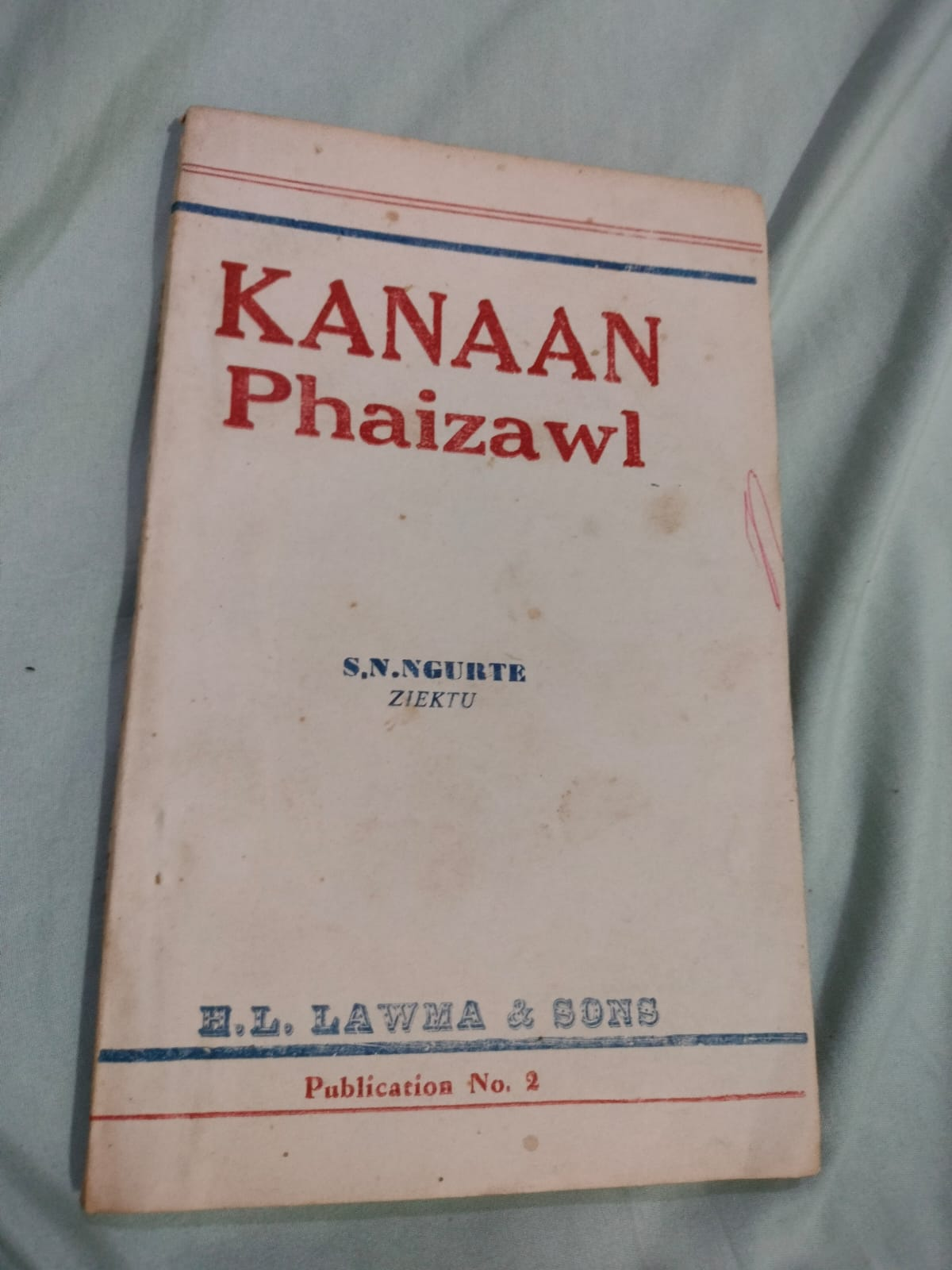
"Kanaan Phaizawl" (1995) by S.N. Ngurte

Author	Title of Book	Year	Publisher	Medium
L. Keivom	Lalnunnem Ka Ngai Em Che	1974	-	Hmar
L. Keivom	Zawngkhaw Bungbu	1974	-	Hmar
J Batlien	Lenglai Ni	1984	-	Hmar
S.N. Ngurte	Lenlai Chan	1989	Sinlung Society Publication, Churachandpur, Manipur	Hmar
S. N. Ngurte	Mi Ngaidam Rawh I	1990	Self, Churachandpur, Manipur	Hmar
S. N. Ngurte	Damlai Thlaler	1991	Sinlung Society Publication, Churachandpur, Manipur	Hmar
S. N. Ngurte	Mi Ngaidam Rawh II	1991	Sinlung Society Publication, Churachandpur, Manipur	Hmar
S. N. Ngurte	Pieral Nisa	1992	Sinlung Society Publication, Churachandpur, Manipur	Hmar
S. N. Ngurte	Thina Varal	1993	Sinlung Society Publication, Churachandpur, Manipur	Hmar
S.N. Ngurte	Rengchawnghawi	1994	L. Rokung	Hmar
S.N. Ngurte	Kanaan Phaizawl	1995	Phira & Pienga for HL Lawma & Sons Publication, Churachandpur, Manipur	Hmar
S.N. Ngurte	Thla Hleitling Zan	1996	Phira & Pienga for HL Lawma & Sons Publication, Churachandpur, Manipur	Hmar
S.N. Ngurte	Hermon Daidaw	1996	Churachandpur, Manipur	Hmar
S.N. Ngurte	Hringnun Khawvel	1997	PT Publication Centre, Churachandpur, Manipur	Hmar
S.N. Ngurte	Singpui	1998	-	Hmar
S.N. Ngurte	Nunkhawpham	1999	H.A. Lalrohlu, Churachandpur, Manipur	Hmar
S.N. Ngurte	Lungrunpui	2000	Self, Rengkai, Churachandpur, Manipur	Hmar
S.N. Ngurte	Dâwntitam	2017	Self, Rengkai, Churachandpur, Manipur	Hmar
Thangsawihmang	Hmangaina Parbawr	2012	-	Hmar
V.L. Renga	Chantawk (I)	2012	Sin-leng Publication	Hmar
V.L. Renga	Chantawk (II)	2013	Sin-leng Publication	Hmar
S.N. Ngurte	Chawngngo, Zochung Lanu Hmeltha	2018	Hmar Literature Society; Churachandpur, Manipur	Hmar
L.B. Tuolte	Zawllai a Thlunglu Lemchang	-	-	Hmar
V.L. Renga	Thawnthu tawi thlangkhawm	2025	-	Hmar
Piani Hmar	Rolung	2025	Sinlung Academy of Letters	Hmar

=== Dictionaries ===
Author	Title of Book	Year	Publisher	Medium
T.K Buongpui	Hmarram Dictionary	2010	L.C Buongpui, Churachandpur, Manipur	English-Hmar
J Lungawi	English-Hmar Dictionary	-	-	English-Hmar
John H Pulamte	Pherzawl Diksawnari	2020	Sinlung Academy of Letters	Hmar-English
Rochunga Pudaite	English-Hmar Dictionary	2008	Partnership Publishing House, Manipur	English-Hmar

=== Grammar and language guide books ===
Author	Title of Book	Year	Publisher	Medium
F.T. Hminga	Hmar Ṭawng Indiklem	1993	Self, Churachandpur, Manipur	Hmar
Vanlal Tluonga Bapui	Hmar Grammar	1996	Central Institute of Indian Languages. CIIL Press, Mysore	English
Vanlal Tluonga Bapui	Hmar Ṭawng Inchukna (A Lexical Study of the Hmar Language & Usages)	2012	The Assam Institute of Research for Tribals and Scheduled Castes. Hi-Tech Printing & Binding Industries, Guwahati, Assam	Hmar
S.N Ngurte	Hmar Thumal Trobul (Etymological Dictionary)	2013	Self, Churachandpur, Manipur	Hmar
S.N Ngurte	Hmar Tawng Lamkei: 78 Upa Tawngkasuok	2016	Hmar Literature Society, Churachandpur, Manipur	Hmar

=== Instructional textbooks ===
Author	Title of Book	Year	Publisher	Medium
Zokapsang Lungtau	Sierkawp	2025	-	Hmar

=== Autobiographies and biographies ===
Author	Title of Book	Year	Publisher/Place	Medium
Dony Tuolte	Ka Tawnhriet (Vol I)	2017	Self, Churachandpur, Manipur	Hmar
Dony Tuolte	Ka Tawnhriet (Vol 2)	-	-	Hmar
Chaltonlien Amo	Ka Khuolzinna Lamtluong	2025	Self, Churachandpur, Manipur	Hmar
L Rokung	Ka Nun	-	Self	Hmar

== Christian literature ==
=== Devotional ===
Author	Title of Book	Year	Publisher	Medium
C.C. Rema	Nghaisan Bo Kohran	1960	-	Hmar
C.C. Rema	Sandam Inhrietchiengna	1971	-	Hmar
Jonathan Pudaite	Beyond The Next Mountain: The Story of Rochunga Pudaite	1982	Tyndale House Publishers, US	English
Ruolneikhum Pakhuongte	The Power of the Gospel Among the Hmar Tribe	1983	Ri Khasi Press, Shillong	English
H.C. Hrangate	Pathien Kut	1996	-	Hmar
Hrilrokhum Thiek	Maichâma Mei Chu Sukchawk Zing Ding A Nih	1996		Hmar
Lalthankhum Sinate	Kohran Hring	2001	-	Hmar
C.C. Rema	Nupa Hlimna Thuruok	2004	-	Hmar
C.C. Rema	Kristien Kalchawibu (transl.)	2009	-	Hmar (transl. from English; a book by Peter Jeffrey)
Lalhmuoklien	Gospel Through Darkness	2009	Self, Churachandpur, Manipur	Hmar
C.C. Rema	Isu Krista Hung Nawkna	2011	-	Hmar
Darsanglien Ruolngul	Kohran	2013	Self, Churachandpur, Manipur	Hmar
C.C. Rema	Isu Krista Hung Nawkna	2011	-	Hmar
C.C. Rema	Biblea Pathien mihai nungchang Inchukna	2014	-	Hmar
C.C. Rema	Krista Ka Iengkim	2015	-	Hmar
C.C. Rema	Ringtu Khuolzin	2016	-	Hmar
Darsanglien Ruolngul	The Advance of the Gospel (Part 1)	-	-	English
Lalrothar	Hringnun Khawvel Thar	-	-	Hmar
H.M. Songate	A Lunginsietna Zar Chauin	-	-	Hmar
L Fimate	Thina Rapthlak	2021	Self, Guwahati, Assam, India	Hmar
Thangsawihmang	Khawvel Hun Tawng	2021	Ramthienghlim Varte, Shillong, Meghalaya	Hmar
C. C. Rema	Vanram Ei Tlung Phaleh	2022		Hmar
Thangngur	Damlai Tuipui Chungah	2024	Independent Church of India, Churachandpur, Manipur	Hmar
Vanlalhlun Faiheng	I Kross Inkhawkpui Rawh	2025	-	Hmar
Jonathan Infimate	Indigenous Theology: A Study of Pastor Thangngur's Hymns in the context of Paul Hiebert Fourth's Self-Theology	-	-	English
Jami Darngawn	Lalpa Mi Pawlna	-	-	Hmar

=== Bible versions ===
Author	Title of Book	Year	Publisher	Medium
L. Keivom	Baibul (Hmar)-Holy Bible, Delhi Version	2007	-	Hmar

=== Commentaries and guide books ===
Author	Title of Book	Year	Publisher	Medium
C.C. Rema	Genesis Hrilfiena	1966	-	Hmar
C.C. Rema	Nambars Hrilfiena	1970	-	Hmar
Darsanglien Ruolngul	Chanchintha Matthai Hrilfiena	1975	-	Hmar
C.C. Rema	Amos Hrilfiena	1979	-	Hmar
C.C. Rema	Chanchintha Johan Hrilfiena	1980	-	Hmar
Darsanglien Ruolngul	Thilthawhai Hrilfiena	1982	-	Hmar
C.C. Rema	Hebrai Hrilfiena	1991	-	Hmar
C.C. Rema	Genesis Hrilfiena (HCLF)	1991	-	Hmar
Darsanglien Ruolngul	Ruthi Bu Inchukna	1994	-	Hmar
Darsanglien Ruolngul	Zawlnei Isai Inchukna (Part 1)	2002	-	Hmar
Darsanglien Ruolngul	Leveticus Hrilfiena	2008	-	Hmar
Darsanglien Ruolngul	Juda Lekhathawn Inchukna	2011	-	Hmar
Darsanglien Ruolngul	Ruthi Bu Inchukna	2011	-	Paite (transl.)
Darsanglien Ruolngul	Rom Mihai Kuoma Tirko Paula Lekhathawn Suina	2011	-	Hmar

== Academic studies ==
The following literature covers only academic works specific to the Hmar people.

=== Doctoral theses ===
Author	Title of Book	Year	Institution	Department
John H. Pulamte	Development of Education in Churachandpur District (with Special Reference to the Hmars)	2002	Manipur University	Political Science
Immanuel Zarzosang Varte	Impact of Development on the Hmars of Tipaimukh in Churachandpur District, Manipur	2010	North Eastern Hill University	Anthropology
Lalthakim Hmar	Role of Women in the Expressive Behaviors of the Hmars of Assam	2013	Tezpur University	Cultural Studies
Shilo Lalhlanzo Parate	Ethnic Conflict and Its Impact on Marginalized Communities: A Study on the Hmars of Dima Hasao District of Assam	2016	Assam University, Silchar	Political Science
Marina Laltlinzo Infimate	Clause structure in Hmar	2021	North Eastern Hill University	Linguistics
Ruth Hmingchullo	Mediatization and Cultural Transformation of the Hmar Community in Manipur	2022	Assam University, Silchar	Mass Communication
Lalsangzuali Tuolor	Patriarchal Resistance: A Study of Hmar Women As Represented in Select Folktales and Songs	2023	Mizoram University	English & Cultural Studies
Marina L. Hrangkhol	Documentation of Indigenous Knowledge on Handloom Products and Attires of the Hmar Tribe of North East India	2026	North Eastern Hill University	Library & Information Science

=== Book Chapters ===
Author	Title of Chapter	Book	Editor(s)	Year	Publisher
Teresa L. Khawzawl	Language and Identity Politics: The Case of Hmar in Northeast India	Communities, Institutions, and Histories of India's Northeast	Charisma K. Lepcha & Uttam Lal	2022	Routledge, Taylor & Francis

=== Peer-reviewed research articles ===
Author	Title of Book	Year	Publisher	DOI/ISSN
Crossthang Sanate	Family And Kinship Among The Hmar Society	2014	Research Journali's Journal of Sociology	2347-8241
Immanuel Zarzosang	Revisiting Sikpui Ruoi of the Hmar Tribe	2016	Anthropology Today	2454-2709
Vanlal Tluonga Bapui	Teaching of Hmar Language with Special Reference to Assam	2017	Language and Language Teaching	
Abigail Lalnuneng & Others	Rural-urban differences in hypertension among the Hmars of Manipur in Northeast India	2017	The Anthropologist	10.1080/09720073.2017.1349627
Marina Laltlinzo Infimate & Others	Passivization in Hmar	2019	Language in India	1930-2940
Margaret L Khawbung	Traditional Institutions of the Hmar Tribe in Northeast India	2021	KANCHIOLI (Journal of Humanities and Social Sciences)	2583-0740
Marina Laltlinzo Infimate	Causativization in Hmar	2022	Himalayan Linguistics	https://doi.org/10.5070/H921255411
Hosea Lalremruot	Tlawmngaina: A Study of Its Transition from Hmar Traditional Society to Hmar Modern Society	2022	International Journal of Social Sciences & Cultural Studies	2347-4777
Abigail Lalnuneng	Age variation in blood pressure: Rural–urban and sex differences among the Hmar adults of Manipur, Northeast India	2022	American Journal of Human Biology	https://doi.org/10.1002/ajhb.23656
Vanthangpui Khobung	Youth dormitory for learning in traditional Hmar society	2023	Gap Bodhi Taru: A Global Journal of Humanities	
Abigail Lalnuneng	Correlates of Body Fat Mass Index (FMI) and Fat Free Mass Index (FFMI) with Hypertension in the Hmar Tribes of Northeast India	2024	Journal of Hypertension	10.1097/01.hjh.0001021772.71295.96
C. Vanlalawmpuia	Tawngkasuok: Traditional Sayings of the Hmar People	2024	Mizoram University	2395-7352
Diana L. Senate	Continuity And change in Hmar Death Rituals and Afterlife Beliefs: A Study of Pre-and Post-Christian Influences	2025	Edumania-An International Multidisciplinary Journal	https://doi.org/10.59231/edumania/9149
Abigail Lalnuneng	Is BMI Enough? Body Composition Profiles and Cardiometabolic Risk in Hmar Tribe of Northeast India	2025	Journal of Racial and Ethnic Health Disparities, Springer Nature	https://doi.org/10.1007/s40615-025-02698-x
Marina L Hrangkhol & Others	Hmar Customary Rituals with Reference to the Wedding and Funeral Rites: A Documentation	2025	Cuestiones de Fisioterapia	3790-3803
Raphaela Lalsanhim & Others	The Zawlbuk Institution In Hmar Traditional Education: Its Role And Contemporary Relevance	2025	IJCRT†	2320-2882
Diana L. Sanate	Superstitions in Traditional Hmar Society: Origins, Roles, and Cultural Significance	2025	IJSDR†	2455-2631
C. Vanlalawmpuia & Others	Conceptualising ‘Sinlung’ as the ‘Imagined homeland’ of the Hmar tribe: myth or history?	2026	Asian Ethnicity	https://doi.org/10.1080/14631369.2026.2645646
Joseph R. Joute	Colonization and the Emergence of Church Governance: Revisiting The Case of Hmar Church	2026	Biblical Studies Journal	https://doi.org/10.54513/BSJ.2026.8203

†Although the discussions are relevant, they may be flagged as Predatory publishing.

=== Masters' dissertations ===
Author	Title of Book	Year	Publisher	Department
Robert L Sungte	Impact of Religious Journals on the Hmar tribe in Manipur	2007	Mangalore University	Mass Communication
