= Buangi Sailo =

Indian writer from Mizoram

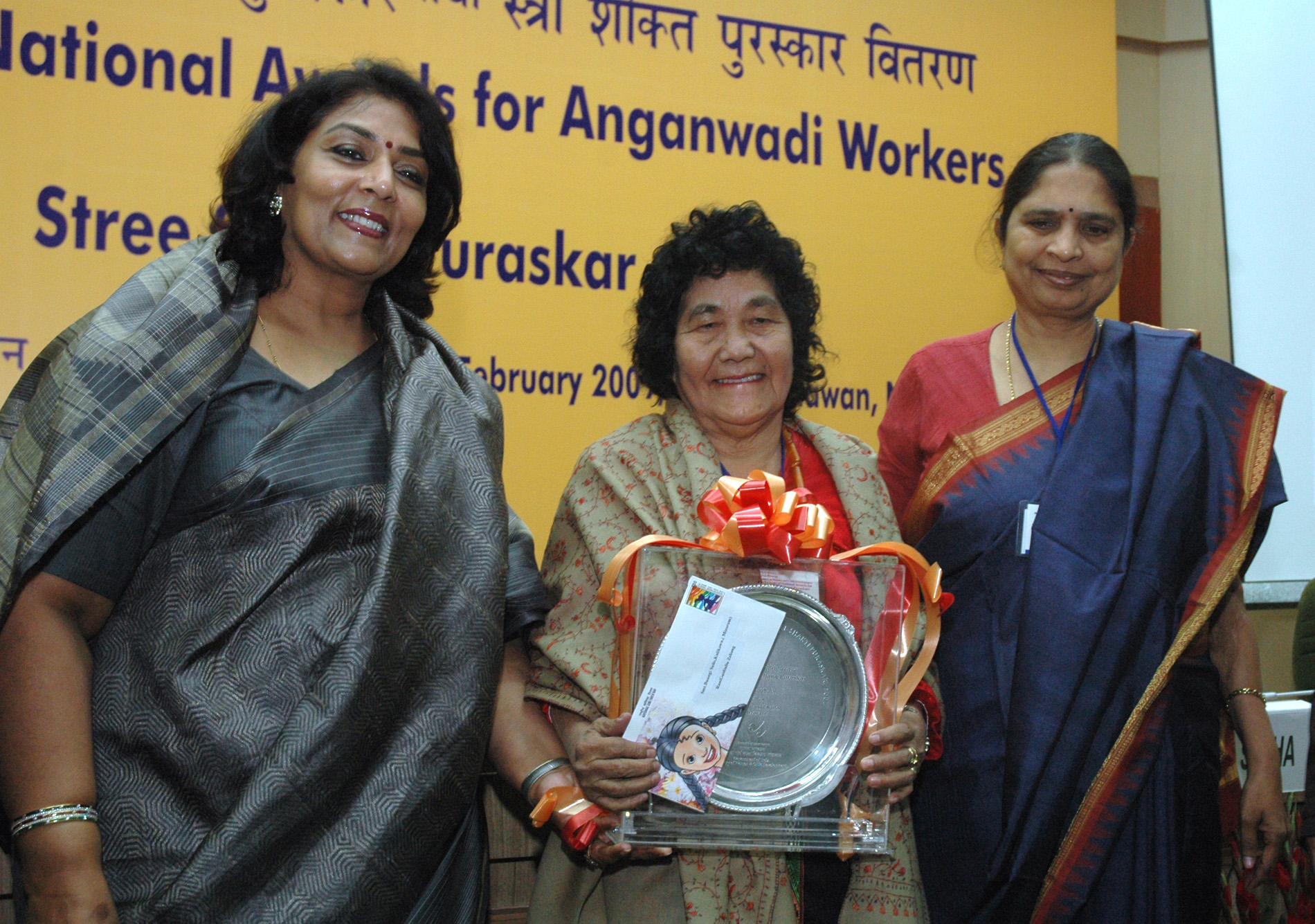
- Buangi Sailo (center) accepting Stree Shakti Puraskar in New Delhi on February 28, 2009
- Born: c. 1929; Mizoram, India
- Died: 18 June 2012 (aged 82); Aizawl, Mizoram, India
- Occupations: Journalist; Editor
- Known for: Pioneering Mizo literature
- Awards: Padma Shri (2011)

Buangi Sailo (c. 1929 – 18 June 2012) was an Indian writer, poet, and composer from Mizoram, known for her contributions to Mizo literature, education, and the documentation of Mizo history and culture. She was a recipient of Padma Shri, India's fourth-highest civilian award, in 2011 and the Stree Shakti Puraskar in 2009.

== Personal life ==
Sailo resided in the Tuikual North locality of Aizawl, the capital of Mizoram. Her songbook, Zoram Rose Par, was dedicated to her youngest daughter, Maria Zoremmawii (also known as Nauteii), who died in 2000.

The Sailo surname is associated with several other Padma award recipients from Mizoram, including Captain L.Z. Sailo and Brigadier Thenphunga Sailo. Buangi Sailo authored a book specifically on the history of the Sailo lineage. Buangi Sailo died on 18 June 2012 at her residence in Aizawl, Mizoram at the age of 82.

== Career and contributions ==
Sailo's work encompasses historical writing and poetry, primarily in the Mizo language (Lushai dialect using Roman script).

=== Literature and history ===
In 2011, Sailo published Sailo thlah chhawng chanchin (History of Sailo Descendants/Lineage). This book, written in Lushai and published in Aizawl, contains biographical information and a chronology of Mizo tribal chiefs, with a particular focus on the Sailo lineage. Another book titled Mizo nunhlui leh tunlai (Mizo Past and Present) is also attributed to her.

=== Music and poetry ===
Sailo is recognized as a composer. Her songbook Zoram Rose par was launched in Aizawl in July 2011 and contains 155 songs composed by her. An earlier work, likely a collection of poems or songs, titled Nghilhlohna Nuaithangpar (roughly translating to 'Unforgettable Myriad Flowers'), is also attributed to her.

One of her known individual songs is "Di Hmeltha". This song has been performed by other Mizo artists and has been included in the curriculum or reading materials at educational institutions.

=== Education and social work ===
Sailo received the Padma Shri award for "Literature and Education". Her historical and cultural writings, along with the use of her songs in educational settings, contribute to this aspect of her work. She has also been acknowledged for contributions to social work. In one instance, she presented an award on behalf of the Universal Hindi Communications Centre (UHCC) during an event promoting Hindi in Mizoram.

== Awards and recognition ==
- Stree Shakti Puraskar (2007): Awarded by the Ministry of Women & Child Development, Government of India. Sailo received the award in the Rani Gaidinliu Zeliang category at a ceremony in New Delhi on February 28, 2009.
- Padma Shri (2011): Awarded by the Government of India for contributions to Literature and Education.

== Works ==
- Sailo thlah chhawng chanchin (Book, 2011)
- Zoram Rose par (Songbook, 2011)
- Nghilhlohna Nuaithangpar (Poetry/Song Collection, c. 2003)
- Mizo nunhlui leh tunlai (Book, 2001)

=== As a composer ===
- Di Hmeltha
- Di mampui
