= Jim Denevan =

American artist and businessman (born 1961)

- Born: James F. Denevan; June 27, 1961 (age 65); Santa Clara County, California, US
- Known for: Sculpture; Land art Earthworks
- Notable work: Vancouver Sculpture Biennale; Lake Baikal Russia
- Movement: Land art Earthworks
- Patrons: The Anthropologist; Vancouver Sculpture Biennale
- Website: jimdenevan.com

James F. Denevan (born June 27, 1961) is an American artist and businessman. As an artist, he creates temporary land art. He is also the founder of Outstanding in the Field, a traveling farm dinner series.

== Biography ==
Denevan was born on June 27, 1961, in Santa Clara County, California. The passion for land art came to him when surfing. He realized how the beaches were empty canvases, and felt urged to put something there.

In March 2010, Denevan was commissioned by The Anthropologist to create a large scale drawing on Lake Baikal. The drawing is the world's largest single artwork. A documentary of the journey and artwork called Art Hard was released in 2011. The short version of the film premiered at the Hamptons International Film Festival and was also accepted at the Carmel Art and Film Festival, DocNYC Film Festival, Milwaukee Short Film Festival and ION International Film Festival.

== Work ==
Denevan works with natural materials to create massive scale drawings in sand, ice, and soil. His sculptures are not placed in the landscape, rather, the landscape is the means of their creation. His process goes beyond drawing and implies a spiritual land-finding process.

Denevan uses a stick and a rake to draw on sand. His creations usually last a few hours before being washed away by the tides. Aerial photography or video is needed to comprehend the final work.

Denevan's most recent notable work was commissioned by the clothing brand Stüssy. The work of art is featured on a T-shirt, highlighting the features of the northern California coast. "For the launch of Stüssy’s Summer 2020 collection, Artist and California local Jim Denevan, drew an iconic Stüssy curly “S” in the golden sand of Northern California. Monumental in scale, precise in execution, but fleeting like a live performance. Here today, gone tomorrow."

Denevan has also previously been commissioned for the following works of art:

- 2022 "Angle of Repose", Desert X AlUla, AlUla.
- 2015 Clarks Boots, "The Desert Boot," Jean Dry Lake, Jean, Nevada
- 2015 Zazen Bear, Studio Matter, "Zen Garden," New York, NY
- 2014 Earth to Echo, Relativity Media, Water Drawing, Lucerne Dry Lake, California
- 2011 Amstel, "The Amstel Surfari," Mundaka, Spain
- 2011 Movistar Summer Experience 2011, Argentina
- 2011 Hyundai, "Make An Impression," Campaign, Australia
- 2010 Anthropologie, Drawing on Lake Baikal, Siberia
- 2008 Absolut Vodka, "In An Absolut World" Campaign, "In an Absolut World Cities Farm" Rockefeller Center, New York City, NY
- 2006 Land Rover/Range Rover, "Designed for the Extraordinary," television, print and billboard campaign, Point Conception, CA.

Denevan's work has been featured at museums across the country. Vancouver Sculpture Biennale in 2010, and the Yerba Buena Center for the Arts in 2005, have held live performances of Jim drawing his art. His art has been displayed in collections like the MoMA PS1, the Laguna Art Museum, the Museum of Arts and Design, the Parrish Art Museum, and the Peabody Essex Museum.
