= Rini leh Rina =

2024 Mizo film

- Film poster
- Directed by: Drew Pachuau
- Written by: Samuel L. Pachuau
- Produced by: In-House Production
- Starring: Francis Malsawmdawngkima; Sangsangi; Esther Zongte
- Cinematography: Drew Pachuau
- Edited by: Drew Pachuau
- Production companies: In-House Production; Lailen Consulting Pvt. Ltd
- Distributed by: Lersia Play
- Release date: 19 January 2024
- Running time: 115 minutes
- Country: India
- Language: Mizo

Rini leh Rina (English: Rini and Rina) is a 2024 Indian Mizo romantic drama film directed by Drew Pachuau and produced by In-House Production. The film stars Francis Malsawmdawngkima and Sangsangi. A Hindi remake titled Yaad is currently under production.

== Premise ==
The film follows two sisters, Rini and Rina, whose close relationship is tested by personal choices, misunderstandings and hardships. As tensions develop between them, they confront their differences and rediscover the familial bond that once held them together.

== Cast ==
- Francis Malsawmdawngkima
- Sangsangi
- Esther Zongte
- Lalzawmsanga
- Alli Sandra Lalrinhluii
- Sanghmingthangi

== Production ==
Filming took place in Thenzawl, Serchhip, Hualngohmun, Aizawl and Sialsuk.

== Release ==
On 19 January 2024, the film was released digitally on Lersia Play.

== Accolades ==
Year	Award	Category	Recipient	Result	Ref.
2024	Mizo Film Awards 2024	Best Actress	Sangsangi	Won	

== Remake ==
In March 2026, Drew Pachuau confirmed that a remake is officially in development. The Hindi-language remake, titled Yaad, is being developed by In-House Production and J&R Production, with Drew Pachuau directing. The adaptation will feature minor changes for Hindi-speaking audiences. Filming is planned across Assam and other parts of Northeast India, while post-production is expected to take place in Mumbai.

The film has an estimated budget of up to ₹1 crore, which would make it the highest-budgeted film produced in Mizoram. The film would also become the first Mizo-produced film to receive a nationwide theatrical release in India, followed by an OTT release.
