= Zirsangzela Hnamte =

Mizo language writer and composer (b. 1950, d. 2002)

- Born: 1 December 1952; Mizoram, India
- Died: 15 October 2002 (aged 49)
- Occupations: Academic; Writer
- Known for: Mizo literature
- Awards: Mizo Zaimi Inzawmkhawm Award

Zirsangzela Hnamte (1 December 1952 - 15 October 2002) was a writer of Mizo literature. He started composing at 17. He composed over 75 songs. Many of his songs are now used as study material in high school and colleges of Mizoram.

== Personal ==
Hnamte was born in Sialsuk in 1952 and was the eldest among 8 siblings. He is said to be introverted.

== Recognition ==
- Best Composer of Mizo Songs 1977: Shillong, Ṭhalfavang Kut
- Best Composer of Mizo Songs 1980: Mizoram Beat and Music contest Organised by IPR &T Govt. of Mizoram .
- Composer of song of the Year, 1989: Mizo Zaimi Inzawmkhawm Award.
- Composer of song of the Year, 1986: Lelte Weekly Magazine, Five Tops of Mizoram Poll.

== Songs ==
Some of the songs that were composed by Zirsangzela are:

- Lo Kir rawh (1969)
- Tawn leh ni tur (1969)
- Dam ni her ve ang maw suihlunglen hi (1969)
- Nunhlui liam hnu (1969)
- Kar hla di (1970)
- Remna lo leng rawh se (1971)
- Din thar leh ang (1973)
- Tni her thuai se (1973)
- Sem zel nang e hmangaihna (1973)
- Tawn har di (1973)
- Run zau (1973)
- Di len mawii (1974)
- Kam khat a tawk (1974)
- Lunglen tuar zir (1974)
- Phurh zawh loh zun (1974)
- Ka ring lo che (1974)
- Hmangaihna rinawm (1974)
- Lawm thu (1974)
- Ainawni (1975)
- Dawn lo (1975)
- Thai Mami (1975)
- Di Hlui (1975)
- Phengphe Nunnem (1976)
- Lenrual An Kim Ta Lo (1976)
- Mary Jones School (197*)
- Pawm Leh Nang Che (1977)
- Autograph (1977)
- Ka To Ber (1977)
- Thal Favang Kut (1977)
- Thuchah Hnuhnung (1977)
- Kawmthlang-Nu Chan (1978)
- Piancham Lawm Hla (1978)
- Bang Ziakin A (1978)
- I Tan Ka Nung Tawh ang (1978)
- Hlim Zan (1978)
- A Pawi Ber Mai (1978)
- Darthlalang (1978)
- I Chul Tur Hi (1979)
- Sulhnu Leh Lunglen (1978)
- Thahmingliani (197*)
- Zeenat Aman (1978)
- Luah Loh Run (1979)
- Thlafam Vangkhua I Kaipui Le (197*)
- A Nem Zel Ngai e (1979)
- Zo Nun Mawi (1979)
- A Hril Ve Tur (1979)
- Run Hmun Len I Rel Ang (1979)
- A Pawi Mange Ka Thian (1980)
- I Mawi Ber Mai (1980)
- Thlafam Min Chansan Le (1980)
- Engvang Nge Ni ? (1980)
- Ka Ngai Ber Che (1980)
- Perkhuang Zai Tin Thiam (1980)
- Lawm Zel Tang E (1980)
- Zoremsiami (1980)
- Hnem Dun Ang Aw (1980)
- Sekibuhchhuak (1981)
- Chun leh Zua Ngaih (1981)
- I harh ang U (1982)
- A Rem Lul Lo (1982)
- Kumtluang Par (1987)
- Pathian I Ni Si A (1995)
- Kan Ngai Em Che
- Ka Hmang Ral Leh Thin
- Tah A Tul Leh Thin
- Biakloh Di Zun
- Hangaihna Tluantling
- Cho Loh Di (1982)
- I Harh Ang U (1999)

== See also ==
- Mizo literature
