= Communal meal =

Meal eaten by a group of people

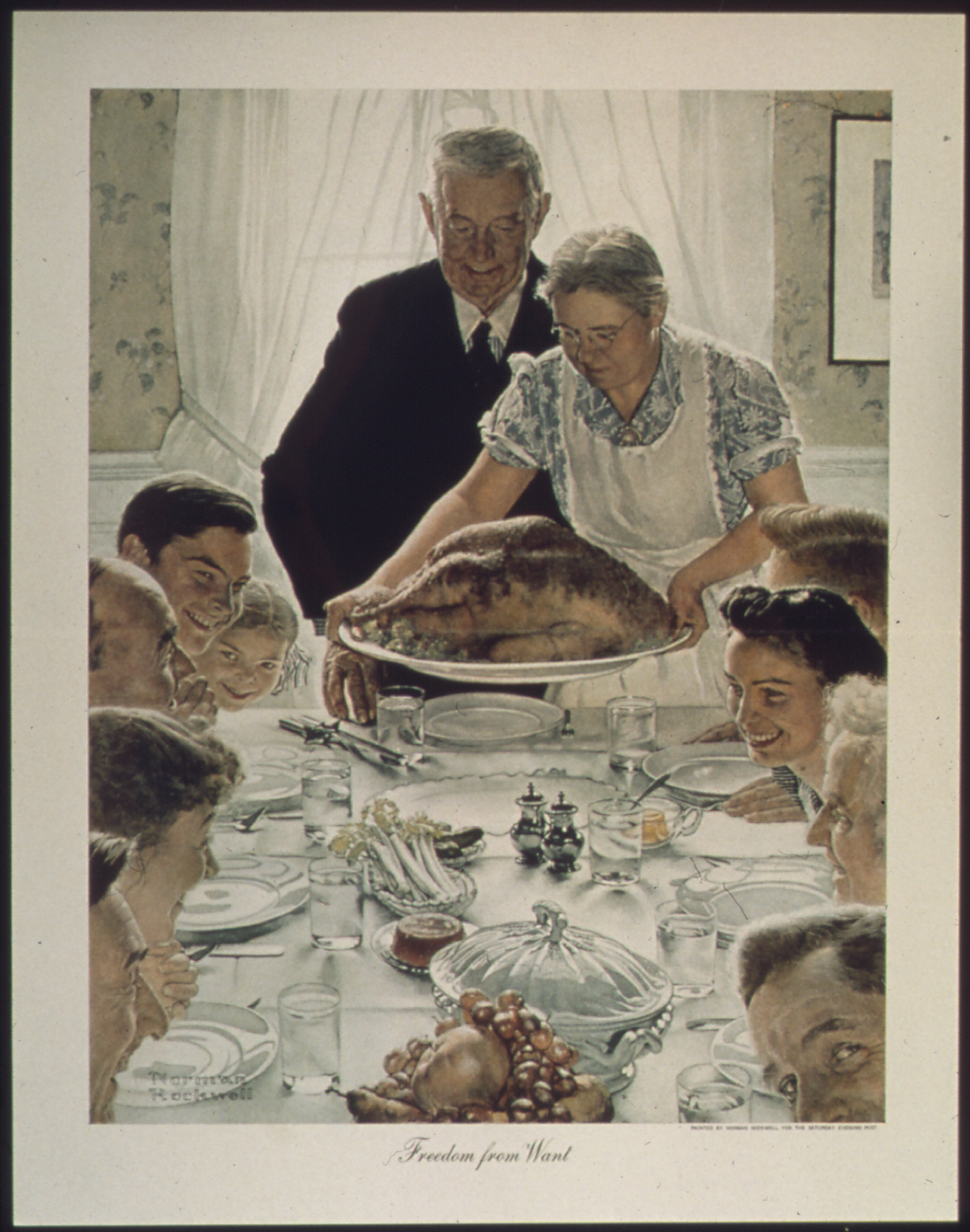
Freedom from Want by Norman Rockwell, an iconic image of an American Thanksgiving meal

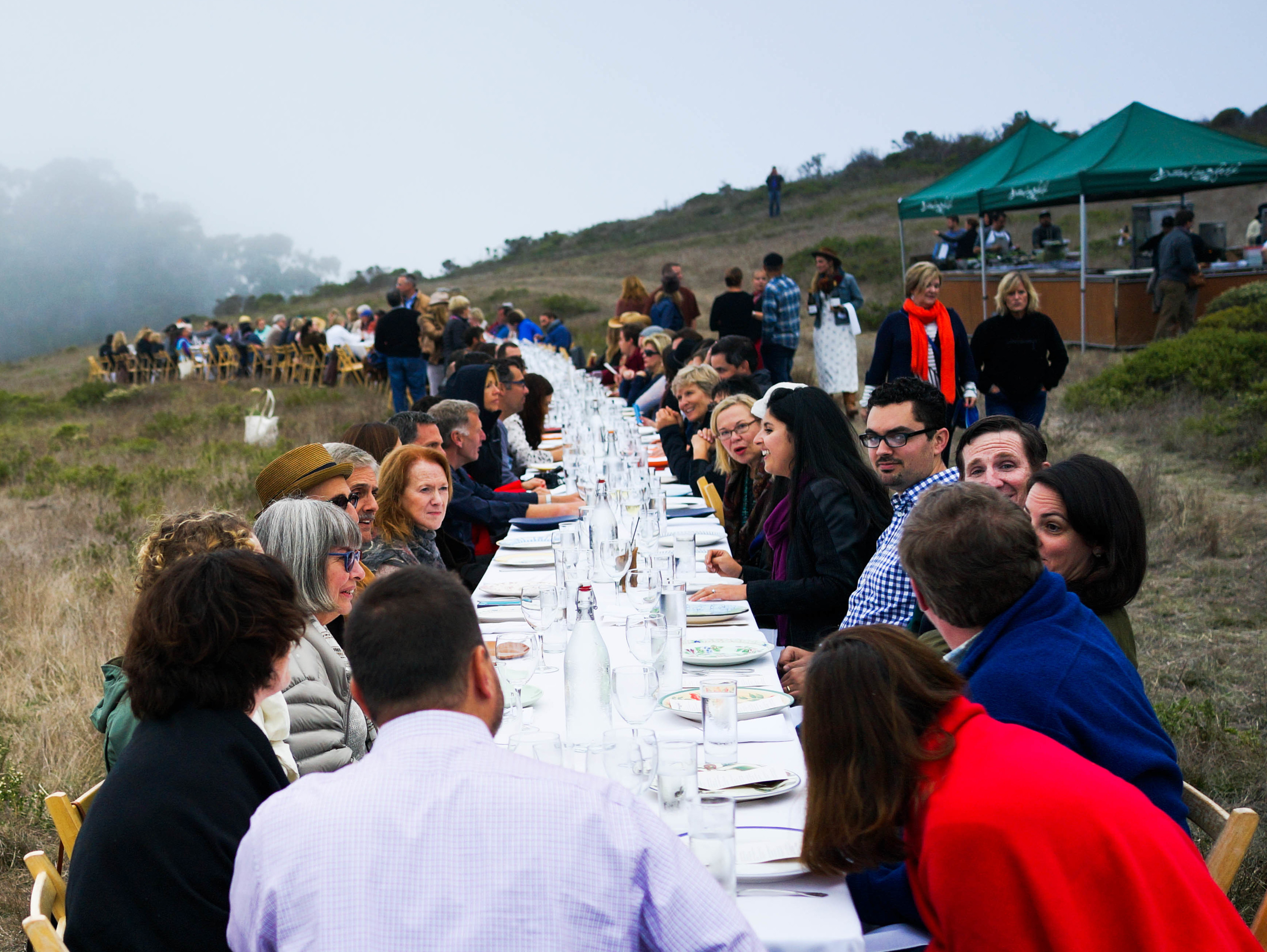
Communal diners at Outstanding in the Field

A communal meal is a meal eaten by a group of people. Also referred to as communal dining, the practice is centered on food and sharing time with the people who come together in order to share the meal and conversation. Communal dining can take place in public establishments like restaurants, college cafeterias, or in private establishments (home). It often but not always serves a social, symbolic and/or ceremonial purpose. For some, the act of eating communally defines humans as compared to other species. Communal meals have long been of interest to both archeologists and anthropologists. Much scholarly work about communal eating has focused on special occasions but everyday practices of eating together with friends, family or colleagues is also a form of communal eating.

Communal eating is closely bound up with commensality (the sociological concept of eating with other people). Communal eating is also bound up with eating and drinking together to cement relations, to establish boundaries and hierarchies as well as for pleasure.

Some examples of communal meals are the Native American potlatch, the Thanksgiving meal, cocktail parties, and company picnics. Meals shared for religious traditions include the Christian Agape feast, Muslim iftar, and Jewish Passover Seder.

Some restaurants feature communal meals at large tables where diners are seated next to strangers and are encouraged to interact with neighbors.

Communal dining was an important part of ancient Rome's religious traditions. There is a mention of communal dining in Chinese history.

== See also ==
- Refectory
