= Outstanding in the Field =

Recurring outdoor dining event

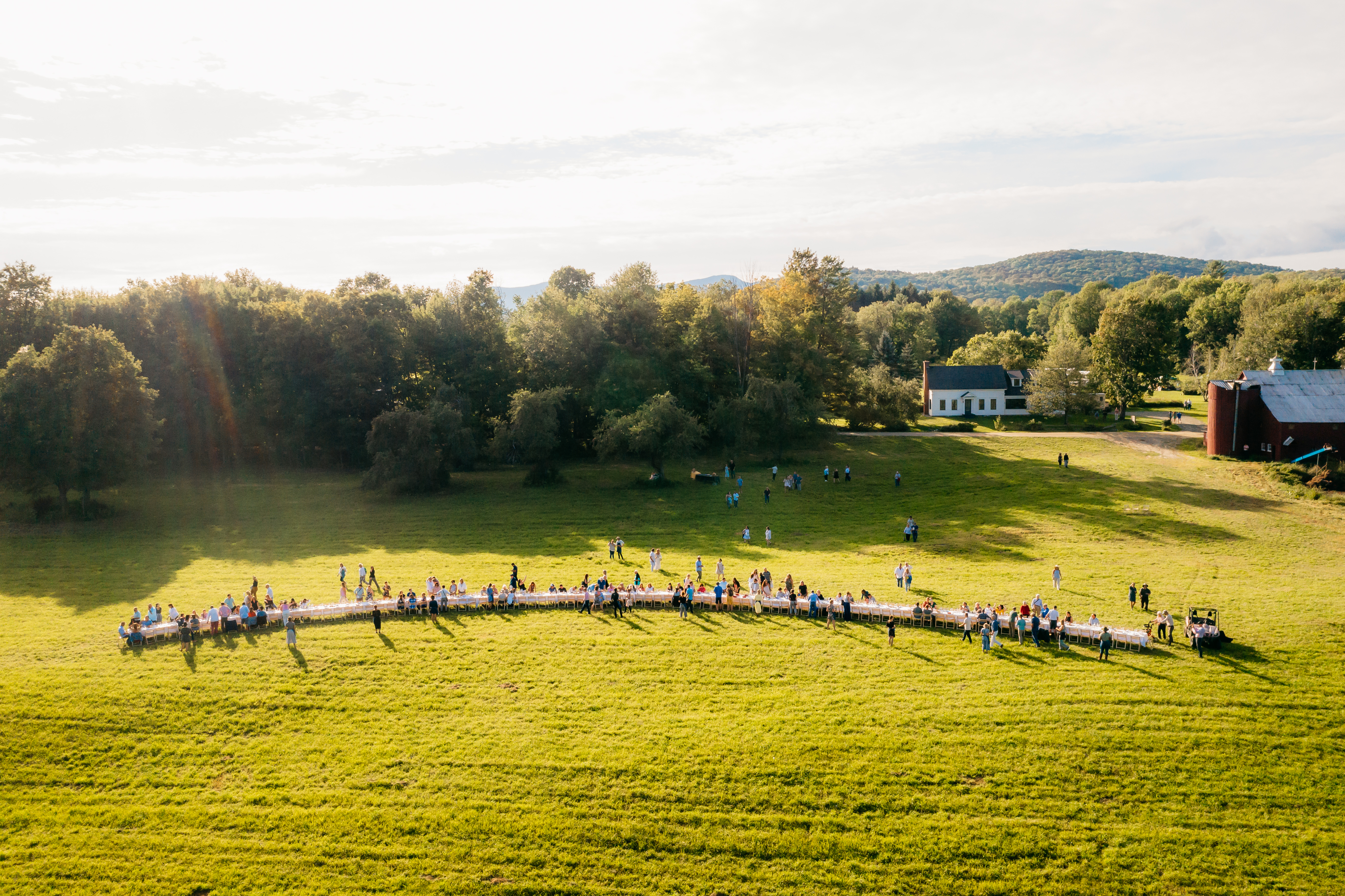
- Inaugurated: 1999
- Founder: Jim Denevan
- Major events: Outdoor dining
- Website: outstandinginthefield.com

Outstanding in the Field is a recurring outdoor dining event. Founded in 1999 by Jim Denevan in the United States, it has been held in 17 countries. Local chefs create a four- or five-course menu for each event no more than a few weeks before it is held, designing the menu based on local ingredients and the event venue, and attendees do not learn what they will be served until after they arrive. Diners sit at a communal table at which meals are served family style, with one platter for every eight people. Each event lasts approximately five hours and hosts between 130 and 200 people on average.

== History ==
Outstanding in the Field was founded in 1999 by Jim Denevan. The first outdoor dining event took place on a small farm. Denevan held three dinners in 1999, two in 2000, seven in 2002, and eight in 2003, which was the year he left his position as head chef at Gabriella Café. In 2004, he hired a staff and began touring the country full-time to hold Outstanding in the Field events.

As of October 2021, the event had been held in all 50 states of the United States, as well as 16 other countries.

== Format ==
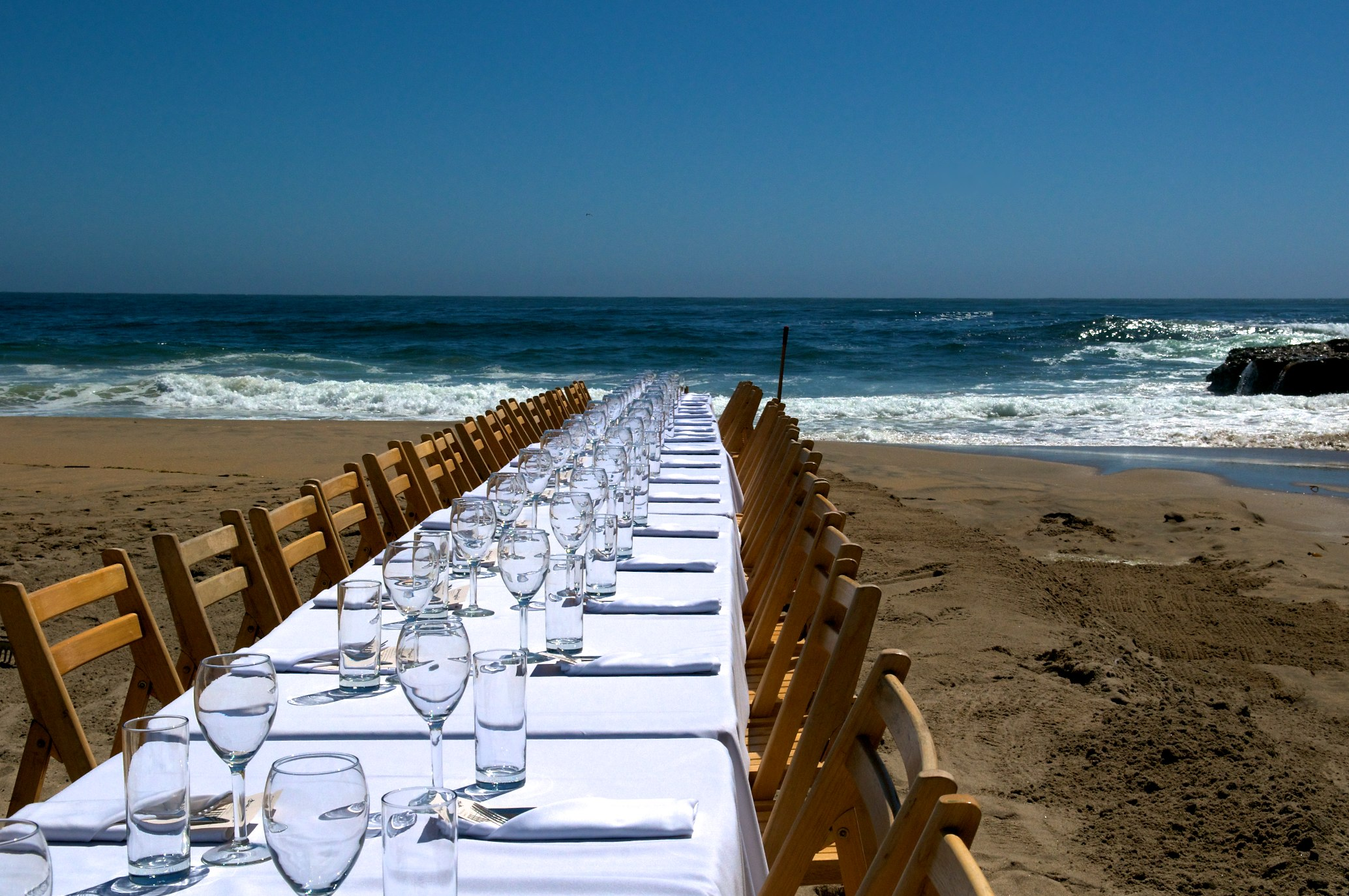
The table setting at an Outstanding in the Field event

Outstanding in the Field events are dinners at which chefs from the area in which a given event is being held cook for hundreds of attendees. Tickets must be purchased for admission. Between 130 and 200 people attend an average event, which lasts approximately five hours.

=== Venue ===
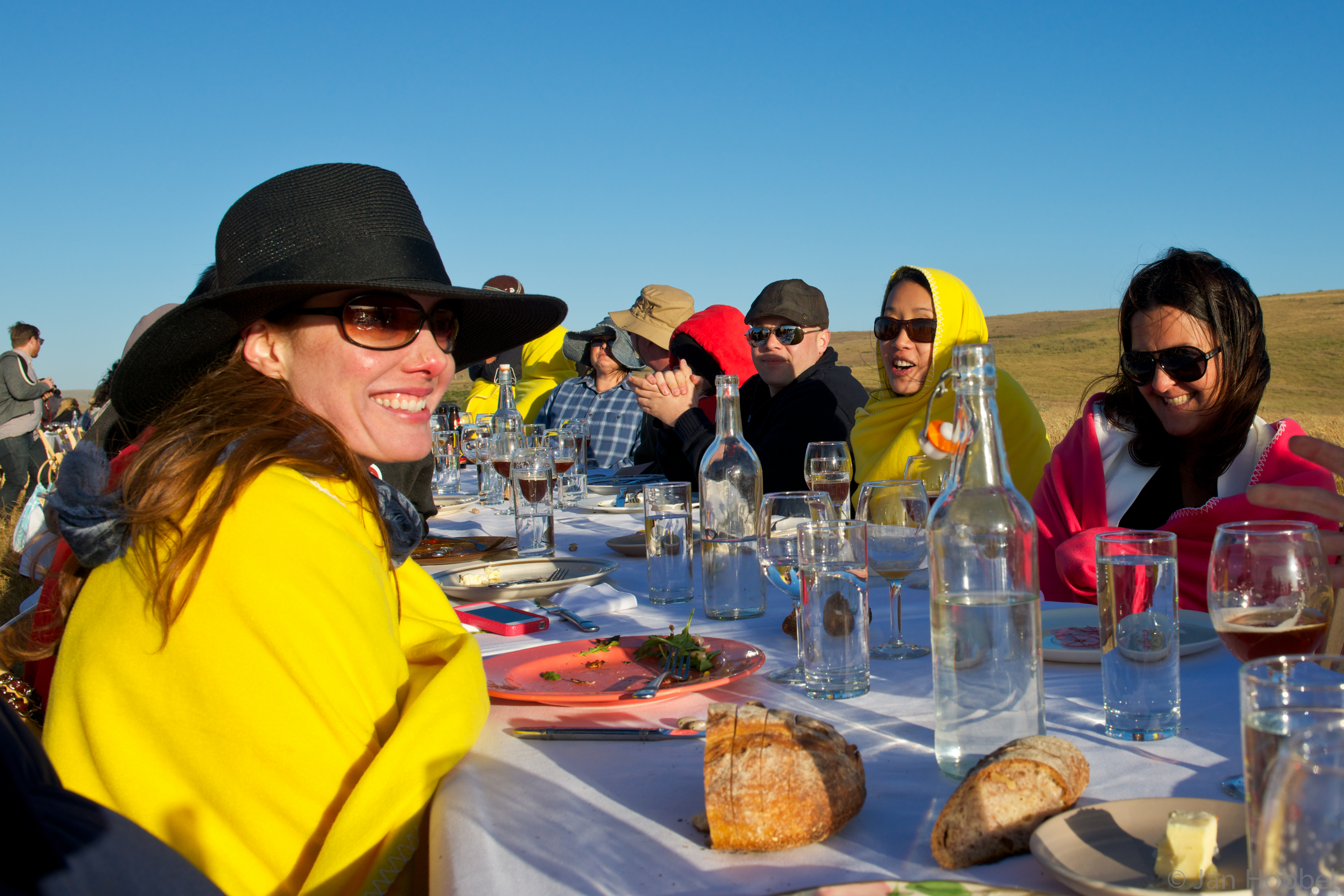
An Outstanding in the Field event in progress

Founder Jim Denevan and his staff arrive at the dinner location, usually a farm, on the day of the event to set up. In the United States, they travel from one event to the next in a red-and-white Flxible bus belonging to Denevan. Tables are arranged end-to-end to resemble a single long table, curved to match the features of the local landscape. Denevan sometimes also creates a site-specific piece of ephemeral art near the tables.

In addition to farms, Outstanding in the Field events have been held in places including Jackson Hole, Chicago, and Coachella Valley Music and Arts Festival.

=== Experience ===
Outstanding in the Field events begin with a cocktail hour and a guided tour of the location before the meal.

=== Food ===
Each meal has a four- or five-course menu that is designed by the local chefs and never repeated; attendees find out what they will be eating after arriving at the event. Chefs are asked not to write the menu for the event until a few weeks before it occurs, and base the meal on the event venue and the ingredients that can be sourced locally. The meals are served family style, with one platter of food for every eight people.

== Notable instances ==
At Coachella Valley Music and Arts Festival in 2016, an Outstanding in the Field event was held each night, with three famous chefs partnering with one local farmer for each meal. Outstanding in the Field had additionally been held at Coachella festivals from two previous years. A five-course meal on one of the nights included fresh flatbread, head cheese with herb salad, steamed Arctic char, kalbi with kimchi polenta, and a dessert of grilled stonefruit on shortcake topped with whipped cream. On a different night of the same festival, the meal included spicy scallop ceviche, a merkava salad, fish and carnitas tacos, and whole pig carnitas, with a dessert of arroz con leche and honey-flavored ice cream.

In 2018, an Outstanding in the Field event was held at Flying Disc Ranch to celebrate the 40th anniversary of the ranch. The four-course menu centered around dates, the main product of the ranch, and included a roasted beet salad, Kung Pao shrimp with dates, lamb shank with a date-based barbecue sauce, and finally a tres leches cupcake.

In 2016, 2017, 2018, and 2019, Outstanding in the Field events were held at Kualoa Ranch.
