= Outdoor dining =

Culinary concept

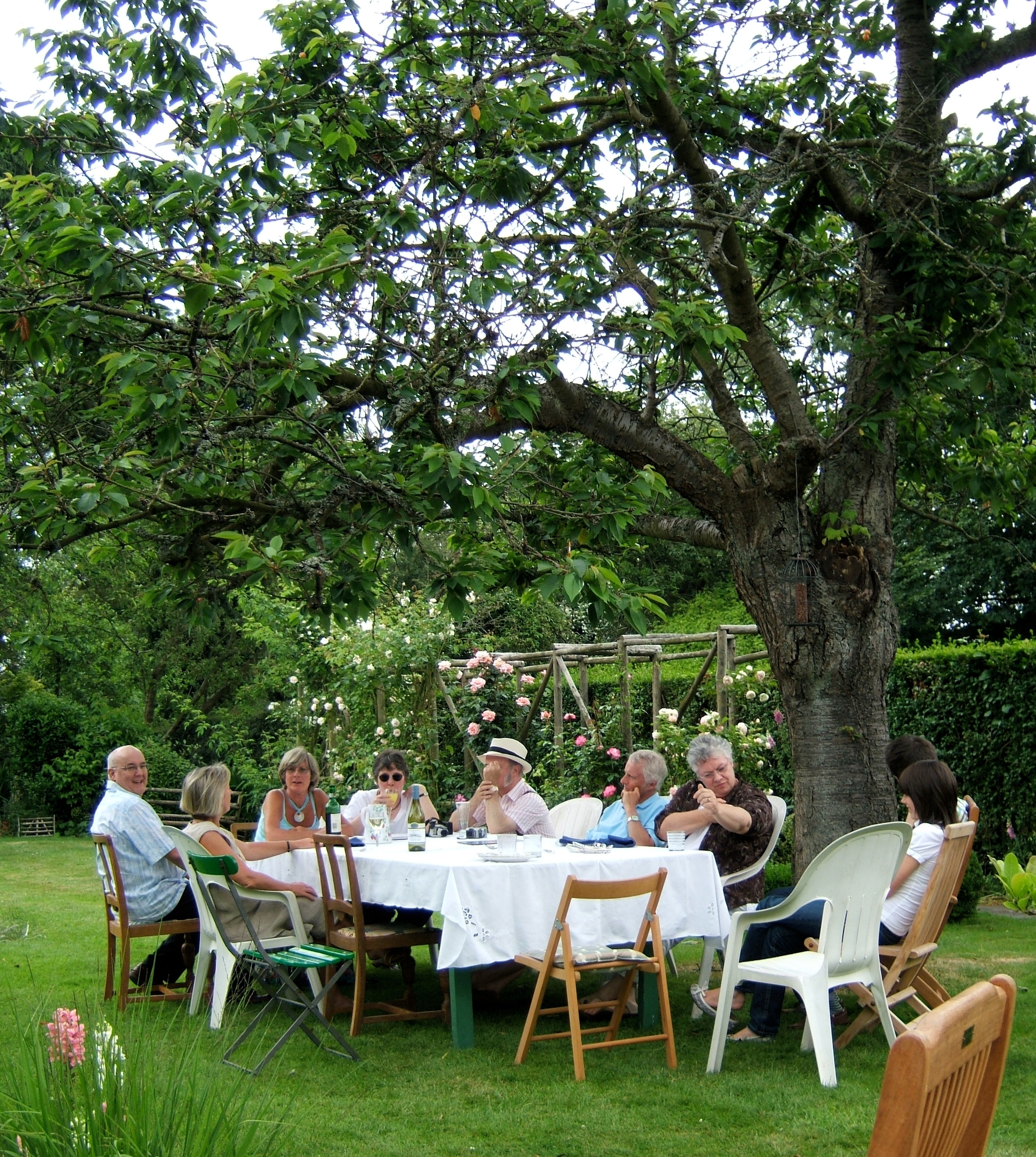
A group of people dining outside

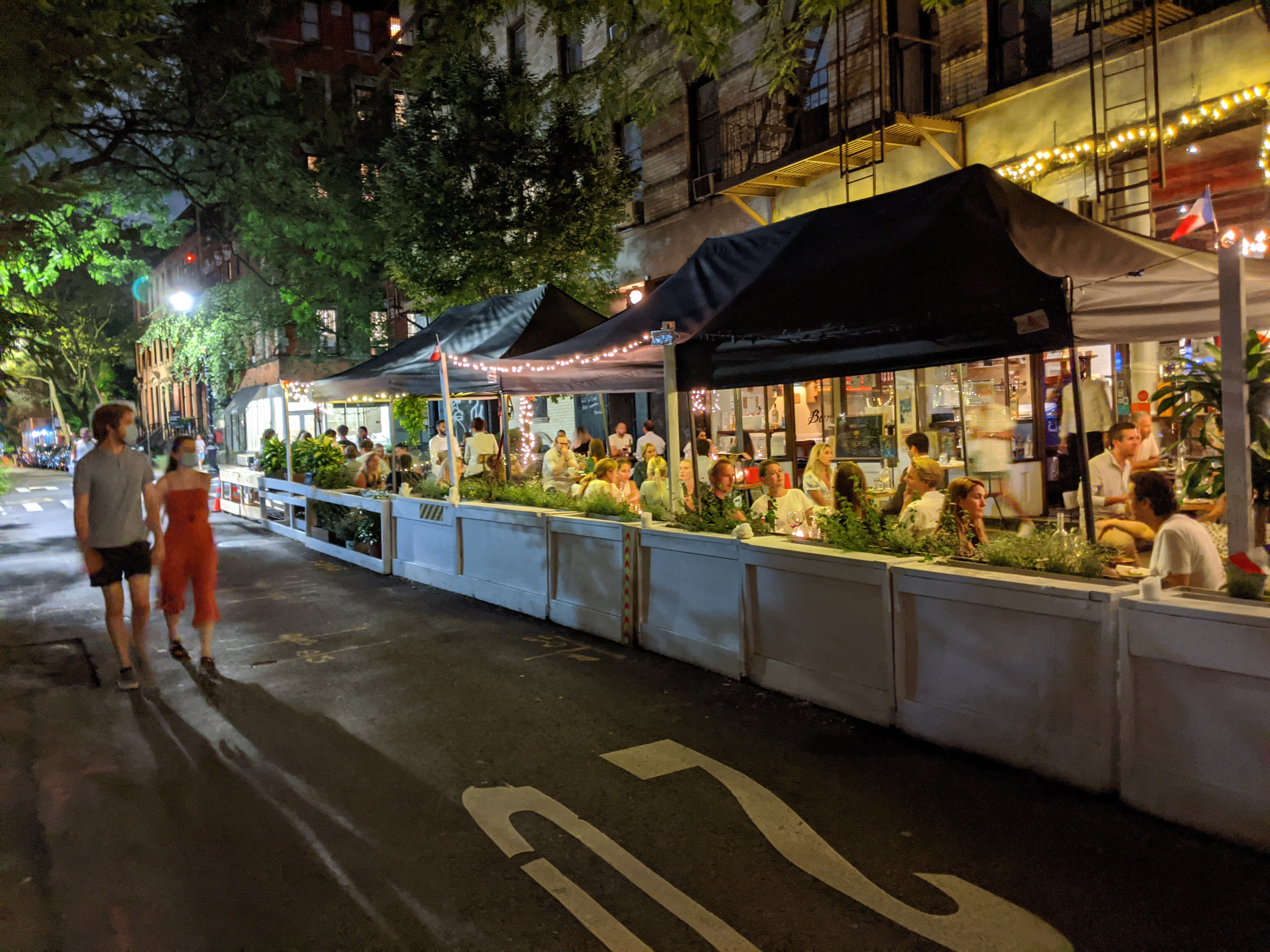
Restaurant in New York City during COVID-19 emergency rules

Outdoor dining, also known as al fresco dining or dining al fresco, is the act of eating a meal outside.

In temperate climates, al fresco dining is especially popular in the summer months when temperatures and weather are most favorable. It is a style of dining that is casual and often party-like in its atmosphere.

In order to promote and accommodate the pedestrian activity and vibrancy associated with al fresco dining, some communities have passed ordinances permitting it at restaurants, including the service of food and alcoholic beverages to customers at pavement tables, until late at night.

== Etymology ==
The phrase al fresco composed of two words, is borrowed from Italian for "in the cool/fresh [air]". It is not in current use in Italian to refer to dining outside. Instead, Italians use the phrases fuori ("outside", "outdoor") or all'aperto ("in the open [air]"). In Italian, the expression al fresco usually refers to spending time in jail.

== COVID-19 pandemic ==
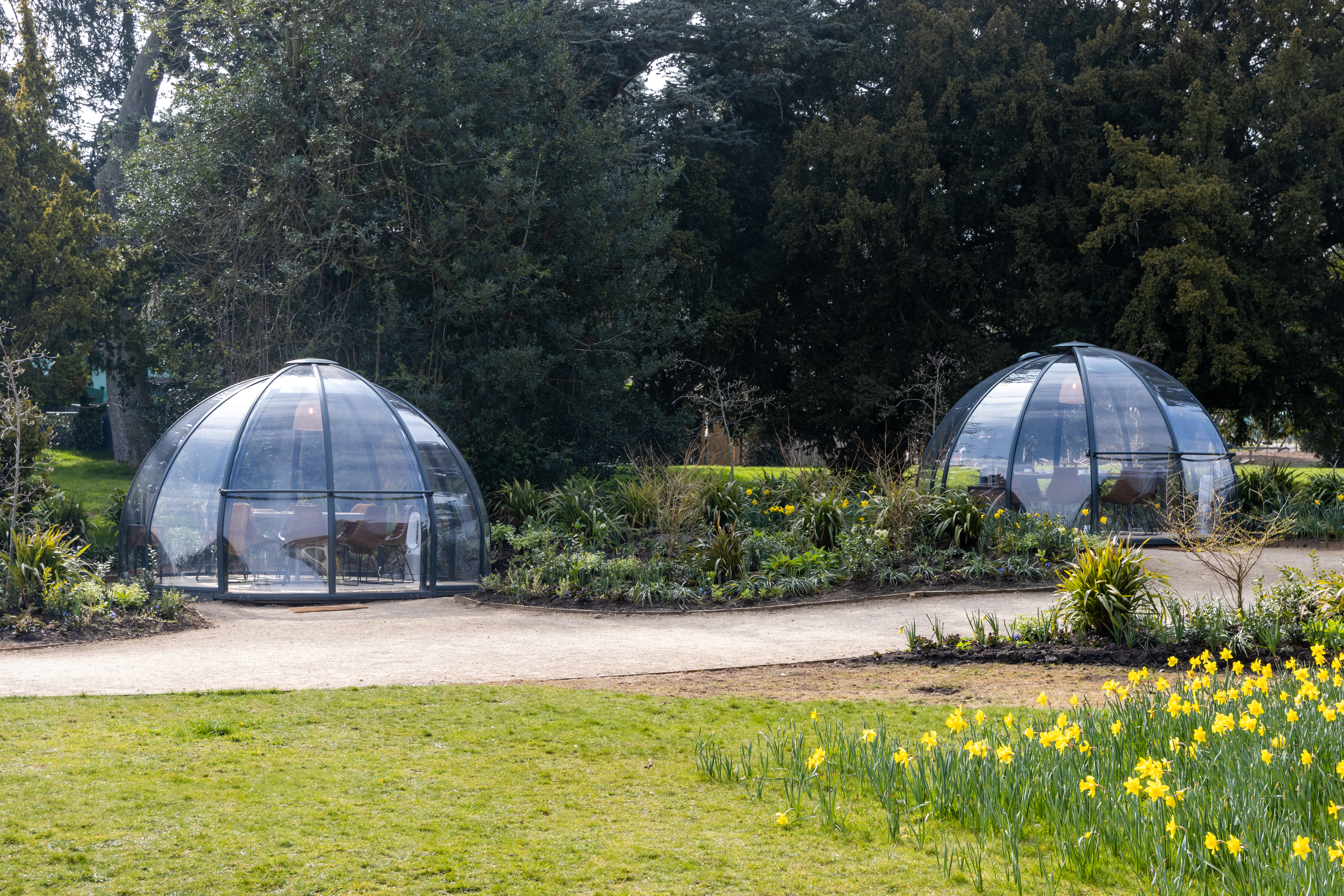
Outdoor dining pods at Trentham Gardens

In 2020, responding to the COVID-19 pandemic, many cities increased the options for restaurants to offer outdoor dining, in order to promote open-air and spaced-out seating, and help businesses economically recover from the pandemic's impact.

In New York City, 10,600 restaurants had enrolled in the city's outdoor dining program by September 2020, compared to just 1,023 sidewalk cafes that existed before the pandemic. The use of bubble tents or outdoor dining pods also increased during the pandemic. Before the pandemic, these pod installations were rare. Although outdoor pods reduce the risk of contracting COVID-19 compared to indoor dining, they have been criticized for their lack of air ventilation.

Some cities, such as New York and Portland, have taken steps to preserve outdoor dining installations that were originally introduced as a COVID-19 mitigation, albeit with new regulations and fee structures. In other cities, such as Paris, Long Beach and Claremont, rollbacks to initially liberal pandemic-era dining policies have resulted in a significant decrease in the availability of outdoor dining.

== See also ==
- Sidewalk cafe
- Outstanding in the Field
