= Lalthangfala Sailo =

Indian educationist

- Born: 1933 (age 92–93); Mizoram, British India
- Occupations: Writer; Educationist
- Known for: Writings, Social work, Education
- Spouse: Lalhrimi Sailo
- Children: Ngurzidinga Sailo, Ngursangliana Sailo, Ngurhlunchhunga Sailo, Ngurzikpuii Sailo
- Parent: Dohleia Sailo (L),
- Awards: Padma Shri, Sangeet Natak Akademi Award on playwright, Bharat Adivasi Award, Pu Buanga Award

Lalthangfala Sailo is an Indian educationist, short story writer, playwright and a former president of the Mizo Academy of Letters. He is a former deputy registrar at the Mizoram campus of the North Eastern Hill University.

== Publications ==
He has written several articles in Mizo language and has published several books including:

- AIDS dona thawnthu tawi, ral hlauhawm chu (Short stories),
- Zo kalsiam,
- Liandova te unau leh Sangi ingleng (plays),
- Ainawn, the preface of which has been written by Laltluangliana Khiangte.

== Awards and honors ==
The Government of India awarded him the fourth highest civilian honour of the Padma Shri, in 2009, for his contributions to Education.

== See also ==
- North Eastern Hill University
- Mizo literature
- Laltluangliana Khiangte
