= James Dokhuma =

Mizo author and insurgent

Dr James Dokhuma
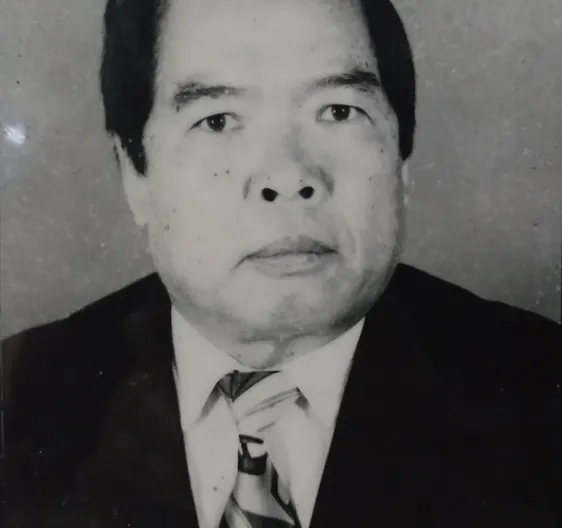
- Dr. James Dokhuma Padma Shri portrait
- Born: 15 June 1932; Sialsuk
- Died: 10 March 2007 (aged 74)
- Criminal charges: IPC Section 121 (Waging, or attempting to wage war, or abetting waging of war, against the Government of India, state & etc.)
- Criminal penalty: Life imprisonment( he later got pardoned because of the Mizoram Peace Accord)
- Spouse: Chhuanthangpuii(married 1960–death)
- Children: 6
- Parents: Hrangchina Chhakchhuak (father); Kâpkûngi (mother)
- Relatives: Dokhama(brother), Darawti(sister), Romani(sister), Lalṭanpuia(brother)
- Awards: Academy Award(Mizo academy of Letters)
- Honours: Padma Shri; Bhasha Samman

James Dokhuma (15 June 1932 to 10 March 2007) was a Mizo poet, writer and insurgent who was awarded Padmashri for his literary contributions.

== Early life and education ==
Dokhuma was born on 15 June 1932 in Sialsuk village. At the age of 15, he joined the Indian Army and served from 1947-1952.

== Career ==
After serving in the army, he become a teacher in the Hualtu Middle School. With the contribution of his book Ṭawng Un Hrilhfiahna, in 1971 the government of Mizoram bestowed the title "Father of Mizo Lexicography"

== Imprisonment ==
Dokhuma was a participant in the Mizo National Front and was jailed. Books such as Rinawmin contribute to a unique genre in Mizo literature known as Rambuai, which details the events of the Mizo Insurgency of 1966-1986. After the MNF uprising of 1966, Dokhuma joined the movement as the MNF block president of Tlungvel Circle. Other notable roles include Deputy Speaker and member of Parliament to the MNF underground movement. Dokhuma was captured and sent to Nowgong Special Jail before being transferred to Guwahati Central Jail and released in 1971. Due to his activities as an insurgent, Dokhuma's right arm was impaired. In a confrontation with the Indian army, his arm was hit by a bullet while two hit his torso and one hit his leg. In the post-accord Mizoram, Dokhuma settled as a preacher working for the Salvation Army Evangelical mission.

== Achievements ==
For his contributions he received Bhasha Samman, Padma shri and the Mizo Academy Awards. Dokhuma secured the Mizo Academy Award for Best Writer of the Year five times in 1984, 1986, 1988, 1991 and 1996.

== Works ==
=== Poetry ===
- Mi zâwn inchuh (Textbook for Class- XI MBSE Mizo)
- Pûm (Textbook for Class-XII MBSE Mizo)
- A tak chu khawiah nge? (B.A)
- Siamtu Khuarêl (M.A)
- Thu rêng ka nei si lo (M.A)
- Pi Pu sûlhnu (M.A)

=== Prose ===
- Ka thuhretu (Textbook for Class-VII)
- Lungawina (Textbook for Class-IX)
- Zân (Textbook for Class-X)
- Serh leh sâng (Textbook fork for Class-XI (Core))
- Fam ta lo chu (Textbook for Class-XI (Elective))
- Sawifiahna Ṭawngauchheh (B.A)

=== Novels ===
- Irrawaddy Lui Kamah (Textbook for Class-IX)
- Tumpang Chal nge Saithangpuii (B.A)
- Thla Hleinga Zan (B.A)
- Khawhar In (M.A)

=== Books ===
- Rinawmin (1970)
- Khawhar In (1970)
- Thla Hleinga Zan (1970)
- Zoram Kohhran Tualṭo Chanchin (1975)
- Tumna Chu a Hlawhtling ṭhin (1976)
- Kawtlang Inzirna (1976)
- Ni leh Thla kara leng (1978)
- Hmasawnna (1978)
- Arsi Thawnthu (1979)
- Hausak aiin hrisel a hlu zawk (1979)
- Finna Hmahruai (1980)
- Ṭawng Un Hrilhfiahna (1981)
- Tumpangchal nge Saithangpuii? (1981)
- Chawngkhum dân tlang huat loh (1981)
- Ka Inpuanna (1982)
- Chawngkhum dan tlang huat loh Bu-2-na (1982)
- Hmangaihna Thuchah (1982)
- Irrawaddy Lui Kamah (1982)
- Good Bye, Lushai Brigade (1983)
- Notes on Mizo Idioms & Phrases (1983)
- Kimoto Syonora (1984)
- Nunna bua hming chuangte (1986)
- Gabbatha (1989)
- Chhungkua(Sipai Inkhawm Thupui) (1990)
- Lonesome Cowbow (1990)
- Hmeichhia leh mipa indona (1992)
- Hmanlai Mizo Kalphung (1992)
- Netaji Subhash Chandra Bose (1993)
- Mak leh Mak (1995)
- An va hlu êm
- Enthlatute (Sex Spy & War Spy)
- Silaimu Ngaihawm
- Ka Thinlung Luang Liam
- Rilru Far Chhuak
- Zokhaw Nun
- Thla Hleinga Zan II
- Ch. Chhunga Chanchin
- Thisen leh Mei (Self Denial Thupui)
- Lamsuaka
- Singapore-a Mizo Saltangte
- Kham Kâr Senhri (True Story)
- Mizo Ṭawng Kalphung

== Death ==
In February 2007 he had a sudden violent fit of shivers. According to tests results, his blood sugar completely destroyed his kidneys, eyes, lungs and heart. He also developed a urinary tract infection. He died on 27 March 2007.

== Facts ==
- He received a Doctorate Degree from the International University of California.
- One of his works, Gabbatha, is believed to be the first Mizo fiction to be translated in English
- Many of his works are used by schools
- He was pronounced dead at birth, but found breathing at the last second, when he was being lowered down
- His writing career started when he was imprisoned at Nowgong Special Jail
