= Sialsuk =

Village in Mizoram, India

- Village
- Location within Mizoram Location within India
- Coordinates: 23°23′52″N 92°45′00″E
- Country: India
- State: Mizoram
- District: Aizawl district
- Time zone: UTC+5:30 (IST)
- PIN: 796190

Sialsuk is a village in the Aizawl district, Mizoram, India.

== History ==
On 1 April 2024, houses were destroyed in a storm along with neighboring villages.

== Transport ==
The village is served by the World Bank road which stretches to Aizawl.

== Notable people ==
- Zirsangzela Hnamte, writer of Mizo literature songs
