= Lalthlamuong Keivom =

Indian diplomat (1939–2021)

- Born: 15 July 1939; Manipur, British Raj
- Died: 28 November 2021 (aged 82)
- Occupations: Academic; Writer
- Known for: Mizo literature & Hmar Literature
- Spouse: Dari Keivom
- Children: 4 children
- Parent(s): Hrangthatfieng Keivom and Khawtinhnieng
- Awards: Book of the Year Award, Mizo Academy of Letters
- Website: zoramkhawvel.com

Lalthlamuong Keivom (15 July 1939 – 28 November 2021) was an Indian diplomat, writer and composer of Mizo literature and Hmar literature. Keivom was nicknamed Zoram Khawvel Pa after his treatise Zoram Khawvel and for his contribution towards the integration of Zo people.

== Early life ==
Lalthlamuong Keivom was born on July 15, 1939, in Pherzawl, located in Pherzawl district of Manipur. He completed his Master of Arts degree in History from Gauhati University. He grew up in a large family of thirteen siblings, with his father named Hrangthatfieng Keivom and his mother named Khawtinhnieng.

== Career ==
Lalthlamuong Keivom started his career as a teacher in Manipur in 1963, he later joined Sielmat Christian College, Lamka (1966–67) after which he was with the Indian Revenue Service from 1967 to 1970. In 1970 he joined the Indian Foreign Service. During his service period as an IFS Officer he was posted in different countries: Nairobi, Kenya (1976–80); Jeddah, Saudi Arabia (1980–83); Wellington, New Zealand (1983–85); Rangoon, Burma (1986–90); Milan, Italy (1990–93); Male, Maldives (1994–97). Towards the end of his diplomatic career he was posted to Delhi (1997–2002) and retired in 2002 and engaged in literature till his death.

== Publications ==
L. Keivom has written and published more than 20 books in Hmar:

- Thralai Hlabu (1963);
- Hmar Hla Suina (1980);
- Zangkhaw Bungbu (2000);
- Nun Ram, Ka Nun (2001);
- Baibul (Hmar)-Holy Bible, Delhi Version (2007)
- Rabindranath Tagore's Nobel Prize winning work
- The Gitanjali (translated in 1974 and now in the press).
- Keivom Diary (Collection of Articles)

In Mizo:

- Zoram Khawvel 1–8, Bawktlang Thawnthu
- Thuthlung Ram
- Pherzawl Titi
- L.KeivomThukhawchang 1–2

== See also ==
- Mizo literature
