= Lalzuia Colney =

Indian academic and writer

- Born: Mizoram, India
- Occupations: Academic; Writer
- Known for: Mizo literature
- Awards: Padma Shri; Book of the Year Award

Lalzuia Colney is an Indian academic and writer of Mizo literature.

== Career ==
An alumnus of the Government Champhai College, he is a teacher at KVM High School, Mizoram. He has written several books and has contributed chapters to books published by others. Some of his books are prescribed texts for academic studies in Mizoram as well as for the Indian Certificate of Secondary Education (ICSE) examinations.

== Awards ==
- His book, A phêk ropui chungah, won the Book of the Year Award in 2014.
- In 2010, the Government of India awarded him the Padma Shri, India's fourth highest civilian award, for his contributions to literature.

== Publications ==
Some of the Publications by Lalzuia are as follows:

- Mizo tawng ziak dan
- Mizo Thu leh Hla
- Lal hlau lo thi
- Dictionary of Mizo language
- Mizo literacy
- Westminster Abbey
- Zonunkima (Drama)
- Without bringing piece of pipe
- To Holy Land (Israel)

== See also ==
- Mizo literature
