= Thangkhangin Ngaihte =

Indian politician

Personal details
- Died: 27 July 2024
- Party: Lok Janshakti Party
- Education: Jawaharlal Nehru University, Delhi

Thangkhangin Ngaihte was an Indian politician. He was the president of the Lok Janshakti Party (LJP) Manipur State Committee. He was nominated (11 May 2005) by LJP president Ram Vilas Paswan to replace Albert Gengoukhup Mate, the former State Committee president, who was killed in the prior month.

== Biography ==
Born into the family of Sonna of the Ngaihte clan of the Paite-Zomi group, Thangkhangin is the first Manipur-born Zomi scholar, having received his Master's degree in Philosophy at the Jawaharlal Nehru University, Delhi. He is considered to be a trail-blazer for the Zomi Nationalist Movement across the globe. Reportedly, he co-founded the Zomi National Congress (a forerunner for the various branches of the Zo Movement, like ZRO, and ZORO), and is said to have been instrumental in organising the First World Zomi Convention (19–21 May 1988) at Champhai in Mizoram, India.

He died on 27 July 2024 in Delhi, India.
