= J. F. Laldailova =

Writer of Mizo literature, India

- Born: 1925; Tlangnuam, Aizawl Mizoram, India
- Died: 1979 (aged 53–54); Tlangnuam, Aizawl
- Occupations: Academic; Writer
- Known for: Mizo literature
- Spouse: Margaret Thangzawni(m 1952-1970)
- Children: Jacob Thangchuanga; Henry Hunthara; Bernadet Lalthangpuii; Lalthangzaui; John Francis Thangrimawia; Peter Lalthangkima; C Zohmangaiha
- Parent: Peter Thangphunga Agnes Saichhungi

J. F. Laldailova or Joseph Francis Laldailova (1925-1979) was a writer of Mizo literature. He joined Saint Placid's High School in Chittagong in 1935. He later joined the Indian Air Force as a bandmaster. Revered as Mizo William Shakespeare, JF Laldailova was known for his extensive knowledge of Mizo literature and for his exceptional command of English and the Mizo language. He is best remembered for his English to Mizo dictionary, and also for his translation works, literary criticism and being the editor of a literary magazine.

== Digital Adaptation ==
In 2014, a mobile application titled JF Dictionary was launched, offering a digital version of J. F. Laldailova's English-Lushai Dictionary. Developed by Lalsangpuia Ralte, the app provides users with a lightweight, offline-accessible resource for English-Mizo translations. Features include fast search capabilities, audio pronunciation for English entries, and a user-friendly interface. The application is available on the Google Play Store.

== See also ==
- Mizo literature
