= The Anthropologist =

English-language academic journal

- Discipline: Anthropology
- Language: English

Publication details
- History: 1954–present

Standard abbreviations
- ISO 4: Anthropologist

Links
- Journal homepage

The Anthropologist is an English-language peer-reviewed academic journal that concentrates on the anthropology of India. It was first published in August 1954 by the Anthropology department of the University of Delhi, ceased publication in the early 1980s and was then revived in 1999 by Kamla-Raj Enterprises. It is the third journal to focus on the subject, being established after Man in India (1921) and The Eastern Anthropologist (1947).
