= Lalsangzuali Sailo =

Mizo writer, singer and music composer

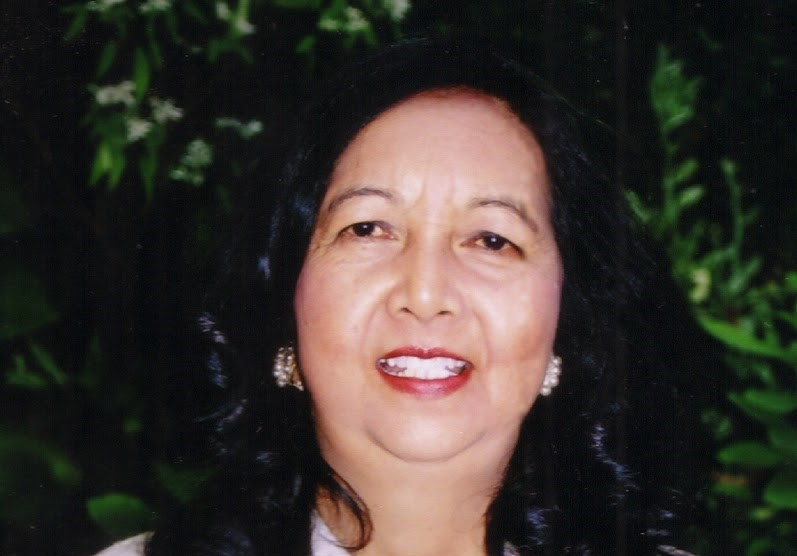
- Lalsangzuali Sailo Padma Shri portrait
- Born: 15 May 1949; Thingsai, Mizoram, India
- Died: 14 October 2006 (aged 57); Aizawl, Mizoram, India
- Occupations: Writer; Gospel singer; Music composer and teacher
- Known for: Gospel songs and social work.
- Spouse: Laldinliana
- Awards: Padma Shri; Mizo Book of the Year Award

Lalsangzuali Sailo (15 May 1949 – 14 October 2006) was a writer, gospel singer and music composer from Mizoram. She has written over 300 songs, in Mizo, Kokborok and English.

== Early life and education ==
Born on 15 May 1949 to S. Vanchhuma and Sapthangi Chawngthu, she grew up in Thingsai, a village in Hnahthial district, Mizoram. She completed her schooling at St. John Bosco's Convent in Cherrapunji and obtained her bachelor's and master's degrees from St. Mary's College, Shillong. She also graduated in education (BEd) and secured a doctoral degrees of (PhD) and DLitt on Mizo literature.

== Career ==
Lalsangzuali Sailo was the headmistress of Govt. J.L. High school. Sailo is the author of over 20 books and three booklets and her book on Mizo history, Tlawm ve lo Lalnu Ropuiliani, won her the Mizo Book of the Year Award from the Mizo Academy of Letters in 1999.She has the distinction of having the most number of audio-cassette among the Mizos, and make her first audio-cassette in 1976. During her lifetime she recorded over 400 songs in AIR, more than any other artist. Her record is still not broken. She composed about 400 songs. She was Grade A artist in AIR. Many of the songs she composed are studied by Mizo students from Class V to M.A.

Lalsangzuali Sailo was also a prominent social worker. She was a lifelong leader in Central MHIP and in the Women Central Committee of the Mizoram Presbyterian Church.

== Personal life ==
After battling cancer, Sailo died on 14 October 2006. Sailo was married to Laldinliana and the couple has two sons and a daughter.

== Awards ==
She received the All India Radio Outstanding Artiste Award in 1998. The Zolentu Newspaper awarded her the Greatest Singer of The Century Award in the year 2000. The Mizo Academy of Letters joint headquarter of Lunglei awarded her the prestigious Pu Buanga Award in 2000. The Government of India awarded her the fourth highest civilian award of the Padma Shri, in 1998.

== See also ==
- Mizo literature
