= Mizo literature =

Culture of Mizo literature and authorship

Mizo literature is the literature written in Mizo ṭawng, the principal language of the Mizo peoples, which has both written and oral traditions. It has undergone a considerable change in the 20th century. The language developed mainly from the Lushai language, with significant influence from Pawi language, Paite language and Hmar language, especially at the literary level.

== Pre-Christianisation period ==
This period of Mizo (written) literature usually refers to the period between 1860 and 1894. Although the Mizo alphabet proper was created around May 1894, written Mizo literature can be said to start from the publication of Progressive Colloquial Exercises in the Lushai Dialect by Thangliana (which is the Mizo name of Thomas Herbert Lewin) in 1874. In this book he wrote down two Mizo folktales Chemtatrawta and Lalruanga leh Kungawrhi with their English translations, and included some Mizo words with their English meaning.

== Early period ==
This is the period between 1894 and 1920, when most of the literary work was produced by the missionaries. Mizo alphabet was created in 1894, and schools were established soon after the creation of Mizo alphabet. On 22 October 1896 the first Mizo language book was published under the title Mizo Zir Tir Bu (lit. Mizo primer). This was a book on Christian religion and morality based on Christianity.

The two Christian missionaries J.H. Lorrain (Pu Buanga) and F.W. Savidge (Sap Upa) started translating the book of gospel according to Luke on 21 August 1895. They went on to translate the gospel according to John, and the two books were printed and published in 1898. Other books were also translated soon after. Some of the most well-known books published during this period were:

1. Isua chanchin (1905)
2. Isua hnenah lo kal rawh (1905–6)
3. Thu inchhang (1908)
4. The Lushai Grammar and Dictionary (1898, by J.H. Lorrain)
5. Dictionary of Lushai (J.H. Lorrain)

A number of devotional songs were translated by other missionaries who replaced J.H. Lorrain and F.W. Savidge, such as Edwin Rowlands etc.

== Middle period ==
The middle period of Mizo literature (1920–1970) saw the rise of prominent writers such as Liangkhaia, who published hundreds of articles in the monthly Kristian Tlangau and authored Mizo chanchin (in two volumes) which contained, besides a coherent treatment of Mizo history, a number of ancient chants and festive songs which he collected from various sources. Besides this, he and his close friends collected various other ancient Mizo poems, publishing it under a single volume Zoram kan lo luh hma Pawi rama kan la awm lai leh Zoram luh tirh vela chhuak ṭante. It contains various Chai hla, Hlado, Zai and a number of Hla. This collection is one of the most reliable sources of knowledge for ancient Mizo poetry.

Authors during this period are usually referred to as Hranghluite in Mizo culture.

=== Poetry ===
==== Awithangpa ====
One of the best known Mizo language poets, Awithangpa (1885–1965) (whose real name is Hmarlûtvunga) was active during this period. The beautiful, innovative expressions he used in his poems are now generally thought by most to be part of Mizo poetic language since time immemorial, although he was the first to use them and were in fact mostly his own coinage. Examples include expressions such as ram loh, chohar di etc. The great reputation of his zai (poems) among Mizo people can be judged from the fact that, although his poems were not initially recorded in writing, when Mizo littérateurs later tried to collect and record his poems, people still remembered most of his poems and could still recite them in full.

=== Prose ===
Well-known writers during this period include Nuchhungi Renthlei (1914–2002), and Lalthangfala Sailo, who got Padma Shri award in Literature in 1986 and 2009 respectively. L. Biakliana (1918–1941), who wrote the first Mizo novel Hawilopari, Kaphleia (1910–1940), C. Ṭhuamluaia (1922–1959), K.C. Lalvunga, J. F. Laldailova, Siamkima Khawlhring etc.

== Modern period ==
=== Books ===
This period of Mizo literature starts in 1970 and continues to the present. The Mizo Academy of Letters started awarding its Book of the Year in 1989. The academy also awards lifetime achievement in Mizo literature. Some of the most prominent writers during this period are James Dokhuma (1932–2008), Khawlkungi (1927–2015), B. Lalthangliana (1945– ), Siamkima Khawlhring (1938–1992), Ralte L. Thanmawia (1954– ), C. Laizawna (1959– ), Laltluangliana Khiangte (1961– ), Lalzuahliana (1962– ), Vanneihtluanga (1959– ), Mafaa Hauhnar (1975–2018), Lalzuia Colney (Padma Shri awardee) etc.

Mizo Book of the Year award recipients
Year	Book	Author	Comments on the book
1989	Ka Lungkham	B. Lalthangliana	Literature
1990	Hmangaihzuali	C. Laizawna	Novel
1991	Zoram Khawvel-I	Lalthlamuong Keivom	Contemporary Mizo history
1992	Ṭhangthar Taitesena	Romawia	Novel
1993	Mizo Literature	B. Lalthangliana	Literature
1994	Kum za Kristian Zofate hmabâk	Bangalore Mizo Christian Fellowship	Collection
1995	Ram leh i tan chauh	H. Lallungmuana	Novel
1996	Bible leh Science	P.C. Biaksiama	Creationism
1997	Pasalṭha Khuangchera	Laltluangliana Khiangte	Drama
1998	Anita	C. Laizawna	Novel
1999	Tlawm ve lo Lalnu Ropuiliani	Lalsangzuali Sailo	Mizo history
2000	Chawngmawii leh Hrangchhuana	R. Rozika	Novel
2001	Ka khualzin kawng	Robuanga	
2002	Runlum Nuthai	L. Z. Sailo	Eulogy
2003	Kan Bible hi	Zairema	Theology
2004	Zorinpari	H. Lalngurliani	Novel
2005	Damlai thlipui	Lalhriata	Novel
2006	Pasalṭhate ni hnuhnung	C. Lalnunchanga	Historical adventure novel
2007	Zofate zinkawngah	R. Zamawia	Factual description and idealisation of Mizo uprising
2008	Chun chawi loh	Lalhriata	Novel
2009	Rintei zùnléng	Lalrammawia Ngente	Novel
2010	Beiseina Mittui	Samson Thanruma	Novel
2011	Zodinpuii (posthumously awarded)	Lalchhantluanga	Novel
2012	Sihlipui	Romuanpuii Zadeng	Novel
2013	Thinglubul	Lalpekkima	Novel
2014	Ka Zalenna	B. Lalhriattira	Essay Collection
2015	Kawlkil piah Lamtluang	C. Lalnunchanga	Fantasy Novel
2016	Aizawlah Aizawler	Lalhruaitluanga Chawngte	Contemporary Social Essays
2017	Savun Kawrfual	Lalhmingchhuanga Zongte	Novel
2018	Hringnun Hrualhrui	Mafaa Hauhnar	Articles
2019	Falung	Lalengzauva	Novel
2020	Eng nge i zawn?	Rema Chhakchhuak	Novel
2021	Hnam Ropuite Tho R'u Le	Lalhruaitluanga Chawngte	Novel
2022	Daidanna Bang Phêna Thuruk	Dr. Zohmangaihi	Novel
2023	Pangparhnima	Amangaihi Khiangte	Novel
2024	Hun Inher Kara Zofate	F. Vanlalrochana	Novel

=== Early Printed Books ===
Book Title	Author	Year
A Colloquial Exercise in the Lushai Dialect of the Dzo or Kuki Language with Vocabularies and Popular Tales	Lewin	1874
Progressive Exercises in Lushai Grammar	Thangliana	-
The Hill Tracts of Chittagong and Dwellers Therein	Thangliana	1869

=== Newspapers ===
The Mizoram Press Information Bureau lists some twenty Mizo daily newspapers just in Aizawl city, as of March 2013. The following list gives some of the most well-known newspapers published in the Mizo language.

Name of newspaper	Publication frequency	Editor	Place
Chhawkhlei	Daily	Lalhmingliana	Champhai
Chhawrpial	Daily	C.Lalzamlova	Aizawl
Chhim Aw	Daily	Baitha	Saiha
Chhinlung	Daily	Vanhnuna	Lunglei
Dumde	Daily	F. Lalbiakmawia (Fam)	Champhai
Harhna	Daily	C.Vulluaia	Aizawl
Hnamdamna	Daily	Chawngchhuma	Lunglei
Hruaitu Arsi	Daily	Zosangliana	Aizawl
Khawpui Aw	Daily	Zaithankhuma	Aizawl
Laisuih	Daily	C.Lalhminghlua	Serchhip
Lengzem chanchinbu	Monthly	Vanneihtluanga	Aizawl
Lenkawl	Daily	Remmawia Kawlni	Serchhip
Lenrual	Daily	Lalhlupuia	Champhai
Pasaltha	Daily	Lalhmingmawia Pachuau	Champhai
Ramlai Arsi	Daily	Lalremruata Ralte	Serchhip
Rihlipui	Daily	DK Lalhruaitluanga	Champhai
Romei	Daily	Robert Lalchhuana	Aizawl
Thu Thar	Daily	A.Rodingliana	Aizawl
Turnipui	Daily	S.Lalhmachhuana	Kolasib
The Zozam Times	Daily	H.Laldinmawia	Aizawl
Vanglaini chanchinbu,	Daily	K. Sapdanga	Aizawl
Zalen	Daily	Vanlalrema Vantawl	Aizawl
Zawlbuk Aw	Daily	Hranghmingthanga	Thenzawl
Zoram Thlirtu	Daily	Lalrinmawia Sailo	Aizawl
Zoram Tlangau	Daily	L.Pachuau	Aizawl
Zorin	Daily	Lalkunga	Aizawl

== See also ==
- Mizo Hlakungpui Mual
