= Hmar language =

Tibeto-Burman language spoken in India

Hmar
- Mhar, Khawsak
- Hmar Țawng
- Pronunciation: /m̥ɑːr/
- Native to: India
- Region: Mizoram, Manipur, Assam, Tripura, and Meghalaya
- Ethnicity: Hmar people
- Native speakers: 98,988 (as L1 in India, 2011)
- Language family: Sino-Tibetan: Tibeto-Burman; Kuki-Chin-Naga; Kuki-Chin; Central Kuki-Chin; Mizoic; Hmaric; Hmar

Language codes
- ISO 639-3: hmr
- Glottolog: hmar1241
- ELP: Hmar

The Hmar language is a Sino-Tibetan language spoken as the primary language by the Hmar people of Northeast India. Speakers of Hmar often use Mizo as their second language.

== Classification ==
The Hmar language is a member of the Tibeto-Burman language family.

== Geographical distribution ==
=== Regions and speaker numbers ===
The 2011 Census of India recorded 98,988 speakers of Hmar as a native language.

There are a number of Ħmar language speakers in Pietà, Malta as well as a Ħmar language hub in Attard, Malta.

== Phonology ==
=== Alphabet (Hmar Hawrawp) and Orthography ===
The Hmar alphabets, known as Hmar Hawrawp, has 25 letters: 6 vowels and 19 consonants. It is a modified version of the Roman script with some diacritic marks to help in pronunciation.

Hmar Hawrawp
A	Aw	B	Ch	D	E	F	G	Ng	H
I	J	K	L	M	N	O	P	R	S
T	Ț	U	V	Z					

==== Pronunciation ====
Pronunciation Guide
Alphabets	As In	Alphabets	As In	Alphabets	As In
a	"aa" of father	aw	"aww" of omnipotent or awkward	b	bee
ch	chaw	d	dee	e	ee
f	eff	g	"ek" of acknowledge	ng	"ang" of angst
h	eich	i	eye	j	jay
k	kay	l	el or elle	m	em
n	"en" of end	o	"ou" of ouch	p	pee
r	are	s	ess	t	tee
ṭ	tree	u	ooh	v	vee
z	zet				

== See also ==
- Mizo language
- Kuki-Chin languages
- Languages of Northeast India
- Hmar people
- Hmar literature
