= Nuchhungi Renthlei =

Indian poet, singer and school teacher

- Born: 1 January 1914; Aizawl, British India
- Died: 1 January 2002 (aged 88)
- Occupation: Writer
- Known for: Mizo poems
- Spouse: R. Rualkhuma
- Children: 6
- Awards: Padma Shri

Nuchhungi Renthlei (1 January 1914 – 1 January 2002) was an Indian poet, singer and school teacher, known for her poems written in Mizo language. She was the founder of Girls' Auxiliary, an organization for women's rights, which she founded in 1939. The Government of India awarded her the fourth highest civilian honour of Padma Shri in 1986.

== Biography ==
Nuchhungi Renthlei was born on the New Year day of 1914 to Hmingliana at Aizawl, in the northeast Indian state of Mizoram, She did her schooling at the Baptist Missionary Society, at Lunglei, Mizoram and started writing at a young age. She continued her writing during her career as a teacher and was also a noted singer during her early years. She is credited with several poems, children's songs and stories and ran a dance school to teach traditional dances to children. She was married to R. Rualkhuma and the couple had five daughters and a son.

The Government of India awarded her the civilian honour of Padma Shri in 1986. She was the third Mizo personality and the first Mizo woman to receive the Padma Shri award.

Renthlei died on her 88th birthday on 1 January 2002.

== See also ==
- Mizo people
- Mizo literature
