= Laltluangliana Khiangte =

Mizo academic, playwright and poet

Latluangliana Khiangte
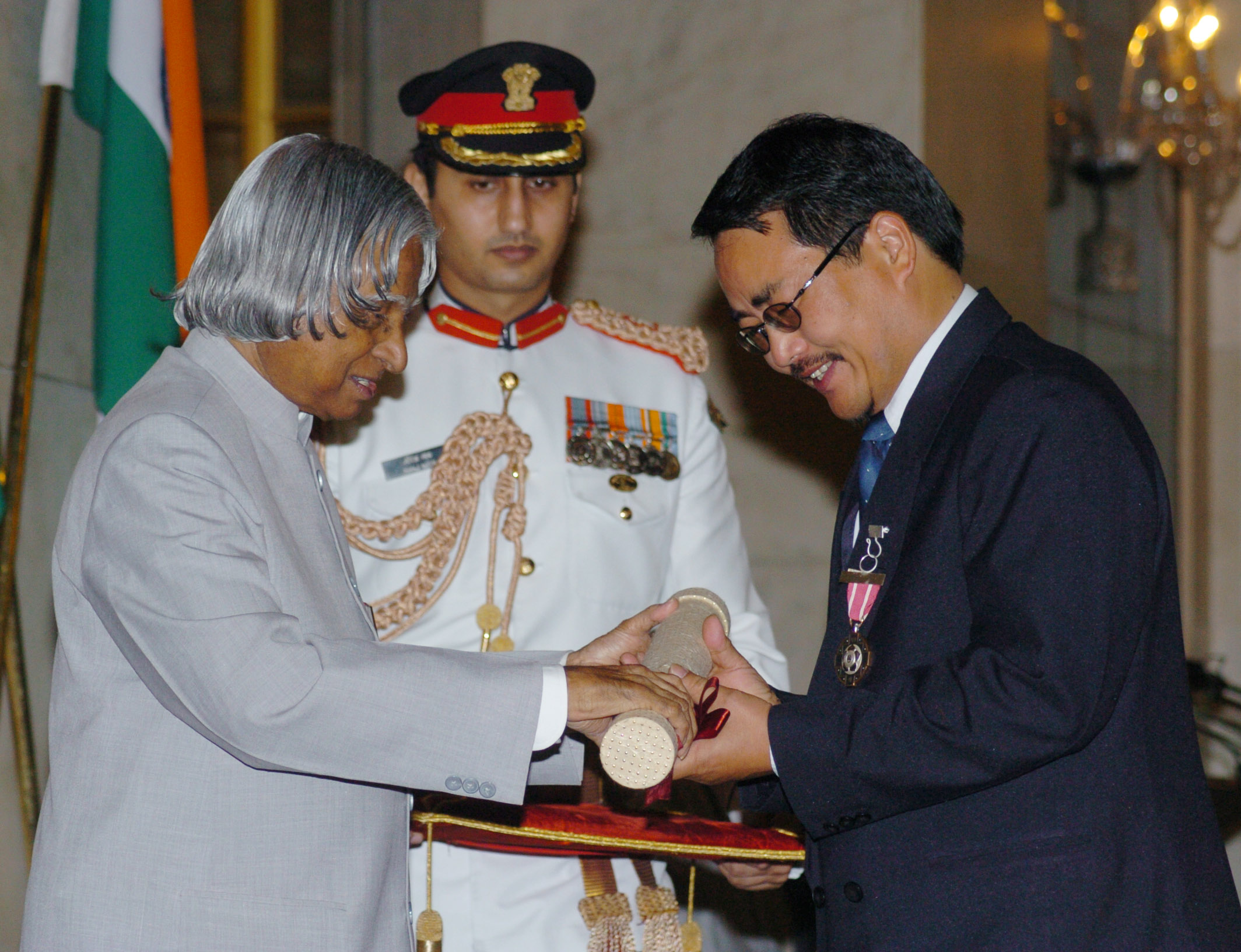
- Laltluangliana receiving Padma Shri from Dr. A.P.J. Abdul Kalam.
- Born: 28 June 1961 (age 65); Mizoram, India
- Occupations: Playwright; Poet; Scholar
- Known for: Mizo literature
- Spouse: Lalramhluni (Mahluni)
- Children: Four sons
- Parent(s): Tlanghmingthanga, Darngeni
- Awards: Padma Shri; Pu Buanga Award; Rashtriya Lok Bhasa Sanman; Bharat Adivasi Sanman; Distinguished Playwright Award; 1997 Book of the Year Award; Lelte Best Writer Award; K. Zawla Award; Khuangchera Award

Latluangliana Khiangte (born 28 June 1961) is an Indian academic, playwright, poet, essayist, critic, biographer, and folklorist writing in the Mizo and English languages. He is a professor in the Department of Mizo at Mizoram University, former dean of the School of Humanities and Languages at Mizoram University, and former principal of Serampore College. He received the Padma Shri, India's fourth-highest civilian award, in 2006 for his contribution to literature and education, and the Sangeet Natak Akademi Award for playwriting in 2018.

== Career ==
Khiangte began teaching Mizo language and literature at Pachhunga University College in Aizawl in 1985. He joined the postgraduate Department of Mizo, then run under North Eastern Hill University's Mizoram campus, as a reader in 1999, and became a full professor in 2005. He later served as principal of Serampore College. He is the senior-most professor in the Department of Mizo at Mizoram University, and edits ''Mizo Studies'', a quarterly peer-reviewed journal published by the department. He obtained a PhD in literature (drama) from North Eastern Hill University in 1991. He has served on the General Council of the Sahitya Akademi and of the Sangeet Natak Akademi, and as vice-president of the All India Tribal Literary Forum.

In May 2025, the Governor of Mizoram released three of his books on Mizo history - biographical works on Lalnu Ropuiliani, Pasaltha Khuangchera and Lal Zakapa - praising his role in documenting Mizo history from an indigenous rather than colonial perspective.

He has supervised over 30 M.Phil. and Ph.D. scholars in the Department of Mizo at Mizoram University and Indira Gandhi National Open University (IGNOU), including work on the translation of English literature into Mizo.

== Mizo Academy of Letters ==
Khiangte served as president of the Mizo Academy of Letters, the principal literary organisation of Mizoram, around 2019, when he represented the academy at a workshop on preserving the Mizo language held with the Mizoram Journalists' Association. By the academy's 60th-anniversary celebrations in November 2024, he was listed as a donor member of the organisation and delivered remarks on its role in Mizo literary development.

== Literary work ==
Khiangte writes plays, poetry, essays, biography and folklore studies, and is regarded as one of the writers who established the modern Mizo play as a distinct literary form, drawing on Mizo village and tribal life for his subject matter. His play Chharmawia was serialised for Doordarshan, and several of his plays and essays have been translated into Hindi, Bengali, Assamese and other Indian languages. His play ''Pasaltha Khuangchera'', about the Mizo resistance leader of the same name, was named the Mizo Academy of Letters' Book of the Year in 1997.

In 2018 he published William Shakespeare Leh A Hnuhma, a study and Mizo translation centred on Shakespeare's Hamlet, released by the Governor of Nagaland; the book was among a wider effort by Khiangte to bring canonical English drama, including Shakespeare's tragedies, to Mizo-language readers.

His 2005 compilation Mizo Lehkhabu Zempui A Compendium of Mizo Bibliography, produced by the Mizoram University Department of Mizo, ranked six of his own books among the 20 best-regarded works out of 100 surveyed titles in Mizo literature. Reviewing his 2017 collection ''Folktales of Mizoram'', literary critic P. V. Laxmiprasad described Khiangte as a scholar-critic and folklorist whose work forms a substantial part of Mizoram's contribution to Indian literature.

== Festschrift ==
On 22 July 2026, Mizoram Chief Minister Lalduhoma released Zawhzawzo Val, a Festschrift on the life and works of Khiangte, along with two other books by him, at an event in Aizawl. Speaking at the release, Lalduhoma called for greater translation of Mizo literary works into English, Hindi, Bengali and other languages and for expanding Mizo-language content online.

The same event saw the release of two further works by Khiangte, ''Lalzika and Vanthangi'' and the co-authored ''Teaching of Mizo Language in Secondary School'', as well as a Bengali translation of ''Pasaltha Khuangchera'' released by Mizoram University Vice-Chancellor Prof. Dibakar Chandra Deka. Deka said Khiangte had represented Mizoram at forums across India and travelled extensively abroad promoting Mizo culture, language, literature and social issues. According to ''Zawhzawzo Val'', 20 of Khiangte's 40 plays have been translated into Hindi and 10 into English, and around 20 of his plays, 20 prose works and 10 poems have been included in the curricula of several Indian universities.

== Editorial and institutional roles ==
Khiangte edits ''Thu leh Hla'', a monthly literary journal, and has edited other periodicals including ''Hruaitu''. He has served on the General Council of the Sahitya Akademi (2003–2007) and the Sangeet Natak Akademi (2004–2008), and as vice-president of the All India Tribal Literary Forum. He edited Writings in Mizo Manuscripts (2018), a volume of papers from a national seminar held at the Department of Mizo, Mizoram University, and sponsored by the National Mission for Manuscripts.

- President, Tribal Literary Forum of India (2018–present)
- President, Mizo Academy of Letters (c. 2019)

== Awards and honours ==
- Mizo Academy of Letters Book of the Year Award (1997)
- Rashtriya Lok Bhasha Samman (2003)
- Bharat Adivasi Samman (2005)
- Padma Shri in Literature & Education (2006)
- Indian Tribal Drama Award (2012)
- Dr. Sam Higginbottom Award for Best Principal of India, AIACHE (2014–15)
- Pu Buanga Award, the highest literary honour of the Mizo Academy of Letters (2010)
- Sangeet Natak Akademi Award for playwriting (2018)

== Selected bibliography ==
- Mizo Songs and Folk Tales, Sahitya Akademi, New Delhi, 2002.ISBN 8126013648
- Tribal Culture, Folklore and Literature, Mittal Publications, New Delhi, 2013.ISBN 8183243347
- A Study of the Mizo Novel, ISPCK/Pothi Publications, New Delhi, 2014.ISBN 9788184653953
- Mizo Folklore: Folktales of Mizoram, Christian World Imprints, New Delhi, 2017.ISBN 9789351482024
- William Shakespeare Leh A Hnuhma (on Shakespeare's Hamlet in Mizo), 2018.ISBN 9788193743850
- Pioneer Tribal (Scholar-Pastor from North East India Liangkhaia), ISPCK, Delhi, 2013.ISBN 9788184652796
- Anti-Colonial Chieftainess Lalnu Ropuiliani, Christian World Imprints, Delhi, 2019.ISBN 9789389490695
- Indigenous Tribal Warrior Pasaltha Khuangchera, LTL Publications, 2025.ISBN 9789389490336
- Lalzika and Vanthangi: Romantic Princess & Ambassador of Peace, LTL Publications, Aizawl, 2026.ISBN 9789389490916
- Teaching of Mizo Language in Secondary Schools, Loisbet Print & Publications, Aizawl, 2026.ISBN 9789389490312

== See also ==
- Mizo literature
- Serampore College
