= L. Z. Sailo =

Indian writer and Indian Army captain

Capt. L. Z. Sailo
- Born: Mizoram, India
- Occupation: Writer
- Awards: 2007 Padma Bhushan

L. Z. Sailo is an Indian writer and a former captain of the Indian Army. His full first name is Lalsangzuali, typically abbreviated L. Z. He has also served in the UN Peace Keeping Force at Congo and one of his books, Runlum Nuthai, was selected as the Mizo Academy of Letters Book of the Year in 2002. The Government of India awarded him the Padma Bhushan, the third highest civilian award, in 2007.
