= Milhiem =

The Milhiems are an ethnic group living in parts of Northeast India and Myanmar. Some writers refer to them as Milhem, Meriem, Mirem, Marrem or Miriam. They belong to the "Old Kuki tribes" of Manipur. The Milhiems believe that they descend from a common ancestor who came from a cave which they call Khul. Their history is based on oral tradition, folklore and myth handed down from one generation to the next. Their society is organised into clans and subclans. The village is the highest unit of society and lands belong to the village chief, who is considered the head of their clan or subclan. Some Milhiem clans and subclans are scattered among other Old Kuki tribes such as the Chothe, Purum, Koireng, Kom, Lamkang, Aimol, Maring, Tarao, Vaiphei, Paite, Lusei and also among the Thadou tribe.

== Origin ==
Miriems claim to originate from a cave which they refer to as Khur. According to their folklore and myths, their ancestor LUPHO, born of Miriem, went out from Khul with his followers after killing the serpent Gulhiemnu, and Tiger keeper and guardian of the cave opening. Lupho Bepa (customary family friend), Shongthu, and the Priest Zahong (Zahang) were all members of the group that came out from Khul. In the days of yore, the Chief used to take up the role of a priest as well. Miriem is the ancestor of the Lupho but Zahong/Zahang is the ancestor of Suantak, Ngoilu, Neitham, Lupheng, Misau, and Leivon. In the book "Chongza genealogy" of the Mangtes, their family priest/Thempu Thangjakhup Misao too, claim that the Misao-Lupheng-Leivon belongs to the Zahong Lineage. Some Miriem are amongst Hmars, Lamkangs, Koms and Nagas as well. As is the way of their ancestor Lupho never offer Sating token offer to elder clan to no one. Lupho is named after Ngoilu, his grandfather. Shongthu is the ancestor of the Munhau, Doungel, Samte, Hangsing, Chongloi, Haokip, Kipgen, Guite (Hauzel, Dousel, Gui Mang, Kul Gen, Kullai) and Thadou (Sitlhou, Singsit, Singson) clans. Zahong is the ancestor of Suantak/Thuantak family that comprises Sihsing (Sailo), Thaute, Khiangte and Ralte clans. The three above ancestors represent separate and distinct genealogies.

== Society ==
The village is the highest unit of Milhiem society. It is ruled by the village chief, who is usually the head of the clan or subclan. Community ownership of land is practiced in some villages. The chief is assisted by selected elders from the village, who are assigned portfolios in the village administration by the chief. Milhiem society is patriarchal; the eldest son inherits the family property and land. Milhiem society is divided into the clans, which are, in order of seniority: Lupho, Lupheng, Lhanghal, Misao, clans are further divided into subclans. Lupheng and Misao are recognised as "notified Scheduled Tribes" (under sub-heading "Any Kuki Tribes") in Mizoram, Assam and Meghalaya.

=== Family structure ===
| Clan Name | Subclans | Subclans | Subclans |
|---|---|---|---|
| Lupho | a) Genealogical line of the progenitor (Lupho)[Mihem, Miching, Vumchong, Hanlal] | b) Pholun, Phomang, Lenglim, Lelngoh, Haosoh and others | |
| Lupheng | a) Hanjou family | b) Lhanghal family | |
| Misao | a) Humtum family | b) Leivon family | |

=== Organisations ===
Some organisations in Milhiem society are ("NEI" in the table refers to Northeast India):

| Original Name | Present Name (since 2000 AD) |
|---|---|
| Milhiem Phungpi Union, NEI | Hangmi Union, NEI |
| Milhiem Youth Association, NEI | Hangmi Student Union, NEI |
| Milhiem Sporting Association, NEI | (defunct) |

== Culture ==
=== Folklore ===
The Milhiems have many myths and folktales, including: Thilha-Gal, Lhangeineng (see below), Lhanghal-Changvai

=== Lhangeineng ===
Long ago there lived a man of the Lupho clan, who married and fathered a lovely daughter called Lhangeineng. She was clever and pretty and possessed a quality quite different from her friends. Lhangeineng, was believed to be the most beautiful and charming girl.

One day, a handsome young man saw how beautiful she was and persuaded her that he was none other than the god of water appearing in the form of a man so that he could woo her.

In his bid to get her, the god of water sent torrential rain over the land, making the Milhiems and their kin run for their lives to Lupho village, sometimes known as Kholmol. The rain continued for many days, the water rising up and up to flood the parts of the mountain where the village was.

As the flood was rising high, the water echoed the name Pho.Pho.Pho... Many families sacrificed their daughters to appease the god, but in vain. Eventually, Lhangeineng understood that the god of water wanted her, and she realised how much he loved her. Seeing the danger her people were in, she resolved to sacrifice herself to the man so that they should not vanish in the flood. Thus Lhangeineng sacrificed her life for her people and normal life was restored to the people in Kholmol Village.

To this day, Milhiems consider a shower of rain as a blessing from Lhangeineng who sacrificed herself for her people.

=== Marriage ===
Marriage outside the clans was strictly prohibited and monogamous marriage was possible within certain clans and subclans. But such taboos are no longer strictly upheld. Elopement is known to occur.

Bride prices are measured in terms of number of Mithum, Gongs shawl and necklaces.

== Religion ==
=== Early practice ===
Milhiems were animists who believed in nature and the environment. They believed in one supreme god called Pathien. They also worshipped a village and household god called Indoi. All religious ceremonies were held and supervised by the religious head (priest) called Thiempu, who is next to the chief in the village hierarchy. Animal sacrifice was practiced for ceremonies of appeasement and cleansing and for other rituals.

== Economy ==
The economy of Milhiem villages is mainly based on agriculture. They practice both wetland and Jhum cultivation. Many Milhiems are also employed in government and nongovernmental organisations.
