= Aimol language =

Sino-Tibetan language spoken in India

Aimol
- Native to: India
- Region: Manipur, Assam
- Ethnicity: Aimol
- Native speakers: 3000 (2011 census)
- Language family: Sino-Tibetan: Tibeto-Burman; Kuki-Chin–Naga; Kuki-Chin; Northwestern; Aimol
- Dialects: Sutpong; Khutai; Langrong
- Writing system: Latin, Meitei (to lesser extent)

Language codes
- ISO 639-3: aim
- Glottolog: aimo1244
- ELP: Aimol
- Aimol is classified as Critically Endangered by the UNESCO Atlas of the World's Languages in Danger.

Aimol, also known as Aimual, is a Kuki-Chin language, belonging to the Northwestern or "Old Kuki" subfamily, spoken by the Aimol people of Manipur, India. It is considered endangered and has less than 3,000 speakers worldwide as per 2011 census. most speakers also use Meitei language as their second language (L2) according to the Ethnologue.

== Geographical distribution ==
Aimol is spoken primarily in the Tengnoupal district, Chandel district, Kangpokpi district, and Churachandpur districts of Manipur. Aimol is spoken in the following villages of Manipur state (Ethnologue). There are also small numbers of speakers in Assam, Mizoram, Tripura, Nagaland.

- Tengnoupal district: Aimol Khullen, Satu, Kumbirei, Chingnunghut, Aimol Tampak, Khodamphai, Aimol Ngairong, Chandonpokpi, Sibong (Khudengthabi), and Khomayai (Khunjai)
- Chandel district: Unapal
- Kangpokpi district: Tuikhang, Kharam Aimol
- Churachandpur district: Luichungbum (Louchulbung), Kha-Aimol

== Name ==
The name of the language comes from the Aimol tribe of people who speak it. The word Aimol itself may come from the words Ai meaning "wild" and Mol meaning "hill".

== Genealogical affiliation ==
Aimol is an Old Kuki language. The language displays similar characteristics as other Old Kuki including Hmar, Kom, Koireng, Kharam, Purum, Chiru, Chothe, Tarao, etc. However, most of the Old Kuki languages are not mutually intelligible with Aimol. Additionally, Aimol is reportedly less influenced by Meitei, the lingua franca of the state of Manipur, as compared to the other neighboring languages. Aimol is mutually intelligible with Kom. Speakers of the respective languages can understand each other when speaking in their own language. In terms of numeric structures, the two languages demonstrate extreme grammatical and structural similarities. In the Linguistic Survey of India, Grierson reported that all the Old Kuki languages, including Aimol, are all merely dialects of the same language. He also reported that these Old Kuki languages are closely related to the Central Kuki languages.

== Status ==
The Aimol people are predominantly Christian and this community has helped with preserving the language. The New Testament has been translated, and there are significant audio samples of the language in the form of Bible studies and Gospel Songs. Aside from this there are several books as well as radio programs in Aimol.

Meitei is the official language of Manipur and the lingua franca amongst the various tribes in the region. Most Aimol speakers are completely fluent in Meitei with many also speaking Hindi and English for the same reasons. Meitei is the language of education with Aimo not being used in school and instead being used in the home. The strong influence of the lingua franca is a considerable threat to the continued existence of Aimol and its survival in future generations. However, there have been efforts to preserve the Aimol culture, including the language.

The Aimol people themselves have a large amount of pride in their language and have taken effort to preserve it and encourage its usage.

== Phonology ==
Vowels
	Front		Central	Near-back		Back
	Short	Long	Short	Short	Long	Long
Close	i	iː				
Near-close	e			ʊ	ʊ:	
Mid			ə			
Open-Mid		ɛː				ɔ:
Open		aː				ɒ

=== Phonotactics ===
Aimol has a relatively high consonant to vowel ratio of 4.5-1 and /CCVC/ syllable structure.

== Morphology and Syntax ==
=== Syntax ===
Aimol follows the traditional subject-object-verb word order, like the other Tibeto-Burman languages, and uses postposition instead of preposition. Tone is an important feature of the language, as the certain pitch used can indicate multiple different words.

=== Pronouns ===
Aimol uses both suffixes and prefixes as pronouns, but the suffixes are only used in negative sentences.

Prefix pronouns in Aimol
	Singular	Plural
1st person	kə-	kən-
2nd person	nə-	nən-
3rd person	ə-	ən-

Suffix Pronouns in Aimol
	Singular	Plural
1st person	-kiŋ	-siŋ
2nd person	-ce	-ceu
3rd person	-k	-u

=== Gender ===
Aimol does not have grammatical gender but it lexically differentiates 3 genders: Male, Female, and Neuter. All words have Male and Female versions with the male version having the suffix /-pa/ and the female version having the suffiv /-nu/; in words with a neuter version the neuter version has neither suffix.

Proper Names in Aimol that end in the suffixes:-pa, -tʰəŋ, -kʰup, -boi, -ŋir, -reŋ, -lal, soŋ, and -pu are considered to be male while those that end in:-nəi, -kim, -hui, -pi, -nu, and -kip are considered female. The suffix /-pu/ is an honorific suffix for men while /-pi/ is an honorific suffix for woman.

For animals the suffix /-kʰoŋ/ is male for birds and /-cəl/ is male for animals, insects, and plants while the suffix /-pui/ is female. For plants the male marker is used for barren plants while the female marker is used for ripe ones.

Gendered Suffixes in Aimol
Male	Translation	Female	Translation	Neuter	Translation
suəkpa	Male slave	suəknu	Female slave	suək	Slave
pəsəlnai	boy	numəinai	girl	N/a	N/a
sehrat-cəl	bull	sehrat-pui	cowl		
watʰəpi-cəl	Male Papaya	watʰəpi-pui	Female Papaya		

=== Plural ===
The suffix /-ŋai/ is used to pluralize nouns; it can be added to proper nouns to imply plurality, or added to demonstrative pronouns to create plurality. The suffix /-ni/ is used after pronouns to pluralize them.

Pluralization of nouns in Aimol
Singular	Translation	Plural	Translation
naipəŋ	Child	naipəŋ-ŋai	Children
coŋnu	Chongu	coŋnu-ŋai	Chongu and her group
kəi	I	kəi-ni	We
hiwǝhi	This	hiwa-ŋai-hi	These

Plurality can also be conveyed via deduplication with /tu-/ meaning "who is" and /tutu-/ meaning "who are" and /i-/ being able to be reduplicated to go from meaning "what thing" to meaning "what things".

The final method of forming the plural is to use various words that convey plurality; these words include:/ətəm/ “many/much”, /əbo/ “pair”, /əbuk/ “pile”, /əreŋŋa/ “all”, /ərup/ “crowd”, /alo/ “bundle”, /awer/ “some”.

There are very few written records of the Aimol language. Much of what has been recorded were samples from Grierson. Younger generations use Latin script, while older generations use "Manipuri written in Bengali script." Additionally, a version of the Bible has been recently completed and released. This should greatly benefit the translation and preservation process.

=== Numerals ===
Cardinal numbers in Aimol are formed by using simple addition and/or multiplication compounds. The numbers between 11-19 are formed by taking the word for ten som and the respective number between 1–9, and using the connective word ləj. For example, the word for fifteen is som-ləj-raŋa, which is formed by the words for ten-connective-five. The decade, century, and thousand numbers are formed by using a multiplication compound. To illustrate this principle further, the word for three hundred is rethum, which is formed by the root re-, and the word for three ənthum (the prefix ən- is dropped). Finally, for the numbers not divisible by 10, the two principles are combined. The word for 22 is somniləjthum, which translate to ten-two-connective-two. In this instance, ten and two are multiplied to equal twenty which is connected to two.

==== Ordinal Numerals ====
Ordinal numerals are formed by adding the suffix cəŋnə to the base number. For example, second is expressed as ənni-cəŋnə, meaning two-necessary suffix.

==== Multiplicative Numerals ====
Adding the prefix wəj- to a base numeral results in a multiplicative numeral. Fifth is expressed by wəj-rəŋə, the prefix to the base word for 5.

==== Fractional Numerals ====
To express fractions, the prefix sem- is added to the denominator number, followed by the connective -ə-, and then the word for the numerator. To express the fraction two-fifths, the word in Aimol is sem-rəŋə-ə-ənni.

== Dialects ==
The Langrong variety is distinct enough that some consider it a separate language. There are two dialects of Aimol proper, Sutpong and Khurai, which can perhaps be attributed to differing migration patterns, there are small differences between the two but they are completely mutually intelligible.

Most occurrences of Aimol writing are in Sutpong. This version makes use of glottal stops in word endings preceding by vowel sounds. Speakers of this dialect tend to take pride in speaking this dialect over Khurai.

Khurai usually does not use the glottal stops as is present in Sutpong. There is also less use of initial nasalized sounds in Khurai. There may be negative interpretations of the word Khurai which lead to the negativity with the dialect. Additionally, the Khurai dialect is understood to borrow more words from Meitei and other neighboring languages, though it is indisputable that both dialects take from and are influenced by other languages.

== Sample Text ==
1st Thessalonians 1-2
Aimol	English
Paul, Silas hale Timothi ning Thessalonika biakrup mingai chunga pa pathian le Jisu Khrista jiang a om mi lungsiat thei nale lunghip na ha nan chunga na pek rase. Keinin nangni ranga phat rakip a Pathian jiang lam na kan nei hale Pathian ha kan manpak.	Paul, Silas[a] and Timothy,To the church of the Thessalonians in God the Father and the Lord Jesus Christ: Grace and peace to you. We always thank God for all of you and continually mention you in our prayers.

== See also ==
- Aimol people
- Kuki people
- Tibeto-Burman languages
- Linguistic Survey of India
