= Khelma people =

Old kuki tribe from Northeast India

Sakachep
Total population
- approx. 5,000

Regions with significant populations

Languages
- Sakachep

Religion
- Predominantly Presbyterianism

Related ethnic groups
- Mizo · Hmar · Chin · Kuki

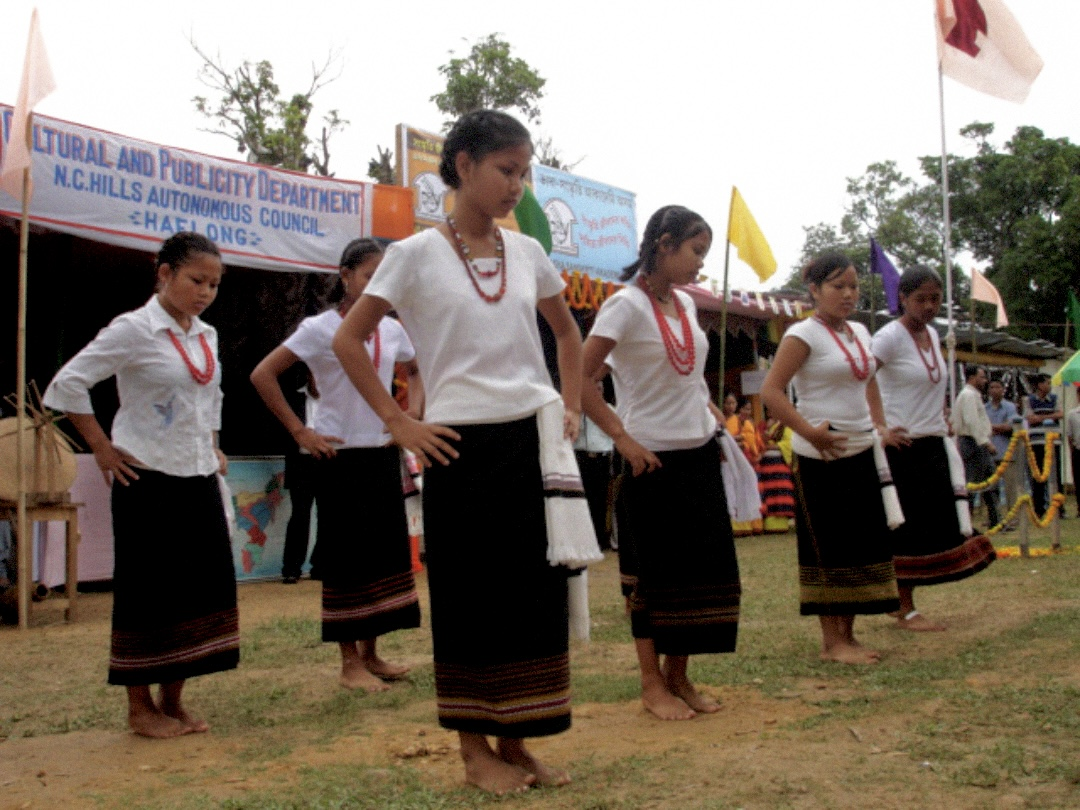
Khelma women dancing

The Khelma, also known as the Sakachep, are one of the Old Kuki tribes of northeastern parts of India. The Sakachep call themselves Riam or munisi (lit. 'human being').

== Culture ==
Their life style and habits closely resemble the other tribes of the Chin-Kuki-Mizo people. Among the inhabitants of the Dima Hasao district, the Sakachep are one of the smallest communities. The Sakachep are similar in language, customs and traditions to the Biate, Hrangkhol Aimol, Chothe, Chiru, Kharam, Koireng, Kom, Purum, Chorei, Ranglong, Molsom, Hrangkhol, Kaipeng, Bongcher and Thiek-Hmar. They used to cremate their dead like the neighboring plains native people in the past.
