= Tarao =

Tarao may refer to:

- Tarao language, in Burma
- Tarao people, Manipur, India
- Tarao (comics), a comic book series by Roger Lécureux.

== See also ==
- Tarao Naga (disambiguation)
- Taroa Island, east of Maloelap Atoll in the Marshall Islands
- Taraon
