= Halam tribe =

Halam (Rwm)Riam, Old Kuki)
Total population
- 58,000 (approx.)

Regions with significant populations
- India; Tripura; Bangladesh

Languages
- Mizo-Kuki-Chin • Kaipeng · Molsom • Chorei • Ranglong · Hrangkhol · Sakachep · Bawng · Saimar · Dab

Religion
- Christianity · Hinduism · Animism

Related ethnic groups
- Chin · Kuki · Mizo

The Halam community are various tribes native to the state of Tripura in India. The name Halam was coined by the Tipra Maharaja. As per their oral tradition they called themselves "Riam", which literally means "human being". And lyrically they also call themselves "Riamrai, Chepvon, Reivon, Longvon etc.". The Halam are further divided into 12 sub-tribes, namely Sakachep, Chorei, Molsom, Hrangkhol, Kaipeng, Kalai, Ranglong, Thangachep, Bongcher, Korbwng, Dab and Rupini.

== History ==
In terms of ethnology and language, the Halam community group belongs to Old Kuki groups. According to their own belief and tradition the Halam originated from a place called 'Khurpuitabum' meaning 'a big cave,’ which is supposed to be somewhere in south central China. This theory of origin is very common among the Kuki-Chin-Mizo groups with slight variations in name. Apart from Halam group, the Old Kuki tribes like Chorei, Khelma/Sakachep, Aimol, Ranglong, Hrangkhol inhabit in the Karimganj district of Assam, North Tripura and Dhalai district of Tripura and Mizoram. (B. Lalthangliana, 2001, Mizo Chanchin, Remkungi, Aizawl, p. 37)

According to S.B.K. Dev Varman, the Halam community coined by Tipra Maharaja (S.B.K. Dev Varman, The Tribes of Tripura, p. 35). The Halam group are said to be migrated from 'Khurpuitabum,’ a place in the hills just to the north of Manipur (Ibid. p. 35). Those of the Kukis, who had submitted to the Tripura Raja, came to be known as Halam (http://www.tripuratribes.ac.in).

Regarding the origin of the term 'Halam,’ some suggest that 'Halam' means 'killer of human beings' (K.S. Singh, People of India, Vol. V, p. 1243). Perhaps, the neighboring people might name them 'Halam' as they were ferocious and used to killed strangers in olden days. The term 'Halam' is expected to be coined by others. One interpretation is that, in Tripuri language, 'Ha' means 'earth' and 'Lam' means 'route'. So it means 'earth route.' It is said that when they came in contact with the king of Tripura, the Maharaja had given them the title 'Halam.' From this definition, it can be presumed that Halam migrated to their present place of settlement through earth route. However, there is no agreed point on the origin of the term 'Halam.' In the Scheduled Castes and Scheduled Tribes orders (Amendment) Act. 1976, Halam is placed at No. 6 in the list of Scheduled Tribes of Tripura.

== Changes in religious practices ==
Conversion to Christianity started around the mid-1900s. About 30% of the Halam are Christian. The spread of Christianity among the Halam does not interfere with cultural activities (except religious activities). The Christian Halam attended the socio-cultural ceremonies of their Hindu neighbors. They participate in and depend on the traditional village administration as do their Hindu neighbors. There is a reason why the Tripura Raja differentiate Halam from Kuki, Halam people do not have king or chief nor their own god to worship. So, the Raja appointed Sordar to rule Halam people, and an idol for each clan to worship. E.g. Mualţhuam/Molsom sub-tribe are given an idol made from Gooseberry tree, they called Zobawmthang. Bawngcher sub-clan are given Thirlum Thirphrai. Thirlum is an iron ball smaller than the size of cricket ball, Thirphrai is an iron plate, a size of thumb. Both have no inscriptions on them.

== Diaspora ==
During the British Raj, the Halam of Tripura were transported to the Sylhet region to work in tea plantations. They can still be found in Sylhet and Habiganj districts of Bangladesh, where they continue this livelihood. They make up a population of only 5000. Use of the Kokborok language is rapidly decreasing with the Bengali language being more common nowadays. They are divided into 12 clans; Machafang, Migli, Chorei, Bongcher, Hrangkhol, Kalai, Molsom, Rupini, Mitahar, Langkai, Ranglong and Kaipeng.
