= Khelma =

Khelma may refer to:

- Khelma people or Sakachep, one of the old Kuki tribe from northeast India
- Khelma language or Sakachep, their Kuki-Chin (Sino-Tibetan) language
- Khelma, Peren, Nagaland, India
