= Ranglong people =

Ethnic group in Northeast India

Total population
- no census

Languages
- Ranglong

Religion
- Christianity; folk religion

Related ethnic groups
- Northeastern Hmaric-speaking peoples; (Guite, Paite, Sukte, Thadou, Zou, Mizo people)

Ranglong or Langrong people form an ethnic group in Northeast India. Their main concentration is in Tripura, where they are considered a sub-tribe of Halam people. Considerable numbers also live in Assam and Mizoram. They speak the Ranglong (or Langrong) language, which is considered a dialect of the Halam language.

== History ==
The term Ranglong is used interchangeably with Langrong by different scholars and writers. For instance, G. H. Damant and G. A. Grierson used the term Ranglong, while C. A. Soppitt used Langrong. At present, the people identify themselves with the term Ranglong, although some of their co-related ethnic tribes like the Mizo and Thadou use Langrong.

G.H. Damant categorized Ranglong with the Old Kukis of the greater Tibeto-Burman language family. Some of the ethnic tribes that speak those languages are the Biate, Khelma, Rangkhol, Koren, Aimol, and Chiru peoples, among others. The categories of Old and New Kuki are used to identify them in relation to their period of migration and contact with the plain population of northeast India.

In trying to distinguish between the two Kuki groups, G.A. Grierson further said, 'Not only do their customs and institutions differ considerably, but their languages are separated by a large group of dialects in the Lushai and Chin Hills. The so-called New Kukis are, so far as we can see, a Chin tribe, most closely related to the inhabitants of the Northern Chin Hills, while the Old Kukis are related the tribes more to the south'.

Since the Ranglong tribe is Old Kuki, their origin and phases of migration are the same as other Kuki-Chin ethnic groups. They were believed to have migrated from some Chinese provinces to Myanmar and to northeast India. The Ranglongs used to chant in a folk song, "Nei omna Durnai phai", meaning "our place of settlement is Durnai Valley". Durnai Valley is believed to be the Kabaw Valley of present-day Myanmar (formerly Burma). There is no tangible evidence as to why the Ranglongs migrated from the Kabaw Valley of Burma. G. H. Damant said that the so-called Kukis "are a migratory race, living by jhum cultivation and preferring the densest forests". After their migration from the Kabaw Valley, they entered the Champhai district of Mizoram (then Lushai Hills) from approximately 1200 to 1300 CE.

They then moved farther towards the Churachanpur district of present Manipur, and settled in and around the confluence of the Tiruong and Tivai rivers, which is commonly known as Tipai (mukh) in Bengali. It is also called Tuiruong and Tuivai. The accent of the term Tivai was changed to Tipai in Bengali, and the confluence of Tiruong and Tivai became known as Tipaimukh. The two rivers joined and flowed in a western direction, getting the name Barak in the Barak Valley of Assam. In memory of those old settlements, the Ranglongs would chant "Rili champhai zol", meaning "Rili Champhai plains". Li or dil means a lake or pond in the Kuki-Chin language. It (rili) is a large lake in Myanmar, adjoining the Champhai revenue district of Mizoram and occupying an important place in the history and culture of Kuki-Chin ethnic groups. They still have a sense of belonging to that lake due to its direct linkages with their social history. The Ranglong would also chant "Ruonglevaisuo kati", which means "on the bank of the confluence of river Tiruong and Tivai where we used to settle".

The settlement of the Ranglong at the confluence of the Tiruong and Tivai (Tipaimukh) rivers may date to approximately 1500 to 1600 CE. From there, they followed the river downstream till they reached Barak Valley and thereafter dispersed in different directions. Considerable numbers of the Ranglong population even migrated to the extent of Sylhet district of Bangladesh. This is evident from G.A. Grierson's comparison of the population of Ranglong language speakers in Sylhet and the North Cachar Hills. Most of them came back from Sylhet following the river Langkei (Longai in Bengali), the river Juri in present North Tripura district, and the river Dhalai in the Dhalai district of Tripura.

== Present settlements ==
The present settlement of Ranglong is found in three states; Tripura, Assam, and Mizoram, having a total population of approximately 37 thousand Ranglong individuals. It is unclear whether they are still in existence in the Sylhet district of Bangladesh, Manipur and Myanmar. There is limited information about their existence in those regions. In the state of Tripura they are mainly concentrated in the hilly terrain of the North Tripura revenue district, under Dharmanagar and Panisagar revenue sub-division, bordering Assam, and in the Dhalai district of Tripura. Most of the Ranglong villages in Tripura are found adjacent to National Highway No. 08, with a few exceptions located a distance of five to ten kilometers away. Considerable numbers of Langkei and Dap clans of the Ranglong community are also found in a few interior villages of Kamalpur and Ambassa. In Assam, they are concentrated in the Patherkandi revenue circle of Karimganj district, mostly on the bank of the river Longai bordering Tripura and Mizoram. A few villages are also under the Katlicherra revenue circle of Hailakandi district, and Sonai revenue circle of Cachar district of Assam. In Mizoram, the Ranglongs settled in Zawlnuam sub-division of Mamit district.

The Ranglongs have been settled in their current locations for around the last 400 to 500 years. This is evident from the names of the places in their locality that are officially recognized by the governments of Assam, Tripura and Mizoram. For instance, there is a river called Longai used as an inter-state boundary among the three mentioned Indian federated states. This river connects the Patherkandi revenue circle of the Karimganj district of Assam, the Panisagar revenue sub-division in north Tripura and the Mamit revenue district of Mizoram. The term Longai is a Bengali version of Ranglong terminology called Langkei. Because of the linguistic unfamiliarity of the plains populations, the accent of Langkei has changed into Longai. In fact, the word Langkei is sometimes one of the names of the Ranglong people. Within the native dwellers, and even by the government of Mizoram, the river is still recognised as Langkei rather than the alternative version. Since they are believed to be the first settlers on the bank of river Langkei, the river ultimately got the name from the native dwellers. Similarly, there is a name of a locality officially called Solgoi in the Patherkandi revenue circle of Karimganj revenue district of Assam. It is, however. an incorrect pronunciation of the Ranglong word solngui, which is actually the name of a flower found naturally in that area, and so that particular area was named after the solngui flower. The Ranglongs once settled in Solgoi areas before moving the upstream of the river Langkei (Longai) bordering Mizoram and Tripura.

=== Ranglong as a distinct community ===
The Ranglong community has become a minority in their present respective Indian federated states. The Ranglong language has also been declared by the United Nations Educational, Scientific, and Cultural Organization (UNESCO) as a critically endangered language among the 42 languages and 197 endangered languages in India according to the Press Information Bureau, Government of India, MHRD, 6th Aug. 2014. The Ranglong people have been amalgamated with other Indian groups since colonisation. However, scholars have clarified them as a distinct people. G. H. Damant identified the Ranglong community under Old Kuki as distinct from the Bete, Khelma and Rangkhol Communities. C. A. Soppit also clearly referenced the community of Ranglong. G. A. Grierson had again identified the Ranglong as a separate community and accordingly undertook detailed linguistic research on Ranglong language. T. C. Hodson did the same.

Furthermore, Colonel Shakespeare highlights the Ranglong language as distinct to other tribal languages. Kenneth VanBik, in his research works on, 'Proto-Kuki-Chin: A Reconstructed Ancestor of the Kuki-Chin Language' grouped the Ranglong with Old Kuki as against Halam, Rangkhol, Aimol, etc. M. K. Bhasin, in his research works, 'Genetics of Castes and Tribes of India: Indian Population Milieu' also clearly identifies the Ranglong as a separate community alongside Lushai/Mizo, Rangkhol, Halam, etc.

At present, the status of the community is such that it has no official recognition as Ranglong in their respective federated states. The respective state administration has instead merged them with different communities. The Ranglongs in Tripura has been merged with the Halam and Tripuri Communities, whereas in Assam they have been merged with the Kuki, Rangkhol/Hrangkhawl and Tripuri Communities. In Mizoram, they were merged with Rangkhol/Hrangkhawl and any other Mizo tribes (as per the Scheduled Caste and Scheduled Tribes Orders 'Amendment' Act 1976).

Due to their merging with different communities in three federated states in India, most members of the Ranglong community are using the new groups with whom they were merged as their surname. They are officially compelled to identify themselves to a community with which the state government has merged them. However, both young and older generations of the Ranglongs have been slowly and steadily regaining their old identity in recent years. They have been identifying themselves very vocally in their distinct as 'Ranglong' and have acknowledged their common identity through diverse socio-cultural activities. The Ranglong Youth Association (RYA), a registered association under Societies Registration Act of 1860 and the only umbrella organization, has been playing a significant role for the socio-cultural uplift of the Ranglong community since its inception in 1994. There is anticipation among the Ranglongs that unless the respective state administration does not take some proactive measures to support this change then they may continue to be victims of injustice.

=== Old Kuki tribes in Tripura: Ranglong, Hrangkhol and Halam ===
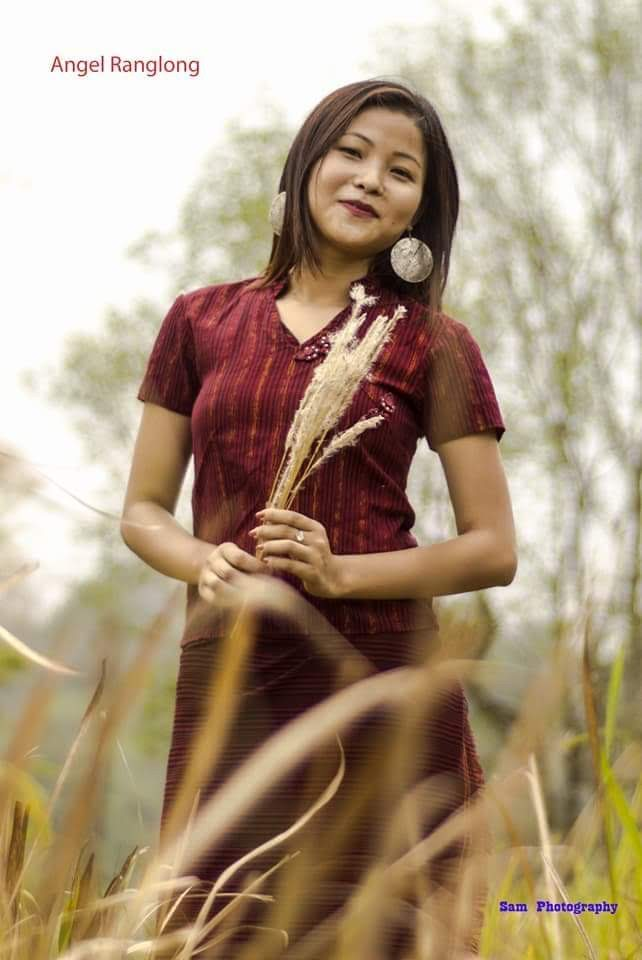
A Ranglong girl with hnampon/nampon (Ranglong attire)

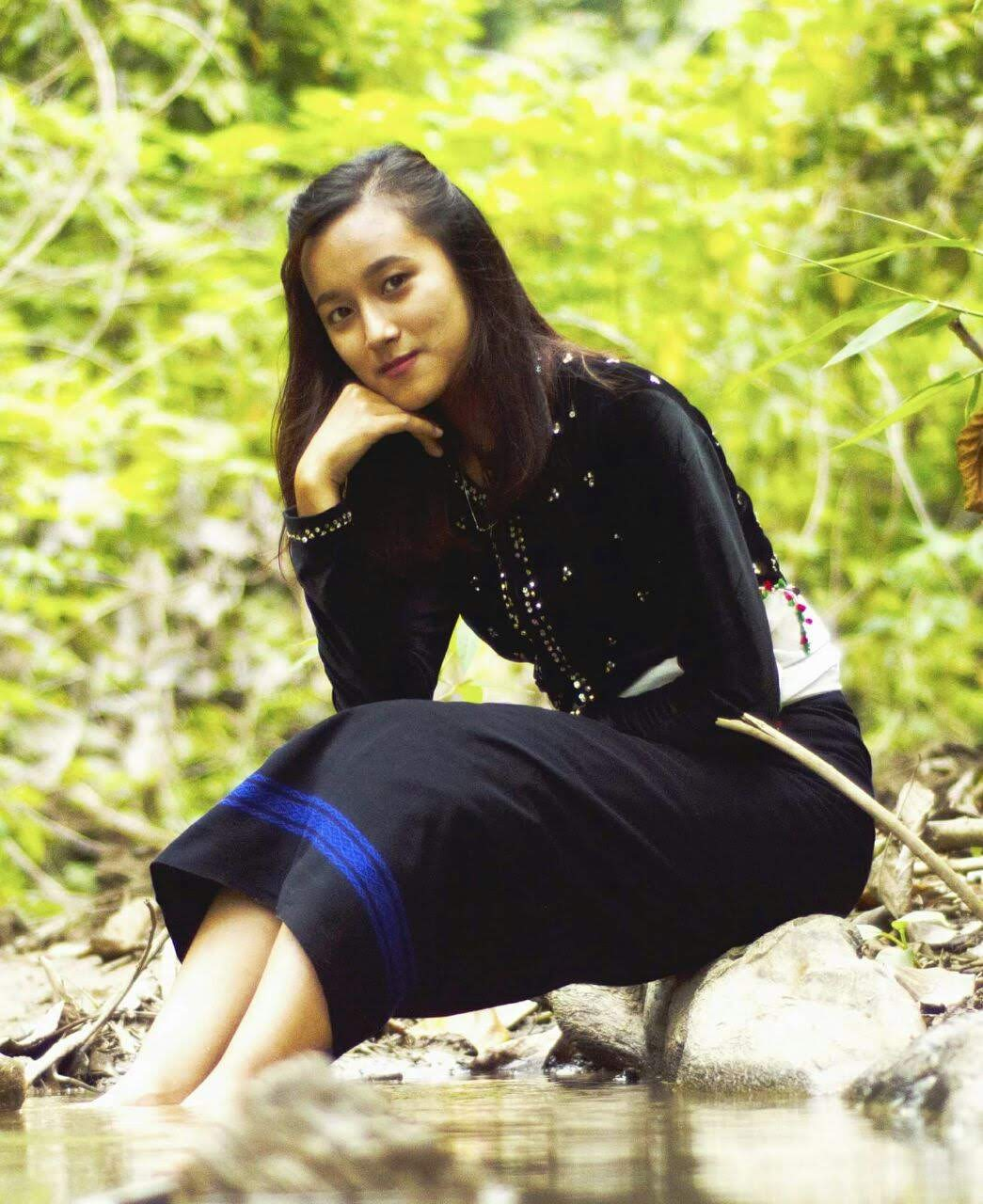
A Ranglong girl

The tribes belonging to the Kuki in India and Chin in Burma are the same. The first known reference to the term Kuki was made in 1777 CE in connection to the tribesmen who attacked the British subjects in Chittagong when Warren Hastings was made the Governor General of Bengal. There are many theories about the origin of the word Kuki. Some believe that it derives from the Baluchistan word kuchi, meaning "wandering people". Some others said that it comes from the word kooky, meaning "peculiar or unusual people". Prim S. Vaiphei believes that it was a derogatory name given to the outsiders to an ethnic group of people living in western Burma, North East India, and Bangladesh.

According to G. H. Damant, the Ranglong, Bete, Khelma and Rangkhol were the Old Kukis. According to T. C. Hodson, the Ranglong, Rangkhol, Bete, Hallam, Aimol, Kolren, Kom, Cha, Mhar, Anal, Hiroi-Lamgang and Puru' were identified as belonging to the Old Kuki group. Again, according to Kenneth VanBik, the Ranglong, Aimol, Chiru, Purum, Kom, Hrangkhol, Halam, Kolhreng, Luhupa, Tarau, Anal, Biate, and Vaiphei were also categorized as Old Kuki. It is difficult to clearly differentiate the Old Kuki and New Kuki considering the present socio-cultural setting among hill tribes. As per the Scheduled Tribes Orders Second (Amendment) Acts, 2002, the Government of India identifies some tribal communities in the northeastern states under Kuki and not necessarily as Old Kuki and New Kuki.

As per the identification and categorization of Old Kuki tribes by the above-mentioned scholars, there are three tribes found in Tripura. They are the Ranglong, Rangkhol and Halam.' According to the record of the Scheduled Tribes List, most of the other Old Kuki tribes are at present found in Manipur and Assam and a few of them are also found in Mizoram. (for further information, please see Scheduled Tribes Orders Second (Amendment) Acts, 2002, Government of India) However, the official recognition of the Old Kuki tribes in Tripura is now in different forms. The Ranglong tribe is now merged with Halam, the Rangkhol/Hrangkhawl with Kuki and the Hallam/Halam is directly recognized as the Halam tribe. As the earlier scholars grouped both the Ranglong and Hallam under Old Kuki, it could be inferred that the migratory route of the two Old Kuki tribes must be the same. Hence, it can be further surmised that there must have been a huge magnitude of population intermixture between the two tribes. S. B. K. Dev Varman comments that, "[The Ranglong] came into contact with the ruling dynasty of the day and accepted the suzerainty of the kings of Tripura. They are known as 'Mila Kukis' also. The Kukis call them 'Ranglong".

As the Ranglong are officially merged with the Halam, regardless of the Ranglong being identified as a separate tribe from the Halam under Old Kuki by many renowned scholars, the majority of the Ranglongs had used Halam as their surname. But as the Ranglong began to recuperate their past distinct identity, they have gradually started using the tribe's name (Ranglong) as their surname. At present, the Ranglongs are having well awareness of their distinct identity as a separate tribe. They have been acknowledging their identity as Ranglong in different socio-cultural activities. They have their own distinct and organized customary law called Halamasa which is a customary law given by the then Tripura Maharajas. It has been practiced for last fifty years (approximately) and major disputes within the group are solved and adjudicated on the basis of their customary law. Internal disputes among themselves hardly reach the general court, accepting a few cases that are beyond the capacity to be solved by the village-level council.

Although the Ranglongs understand that many renowned scholars identify and categorise the two tribes, Ranglong and Halam, as distinct and separate, they (the Ranglong) still identify themselves as Halam relating to any official matter that is beyond the purview of the Ranglong tribes. So, many Ranglongs (accepting some of them) who identify as 'Ranglong' within their locality identify themself as Halam if they are physically outside or beyond the local areas and especially among the non-Scheduled Tribes populace. For instance, if a Ranglong from Koileng (Bagbasa) of North Tripura identifies as 'Ranglong' within that locality, they may also identify as belonging to the Halam tribe after reaching Dharmanagar town of North Tripura. As the Ranglong tribe is officially merged with the Halam tribe, few people outside the inhabited areas of Ranglong know about the separate existence of the Ranglong tribe. Hence, for any official purpose and for making any sort of official correspondence they have to identify themselves as Halam for ease.

== Religion ==
Most Ranglong people follow Christianity, while the rest mainly practice folk religion and certain rituals.

== Sources ==
- Bhasin, M. K. (2006). "Genetics of Castes and Tribes of India: Indian Population Milieu". Int J Hum Genet. 6 (3). Delhi: University of Delhi: 233–274. doi:10.1080/09723757.2006.11885969. S2CID 52205468.
- Bhasin, M. K. (2007), 'Racial, Ethnic, Religious and Linguistic Elements in Indian Population' in Journal of 'Indian Anthropology' India: Haryana.
- Damant, G. H. (April 1880). "Notes on the Locality and Population of the Tribes dwelling between the Brahmaputra and Ningthi Rivers". Journal of the Royal Asiatic Society of Great Britain & Ireland. 12 (2): 228–258. doi:10.1017/s0035869x00017494. ISSN 0035-869X. S2CID 162006568. Art. VIII.
- Geertz, Clifford (1973), 'The Interpretation of Cultures' Chicago: Basic Books publisher
- Government of India, Ministry of Human Resource Development, (2014), 'Protection and Preservation of Endangered Languages in India,' New Delhi, India.
- Government of India, Ministry of Home Affairs, 'The Scheduled Caste and Scheduled Tribes Orders (Amendment) Act', 1976.]
- Grierson, G.A. (1904), 'The Linguistic Survey of India' Vol. III, Part-III, New Delhi: Kalpaz Publication.
- Halam, T. (2013), 'An Introduction to the History of Ranglong,' Agartala: Tribal Research Institute, Tripura.
- Hodson, T. C. (1911). The Naga Tribes of Manipur. London: Macmillan and Co.
- Isaacs, H. Robert (1975), 'Idols of the Tribe: Group Identity and Political Change' Cambridge, Mass.: Harvard University Press.
- Khoilamthang, (2001), 'A Phonological Reconstruction of Proto Chin' Chiang Mai: Payap University, Thailand.
- Mackenzie, A. (1884), 'History of the Relations of the Government of with the Hill Tribes of North-East Frontier of Bengal' Calcutta: Home Department Press.
- Matisoff, J.A., Baron, S.P., and Lowe, J.B. (1996), 'Languages and Dialects of Tibeto-Burman,' Center for Southeast Asia Studies, Monograph Series No. 2, Berkeley: University of California.
- Mortensen, D, and Keogh, J. (2011), 'Sorbung, an Undocumented Language of Manipur: Its Phonoplgy and Place in Tibeto-Burman' in 'Journal of the South Asian Linguistic Society' Vol. 4(1).
- Shakespeare, C. (1912). The Lushei Kuki Clan. Berkeley: University of California.
- Soppit, C. A. (1887). A short Account of the Kuki-Lushai Tribe on the North-East Frontier. Cambridge, Mass.: Harvard University Press.
- Thurgood, G, and LaPolla, J.R. Edition, (2003), 'The Sino-Tibetan Languages' London: Routledge Publication.
- Yetman R. Norman (1991), 'Majority and Minority: The Dynamics of Race and Ethnicity in American Life' Boston: Allyn and Bacon publisher.
- Young Q. Philip (2000), 'Ethnic Studies: Issues and Approaches' New York: State University of New York.
- VanBik, Kenneth (2009). Proto-Kuki-Chin: A reconstructed ancestor of the Kuki-Chin languages. STEDP Monograph Series. Berkeley: University of California.
- Van den Berghe, L. Pierre (1987), 'The ethnic phenomenon' London: Preager
