= Thiek language =

Sino-Tibetan language spoken in India

Ṭhiek
- Thiek, Thriek, Thiak
- Ṭhiek Ṭawng
- Native to: India
- Region: Dima Hasao district, Assam
- Ethnicity: Ṭhiek, a subgroup of the Hmar people
- Native speakers: c. 3,100 (2016)
- Language family: Sino-Tibetan: Tibeto-Burman; Kuki-Chin; Central; Hmaric; Ṭhiek

Language codes
- ISO 639-3: –
- Glottolog: thie1234

The Ṭhiek (also Thiek or Thriek or Thiak) language is spoken primarily by the Ṭhiek people, a subgroup of the Hmar people, in the Dima Hasao district of Assam, particularly in villages such as Boro Muolkoi, Retzawl, Huonveng (Haflong), Huonveng (Harangajao) and neighbouring settlements. Smaller communities of speakers are also found in Cachar district of Assam, Manipur and Meghalaya.

Ṭhiek is an endangered Hmaric language with approximately 3,126 speakers recorded in a 2016 publication. Although the language continues to be transmitted within some villages, the increasing use of Standard Hmar (Khawsak Ṭawng), Mizo, Assamese and English has contributed to its gradual decline among younger generations.

Ṭhiek belongs to the Kuki–Chin branch of the Tibeto–Burman language family and forms part of the Hmaric subgroup, together with Hmar (Khawsak), Saihriem (Faihriem), Leiri and Duhlian varieties.

== Documentation ==
The Thiek language has been documented through field recordings, elicitation sessions, narratives, conversations, and photographs collected by linguist Marina L. Infimate in 2023-25. These materials are preserved in the Thiek Language Resource hosted by the UNT Digital Library and are also available through the Endangered Languages Archive (ELAR).

A collaborative documentation of Saihriem and Thiek: Two South-Central languages of the Cachar cluster was also undertaken under the Endangered Languages Documentation Programme in partnership with Indian Institute of Technology Delhi.

Thiek Clan (Thiek Pahnam)
Athu	Amaw (Amo)	Tuolor	Thilsong
Buhril	Hekte	Ralsun	Chawnghekte
Thluchung (TC)	Kungate	Selate	Tuolte
Ṭaite	Hnamte	Kangbur	Khawzawl
Lalum	Laldau	Saibung	Vankal
Pangote	Pangulte	Khawbuol	Pakhumate
Khumthur	Khumsen	Thlihran	Tamte
Hmante	Chawnnel	Zate	
