= Kharam Naga =

Kharam or Kharam Naga may refer to:

- Kharam people
- Kharam language
