= Saihriem =

Saihriem or Faihriem may refer to:

- Saihriem people
- Saihriem language
