= Moyon Naga =

Moyon Naga may refer to:

- Moyon Naga people
- Moyon Naga language
