= Koireng language =

Sino-Tibetan language spoken in India

Koireng
- Koren
- Native to: India
- Region: Manipur
- Ethnicity: Koireng people
- Native speakers: 1,900 (2011)
- Language family: Sino-Tibetan: Tibeto-Burman; Kuki-Chin-Naga; Kuki-Chin; Northwestern; Koireng

Language codes
- ISO 639-3: nkd
- Glottolog: koir1240
- ELP: Koireng

Koireng is a Kuki-Chin language, belonging to the Northwestern or "Old Kuki" subfamily, spoken by the Koireng (or Koren) community. The language shares lexical similarities with Aimol, Purum and Kharam languages. Its speakers are found mainly in Manipur and use Meitei language as their second language (L2).
