= Lamkang Naga =

Lamkang Naga may refer to:

- Lamkang Naga people (Lamkang Nagas) - Lamkang people
- Lamkang Naga language - Lamkang language
