= Khoibu =

Khoibu may refer to:

- Khoibu people, an ethnic group of north-east India
- Khoibu language, the Sino-Tibetan language they speak
