= Maphou =

Maphou (Lenghou Kho)
- village
- Location in Manipur, India
- Coordinates: 24.818°N 94.140°E
- Country: India
- State: Manipur
- District: Kangpokpi

Population (2001)
  - Total: 471

Languages
  - Official: Meiteilon (Manipuri)
- Time zone: UTC+5:30 (IST)
- Vehicle registration: MN
- Nearest city: Imphal
- Lok Sabha constituency: Saikul
- Vidhan Sabha constituency: Saikul

Maphou Kuki Village
Total population
- 471 (2001 census)

Regions with significant populations

Languages
- Kuki, Hangmi/Milhiem Kuki, Manipuri, English

Religion
- Christianity, Baptist

Related ethnic groups
- Other Chin-Kuki

Maphou is a village in the Saikul subdivision of the Kangpokpi district in Manipur, India. Most residents are members of the Kuki ethnic group.

== Location ==
Maphou is located in the Tomching Chingsang Hills range and is situated on the bank of the Thoubal River. It is located 36 kilometres (22 mi) from the city of Imphal. It is surrounded by villages belonging to the Tangkhul tribe.

== History ==
Maphou was established before the independence of India, by the forefathers of Lenghou Lupho. In 1945 Lenghou Lupho converted to Christianity and founded the first Christian Church in 1945. The present village chief is Haokhomang Lupho( Ex-Chairman, Thoubal Area Kuki Inpi, the great-grandson of Lenghou Lupho. Chairman Thoubal multipurpose project committee.

== Church movement ==
As the village was established after the Lenghou family converted to Christianity, the Christian church was one of the first buildings in the village. The first church leader was Ngamkholhun Lupho. In the 1980s a second church was built. The two congregations were Newlife and Kuki Baptist Convention (KBC). After 1990 a single church was formed under the banner of the Maphou Local Baptist Church.

The golden jubilee of the church was in 1996 but the celebration was not held until 2000, due to the ethnic clashes that were occurring at that time. The theme of the jubilee celebration was a quotation from Mathew 16:18: "And I also say to you that you are Peter, and on this rock, I will build my church, and the gates of Hades shall not prevail against it."

== Ethnic origin of the villagers ==
The villagers belong to the Milhiem (also known as Milhem and Miriem) group of the Kuki ethnic group. According to the unpublished booklet Misao Inkon, Pu Shinghil. Pa Minluto, their progenitor, Hangmi, is the son of Vumchom. The terms Milhiem, Mirem, Meriem, Miria, and Milhem are synonymous with Hangmi. Their language is a member of the Kukish branch of the Tibeto-Burman language family, with whom they share history, culture and traditions. Recently, some concerns were raised regarding the ability of citizens of Maphou to preserve their identity and culture if intertribal marriages are allowed with the neighboring Tangkhul tribe villages and Meitei community villages.

== Effects of ethnic clashes ==
The Kuki–Naga ethnic clash of the 1990s had a great impact on the village, with property damage, and some villagers losing their lives. Due to these ethnic clashes, there has been some migration of villagers to safer places.

Ngamjapoa Lupho (Ex-Chairman Thoubal Area Kuki Inpi, Ex-president Kuki Baptist Convention) was killed in the ethnic violence by militant members of the National Socialist Council of Nagaland (NSCN IM) in 1998. He was a prominent chief who was the seventh son of the founder of the village. He was killed by an ambush while on his way to Imphal in his jeep along with six other villagers.

== Government and other institutions ==
Maphou Village Authority is the group in charge of local government. The village chief is the chairman of the village authority.

Maphou Local Baptist church is active in town. Maphou Youth Development Organisation (MYDO) and the Nisha Band (a women's organisation) help improve village life.

There is a primary health centre (Maphou PHC). The Maphou UJB school is run in a partnership between the village authority and the Government. The village is home to the Angawadi Centre. New Maphou Kuki Sewing Training Centre.

=== Maphou Dam ===
The Thoubal Multipurpose Project, Maphou Dam is located in the village. This is a project intended to generate electricity and to supply water for irrigation and drinking, and is expected to be completed by 2011. The work on the Earth Dam is being carried out by the Hyderabad-based Progressive Company while the work on the spillway is the responsibility of Ansal Properties and Infrastructure Limited, New Delhi.

The proposed height of the dam is 66 feet and 107.4 metre long and has the projected capacity to generate 7.5 Megawatts of power with three components each generating 2.5 Megawatts.

Apart from supplying 10 million gallons of water per day, the dam will have the capacity to irrigate 33,449 hectares of arable land in a year. Work on the project started in 1980.

=== Irrigation and Flood Control Department (IFCD) ===
Office of Irrigation and Flood Control Department (IFCD) and a quarter is situated in Maphou village.

=== Maphou Police outpost ===
A Police outpost has been set up. Along with the Border Security Force, the Indian Reserve Battalion, and Assam Rifle are among the securities present in the Village.
