= Maring language (India) =

Sino-Tibetan languages of Manipur, India

Maring
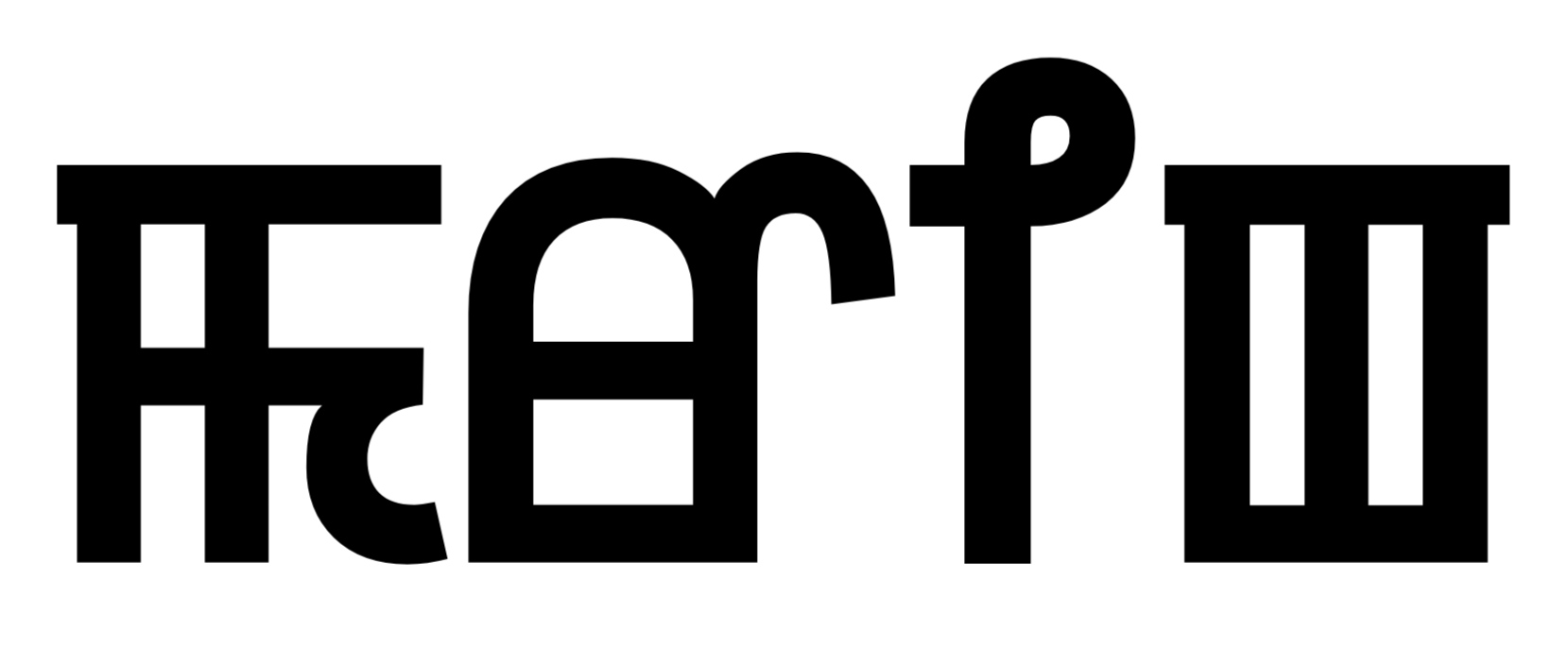
- Maring written in Meitei script
- Region: Manipur
- Ethnicity: Maring
- Native speakers: 26,000 (2011 census)
- Language family: Sino-Tibetan: Tibeto-Burman; Central Tibeto-Burman (?); Kuki-Chin–Naga; Tangkhul–Maring; Maringic; Maring
- Writing system: Meitei script

Language codes
- ISO 639-3: nng
- Glottolog: mari1416

Maring is a Sino-Tibetan language spoken by the Maring people in Manipur, India. Linguistically, it is closest to the Uipo language (Khoibu) and the Tangkhulic languages.

Maring is spoken in Laiching in southeast Chandel district and the northern border regions of the Tengnoupal district. (Ethnologue).

== Phonology ==
Consonants
	Labial	Alveolar	Palatal	Velar	Glottal
Plosive	p b	t d	tʃ dʒ	k	
Aspirated	pʰ	tʰ		kʰ	
Fricative	f	s			h
Nasal	m	n		ŋ	
Approximant	w	l r	j		

Vowels
	Front	Central	Back
High	i		u
Mid	e		o
Low		a	

Additionally, the following diphthongs have been observed: /ei/, /ai/, /au/, /ui/, /oi/.
