= PUZ =

PUZ or puz may refer to:

- Puerto Cabezas Airport (IATA: PUZ), an airport in Puerto Cabezas, Nicaragua
- Purum language (ISO 639-3: puz), a Southern Naga language of India
