= Tarao Naga =

Tarao Naga may refer to:

- Tarao Naga people
- Tarao Naga language
