= Ranglong language =

Sino-Tibetan language of India

Ranglong
- Langrong, Rangkhol
- Native to: India, Bangladesh
- Region: Tripura (North Tripura, Dhalai), Assam (Karimganj (now Shribhumi), Cachar, Hailakandi), Mizoram
- Ethnicity: Halam (Ranglong tribe)
- Native speakers: ~8,000 (2011 est.)
- Language family: Sino-Tibetan: Tibeto-Burman; Kuki-Chin; Northwestern; Ranglong
- Writing system: Latin

Language codes
- ISO 639-3: rnl
- Glottolog: rang1271

Ranglong or Langrong is a Kuki-Chin language, belonging to the Northwestern or "Old Kuki" subfamily, spoken by the Ranglong people. The Ranglong live in the border areas of Tripura, Assam and Mizoram. Glottolog classifies the language as a dialect of the Halam language.
