= Maringic languages =

Sino-Tibetan languages of Manipur, India

Maringic
- Geographic distribution: Manipur, India
- Linguistic classification: Sino-Tibetan: Central Tibeto-Burman?; Kuki-Chin–Naga?; Naga?; Tangkhul–Maring; Maringic
- Subdivisions: Maring; Uipo

Language codes
- Glottolog: mari1415
- ELP: Maring Naga

A Khoibu speaker recorded in India.

The Maringic languages is a small group of Sino-Tibetan languages consisting of Maring and Uipo (exonym: Khoibu), two closely related languages spoken by the Maring and Khoibu people in Manipur, India. Linguistically, they may be closest to the Tangkhulic languages.
