= Boro Muolkoi =

Village in Dima Hasao district, Assam, India

Boro Muolkoi Boro Mulkoi (Misspelt)
- Village
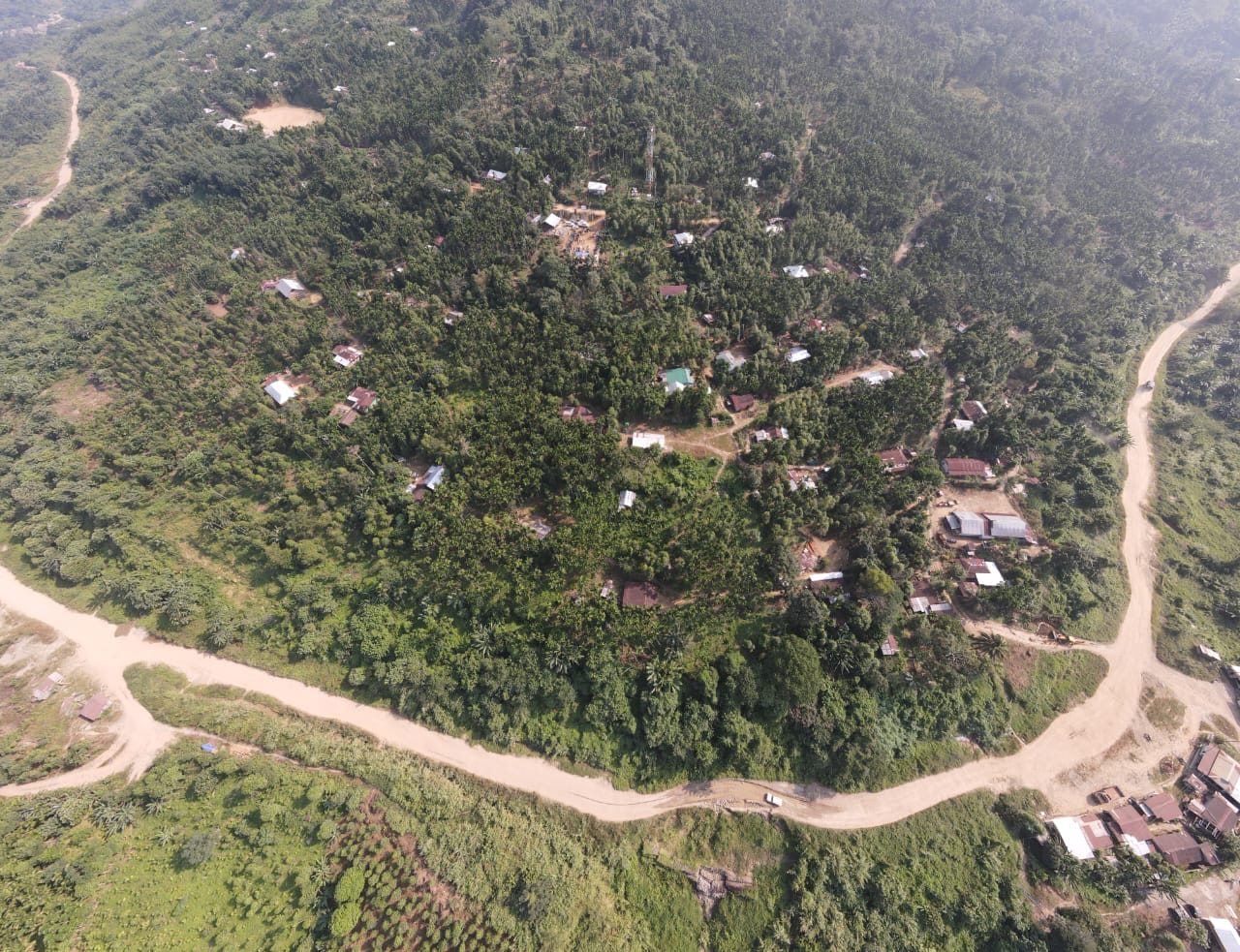
- Boro Muolkoi Aerial View

- Location within Assam Location within India
- Coordinates: 25.10952°N 92.89690°E
- Country: India
- State: Assam
- District: Dima Hasao
- Established: 1917
- Founder: Rohauvung Parate & Alien Bapui

Government
  - Type: Headman/Chief
  - Body: Boro Muolkoi Village Authority

Area
  - Total: 11.05 km^{2} (4.27 sq mi)

Population (2011 Census of India)
  - Total: 519
  - Density: 47.0/km^{2} (122/sq mi)

Languages
  - Locally Spoken: Thiek language & Hmar language
- Time zone: UTC+5:30 (IST)
- PIN: 788818
- ISO 3166 code: IN-AS
- Vehicle registration: AS 08-X XXXX

Boro Muolkoi, also known as Boro Mulkoi, is a Hmar village in Dima Hasao,

located in the Haflong subdivision of Dima Hasao district, in the state of Assam, India. It was established in 1917. Boro Muolkoi has the postal PIN code 788818.

== Etymology ==
The name Boro Muolkoi is a blend of words from Bangla and Hmar:

- Boro means big in Bangla,
- Muol means hills in Hmar,
- Koi (or Kawi) means zigzag in Hmar.

Thus, the name can be interpreted as "Big Zigzag Hills".

== History ==
Boro Muolkoi traces its origin to Phunchawngzawl (Muolkoi), a settlement established in 1917 by Alien Bapui and Rohauvung Parate. Phunchawngzawl (Muolkoi) became an early centre of Christianity in the region, where the first local Christian conversions were recorded in 1921 who were Roneilien Parate and Sumhauhrawng Parate. Following an influenza epidemic, the residents relocated and permanently settled at Muolkoi (Zopui) in 1923 under the leadership of Rochawnghlun Parate. After further relocations, Boro Muolkoi was established in 1927. Leadership later passed to Roneikhup Parate after Rochawnghlun Parate became ill. In 1958, a nearby Khasi (Pnar) settlement became known as Chhoto Muolkoi, and the two villages have since maintained close social and traditional ties.

== Demographics ==
Boro Muolkoi is a village in Dima Hasao district, Assam, with a total population of 519 residents living in 102 households, a sex ratio of 958 females per 1,000 males, a literacy rate of 96.84%, and 78.61% of the population belonging to Scheduled Tribes.

== Administration ==
Boro Muolkoi is governed by a traditional headman system led by a Gaon Bura which means Lal (Chief) and supported by a Village Cabinet. It falls under the North Cachar Hills Autonomous Council (NCHAC).

== Education ==
Boro Muolkoi has two educational institutions: Boro Muolkoi M.E. School (Estd. 1988), which provides upper primary education and Boro Muolkoi J.B. L.P. School (Estd. 1952, which provides lower primary education. Boro Muolkoi M.E. School is the designated polling station for the village.

== See also ==
- Haflong
- Dima Hasao
