= Korbong =

Subtribe of Halam community of Tripura, India

The Korbong are one of the sub-tribes of Halam community of Tripura, India.

As of 2016, there are a total of 31 families with 122 people in the subtribe. The model village of Korbongpara, whose foundation was laid in 2016 Tripura's Jirania town, is intended for the Korbong community.

== Variants ==
Variant spellings of the name include Korbong, Korbang, Karbang, Karbong or Korbwng.

== See also ==
- Debbarma
- Jamatia
