= Monsang people =

Tibeto-Burman ethno-linguistic group native to the state of Manipur, India

Monsang
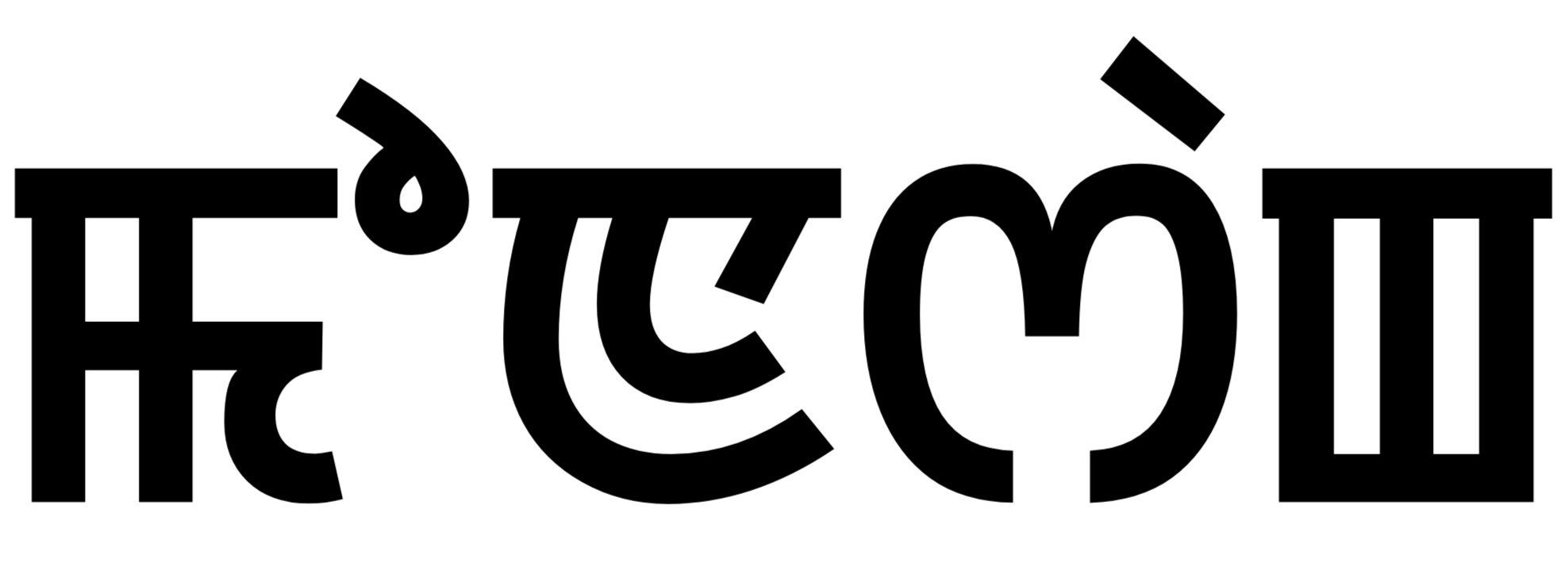
- "Monsang" written in Meitei script

Total population
- 2,427

Languages
- Monsang language (L1); Meitei language (L2)

Religion
- Christianity

Related ethnic groups
- Meitei people, Moyon people, Naga people

The Monsang people, also known as the Monsang Naga, are a Tibeto-Burman ethno-linguistic group native to the Northeast Indian state of Manipur. They use Meitei language as their second language (L2) according to the Ethnologue.

== Religion ==
Religion among Monsang
| Religion | Percent |
| Hinduism | 0.00% |
| Christianity | 100.00% |
| Others | 0.00% |
