= Monsang language =

Sino-Tibetan language spoken in India

Monsang
- Siirti
- Native to: India
- Region: Manipur
- Ethnicity: Monsang people
- Native speakers: 2,000 (2015)
- Language family: Sino-Tibetan: Tibeto-Burman; Kuki-Chin–Naga; Kuki-Chin; Northwestern; Monsang

Language codes
- ISO 639-3: nmh
- Glottolog: mons1234

Monsang (Monsang, Monshang; autonym: Si:rti) is a Kuki-Chin language, belonging to the Northwestern or "Old Kuki" subfamily, spoken in the Northeast of India. The speakers of this language use Meitei language as their second language (L2) according to the Ethnologue.

== Distribution ==
Monsang is spoken in Chandel subdivision, Chandel district, Manipur, in the 6 villages of Liwachangning, Changnhe, Liwa Khullen (Meeleen), Liwa Sarei, Japhou, and Monsang Pantha (Pentha Khuwpuw).

== Phonology ==
Unlike the more conservative Kuki-Chin languages spoken to the south such as Mizo, Monsang has many innovative phonological and morphological features.
