= Aimol people =

Aimol
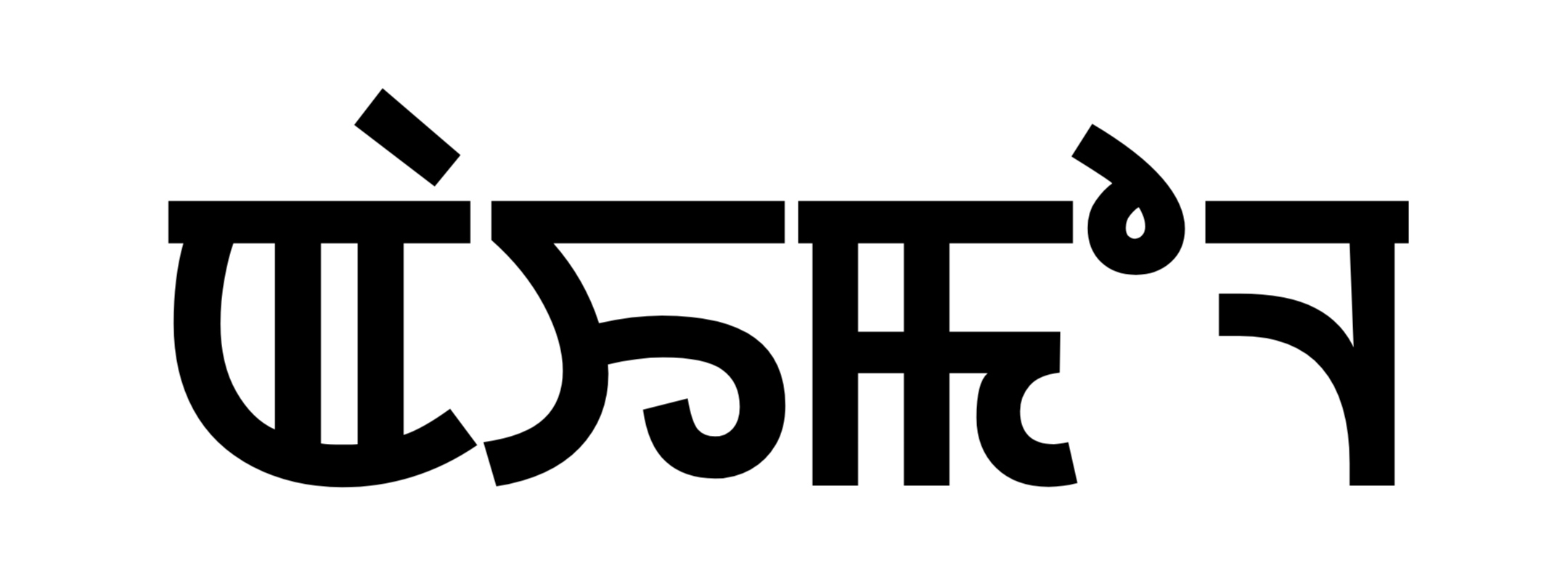
- The term "Aimol written in Manipuri script (Meitei script)

Regions with significant populations
- India (Manipur)

Languages
- Aimol language (L1); Meitei language (L2)

Religion
- Christianity

Related ethnic groups
- Meitei people, other Koren (Koireng), Chiru, Kharam, Kom, Chothe, Tarao

The Aimol people are an ethnic group living mainly in Manipur and in parts of Mizoram, Tripura, Nagaland and Assam, Meghalaya in India. They speak Aimol, a Sino-Tibetan language. Aimols use Meitei as their second language according to the Ethnologue. The Aimol people are settled in Chandel district and Churachandpur district in Manipur.

They practice slash-and-burn agriculture and are primarily Christian.

== History ==
The Aimol are thought to have originated from Mizoram and Tripura. They were originally mentioned in 1723. The earliest traditional settlement of the Aimol is known as Meetingbung-Satingbung, meaning a place where mankind and wild beasts lived together. It is argued that the Aimol arrived from the hills of wild tumeric in Aizawl in terms of clear oral history. They had settled there until the Mizo tribes forced them north. The Aimol are thought to have moved towards the Kabaw Valley where confrontation with the Shans encouraged them to settle at the Yomadang Hills called "Sibong-Khudengthabi".

== Clans ==
The indigenous term for clan in Aimol is phung. The Aimol people are subdivided into several clans: Chaithu, Chongom (with 2 sub-clans), Darkhum, Khochung, Lanu (with 1 sub-clan), Laita (with 2 sub-clans), Shialloa, Shongthu, Sairol, Samte, Tuiralreng, Thirchung and Ruijong.

== Religion ==
Historically the Aimol were animists they worshipped in gods such as Kho-pathian (village deity) and In-pathian (house deity), Sailing and Bonglei who were village protectors, Chahou god of agriculture and paddies, Miso god of peace and prosperity, and Arkun a goddess of fertility.

In the mid-20th century the Aimol were converted to christianity by Christian missionaries.

== Sources ==
- Lisam, Khomdam Singh (2011). Encyclopaedia of Manipur. Gyan Publishing House.
- Moyon, Koningthung Ngoru (2023). The Lost Kingdom of Moyon (Bujuur). Shashwat Publication.
