= Kharam people =

Ethnic group in Manipur, India

Kharam Naga
Total population
- 1,145

Languages
- Kharam (L1); Meitei language (L2)

Religion
- predominately Christianity

Related ethnic groups
- Meitei people, Inpui, Purum

The Kharam people, also known as the Kharam Nagas, inhabit the Northeast Indian state of Manipur. They are recognised as a Scheduled Tribe (STs) by India. They use Meitei language as their second language (L2) according to the Ethnologue.

== Etymology ==
The word Kharam is believed to have derived from the words khwa ram which is translated as "That land". According to another definition, the word Kharam is a compound word of kha (south) and ram (land or place) which literally means ‘Southland’.

== Demographics ==
The speakers of Kharam are mainly found in Kangpokpi district of Manipur and their language belongs to the Tibeto-Burman family. The Kharam dialect is mainly spoken in Tuisenphai, Laikot Kharam, Laikot Phaijol, Tampak Kharam, New Keithel Manbi and Kharam Khullen villages in Kangpokpi district.

Kharam has close affinities with other languages such as Kom, Koren, Purum, Aimol etc. The Kharams today are inhabited in the seven villages of Manipur of which the Kharam Pallen village is the oldest and largest village of Kharam people. Kangpokpi District.
