= Khelma, Peren =

Khelma
- village
- Location Nagaland, India Khelma (India)
- Coordinates: 25.393433°N 93.487338°E
- Country: India
- State: Nagaland
- District: Peren
- Circle: Kebai Khelma

Population (2011)
  - Total: 418
- Time zone: UTC+5:30 (IST)
- Area code: 25°27'30"N 93°25'21"E
- Census code: 268358

Khelma is a village in Peren district of Nagaland, India. It is located in the Khelma Circle.

== Demographics ==
According to the 2011 census of India, Khelma has 100 households. The effective literacy rate (i.e. the literacy rate of population excluding children aged 6 and below) is 62.42%.

Demographics (2011 Census)
	Total	Male	Female
Population	418	220	198
Children aged below 6 years	96	47	49
Scheduled caste	0	0	0
Scheduled tribe	418	220	198
Literates	201	126	75
Workers (all)	293	158	135
Main workers (total)	92	74	18
Main workers: Cultivators	45	40	5
Main workers: Agricultural labourers	38	26	12
Main workers: Household industry workers	1	1	0
Main workers: Other	8	7	1
Marginal workers (total)	201	84	117
Marginal workers: Cultivators	54	30	24
Marginal workers: Agricultural labourers	97	39	58
Marginal workers: Household industry workers	2	1	1
Marginal workers: Others	48	14	34
Non-workers	125	62	63
