= Chiru people =

Zo ethnic group found in northeast India

Chiru Chiru people
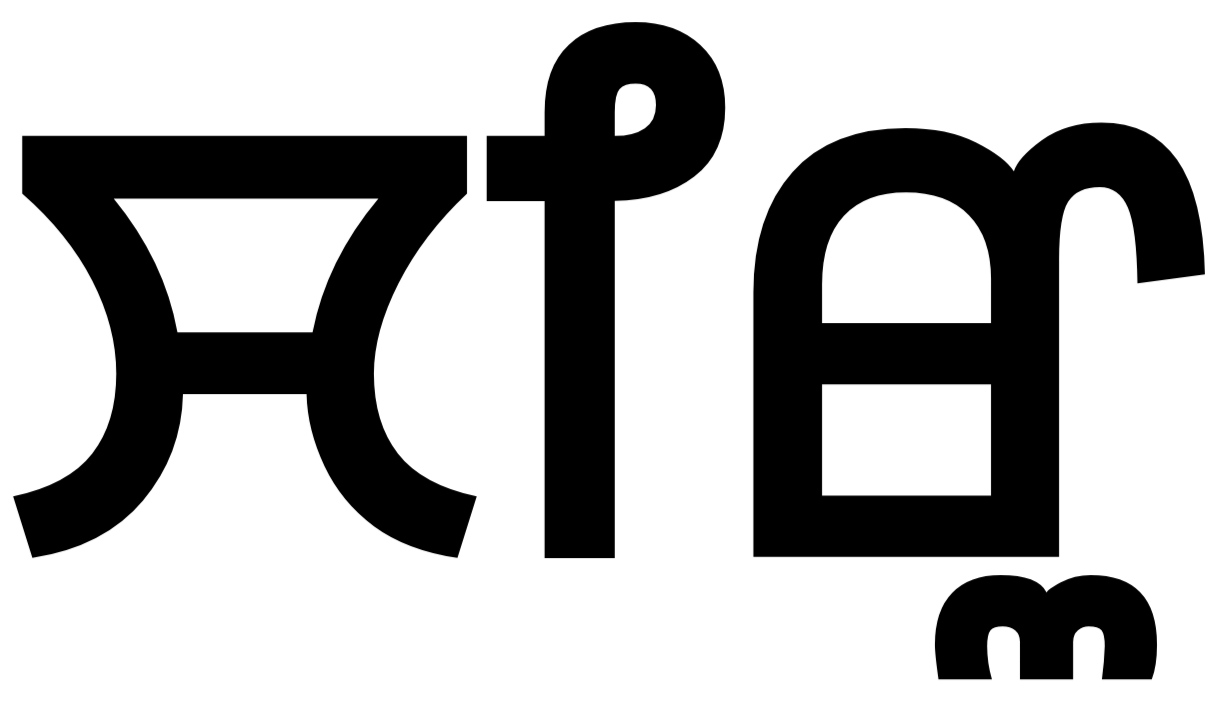
- Chiru written in Manipuri script (Meitei script)

Total population
- 8,599 approx, Manipur

Languages
- Chiru language (L1); Meitei language (L2)

Religion
- Christianity

Related ethnic groups
- Meitei people, Chin-Kuki-Mizo people, Hmars, Naga people

The Chiru people are a Naga ethnic group belonging to an ancestral kindred of the Rem Naga family or kinship of five tribes (Aimol, Kharam, Purum, Chiru, Koren) in the context of the Kangleipak Kingdom (Manipur Hills).

They are listed as a Scheduled Tribe, in accordance with the Scheduled Castes and Scheduled Tribes Orders Act 1950 of the Indian Constitution.

== Ethnonym and kinship ==
The five tribes of Aimol Naga, Chiru Naga, Kharam Naga, Purum Naga, Koireng Naga remain distinctively a family under Rem kinship and nomenclature.

This Rem (alternative spellings: Reem, Hriem, Riem) kinship precedes any other identity until in the 18th century, when the British brought the expression Naga into mainstream usage. The Chiru Rem Naga tribe mostly reside in Manipur and parts of Assam, India.

The term Chiru Rem emphasizes the Rem identity as used by the Chiru Rem Baptist Churches Association (CRBCA). In that context, it does not include the other fellow Rem tribe's Churches. The kindred term "Rem" never applied to the Thadou-Zo-Chin tribes.

== History ==
Their status quo as an indigenous Naga tribe of Manipur was recorded by the Royal Chronicles of Manipur or Cheitharol Kumbaba as early as the 11th Century AD. Earliest official records of the Manipuri King Loiyamba (1074-1122 AD)

In the 18–19th century, western anthropologists, researchers, and writers gained limited access to the Chiru Rem tribes. Photographic and limited research conducted by Ursula Graham Bower, J.P Hutton, T.C. Hodson and J. Shakespear, are the only corroborative evidence of their ancient way of life and existence, social, cultural and traditional set-up.

Most recent research of the 20th century by professor Gangmumei Kabui, a Rongmei Naga historian and scholar, utilised academic liberty and research hypothesis identifying the Chiru Tribe as buffer tribes between the migratory history of the Nagas & Kukis, thereby substantiating the chronology of the term Old Kuki-Chin-Zo-Burmese linguistic belt.

Since the early 21st century, the Chiru Union, North-East India (formerly the Chiru Tribal Union) has promoted research into the history and cultural origins of the Chiru people.

== Culture ==
All Chiru Naga customs, cultures, and traditions are in tandem with Naga tribes as a whole, starting from the tradition of Male Youth Dormitory (seer-inn) and short haircut (Saamren) and rokor vit (ear-piercing with increasing size of piercings until old age). The last of the elders with almost hanging earlobes with old metal coins, decorative, smaller animal horns as earrings, were seen until the end of the 20th century.

== Religion ==
The term lu-tu, or head severers/head hunters was completely denounced as a satanic or devilish cultural tradition after the early 20th century evangelization; early Christian leaders succeeded in complete eradication of its usage.

Rongmei Naga evangelists from Senpang Naga Baptist Church in Tamenglong District, baptised the first Christian converts as early as 1936 from Lamdangmei Chiru village (now Noney District).

== Language ==
The same Chiru Rem lingua franca (Rem Chawng), customs and traditions (Thoina-keina) are shared even with the Chirus of Assam (Budon Chirupunjee) despite centuries of separation.

They also use Meitei language as their second language (L2) according to the Ethnologue.

== Population ==
According to the 2011 census, the population of the Chiru tribe in Manipur was 8,599.
