= Chiru language =

Sino-Tibetan language spoken in India

Chiru
- Rem
- Rem
- Native to: India
- Region: Manipur
- Ethnicity: Chiru people
- Native speakers: 8,599 (2011)
- Language family: Sino-Tibetan: Tibeto-Burman; Kuki-Chin–Naga; Kuki-Chin; Northwestern; Chiru

Language codes
- ISO 639-3: cdf
- Glottolog: chir1283
- ELP: Chiru

Chiru is a Kuki-Chin language, belonging to the Northwestern or "Old Kuki" subfamily. spoken in Manipur and Assam. The Chiru population numbers approximately 8,599. It is an endangered language spoken in only three districts of India: Kangpokpi, Noney districts of Manipur and Cachar district of Assam. The speakers of this language use Meitei language as their second language (L2). The Chiru language is neither used in schools nor in radio or mass media. Older people read and write in Meitei language. The younger generation of Chiru speakers prefers the Latin script.

== History ==
The Chirus are one of the earliest inhabitants of Manipur and Assam. Cheitharol Kumbaba, the Royal Chronicle of Manipur mentioned that King Meidingu Chalamba defeated the Chirus in 1554. This proves that the Chirus had settled in Manipur long before this period. It was also mentioned in the Royal Chronicles of Manipur that an incidence of Meitei King's incursion on Nungsai Chiru Village occurred on 22nd day of Wakching (December–January) 1729 during the reign of Maharaja Garibniwaz (Cheitharol Kumbaba: 1989:90). In spite of the considerably long period of their settlement in the two states (Manipur and Assam), the population of Chiru native speakers is shockingly very low. The growth rate of their population was extremely steady. This might be due to high mortality rate and low birth rate in the previous centuries.

The domain of language use for Chiru is very limited. The usage of Chiru by Chiru native speakers is specifically confined only at home domain and within the community among the native speakers. The language proficiency of Chiru native speakers ranges from bilingual to multilingual. The native speakers in Manipur have high proficiency in Meitei language (Manipuri language) and those in Assam have high proficiency in Hmar, Meitei language and Sylheti Bengali. Chiru speakers in Manipur generally speak Meitei language, Hindi or English while those of Assam speak Hmar, Sylheti Bengali, Meitei language or Hindi at the time of interaction with non-Chiru speakers. The Chiru native speakers in Manipur usually speak either Meitei language or Hindi in the market place, office etc. Moreover, they also speak Paior Thwhen they interact with, and speakers respectively. On the other hand, Chiru speakers of Assam speak Sylheti Bengali, Meitei language or Hmar in the market places, offices or anywhere outside home domain. It is painful to mention that Chiru of Assam has not been recognized by the government of Assam. They are rather recognized as Hmar. Chiru is neither used in schools nor in radio or mass media. Even the children normally become bilingual at the minimum age of 5 since they acquire the second language in schools.

== Geographical distribution ==
Chiru is spoken in the following locations of Northeast India (Ethnologue).

- Manipur
  - Tamenglong district: Lamdangmei and Dolang villages
  - Kangpokpi district: Kangchup, Thangzing, Sadu (Thangthilon), Bungte, Nungsai, Dolang Khunou, and Uran villages
  - Churachandpur district: Charoi Khullen village
  - Thoubal district: Waithou Chiru
  - Bishnupur district
- Assam: Budon Village, Cachar district (a village near Jiribam)
- Nagaland (scattered)

== Phonology ==
=== Consonants ===
Consonants
		Labial	Alveolar	Palatal	Velar	Glottal
Stop	Tenuis	p	t	c	k	ʔ
Stop	Aspirated	pʰ	tʰ		kʰ	
Stop	Voiced	b	d			
Nasal		m	n		ŋ	
Fricative	Voiceless		s			h
Fricative	Voiced	v	z			
Lateral			l			
Trill			r			

=== Vowels ===
Vowels
	Front	Central	Back
Close	i		u
Close-mid	e		o
Open-mid	ɛ	ə	ɔ
Open		a	

- /ə/ does not occur in the final position.
- All other vowels can occur in initial, medial, and final positions.
- Chiru also has six diphthongs: /ai̯/, /ei̯/, /ɛi̯/, /ɔi̯/, /oi̯/, and /ui̯/.
- /ɛi̯/ and /oi̯/ do not occur word-initially.

=== Tone ===
Chiru has two register tones: low and high.

== See also ==
- Meitei language
- Barman language
