= Saihriem language =

Sino-Tibetan language spoken in India

Saihriem
- Faihriem, Sairiam, Sairiem, Sairhem, Saihriam, Syriem, Sairang
- Saihriem/Syriem/Sairang
- Native to: India
- Region: Cachar District of Assam
- Ethnicity: Faihriem
- Native speakers: 500–700 (2011)
- Language family: Sino-Tibetan: (Tibeto-Burman); Kuki-Chin; Central; Saihriem

Language codes
- ISO 639-3: None (mis)
- Glottolog: syri1242

The Saihriem (Faihriem, Syriem) language is spoken by a mixture of the Saihriem/Faihriem people- a sub tribe of Hmar group of tribes of the Chin-Kuki-Mizo and other ethnically closely related people such as the Aimol, Kuki, Vaiphei, in four neighbouring villages (Noxatilla, Bagbahar, Balisor, Nagathol & Saihriemkhuo villages) around Dwarbond in Bojalenga Block of Cachar District, Assam.

It is critically endangered, with the people who still speak the language numbering a few hundreds only. It was recorded wrongly as Sairang in the Census of India, 1901 and there were mere 71 speakers of the language at that time. It belongs to the Kuki-Chin branch of the Tibeto-Burman family of languages.

== Basic vocabulary ==
| Saihriem language | English |
|---|---|
| Engame i hming? | What is your name? |
| Ke hming chu Lala a eh. | My name is Lala. |
| Ka lawm ie. | Thank You |
| I dam naw? | How are you? |
| Ka dam ie. | I am fine. |
| Tui | Water |
| Boruok | Air |
| Rilei | Soil |
| Nga | fish |
| Ar (sa) | chicken(meat) |
| Vawksa | pork |
| Sehrâtsa | beef |
| Kêlsa | mutton |
| Dailaw | lentils |
| Zingkar | Morning |
| Khawlawi | Evening |
| Sawngkawl | Shirt |
| Tatuom | pants |
| Hmarcha | chilli |
| Samatarai | Orange |
| Thinghnatui | Tea |
| Lungsiet taka tui mi pek ta. | Please give me water. |
| Lungsiet taka bu mi pek ta. | Please give me food (rice). |
| Lungsiet taka an mi pek ta. | Please give me curry (side dish) vegetable / meat. |
| Engame ka pek sik che? | What will I give you? |
| Engam? | What? |
| Engtika? | When? |
| Engasik? | Why? |
| Khawtiengam? | Where? |
| Engtinam? | How? |
| Imuttui. | Sleep well. (The equivalent of "Good Night".) |
| Engtinam Aizawl se ka ti? | How do I go to Aizawl? |
| Ma hi engza man ame? | What is the price of this? |
| Dam taka se rawh ou. | Safe journey |

=== Numbers ===
| 0 | Biel |
| 1 | Inkhat |
| 2 | Phahni |
| 3 | Inthum |
| 4 | Inli |
| 5 | Ringa |
| 6 | Kiruk |
| 7 | Sari |
| 8 | Kiriet |
| 9 | Kuo |
| 10 | Sawm |
| 20 | Sawmhni |
| 30 | Sawmthum |
| 40 | Sawmli |
| 50 | Sawmnga |
| 60 | Sawmruk |
| 70 | Somsari |
| 80 | Sawmriet |
| 90 | Sawmkuo |
| 100 | Zakhat |
| 200 | Zahni |
| 300 | Zathum |
| 400 | Zali |
| 500 | Zanga |
| 600 | Zaruk |
| 700 | Zasari |
| 800 | Zariet |
| 900 | Zakuo |
| 1000 | Sângkhat |
| 10000 | Sîngkhat |
| 100000 | Nuoikhat |
| 1000000 | Maktaduoi |
| 10000000 | Vaibelsie |
| 100000000 | Vaibelsietak |
| 1000000000 | Tlukledingawn |

=== Names of weeks ===
| Sl. No. | English | Saihriem |
|---|---|---|
| 1 | Sunday | Pathienni |
| 2 | Monday | Thawṭanni |
| 3 | Tuesday | Thawleni |
| 4 | Wednesday | Nilâini |
| 5 | Thursday | Ningani |
| 6 | Friday | Zirtawpni |
| 7 | Saturday | Inrinni |
