= Khoibu people =

Tribe of Manipur, India

Uipo
Languages
- Uipo

Religion
- Christianity, Animism

Khoibu is an exonym for the Uipo people and their language, also known as the Uipo Khoibu (/ˌuɪː pə͜ʊ ˈkʰɔɪ buː/), who are a tribe in Manipur, India.

== Other exonyms ==
The neighbouring Tangkhul people call them "Apo" whereas the Maring people call them "Uipowaa". They were called "Upong" in the Inthee (or "Ningthee" in Meiteilon and 'Chindwin' in English) basin civilization.

== Notified status of the tribe in India ==
With reference to the Ministry of States' letter No.D.4101-B-49, dated 28 April 1949, the Dewan of Manipur State, vide his letter No.2/AG/49/0695-96 dated 6 June 1949, gave the list Scheduled Tribes of Manipur mentioning 'Khoibu' at serial number 18 of the list for inclusion in the Draft Constitution of India. The latest recognition document is the one granted by Manipur Hill Area Committee, which is a statutory body under the Constitution of India, in its Resolution No.4(HAC) 2002 dated 28 October 2002, vide order Memo No.4/3/2002-LA (HAC), Imphal dated 11 November 2002. The Manipur Legislative Assembly Hill Area Committee (HAC), in the year 2002 and 2011, recommended the recognition of the Khoibus as a separate tribe to the authorities concerned.

In the year 2015, the GPRN recognised the Uipo (Khoibu) as a separate Naga tribe. The Uipo Maruo Koukartuo (UMK) appreciated the GPRN for standing for the rights of the minority by looking into the matter objectively and taking a very mature decision. "The decision of the GPRN in recognizing Uipo (Khoibu) as a separate Naga tribe is a reaffirmation that minorities have hope and there can be justice. It has reaffirmed the people in the RULE of LAW," the UMK observed.

== Settlements ==
Khoibu Khullen is the oldest and the first Khoibu settlement village in the eastern hills of Manipur bordering Myanmar. Despite their identity being ignored, suppressed and repressed by tribals and non-tribals, the Khoibu have been able to retain their identity so far.

== Rituals and festivals ==
Name of Ritual/Festival	Month/Day of the year
Khoibu New Year	Phairen 1 ahanba
Aitlaangthoy	
Mawldaamthoy	
Nawngyerkachier	
Khanaa ka-ud	
Chaa kabuthoy	
Yui Kasyem	Lamta 3 humnipanba
Rapal kasaa	Sajiphu 7 taretnipanba
Raallu kalaam	Sajiphu 8 nipannipanba
Yawn kashoy	Kaalen 1 nongmapanba
Chaasang kadaa	Kaalen 3 humnipanba
Khulpu Chaa Kousalaag	Kaalen 4 marinipanba
Chim kasaa	Kaalen 5 manganipanba
Intring kachier	Kaalen 6 taruknipanba
Phu kabaang	Inga 2 ninipanba
Ram kanam Kharu kashoy	Inga 29 kunmapan panba
Khawngrui karaan	Thawaan 13 taraahumdoinipanba
Chayun Kapen	Thawaan 14 taraamarini panba
Thawng koumaru	Thawaan 15 purnimaada
Phu kayaar	Thawaan 15 purnimaada
Kaapkathawd	Laangbanga Mera marakta
Khadunglam kalai	Mera 10 taraani panbada
Khalaampui kathoy	Mera 11 taramathoini panba
Khalaampui kathoypui	Mera 12 taraanithoini panbada
Khanod kathrai	
Koukanseng	Mera 12 taraanithoini panbada
Haichingbawng	Mera 15 taraamangaani panba
Tlaanglon kalai	Mera 17 tarataretni panbada
Tlungsyel kalaad	Mera 19 taramapanni panbada
Meirui kasaan	Wakching 1 nongma panbada
Chaataangthoy/ Mawl kasaam	Wakching 5 mangani panbada
Maiso Kayia	

== Uipo language ==
A Khoibu speaker, recorded in India.

Uipo (Khoibu) language is classified as a southern Tangkhulic language of the Tibeto-Burman family. It is spoken by approximately 2800 speakers in Manipur. With this low number of speakers, who are all at least bilingual with Manipuri, the language is endangered. Consequently, it is expected to be declared as an endangered language with the subsequent call for the protection of the cultural, linguistic and historical heritage. In 2020 community activist Mr. Mosyel Syelsaangthyel Khaling became the first Indian citizen to receive the Excellence in Community Linguistics Award of the Linguistic Society of America – the most prestigious award for linguistic activism in the world.

== Political tensions ==
The Uipo tribe is a highly endangered community of Manipur and in great need of social recognition and constitutional protection from the Government since their identity, traditions and cultures are endangered and today hanging on the brink of extinction. The equation of powers among the ethnic enclosures in hill areas of the state also matters while deciding who should be recognised as a tribe or ST. Even the state that has the authority to recognise tribes as schedule tribe is influenced by the strong lobby of a powerful tribe who is against the recognition of certain groups as ST.

The case study of Khoibus is important because it is a case of negotiating a distinct tribal identity between the ethnic enclosures in Manipur. It is argued that the enclosures of tribes around the generic ethnic identities like Naga have made the cultural identity of the Khoibus invisible. The study is also important in the sense that despite non-recognition of Khoibu as an official tribe, they live themselves as an independent tribe.
