= Moyon people =

Naga tribe in India and Myanmar

Moyon (Moyon Naga)
Total population
- 2,516 approx, Manipur

Languages
- Moyon language (L1); Meitei language (L2)

Religion
- Christianity

Related ethnic groups
- Meitei people, Monsang people, other Naga people

The Moyon people, also known as Bujuur people or the Moyon Naga, are a Tibeto-Burmese ethnic group predominantly residing in the Northeast Indian state of Manipur and Sagaing Region in Myanmar. Moyons share similar ancestry with Monsang Nagas, Moyon origins can be traced back to ancient times of Moirang Kingdom, as they were contemporary, the Moyon King "Kuurkam" also known as "Shamshangba Ningthou" (Long hair king) by Meiteis is well recorded in Meitei Chronicles. Kungjuur is an important Historical place for the Moyons. They are listed as a Scheduled Tribe (STs) by India. They use Meitei as their second language (L2) according to Ethnologue.
