= Tarao people =

Tribe of Manipur settled in Chandel district

Tarao
Total population
- 1066

Languages
- Tarao language (L1); Meitei language (L2)

Religion
- Christianity; Animism

Related ethnic groups
- Meiteis, Chothe, Anal, Lamkang, etc

The Taraos are one of the lesser-known tribes of Manipur mostly settled in Chandel district of Manipur. They use Meitei language as their second language (L2) according to the Ethnologue.
