= Sakachep language =

Language

Sakachep
- Khelma/Achep
- Region: India
- Ethnicity: Khelma (Sakachep)
- Native speakers: 25,000 (2003)
- Language family: Sino-Tibetan: Tibeto-Burman; Central Tibeto-Burman (?); Kuki-Chin-Naga; Kuki-Chin; Central; Hmar; Sakachep

Language codes
- ISO 639-3: sch
- Glottolog: saka1283

Sakachep also known as Khelma, is a Central Kuki-Chin-Mizo language of Northeast India. Dialects are Khelma, Achep, Mar-Achep (Marachepang), Thang Achep, and Sak Achep (Ethnologue). VanBik (2009) classifies Sakachep as closely related to Aimol, Anal, Chiru, Kharam, Koireng (Koren), Kom, Lamkang, Purum, Biate, Chorei, Ranglong, Molsom, Hrangkhol, Kaipeng, Bongcher and Thiek-Hmar.

== Geographical distribution ==
Ethnologue reports the following locations for Sakachep.

- Karbi Anglong district, Dima Hasao district (formerly North Cachar Hills district), and Cachar district of Assam
- Khelma village, Kohima district, Nagaland
- Saithsma, Rumphung, and Mongor villages of Jaintia Hills district, Meghalaya
- Tripura
- Mizoram
- Manipur
