= Moyon language =

Tibeto-Burman language spoken in India

Moyon
- Native to: India
- Region: Nagaland, Manipur
- Ethnicity: Moyon people
- Native speakers: (3,700 cited 2001)
- Language family: Sino-Tibetan: Tibeto-Burman; Kuki-Chin–Naga; Kuki-Chin; Northwestern; Moyon

Language codes
- ISO 639-3: nmo
- Glottolog: moyo1238

Moyon is a Kuki-Chin language, belonging to the Northwestern or "Old Kuki" subfamily, spoken by the Moyon people in Manipur, India and in Burma. The speakers of this language use Meitei language as their second language (L2) according to the Ethnologue.

A Quadrilingual Moyon-Manipuri-English-Nagamese book titled "A Guide Book to Moyon Language", was published by the Moyon Literature Society in 2023.

== Geographical distribution ==
Moyon is spoken in the following locations (Ethnologue).

- Chandel district, Manipur: 14 villages including Moyon Khullen, Khongjom, Mitong, Komlathabi, Penaching, and Heigru Tampak
- Nagaland (near the Myanmar border)
