= Saihriem (clan) =

Tribe or Sub-tribe of the Hmar community

Faihriem (Faihriam, Sairang)
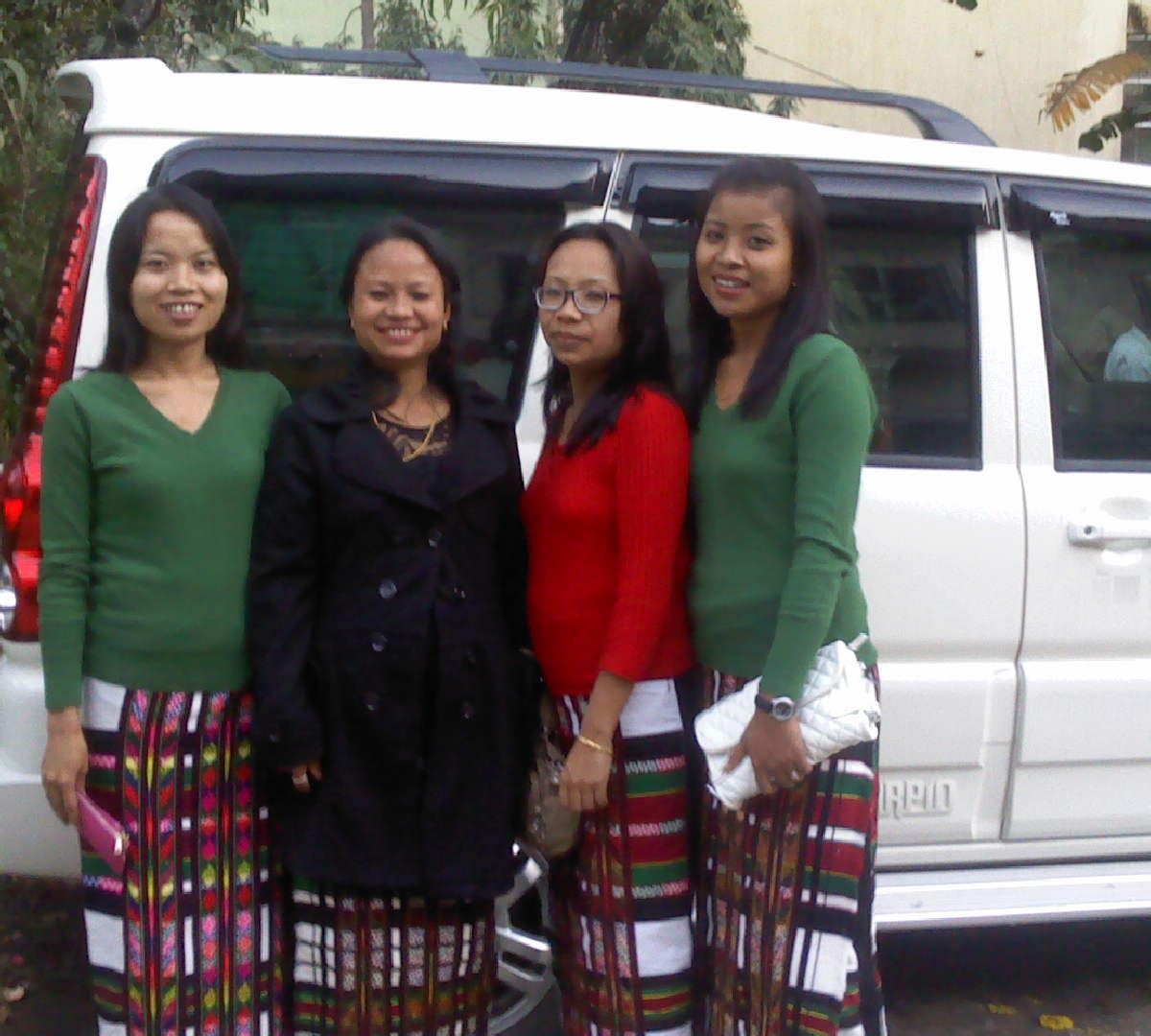
- Faihriem women

Regions with significant populations
- Northeast India (Assam · Mizoram · Manipur · Meghalaya · Tripura)

Languages
- Saihriem · Hmar · Mizo · Hindi · English

Religion
- Majority: Christianity; Minority: Islam

Related ethnic groups
- Hmar · Kuki · Mizo

The Faihriem, or Saihriem, are one of the clans of Hmar tribe.

== Bibliography ==
- B.C.Allen, B.A., ICS, Superintendent of Census Operations in Assam. Census of India, 1901. Volume IV. Assam. Part I. Report. Printed at the Assam Secretariat Printing Office, 1902.
- 1999, Robin D. Tribhuwan, Preeti R. Tribhuwan. Tribal Dances of India (Encyclopaedic profile of Indian tribes, volume 1). Page 117.
- Gazette of India Extraordinary No.40, New Delhi. Wednesday, 6 September 1950. S.R.O. 510.
