= Retzawl, Assam =

Village in Dima Hasao, Assam, India

Coordinates: 25.108°N 92.992°E

Retzawl (or Retzol) is a village in Dima Hasao District of Assam State, India. Haflong, the district headquarters as well as its nearest town, is 17 kilometers away to the east, and Harangajao lies to the west.

Retzawl is surrounded by the villages Jatinga to the east; Doiheng to the south; Jatinga Lampu to the west and Inchaikang to the north.

== History ==
Retzawl village is believed to be established in the 1780s. Its name is the word in a native language of the Hmars, meaning a plain where native rubber trees grow naturally.

Later many of the villagers decided to shift the village downhill in order to develop paddy fields. They had abandoned their original habitation/village which has now come to be called "Retzawl Khuoruo" or "Khuo-Malui" (abandoned Retzawl Village or former village, respectively) and settled down in three places namely, in the local dialect, "Sekhnuoipha" (formation of the land resembles with hammer); "Phai" (plain) and "phailammuol" (hills along the way towards the plain). These places are situated at 3 to 4 km away from the original village in a triangular manner (i.e. Sekhnuoipha, in the east; Phailammuol, in the west and Phai, in the north) and the distance between them maybe approximately 2 km each. At about this time a modern agricultural system began to be introduced at Retzawl in the places mentioned above, and the villagers had to settle there to take advantage of a composite scheme of government grants promoting the new system. The official name of the village remained the same since all three fall within the municipal boundaries of Retzawl Village.

After some years, those settled in the Phai had shifted to Phailammuol and later on to Sekhnuoipha. "Sekhnuoipha" has now calls as "Upper Retzawl" and "Phailammuol" as "Lower Retzawl".

In 2003 there were incidents of racial unrest in the area around the village.

In Retzawl, Hmar People Convention Democratic (HPC-D) designated camp was inaugurated. Hmar People's Convention- Democracy (HPC-D) is an offshoot of the Hmar People's Convention (HPC), which came into existence in 1986, as a political party spearheading a movement for self-government (i.e. Autonomous District Council) in the north and northeast of Mizoram.

== People ==
Most of the inhabitants are 'Thieks', a subtribe of the Hmars, whose ancestors had founded the village and have been ruled by the 'Tuolor clan' from amongst the 'Thieks' on hereditary, in the form of Khuolal or Hausa, meaning "Headman" or "Gaon Bura" at the head in the village administration, as the system has been in practice since time immemorial. The Thiek language is widely spoken. Retzawl is one of the villages served by the North Cahar Hills Hmar Cultural Organization.

== Infrastructure ==
There is a high school in the village known as Retzawl High School. It was established in 1996 under the president-ship of Late Thilhlun Thiek and Sri. Lalremsiem Thiek, as its founding Secretary cum Headmaster. With the duo ardent dedication to the establishment this school it could shape in a real form. Henceforth, many students of the village and nearby got an opportunity to continue their further studies after their Middle Standard School besides many have had passed out H S L C Examination through this school. After the demises of the President was succeeded by Sri.Dotho Hmar and the Headmaster was later succeeded by Mr. Lallienzuol Hmar and he was again succeeded by Mr. Lalsangzuol Tuolor.

There are also three lower Primary Schools and two ME Schools, namely Retzawl L P School. and Sekhnuoipha L P School. (government aided) and Gilgal Standard English School. LP as Private runs by Independent Church of India (ICI) local Church while Retzawl ME School] as government aided and Covenant English School. (ME) as private run by Reformed Presbyterian Church respectively.
