= Kuki-Chin languages =

Language family

Kuki-Chin
- Kuki-Chin-Mizo, Kukish, South Central Tibeto-Burman, South Central Trans-Himalayan
- Geographic distribution: India, Myanmar, Bangladesh
- Ethnicity: Zo: Kuki; Chin; Mizo; Zomi
- Linguistic classification: Sino-Tibetan: Central Tibeto-Burman?; Kuki-Chin–Naga?; Kuki-Chin
- Early form: Proto-Kuki-Chin
- Subdivisions: Northwestern; Northeastern; Central; Maraic; Southern; Khomic

Language codes
- Glottolog: kuki1246 Kuki-Chin

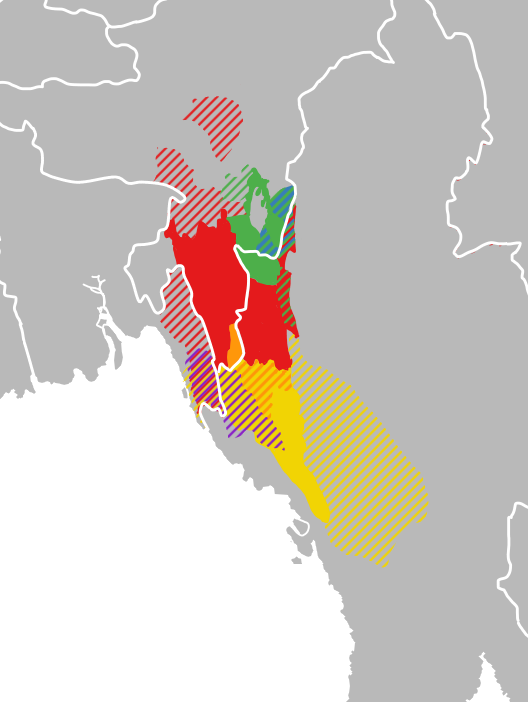
Blue: Old Kuki, Green: Kuki-Zo, Red: Central, Orange: Maraic, Yellow: Southern, Purple: Khomic

The Kuki-Chin languages (also called Kukish or South-Central Tibeto-Burman languages) are a branch of the Sino-Tibetan language family spoken in northeastern India, western Myanmar and southeastern Bangladesh. Most notable Kuki-Chin-speaking ethnic groups are referred to collectively as the Zo people which includes the Mizo, Kuki, Chin and Zomi people.

Kuki-Chin is alternatively called South-Central Trans-Himalayan (or South Central Tibeto-Burman) by Konnerth (2018) because the term "Kuki-Chin" carries negative connotations for many speakers of languages in this group.

Kuki-Chin is sometimes placed under Kuki-Chin–Naga, a geographical rather than linguistic grouping.

== Geographical distribution ==
- Northwestern ("Old Kuki"): Chandel district of Manipur, India; Tamu Township of Sagaing Region, Myanmar.
- Northeastern ("Kuki-Zo"): Chandel district, Churachandpur district, Kangpokpi district, Noney district, Tamenglong district, and Tengnoupal districts of Manipur, India; Tedim Township and Tonzang Township of Chin State, Myanmar; Tamu Township of Sagaing Region, Myanmar.
- Central: whole state of Mizoram, India; Pherzawl district of Manipur, India; parts of Cachar district and parts of Karbi Anglong district of Assam, India; parts of East Jaintia Hills district of Meghalaya, India; Falam Township, Hakha Township, and Thantlang Townships of Chin State, Myanmar; Kalay Township and Khampat area of Sagaing Region, Myanmar, parts of Chittagong Hill Tracts of Bangladesh.
- Maraic: majority of Siaha district of Mizoram, India; parts of Matupi Township of Chin State, Myanmar.
- Southern: Kanpetlet Township, Matupi Township, Mindat Township, Paletwa Townships of Chin State, Myanmar; parts of the Arakan Range of Rakhine State, Myanmar; parts of Chittagong Hill Tracts of Bangladesh.
- Khomic: Paletwa Township of Chin State, Myanmar; parts of Chittagong Hill Tracts of Bangladesh.

== Internal classification ==
The Karbi languages may be closely related to Kuki-Chin, but Thurgood (2003) and van Driem (2011) leave Karbi unclassified within Sino-Tibetan.

The Kuki-Chin branches listed below are from VanBik (2009), with the Northwestern branch added from Scott DeLancey, et al. (2015), and the Khomic branch (which has been split off from the Southern branch) from Peterson (2017).

- Kuki-Chin
  - Northeastern ("Northern"): Suantak-Vaiphei, Zo (Zou), Paite, Tedim, Thado (Kuki), Gangte, Simte, Vaiphei, Sizang, Ralte, Ngawn
  - Northwestern ("Old Kuki"): Monsang, Moyon, Lamkang, Aimol, Anal, Tarao, Koireng (Kolhreng), Chiru, Kom, Chothe, Purum, Kharam,
  - Central: Mizo (Duhlian), Bawm (Sunthla and Panghawi), Halam (Ranglong, Darlong, Hauhulh, Simpi, Hualngo, Chorei), Thor (Tawr), Hmar, Hrangkhol, Biate (Biete), Hakha (Lai/Pawi, Mi-E, Zokhua), Pangkhua, Saihriem, Laizo/Tlaisun, Khualsim, Zanniat, Zahau, Sim
  - Maraic: Mara (Tlosai {Siaha and Saikao}, Hawthai {Lyvaw, Sizo, and Lochei}, Hlaipao {Zyhno, Heima, and Lialai}), Zophei, Senthang, Zotung (Lungngo, Calthawn, Innmai), Lautu
  - Southern: Shö (Asho/Khyang, Chinbon), Thaiphum, Daai (Nitu), Mün, Yindu, Matu, Welaung (Rawngtu), Kaang, Laitu, Rungtu, Songlai, Sumtu
  - Khomic: Khumi (Khumi proper and Khumi Awa), Mro, Rengmitca, etc.

Darlong and Ranglong are unclassified Kuki-Chin languages.

The recently discovered Sorbung language may be mixed language that could classify as either a Kuki-Chin or Tangkhul language.

Anu-Hkongso speakers self-identify as ethnic Chin people, although their language is closely related to Mru rather than to Kuki-Chin languages. The Mruic languages constitute a separate Tibeto-Burman branch, and are not part of Kuki-Chin.

=== VanBik (2009) ===
Kenneth VanBik classified the Kuki-Chin languages based on shared sound changes (phonological innovations) from Proto-Kuki-Chin as follows.

- Kuki-Chin
  - Central: *k(ʰ)r-, *p(ʰ)r- > *t(ʰ)r-; *k(ʰ)l-, *p(ʰ)l- > *t(ʰ)l-; *y- > *z-
    - Pangkhua?
    - Lamtuk Thet: Lamtuk, Ruavan
    - Lai
      - Hakha: Hakha, Thantlang, Zokhua
      - Falam: Bawm, Bualkhaw, Laizo, Lente, Khualsim, Khuangli, Sim, Tlaisun, Zanniat
    - Mizo
      - Mizo: Fanai, Hualngo, Lushai, Khiangte
      - Hmar: Khosak, Thiek, Lawitlang, Khawbung, Darngawn, Lungtau, Leiri
  - Maraic: *kr- > *ts-; *-ʔ, *-r, *-l > -Ø; *-p, *-t, *-k > *-ʔ; *θ- > *s-
    - Mara
      - Tlosai
        - Saikao
        - Siaha
      - Hlaipao
        - Heima
        - Lialai
        - Vahapi/Zyhno
      - HawThai
        - Sizo
          - Ngaphepi
          - Sabyu
          - Chapi
        - Lyvaw
          - Lochei
          - Tisih
          - Phybyu
    - Lautu
      - Hnaro
      - Chawngthia
    - Zophei
      - Vytu
      - Sate/Awsa
    - Senthang
      - Khuapi
      - Surkhua
    - Zotung *h- > *f-; *kr- > *r-; *khl- > *kh-, *l-; *c(^{h})- > *t(^{h})-/*s-; *y- > *z-/*z(^{h})-; *w- > *v-
      - Calthawng
      - Innmai
      - Lungngo/Tinpa
  - Peripheral: *r- > *g-
    - Northern: *θ- > *ts-; *kl- > *tl-; *-r > *-k
      - Thado/Kuki, Tedim, Khuangsai, Paite Vuite, Chiru
      - Sizang, Guite, Vaiphei, Ralte,
    - Southern (Southern Plains): *-r > *-y
      - Khumi: Khomi, Wakung
      - Cho-Asho
        - Asho
        - Cho: Matu; Chinpon; Daai, Nghmoye, Ngmuun, Mkaang

=== Peterson (2017) ===
David A. Peterson's internal classification of the Kuki-Chin languages is as follows.

- Kuki-Chin
  - Northwestern ("Old Kuki"): Purum, Koireng, Monsang, etc.
  - Central
    - Core Central
    - Maraic
  - Peripheral
    - Northeastern ("Northern")
    - Khomic: Khami/Khumi, Mro-Khimi, Lemi, Rengmitca, etc.
    - Southern
      - Cho
      - Daai
      - Hyow/Asho

Peterson's Northeastern branch corresponds to VanBik's Northern branch, while Peterson's Northwestern corresponds to the Old Kuki branch of earlier classifications.

== See also ==
- Pau Cin Hau script
- Kuki-Chin Swadesh lists (Wiktionary)

== Bibliography ==
- van Driem, George (2001). Languages of the Himalayas: An Ethnolinguistic Handbook of the Greater Himalayan Region. Brill. ISBN 978-90-04-12062-4.
- Peterson, David A. (2017). "On Kuki-Chin subgrouping". In Ding, Picus Sizhi; Pelkey, Jamin (eds.). Sociohistorical linguistics in Southeast Asia: New horizons for Tibeto-Burman studies in honor of David Bradley. Leiden: Brill. pp. 189–209. doi:10.1163/9789004350519_012. ISBN 978-90-04-34983-4.
- VanBik, Kenneth (20 October 2009). Proto-Kuki-Chin: a reconstructed ancestor of the Kuki-Chin languages (PDF). Berkeley: University of California. ISBN 0-944613-47-0. Archived (PDF) from the original on 2 July 2013.
