= Chothe people =

Chothe
Total population
- 3,585 approx, Manipur

Languages
- Chothe language

Religion
- Christianity

Related ethnic groups
- Other Kuki people

The Chothe people is one of the Naga ethnic groups found in the state of Manipur, India. Some historians and anthropologists have erroneously recorded the Chothe as the Purum of India. Some Chothe are called Chawhte in Mizoram and they are part of Mizo in Mizoram. Chothe tribe are Old-Kukis. They are listed as a Scheduled Tribe, in accordance with The Scheduled Castes and Scheduled Tribes Orders (Amendment) Act, 1976 Indian Constitution.

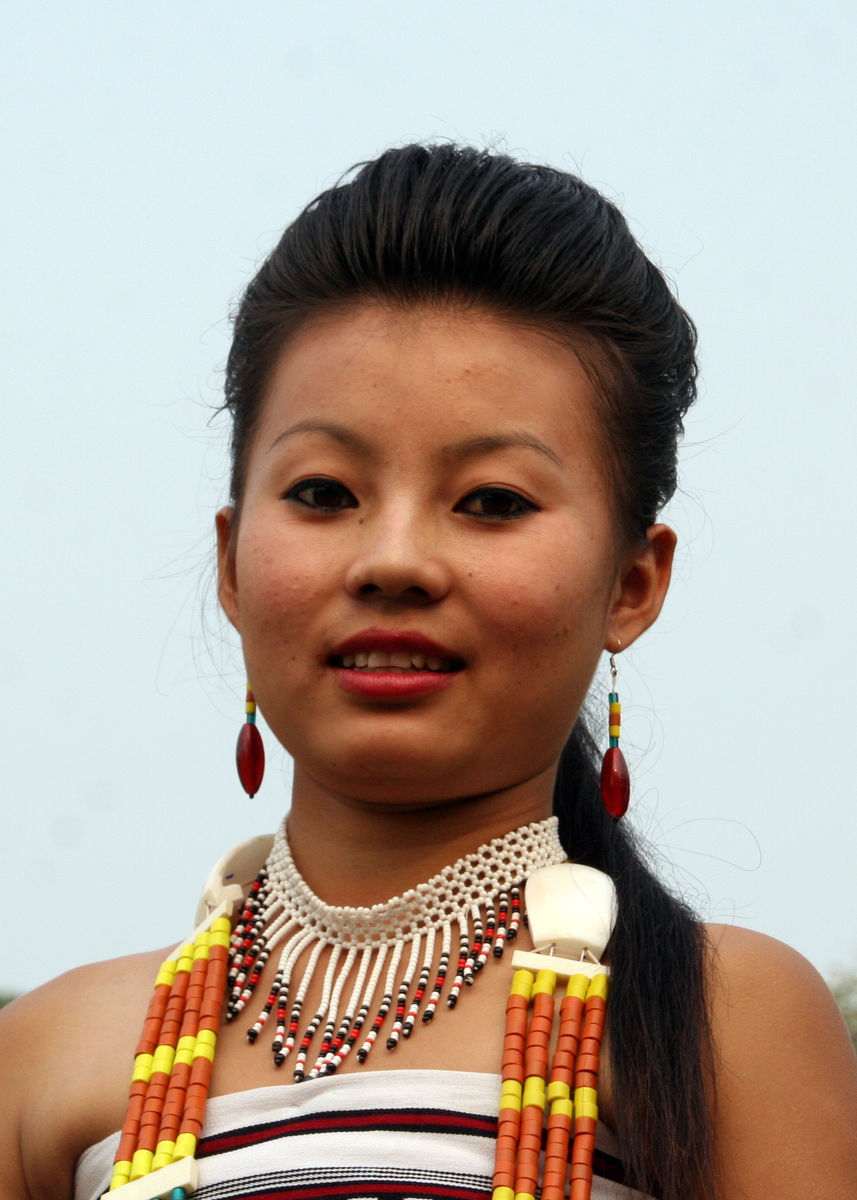
Chothe Tribal Girl

== Population ==
According to the 2011 census, the population of the Chothe tribe in Manipur was 3,585.
