= Chothe language =

Sino-Tibetan language spoken in India

Chothe
- Native to: India
- Region: Manipur, Nagaland
- Ethnicity: Chothe
- Native speakers: 3585 (2011)
- Language family: Sino-Tibetan: Tibeto-Burman; Kuki-Chin-Mizo; Kuki-Chin; Northwestern; Chothe

Language codes
- ISO 639-3: nct
- Glottolog: chot1239

Chothe (Chawte, Kyao) is a Kuki-Chin language, belonging to the Northwestern or "Old Kuki" subfamily. It may be intelligible with Aimol. The speakers of this language use Meitei language as their second language (L2) according to the Ethnologue.

== Geographical distribution ==
Chothe is spoken in the following locations (Ethnologue). The "purest" Chothe is reported to be spoken in Purum Khullen (Ethnologue).

- Southeastern Manipur
  - Chandel district (in 15 villages)
  - Bishnupur district (in Lamlang Hupi village)
- Nagaland (near the Myanmar border)
