= Chandel district =

- District of Manipur
- Location in Manipur
- Coordinates: 24.33°N 94°E
- Country: India
- State: Manipur
- Established: 13 May 1974
- Headquarters: Chandel

Area
  - Total: 2,100 km^{2} (810 sq mi)
  - Rank: 6

Population (2011)
  - Total: 85,072
  - Density: 40.51/km^{2} (104.9/sq mi)

Language(s)
  - Official: Meitei (Manipuri) (Note: Meitei language (officially known as Manipuri language) is the official language of Manipur. Other regional languages of different places in Manipur may either be predominantly spoken or not in their respective places but "Meitei" is always officially used.)
  - Regional: Thadou language and Anāl language
- Time zone: UTC+5:30 (IST)
- ISO 3166 code: IN-MN-BI
- Vehicle registration: MN
- Website: chandel.nic.in

Chandel district is one of the 16 districts of Manipur state in northeastern India. Its headquarters is the town of Chandel. In December 2016, a part of the district was split to establish the new Tengnoupal district. The district is mainly populated by Kuki-Zo and Old Kuki/Naga tribal people.

== History ==
2011 district map of Manipur; the Chandel district was divided into the present Chandel district and Tengnoupal district in 2016

In 1974, the Chandel district was formed under the name "Tengnoupal district". In 1983, the name was changed to Chandel district, as the district headquarters was located at Chandel. In December 2016, the present-day Tengnoupal district was split from the Chandel district.

== Economy ==
In 2006 the Ministry of Panchayati Raj named Chandel as one of the country's 250 most backward districts (out of a total of 640). It was then one of the three districts in Manipur receiving funds from the Backward Regions Grant Fund Programme (BRGF).

== Demographics ==
Religions in Chandel district (2011)
Religion	Percent
Christianity	93.20%
Hinduism	5.75%
Islam	0.66%
Other or not stated	0.39%

Historical population
Year	Pop.	±%
1951	24,049	—
1961	27,679	+15.1%
1971	38,723	+39.9%
1981	56,444	+45.8%
1991	71,014	+25.8%
2001	118,327	+66.6%
2011	144,182	+21.9%
2011 Chandel district (includes the present Tengnoupal district); Source: Census of India

According to the 2011 census, the undivided Chandel district hads a population of 144,182. This gives it a ranking of 602nd in India (out of a total of 640). The district has a population density of 43 inhabitants per square kilometre (110/sq mi). Its population growth rate over the decade 2001–2011 was 21.72%. Chandel has a sex ratio of 932 females for every 1000 males, and a literacy rate of 70.85%. The tribal composition of the district in 2011 is as below:

	Population	Percentage of Total Pop.
All Scheduled Tribes	128,280	89.0%
Kuki-Zo tribes (Note: The Kuki-Zo tribes include Gangte, Hmar, Paite, Simte, Sukte, Thadou, Vaiphei, Zou, and some smaller tribes designated as "Any Kuki" and "Any Lushai (Mizo)".)	59,910	41.6%
Naga tribes (Note: The Naga tribes include Angami, Kabui, Kacha Naga, Mao, Maram, Maring, Poumai, Sema and Tangkhul.)	24,270	18.9%
Old Kuki/Naga (Note: The Old Kuki tribes retaining the Kuki classification include: Aimol, Chiru, Kom, Koireng, Kharam, and Ralte. The tribes under the Naga umbrella include: Anal, Chothe, Koirao, Lamkang, Moyon, Monsang, Purum and Tarao.)	63,044	33.6%

Languages of Chandel district (2011)
1. Thadou 54,311 (37.7%)
2. Anal 25,843 (17.9%)
3. Maring 22,049 (15.3%)
4. Zou 4,878 (3.38%)
5. Hindi 4,204 (2.92%)
6. Ao 2,368 (1.64%)
7. Kom 1,711 (1.19%)
8. Others 28,818 (20.0%)

After the separation of Tengnoupal district 2016, the residual district has a population of 85,072, which is entirely rural. it has a sex ratio of 921 females per 1000 males. Scheduled Castes and Scheduled Tribes made up 0.09% and 92.56% of the population respectively.

=== Languages ===
The main languages in the district are Thadou (a "New Kuki" language), Anal (an "Old Kuki" language), Maring (a Naga language). Other Old kuki languages spoken include Lamkang, Moyon, Monsang, Chothe, Tarao, Khoibu, etc.

At the time of the 2011 census, 37.69% of the population spoke Thadou, 30.26% Anal, 4.74% Zou, 2.77% Ao, 2.26% Maring, 1.99% Hindi and 1.93% Kom as their first language. 12.05% of the population spoke languages classified as 'Others' on the census because they had fewer than 10,000 speakers in the country.

== Flora and fauna ==
In 1989, the Chandel district (which then included the Tengnoupal district) became home to the Yangoupokpi-Lokchao Wildlife Sanctuary, which has an area of 185 km^{2} (71.4 mi^{2}).

== Autonomous district council ==
At the district level there is the Chandel Autonomous District Council.

== See also ==
- List of populated places in Chandel district
