= Uipo language =

Sino-Tibetan language of Manipur, India

Uipo
- Khoibu
- Region: eastern Manipur
- Ethnicity: Uipo
- Native speakers: 2,000 (2024)
- Language family: Sino-Tibetan: Tibeto-Burman; Central Tibeto-Burman (?); Kuki-Chin–Naga; Tangkhul–Maring; Maringic; Uipo

Language codes
- ISO 639-3: nkb
- Glottolog: khoi1251

A Khoibu speaker recorded in India.

Uipo (also known by the exonym Khoibu) is a Sino-Tibetan language spoken by the Khoibu people in Manipur, India. It is related to the Tangkhulic languages. There are just under 2,000 speakers centered around the village of Kangshim in Manipur, located to the southeast of Imphal.

== Distribution ==
Uipo is spoken in Khoibu Khullen, Khangshim, Nungourok, Salemram, Yamolching, Thalem, Biyang, and Khadungyon in Chandel district and Thawai village in Ukhrul district.

== Community research ==
In 2020, the Uipo language activist Mosyel Syelsaangthyel Khaling became the first Indian citizen to receive the Excellence in Community Linguistics Award of the Linguistic Society of America.
