= Tarao language =

Sino-Tibetan language

Tarao
- Tarao Naga
- Taraotrong
- Native to: India
- Region: Manipur
- Ethnicity: Tarao people
- Native speakers: (870 cited 2000)
- Language family: Sino-Tibetan: Tibeto-Burman; Kuki-Chin; Northwestern Kuki-Chin; Tarao

Language codes
- ISO 639-3: tro
- Glottolog: tara1313
- ELP: Tarao Naga
- Torao is classified as Critically Endangered language by the UNESCO Atlas of the World's Languages in Danger

Tarao, Taraotrong or Tarau is a Kuki-Chin language, belonging to the Northwestern or "Old Kuki" subfamily. It is marginally (70%) intelligible with Chothe. The speakers of this language use Meitei language as their second language (L2) according to the Ethnologue.

== Locations ==
According to the Ethnologue, Tarao is spoken in Heikakpokpi, Leishokching, and Khuringmul Laiminei villages in the Palel area of Chandel district, Manipur, as well as in Sinakeithei village of Ukhrul district, Manipur.

Singh (2011:109) lists the Tarao villages as Tarao Khullen (Tarao Laimanai), Leishok Ching, Khuringmul, and Heikamul in Chandel District, Manipur. There are also about 8 families in Shajkeithel, Ukhrul District. The 2001 census reported a population of 870 Tarao people.
