= Lamkang language =

Sino-Tibetan language spoken in India and Myanmar

Lamkang
- Ksen
- Native to: India, Myanmar
- Region: Manipur
- Ethnicity: Lamkang people
- Native speakers: 9,000 in India (2011 census)
- Language family: Sino-Tibetan: Tibeto-Burman; Kuki-Chin–Naga; Kuki-Chin; Northwestern; Lamkang
- Writing system: Latin in India; Burmesee in Myanmar

Language codes
- ISO 639-3: lmk
- Glottolog: lamk1238
- ELP: Lamkang

Lamkang is a Kuki-Chin language, belonging to the Northwestern or "Old Kuki" subfamily. spoken by the Lamkang people of Manipur, India, with one village in Myanmar. It is very similar to Anal language, and has been influenced by Manipuri as the people have been acculturated.

== Geographical distribution ==
Lamkang is spoken in the following locations (Ethnologue).

- Chandel district, southwestern and southeastern Manipur
  - 7villages to the west and east of Sugunu, Keithelmanbi, Chayang, Purum Pantha, Leingangching, Nungkangching, Komsen, Kurnuching,
  - 7 villages between Chalong and Mombi New, Kongpe, Angbrasu, Challong, Paraolon, Lungkharlown, M.Seljol, Khuutun,
  - c. 20 villages between Pallel, Chandel town

Thamlakhuren, Lamrinkhuw, Aibuldam, Damjol, Thamlapokpi (Damloonkhuupii), Leipungtampak( RIndamkhuu), Laiktla, Ksen Khuupii, Lamkang Khunthak, New Lamkang Khunthak, Sektaikarong, Lamkang Khunou( Wangjangloon), Mantri Pantha, Ringkhuu, P.RaalRingkhuu, Angkhel Chayang, Deeringkhuu, Daampii, Khuutii, Charancghing Khunkha, Chanrangching khunou,

- Nagaland: Kohima and Dimapur-Lamkang Colony
