= Koireng people =

Indigenous people inhabiting Manipur, North-East India

Koren (Koireng)
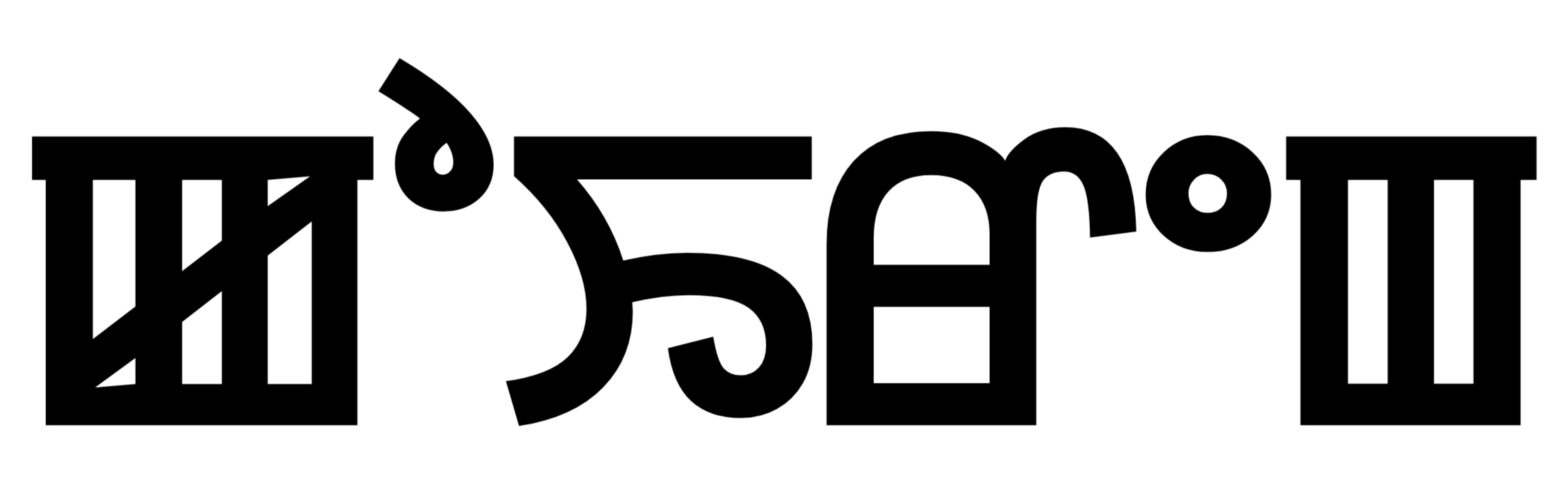
- "Koireng" written in Meitei script

Total population
- 1,873 (2011 census)

Regions with significant populations

Languages
- Koireng language (L1); Meitei language (L2)

Religion
- predominantly Christianity minority Hinduism · Islam

Related ethnic groups
- Mizo, Aimol, Kom, Ranglong

The Koireng people are one of the ethnic groups inhabiting Manipur in North-East India. The name “Koireng” translates to 'east men' derived from the Koireng dialect 'Kolren', Kol meaning East and Ren means People . They speak the Koireng language and are mentioned in the Meitei royal chronicle Cheitharol Kumbaba in the year 1404, one of the oldest tribes to be so mentioned. They have a shared common ancestry, history, cultural traits, folklore and dialects with their kindred people like Aimol and Kom. They use Meitei language as their second language (L2) according to the Ethnologue.

== Bibliography ==
- Shakespear, J. (1909) 'The Kuki–Lushai Clans.' The Journal of the Royal Anthropological Institute of Great Britain and Ireland. Vol. 39 (Jul., 1909), pp. 371–385
- https://web.archive.org/web/20131107225208/http://censusindia.gov.in/Tables_Published/SCST/ST%20Lists.pdf
- Shakespear, J. (1922) Tangkhul Folk Tales and Notes on Some Festivals of the Hill Tribes South of Assam. 14 pp.
- McCulloch/ Major W., 'Account of the valley of Munnipore and of the Hill Tribes'. Selections from the Records of the Government of India, No. 27 (Calcutta) 1859
- Grierson, G. A. (Ed.) (1904b). Tibeto-Burman Family: Specimens of the Kuki-Chin and Burma Groups, # Volume III Part III of Linguistic Survey of India. Office of the Superintendent of Government Printing, Calcutta.
- Ethnic Races of Manipur
