= Kharam language =

Sino-Tibetan language spoken in India

Kharam
- Native to: India
- Region: Manipur
- Ethnicity: Kharam people
- Native speakers: (1,400 cited 2000)
- Language family: Sino-Tibetan: Tibeto-Burman; Kuki-Chin–Naga; Kuki-Chin; Northwestern; Kharam

Language codes
- ISO 639-3: kfw
- Glottolog: khar1288 Kharam

Kharam is a Kuki-Chin language, belonging to the Northwestern or "Old Kuki" subfamily. According Ethnologue, Kharam shares a high degree of mutual intelligibility with Purum. The speakers of this language use Meitei language as their second language (L2) according to the Ethnologue.

== Geographical distribution ==
Kharam is spoken in the following locations of Manipur (Ethnologue).

- Kangpokpi district: Purum Likli, Purum Khulen, Purum Khunou, Waicheiphai, and Moibung Likli villages
- Chandel district: Lamlang Huipi, Chandanpokpi, Khongkhang Chothe, Loirang Talsi, Salemthar, Zat’lang, and New Wangparan villages
