= Northwestern Kuki-Chin languages =

Branch of Kuki-Chin-Naga languages

Northwestern Kuki-Chin
- Old Kuki
- Geographic distribution: Northeast India
- Ethnicity: Old Kukis and Nagas
- Linguistic classification: Sino-Tibetan: Tibeto-Burman; Central Tibeto-Burman (?); Kuki-Chin–Naga; Kuki-Chin; Northwestern Kuki-Chin

Language codes
- Glottolog: oldk1252

The Northwestern Kuki-Chin languages, originally called Old Kuki languages, is a branch of Kuki-Chin languages.

Most speakers identify as part of tribes traditionally grouped as Old Kukis, but some identify as Nagas. Andrew Hsiu (2019) also uses the label "Southern Naga" for Northwestern Kuki-Chin languages.

== Languages ==
Scott DeLancey et al. (2015) and Graham Thurgood (2016) list the following languages as Northwestern Kuki-Chin.

- Aimol
- Anal
- Chiru
- Chothe
- Kharam
- Koireng
- Kom
- Lamkang
- Monsang
- Moyon
- Purum
- Sorbung
- Tarao

== Bibliography ==
- DeLancey, Scott (ed) Panel session: Tibeto-Burman Languages of the Indo-Myanmar borderland. Lancaster University, 2015.
- Peterson, David. 2017. "On Kuki-Chin subgrouping." In Picus Sizhi Ding and Jamin Pelkey, eds. Sociohistorical linguistics in Southeast Asia: New horizons for Tibeto-Burman studies in honor of David Bradley, 189-209. Leiden: Brill.
- Rüfenacht, Sara. 2025. A first look at reconstructing Proto-Northwestern (South Central). 58th International Conference on Sino-Tibetan Languages and Linguistics (ICSTLL 58), 3–5 September 2025, University of Bern.
- VanBik, Kenneth. 2009. Proto-Kuki-Chin: A Reconstructed Ancestor of the Kuki-Chin Languages. STEDT Monograph 8. ISBN 0-944613-47-0.
- Zograf, Georgiĭ Aleksandrovich (1982), Languages of South Asia : a guide, London: Routledge & Kegan Paul – via archive.org
