= Purum people =

Ethnic group found in Manipur, Northeast India

Purum
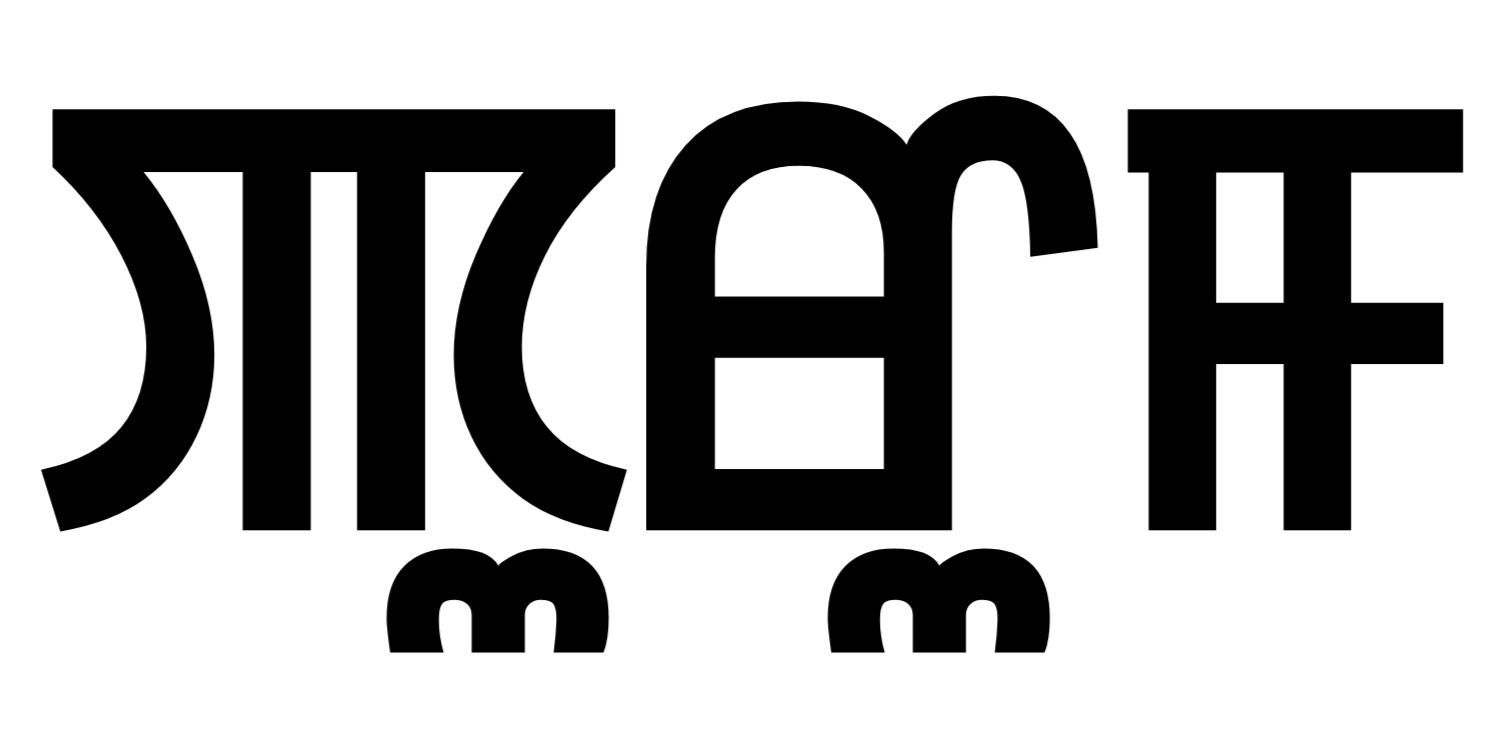
- Purum written in Meitei script

Total population
- 278

Languages
- Purum language (L1); Meitei language (L2)

Religion
- Christianity

Related ethnic groups
- Meitei people, Kharam

The Purums are a Tibeto-Burman indigenous ethnic group of Manipur state in India. They are (or were) notable because their marriage system is the subject of ongoing statistical and ethnographical analysis; Buchler states that "they are perhaps the most over-analyzed society in anthropology". Purums marry only in selected sibs; the allowed sibs are fixed by traditional customs. The Purums are divided into five sibs, namely, Marrim, Makan, Kheyang, Thao and Parpa. There is no indigenous centralized government. They use Meitei language as their second language (L2) according to the Ethnologue.

According to the 1931 Census of India, the Purums numbered 145 men and 158 women, all practising their ancestral ethnic religion; in 1936 they numbered 303 individuals but in the 1951 census they numbered only 43 individuals.
