= Kom language (India) =

Sino-Tibetan language spoken in India

Kom
- Kom Rem
- Region: India
- Ethnicity: Kom
- Native speakers: 15,108 (2011 census)
- Language family: Sino-Tibetan: Tibeto-Burman; Kuki-Chin–Naga; Kuki-Chin; Northwestern; Kom
- Dialects: Kom; Kolhreng

Language codes
- ISO 639-3: kmm
- Glottolog: komi1270
- ELP: Kom

Kom is a Kuki-Chin language, belonging to the Northwestern or "Old Kuki" subfamily, spoken by the Kom people of India. Kohlreng is usually considered a dialect of Kom, but may be a distinct language. Speakers of Kom live in the hilly provinces of Manipur and Northeast states of India.

== Geographical distribution ==
Speakers of Kom language are found in the northeastern Indian states of Manipur Nagaland, Assam, and Tripura. (2011:81), these 25 villages are listed as Teraphai, Nungkot Kom, Moirang Mantak, Laikot, Sinam Kom, Thayong Kom, Laikot Kom, Ichum Kom, Kom Keirap, Khoirentak, Sagang, Luikhumbi, Lallumbung, Mantak, Tuiringkhaison, Samulamlan, Chinglanmei, Bungsalane, Lananphai, Ngairong, Mungrushi, Sambangyan, Tonsen tampak, and Khulen.

some important Kom villages are located at :

- Saikul and Sinam-Kom of Kangpokpi district
- Greater Sagang of Churachandpur District

== Phonology ==
=== Consonants ===
		Labial	Alveolar	Palatal	Velar	Glottal
Plosive	voiceless	p	t	c	k	
Plosive	aspirated	pʰ	tʰ		kʰ	
Plosive	voiced	b	d			
Nasal		m	n		ŋ	
Fricative		v	s			h
Trill			r			
Approximant	lateral		l			
Approximant	central	w		j		

=== Vowels ===
	Front	Central	Back
Close	i		u
Mid	e	ə	o
Open	a		
