= Maring people (India) =

Tribe of Manipur, India

Maring
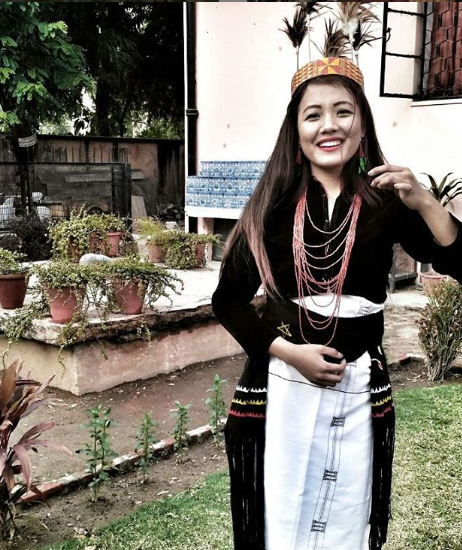

Total population
- 25,800

Languages
- Maring

Religion
- Christianity, Animism

The Maring people are a Tangkhul–Maring ethnic group of Northeast Indian state of Manipur. They live in the Chandel district along the north border and in the Tengnoupal district. They speak the Maring language. The Marings identify with the Naga people. The Marings do not have a system of hereditary chiefs.
