= Lamkang people =

Tibeto-Burman linguistic ethnic group in Manipur

Lamkang (Lamkang Naga)
Total population
- 7,771 approx, Manipur

Languages
- Lamkang language (L1); Meitei language (L2)

Religion
- Christianity

Related ethnic groups
- Meitei people, Anal Naga, other Naga people

The Lamkang people, also known as the Lamkang Naga, are a Tibeto-Burman linguistic ethnic group predominantly inhabitanting the Northeast Indian state of Manipur, and some parts of Sagaing Region in Myanmar. They are recognised as a Scheduled Tribe (STs) by India. They use Meitei language as their second language (L2) according to the Ethnologue.
