= Kom people (Manipur) =

Indigenous ethnic group in India

Kom (Kom Rem)
Komrem

Total population
- 14,602 (2001 Census)

Regions with significant populations
- India (Manipur)

Languages
- Kom (L1); Meitei language (L2)

Religion
- Christianity; Animism

Related ethnic groups
- Koireng; Meitei; Mizo; Zo; Naga

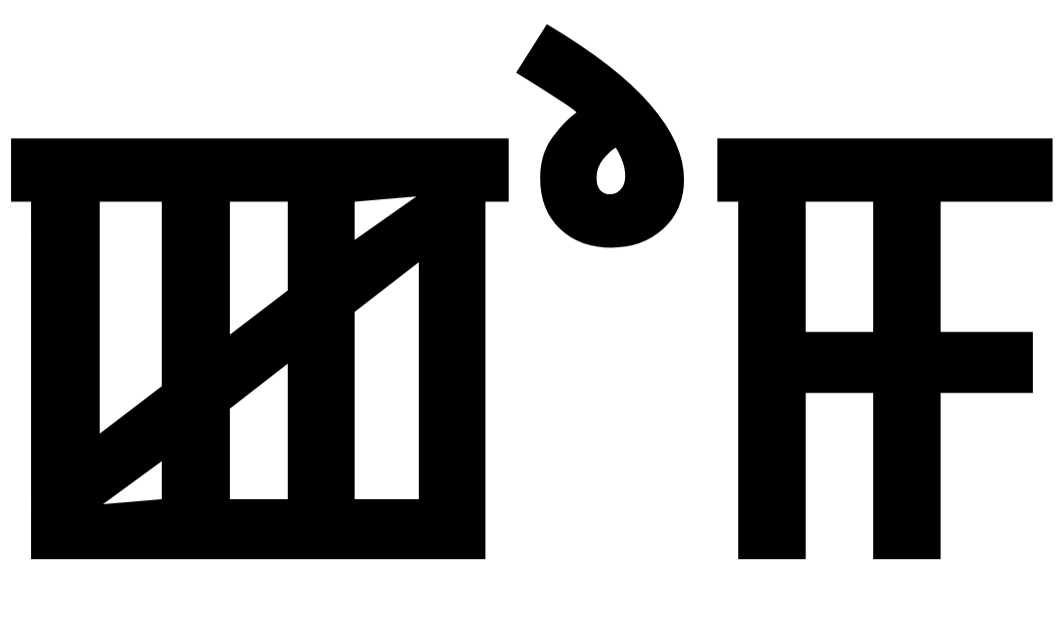
“Kom” written in Meithei script

The Kom people are a Tibeto-Burmese tribe mainly found in the state of Manipur in the northeastern India. The Kom clans include Karong, Serto, Leivon, Mangte and Telien. They speak Kom natively, a Tibeto-Burman language, but also use Meitei language as their second language (L2) according to the Ethnologue.

According to the 2001 Census of India, the population of Kom people is 14,602.

== Notable people ==
- Mary Kom, Indian Olympic boxer and politician
