= Purum language =

Sino-Tibetan language spoken in India

Purum
- Native to: India
- Region: Manipur
- Ethnicity: Purum people
- Native speakers: (500 cited 2001 census)
- Language family: Sino-Tibetan: Tibeto-Burman; Kuki-Chin–Naga; Kuki-Chin; Northwestern; Purum

Language codes
- ISO 639-3: pub
- Glottolog: puru1266
- Purum is classified as Critically Endangered language by the UNESCO Atlas of the World's Languages in Danger

Purum is a Kuki-Chin language, belonging to the Northwestern or "Old Kuki" subfamily. Speakers consider themselves to be ethnic Naga people, rather than part of the Kuki and Chin ethnic groups. Peterson (2017) classifies Purum as part of the Northwestern branch of Kuki-Chin. According Ethnologue, Purum shares a high degree of mutual intelligibility with Kharam. The speakers of this language use Meitei language as their second language (L2) according to the Ethnologue.

== Geographical distribution ==
Purum is spoken in Phaijol, Laikot, Thuisenpai, and Kharam Pallen villages of Senapati district, Manipur (Ethnologue).
