= List of populated places in Tengnoupal district =

Villages in Tengnoupal district of Manipur, India

The Tengnoupal district of Manipur state in India is divided into 3 administrative subdivisions called blocks. It has one town (Moreh), and 263 villages.

The district was carved out of the Chandel district in 2016, and did not exist at the time of the 2011 Census of India. The following list of populated places from the 2011 census is for the Machi and Tengnoupal blocks of the former Chandel district.

== Blocks ==
The district has three blocks: Moreh, Tengnoupal, and Machi. At the time of the 2011 census, the Machi and Tengnoupal blocks were part of the Chandel district, and the Moreh area was part of the Tengnoupal block.

Name	Population	Effective literacy rate	Sex ratio	SC population %	ST population %	Census code (2011)
Machi	19865	59.65%	980	0.05%	97.26%	01892
Tengnoupal	39245	70.51%	936	1.15%	77.0%	01893

== Towns ==
As of 2022, Moreh is the only town in the district. At the time of the 2011 census, Moreh was a part of the Tengnoupal block of the Chandel district.

Name	Type	Block	Population	Effective literacy rate	Sex ratio	SC population %	ST population %	Census code (2011)
Moreh	Small Town Committee	Moreh	16847	71.47%	943	0.24%	56.24%	801496

== Villages ==
=== Machi block (2011) ===
Name	Population	Effective literacy rate	Sex ratio	SC population %	ST population %	Census code (2011)
Thingkangbung	62	64.29%	879	0.0%	95.16%	270576
M.Ringpam	440	67.07%	1085	0.0%	97.95%	270577
Seloiyang	44	61.11%	1095	0.0%	100.0%	270578
Phoilenching	111	90.74%	168	2.7%	32.43%	270579
Wabaching	108	68.04%	929	0.0%	100.0%	270580
Marryland	308	45.26%	1184	0.0%	100.0%	270581
Tollen	144	62.73%	946	0.0%	97.22%	270582
Sl. Zoungam	119	65.96%	889	0.0%	99.16%	270583
Molphei	64	67.27%	1000	0.0%	100.0%	270584
New Foundland	23	95.24%	917	0.0%	100.0%	270585
Heinoukhong	273	58.58%	909	0.0%	97.8%	270586
Thamlai	250	63.06%	953	0.0%	99.6%	270587
Tonghlang	205	60.92%	783	0.0%	99.51%	270588
Pelyang	111	38.83%	914	0.0%	100.0%	270589
Hengyang	75	73.44%	875	0.0%	100.0%	270590
Konaitong	316	32.37%	927	0.0%	97.78%	270591
Khulsaibung(Karongthel)	948	42.5%	866	0.0%	99.47%	270592
Lamlong Khullen	902	49.1%	969	0.0%	99.67%	270593
Lamlong Christian	202	49.21%	1061	0.0%	99.01%	270594
Langol	1169	49.36%	978	0.0%	95.47%	270595
Langol Khunou	238	57.38%	1183	0.0%	98.32%	270596
Khunbi	886	41.0%	1105	0.0%	96.39%	270597
Machi	1403	68.27%	968	0.0%	98.22%	270598
Thabikeithel	133	61.98%	928	0.0%	100.0%	270599
Parengtong	287	53.41%	979	0.0%	98.26%	270600
Nungtak	157	70.83%	1122	0.0%	100.0%	270601
Haikot	100	46.67%	786	0.0%	99.0%	270602
Khoibu	253	89.52%	902	0.0%	98.42%	270603
Thallem	58	73.08%	1231	0.0%	100.0%	270604
Biyang	156	88.06%	880	0.0%	96.79%	270605
Yamolching	137	86.4%	1175	0.0%	100.0%	270606
Bongmol	209	63.24%	1090	0.0%	100.0%	270607
Bongli	163	63.97%	1264	0.0%	100.0%	270608
Gomi	102	88.0%	1000	0.0%	89.22%	270609
Semang	113	81.91%	915	0.0%	100.0%	270610
Samukom	178	78.68%	956	0.0%	100.0%	270611
Koijam	375	60.06%	1005	0.0%	96.27%	270612
Laiching Minou	877	48.98%	971	0.0%	97.83%	270613
Khangshim	579	88.29%	1039	0.0%	94.3%	270614
Haikakpokpi	91	78.95%	978	0.0%	98.9%	270615
Kuraopokpi	128	92.91%	939	0.0%	100.0%	270616
Salemram	441	85.89%	1080	0.0%	97.51%	270617
T.Hlangnom	0	NA	NA	NA	NA	270618
Nungourok	370	55.79%	869	0.0%	96.76%	270619
Laiching Khunou	293	61.8%	966	0.0%	97.95%	270620
Tuisimi	288	91.98%	1000	0.0%	93.75%	270621
Maringphai	401	88.7%	956	0.0%	95.76%	270622
Phungthil	157	81.82%	962	0.0%	100.0%	270623
Salemphai	126	78.18%	909	0.0%	96.83%	270624
P.S.Kananyao	111	95.7%	914	3.6%	96.4%	270625
Laiching Khullen	0	NA	NA	NA	NA	270626
Laiching Maipuo	549	66.38%	989	0.55%	93.44%	270627
Khukarthil	573	42.15%	949	0.0%	96.34%	270628
Laiching Kangshang	842	60.99%	1121	0.0%	97.39%	270629
Phaimancham	69	73.77%	1029	0.0%	98.55%	270630
Khunbi Tuisen	203	78.49%	1030	0.0%	99.51%	270631
Khunbi Tuinem	373	37.78%	1016	0.0%	98.93%	270632
Kangoi Khunou	210	39.7%	667	0.0%	86.67%	270633
Kangoi Khullen	805	44.4%	1038	0.0%	98.51%	270634
Samanphai	123	64.23%	892	0.0%	99.19%	270635
Khudei Khuman	142	40.83%	1185	0.0%	97.18%	270636
Phunchong	461	32.66%	996	0.0%	98.48%	270637
Chingjaroi	188	63.37%	979	0.0%	96.28%	270638
Keipham	79	73.24%	837	0.0%	100.0%	270639
Tengkonbung	67	88.89%	1030	0.0%	98.51%	270640
Chatong	42	88.1%	909	0.0%	100.0%	270641
Kulyang	136	84.38%	1030	0.0%	100.0%	270642
Sairel	104	62.63%	962	0.0%	99.04%	270643
Leithao	120	84.26%	1034	0.0%	99.17%	270644
Maohlang	95	71.76%	939	0.0%	98.95%	270645

=== Tengnoupal block (2011) ===
Name	Population	Effective literacy rate	Sex ratio	SC population %	ST population %	Census code (2011)
Island	256	79.92%	790	0.0%	98.05%	270646
L.Phaijang	165	91.03%	1062	0.0%	99.39%	270647
Teraphai	249	74.67%	1024	0.0%	99.2%	270648
Beauralam	236	59.19%	950	0.0%	98.31%	270649
A.Kombirei	201	83.63%	990	0.0%	97.01%	270650
A.Tampak	160	84.62%	1133	0.0%	100.0%	270651
A.Khudamphai	271	75.55%	993	0.0%	100.0%	270652
A.Chingnunghut	352	73.47%	1120	0.0%	98.3%	270653
A.Khullen	461	62.97%	1022	0.0%	99.13%	270654
A.Khunjai	231	59.69%	1009	0.0%	98.7%	270655
A.Chandonpokpi	47	61.36%	1043	0.0%	100.0%	270656
A.Ngairong	244	65.83%	1259	0.0%	98.36%	270657
A.Saitu	237	88.89%	866	0.0%	97.47%	270658
Molnom	314	83.09%	1093	0.0%	94.59%	270659
Phaichambung	191	67.54%	837	0.0%	100.0%	270660
Tuisomjang	145	78.72%	1071	0.0%	100.0%	270661
S.P.Saichang	167	69.46%	1088	0.0%	99.4%	270662
Zion	256	34.0%	925	0.0%	99.61%	270663
S.D.Munjang	145	77.78%	986	0.0%	100.0%	270664
Molnoi	281	85.55%	1113	0.0%	96.44%	270665
C. Gamnom	137	83.05%	986	0.0%	97.81%	270666
Theimungkung	266	90.53%	956	0.0%	88.35%	270667
H.Wajang	313	71.27%	1032	17.89%	78.59%	270668
Damjol	254	79.91%	1228	0.0%	98.03%	270669
Ringkhudam	66	95.08%	886	0.0%	98.48%	270670
Kanankhuren	122	73.21%	937	0.0%	95.9%	270671
H.Kotlenphai	460	86.09%	941	0.0%	98.48%	270672
L.Sijang	96	58.51%	959	0.0%	100.0%	270673
Senam	180	53.9%	1045	0.0%	96.11%	270674
Aigijang	108	86.41%	1038	0.0%	99.07%	270675
Saivom	254	79.57%	1228	0.0%	99.21%	270676
Tengnoupal	2158	76.02%	461	1.2%	60.52%	270677
Chahmol	268	65.61%	1015	0.0%	98.88%	270678
Angbrasu	351	85.86%	1089	0.0%	98.58%	270679
Moyon Khullen	79	37.18%	1257	0.0%	94.94%	270680
Phalbung	344	73.89%	1012	0.0%	96.22%	270681
Khudei Khullen	371	55.48%	995	0.0%	98.65%	270682
Modenphai	108	70.59%	1000	0.0%	97.22%	270683
T. Maipi	54	72.0%	742	0.0%	100.0%	270684
Sita	755	69.76%	1003	0.0%	98.15%	270685
Chehlep	269	39.81%	881	0.37%	99.26%	270686
Khudei Laipham	248	58.44%	938	0.0%	93.55%	270687
Loikong	143	35.88%	1103	0.0%	98.6%	270688
Leitan	152	45.13%	767	0.0%	98.03%	270689
Kambang Khullen	237	56.14%	1061	0.0%	99.58%	270690
Kambang Khunou	444	60.0%	914	0.0%	95.05%	270691
Rilam Centre	289	81.51%	1050	0.0%	96.54%	270692
Narum	268	80.83%	1046	0.0%	97.39%	270693
Lamjangtombi	62	82.46%	1138	0.0%	96.77%	270694
Kharou Khunou	230	79.04%	1091	0.0%	97.83%	270695
Choktong	121	69.23%	862	0.0%	98.35%	270696
Khaosat	70	45.59%	1333	0.0%	100.0%	270697
Saibol	253	46.59%	1057	0.0%	96.05%	270698
Moirengthel	116	78.38%	841	0.0%	100.0%	270699
Youngkhul	170	77.71%	848	0.0%	88.24%	270700
Sairel Saisem	110	49.51%	897	0.0%	100.0%	270701
Yangoupokpi	137	77.24%	986	0.0%	99.27%	270702
Kharou Khullen	206	61.86%	925	0.0%	98.06%	270703
Tatjang	123	61.17%	984	0.0%	100.0%	270704
New Leikot	153	69.44%	912	0.0%	100.0%	270705
D. Monaphai	194	57.14%	960	0.0%	98.97%	270706
New Shijang	166	47.18%	976	0.0%	99.4%	270707
L. Phunchong	170	47.86%	1073	0.0%	99.41%	270708
Tuipi Mate	73	96.83%	872	0.0%	94.52%	270709
Wakshu	91	60.87%	1116	0.0%	97.8%	270710
Lamlong Khunou	440	82.2%	1066	0.0%	96.14%	270711
Yangoutubi	74	68.75%	1242	0.0%	98.65%	270712
Langkhongching	62	55.77%	722	0.0%	100.0%	270713
Satang	130	46.22%	1063	0.0%	95.38%	270714
Leibi	576	68.91%	979	0.0%	99.48%	270715
Khongkhang	321	58.48%	1006	0.0%	99.07%	270716
S.Khudengthabi	408	94.93%	838	0.0%	90.93%	270717
K .Zalenmoul	139	100.0%	1075	0.0%	97.84%	270718
Kwatha	327	56.08%	958	99.69%	0.0%	270719
H.Mongjang	318	88.05%	1038	0.0%	99.37%	270720
K. Moulshang	278	79.92%	1014	0.0%	99.64%	270721
N. Champhai	145	76.74%	1042	0.0%	98.62%	270722
S. M. Lhangjol.	90	75.0%	1093	0.0%	100.0%	270723
B.Bongjang	157	68.84%	1093	0.0%	97.45%	270724
Govajang	123	76.36%	952	0.0%	99.19%	270725
S.Moljol	192	72.93%	1065	0.0%	99.48%	270726
Tinnu Munjang	88	84.93%	1000	0.0%	100.0%	270727
Khonomphai	157	60.56%	915	0.0%	100.0%	270728
Maipi Mangsom	119	73.96%	831	0.0%	100.0%	270729
Mankang Khunthak	0	NA	NA	NA	NA	270730
T.Minou	0	NA	NA	NA	NA	270731
Maojang	212	57.4%	1141	0.0%	98.11%	270732
B.Sangreng	0	NA	NA	NA	NA	270733
Leisan Tengnoupal	170	20.93%	1024	0.0%	95.88%	270734
Chonjang	129	13.21%	1150	0.0%	99.22%	270735
T.Yangom	131	51.59%	955	0.0%	100.0%	270736
Chalson Tengnoupal	370	24.66%	947	0.0%	100.0%	270737
Touthang Bongmol	242	85.34%	1017	0.0%	97.93%	270738
Yangoubung	426	87.69%	1009	0.0%	99.06%	270739
T.Khonomjang	269	33.77%	793	0.0%	99.26%	270740
New Mongjang	95	82.5%	1065	0.0%	98.95%	270741
Youjang (Mate)	62	81.63%	1296	0.0%	100.0%	270742
Chikim	300	84.29%	1000	0.0%	98.0%	270743
