= Hmaric languages =

Languages of the Hmar people

- Hmar ṭawnghai
- Pronunciation: [m̥áːr]
- Native to: India
- Region: Mizoram, Manipur, Assam, Tripura, and Meghalaya
- Ethnicity: Hmar
- Language family: Sino-Tibetan: Kuki-Chin; Central; Mizoic; Hmaric languages
- Writing system: Latin

Official status
- Recognised minority language in: Assam, Manipur and Mizoram

Language codes
- ISO 639-3: –
- Glottolog: hmar1240

The Hmaric languages (Hmar ṭawnghai) or Hmar languages are a subbranch of the Kukish-Mizo branch of the Sino-Tibetan language family which comprises Hmar proper (Khawsak Țawng/Trawng) Țhiek/Thriek, Saihriem (Faihriem), Leiri, Dulien/Duhlian(a sub-clan of Faihriem) and others. The Hmar languages are often treated as dialects of a single language, since differences between them are reportedly minor. The speakers of the language are also known as Hmar.

In Manipur, Hmar exhibits partial mutual intelligibility with the other Kukish dialects of the area including Thadou, Paite, Vaiphei, Simte, Kom and Gangte languages.
