= Kuki–Paite Conflict =

Ethnic conflict in Manipur, India

Kuki–Zomi Conflict
- Kuki–Zomi Conflict
- Date: 24 July 1997 – 29 September 1998
- Location: Churachandpur district, Manipur, India
- Caused by: Tribal divisions
- Methods: Assaults; arson; destruction of property; forced displacement; ambushes; attacks on means of transport

Parties
Thadou-Kuki people * Kuki National Front	Paite people * Zomi Revolutionary Army	Government of India * Indian Army

Casualties
- Deaths: 352
- Injuries: 136
- Buildings destroyed: 4,670 houses

The Kuki–Paite Conflict, also called Kuki–Zomi Conflict, was an ethnic conflict during 1997–1998 between tribal communities in Churachandpur district in Manipur, India. The cause of the conflict may be regarded as the desire for leadership within the tribes, pitting one group that subscribed to the Kuki label against another group that subscribed to the Zomi label, the latter being led by the Paites. The conflict started in June 1997 and lasted for over a year, during which 352 people died, thousands of homes were destroyed and over 13,000 people were displaced. The Government of India sent in the Indian Army to attempt to stop the violence, but peace was restored in September–October 1998 only with the initiative of the Church.

== Background ==
In 1948, 21 tribes of Manipur that shared the "Kuki" label per the British nomenclature formed a joint organisation called Kuki Company based at Kuki Inn in Imphal. After the formation, however, frictions began to develop due to the predominance of the Thadou language in the grouping. As a result, some 14 tribes left the group and formed a separate Khul Union. After the rise of the United Naga Council and NSCN-IM in the 1980s, some of the tribes that had been called "Old Kuki" in the British nomenclature quit the Kuki umbrella and joined the Naga grouping.

Seven "Zo Ethnic" tribes, (Note: Thadous make up the largest of the 'New Kuki' tribes, forming 9.16% of Manipur's population by the 2011 census. The Paites are the second largest tribe with 1.92% of the population.) stood on their own for some time, but eventually adopted the Zomi label. These seven tribes, including Hmar, Zou, Vaiphei, Gangte, Simte, Paite and a collection of smaller tribes that simply called themselves "Zomi", formed the Zomi Re-unification Organisation (ZRO) in 1995. (Note: The name resembles an earlier organisation, "Zo-Reunification Organisation" (ZORO), formed in 1988, but has quite different motivations.) For political security for the unified tribes, an armed wing called Zomi Revolutionary Army (ZRA) was also formed by the seven tribes, which caused unease among the Kuki group. The Kuki group, which had its own armed group Kuki National Front (KNF) and used social taxes to fund it, started to levy more taxes and also demanded them from the tribes belonging to the "Zomi" group. Thus the tribes calling themselves "Kuki" and those calling themselves "Zomi" came to loggerheads.

== Start of hostilities ==
On 24 June 1997, KNF militants lined up 20 villagers in Saikul and shot them, killing nine and wounding four.

These killings started a series of communal violence that also drew in smaller ethnic groups. Several hundred Indian soldiers were moved into Churachandpur to restore order. A peace agreement was negotiated after a few days by dignitaries from Mizoram Peace Mission, namely, Pu C. Chawngkunga, Pu H. Zathuam and Pu F. Lawmkima. It was signed by the KNF(P) and the ZRO at Mata Dam in Churachandpur on 8 July 1997.

Two days later, KNF(P) militants invaded Mata village, breaking the agreement.

The warring parties were brought together again on 18 July 1997 to reaffirm the agreement. However, the KNF (P) then attacked Leijangphai, Tallian and Savaipaih, burning thirteen houses.

== Final peace ==
On 29 September 1998, to make amends for the Saikul massacre and to end the conflict, the Kuki Inpi Manipur invited the Zomi Council to a feast.

The next day, the Zomi Council reciprocated by inviting the Kukis to a feast. Hence, the conflict ended.

== Conflict toll ==
Over 50 villages were destroyed and some 13 000 people were displaced. According to official records kept by the Government of Manipur, the communal violence killed 352 persons, injured 136 and destroyed 4,670 houses. The majority moved to areas surrounding the district capital of Churachandpur and Mizoram, where they were housed in makeshift refugee centres in schools, hospitals and various other buildings.

== Peace agreement ==
The terms of the peace agreement were as follows:

1. That the nomenclatures Kuki and Zomi shall be mutually respected by all Zomis and Kukis. Every individual or group of persons shall be at liberty to call himself or themselves by any name, and the nomenclature KUKI and ZOMI shall not in any way be imposed upon any person or group against his/their will at any point of time.
2. That, any person who has occupied or has physical possession of any land/private building/houses and quarters wrongfully and illegally during the period of clashes shall return and restore to the rightful owners, such lands and buildings.
3. That, no Kuki or Zomi militant shall indulge themselves in any forcible collection of funds, taxes etc., against their counterpart nomenclature be it from the Government Officials, individuals, contractors, and business establishments.
4. That, all points of MoUs between the Kuki Inpi and the Zomi Council shall be operative and binding to all concerned persons and parties including the government.

== See also ==
- Kuki-Naga conflict in Manipur
- 2023 Manipur violence

== Bibliography ==
- Haokip, Rebecca C. (2007). "The Kuki-Paite Conflict in the Churachandpur District of Manipur". In Lazar Jeyaseelan (ed.). Conflict mapping and peace processes in North East India (PDF). North Eastern Social Research Centre. pp. 185–207. Archived from the original (PDF) on 18 December 2023.
- Haokip, T. S. Letkhosei (2018), Ethnicity and Insurgency in Myanmar/Burma: A Comparative Study of the Kuki-Chin and Karen Insurgencies, Educreation Publishing
- Kipgen, Nehginpao (October–December 2011), "Ethnic Conflict in India: A Case Study of the Kukis and the Nagas in Manipur", The Indian Journal of Political Science, 72 (4): 1043–1060, JSTOR 41856539
- Ngaihte, S. Thianlalmuan (2010), "Kuki-Zomi Conflict", Role of Paite Elites in the Construction of Paite and Zomi Identities in Manipur, Shillong: North-Eastern Hill University, pp. 179–182, SSRN 2160232
