= Simte =

Simte may refer to:

- Simte people, a tribal people of northeastern India
- Simte language, their Kuki-Chin (Sino-Tibetan) language
