= Hrangkhol =

Hrangkhol or Hrangkhawl may refer to:

- Hrangkhol people, of Tripura, India; related to the Halam people
- Hrangkhol language, their Kuki-Chin (Sino-Tibetan) language
