= Vaiphei =

Vaiphei may refer to:

- Vaiphei people, an ethnic group who inhabit the North-East part of India, Bangladesh and Burma
- Vaiphei language, a Kuki-Chin language of India
