= Ralte people =

Sub-tribe of Mizo people

The Ralte or Galte is a sub-tribe of Mizo people. The Ralte language is a Northern Kuki-Chin language, similar to Thadou. According to Ethnologue, there are 34,000 Ralte speakers, mostly in Mizoram and Assam.

== Notable people ==
- Zodintluanga Ralte, politician
- Lalchhandama Ralte, politician
- Lalengmawia Ralte, footballer
- Ralte L. Thanmawia, educator and writer
