= Vaiphei people =

Zo-Mizo ethnic group in Manipur and Myanmar

Vaiphei
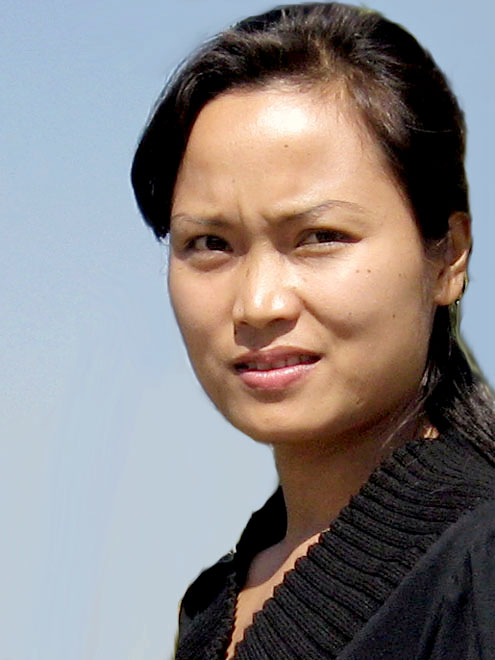
- A Vaiphei girl.

Total population
- 43,000 (2011 Census)

Regions with significant populations
- Manipur, Assam, Mizoram, Tripura, Meghalaya, Nagaland, Myanmar (Burma)

Languages
- Vaiphei language

Religion
- Christianity; folk religion

Related ethnic groups
- Mizo; Chin; Kuki; Hmar; Mizo; Simte; Gangte; Zou; Paite; Ranglong

The Vaiphei people are an ethnic group who live in the North-East Indian states of Manipur, Assam, Mizoram, Nagaland, Meghalaya, Tripura and in the Chin State of Myanmar. They share cultural similarities with other tribes in the region like Mizo, Paite, Thadou, Simte, Hmar, Zou people, Gangte and Kom (collectively known as the Zo-Mizo people) or Zo.

== History ==
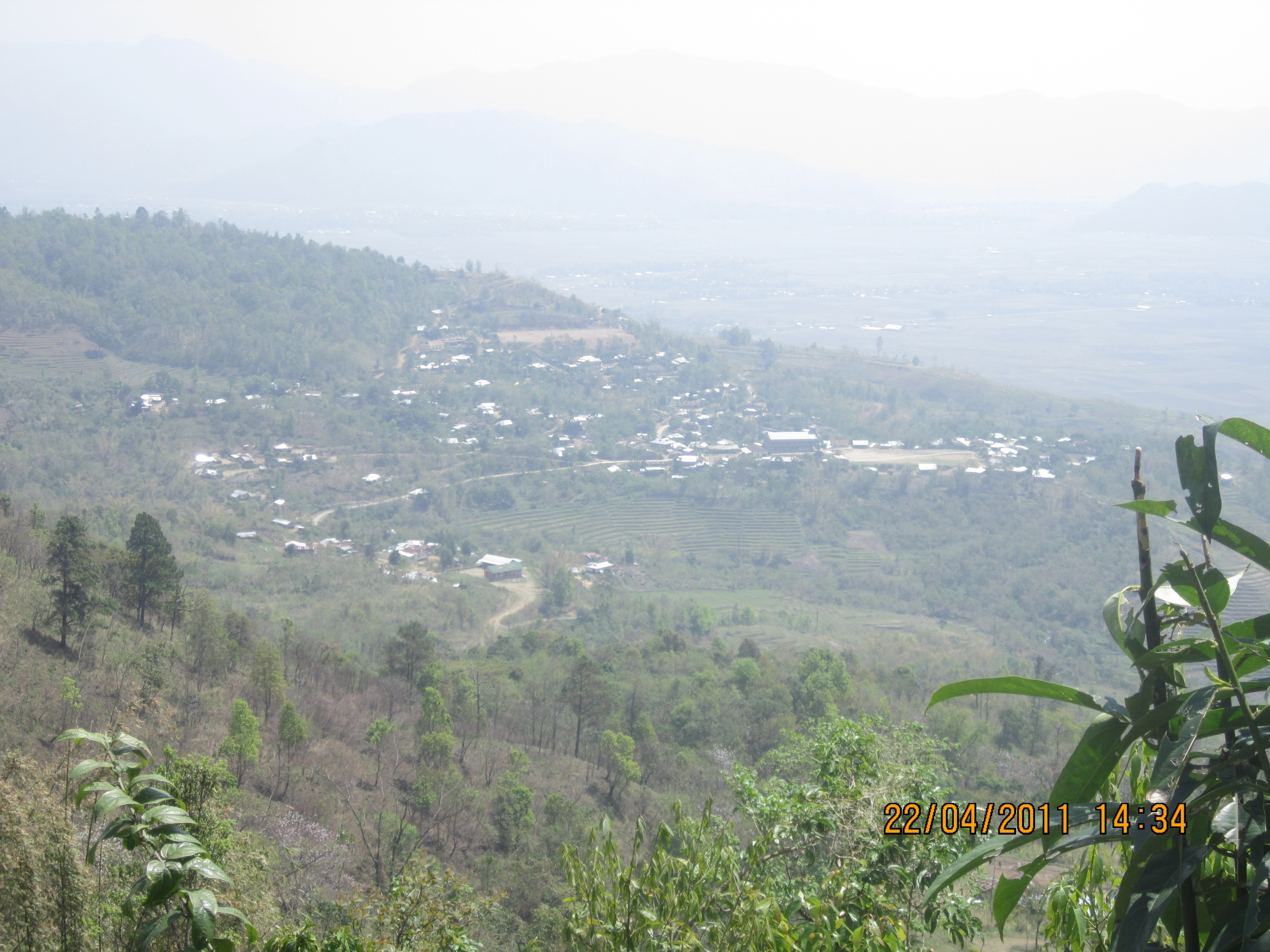
Leilon, a Vaiphei village.

The Vaipheis Origin and Migration have a multitude of theories.

According to a theory preserved in their tradition, the term originated from Phaiza, a village established by the Suantak family in the Chin Hills of present-day Myanmar. As the settlement prospered and its population increased, various groups and sub-clans migrated into the village. Owing to its geographical expansion along the horizontal ridge of a hill, the settlement came to be known as Khaw-Vaiphei, meaning "a village expanded breadth-wise." Over time, the inhabitants of the village became identified as Khaw-Vaipheite or Phaiza-Vaipheite, meaning "the people of Khaw-Vaiphei" or "the people of Phaiza-Vaiphei." According to this account, the term gradually evolved into an ethnonym representing the Vaiphei people between the sixteenth and seventeenth centuries.

The tradition also holds that during their settlement at Phaiza, the Vaiphei developed a distinctive dance and song tradition known as Thazing Lam ("Autumn Dance"), which later became an important cultural festival among the Vaiphei. In addition, a number of traditional folk songs and victory chants, known as Hanla, are said to support this theory. This theory is backed by Letkhosei, a respected historian from Nagaland. He mentioned that the Thadous had also once lived in Khawvaiphei. He also claimed that Khawvaiphei was a village of Vaipheis where many tribes lived together peacefully for a long time and that as other related tribes moved to different areas, the Suantaks remained in the village. They were the last to migrate, which is why they carry the village name and are identified as the "Vaipheis." Hence, wherever they went, they were recognized as Vaiphei. Another version says that the Suantaks, who later came to known to be Vaiphei used to live with communities in Liankhama Sailo village. Once, a Pawi named Thangvuka killed a Suantak. This made the Suantaks infuriated and caused them to take revenge. The Suantaks chased Thangvuka around the village but he took refugee in chiefs house. In their customs when someone runs to the chiefs house for protection they can't be hurt as they become a slave known as "Bawi". Due to this, Suantaks were unable to obtain revenge, so they had decided to leave the village in mass, called an Vai in-an-phei tawh a which means "they departed together" or "they went into exodus." And hence, they attained the name "Vaiphei". These two theories theorize the etymology to be developed either from the Phaiza–Khaw-Vaiphei village tradition or from the Liankhama Sailo village incident tradition. Despite these explanations, several Suantak-related groups who had not resided in the village associated with the origin of the term objected to being identified as "Vaiphei." Consequently, many of them continued to identify themselves as "Suantak." As the Ralte people were their neighbours from the time they moved along the Ngun course and set up Phaiza, about 50% of Vaiphei vocabulary are borrowed from them and the other 50%, built up of Thadou, Paite, Tedim-Chin, Lusei, Hmar and the traditional shawls "Khiangkawi" and "Puandum" are also said to have been replicas of the Ralte's.

In regard, certain Suantak clans, including the Misao, Lupho, Lupheng, Dopmul, Sektak, Sailo, and Siyin of Myanmar, did not accept "Vaiphei" as their ethnic designation. These groups maintained that they had never lived in Khawvaiphei, the village linked to the origin of the name. Nevertheless, they acknowledged Suantak as their common ancestral progenitor.

In Vaiphei oral tradition, Suantak, once lived in an underground realm known as Khul alongside many other inhabitants. During this period, Nuaimangpa, the king of the subterranean world, organized a grand feast called Chawn. As part of the celebration, the youths participated in a high-jump event in which contestants leaped over a mithun. Zahong, an ancestor associated with Suantak, did not initially take part, as he was occupied with cutting bamboo for making nangmet, a type of binding thread. Zahong was later invited to join the competition. During his jump over the mithun, he accidentally struck a pregnant woman with his sword, causing her death. Due to the distress and shame brought to Zahong after this incident, he decided to leave the subterranean world and journey to the outside world. The name "Zahong" is traditionally interpreted as deriving from the words Za ("many") and Hong ("opened"), signifying "one who opened the way for many people" or "opened the gate for hundreds." Among those said to have followed Zahong out of the cave was Chongthu, who is regarded as the progenitor of the Thadou people. Thus, Chongthu, regarded as the progenitor of the Thadou people, emerged from the cave immediately after Zahong but chose a different route. Before departing, he is said to have marked his direction on a tree known as Khawngma, distinguished by its bright color and appearance of perpetual freshness. Many people subsequently followed Chongthu along this path.

In relation to the Khul origin tradition, Pu Ngulkholun Khongsai proposed that the Chin–Kuki–Mizo peoples, considered part of the Tibeto-Burman linguistic stock, once inhabited a place called Khul (meaning "cave", known as "Sinlung" to other communties) located within the region associated in tradition with the Great Wall of China. According to his account, groups led by Chongthu, Chongja, and Zahong emerged from the cave and gradually settled across various regions, including present-day Myanmar, Bangladesh, and India. Those who emerged from the cave were collectively referred to as "Khullians".

John Shakespeare, the first Superintendent of the British Lushai Hills, in his monograph The Lushei Kuki Clans, wrote that a village site known as Vai-tui-chhun, meaning "the watering place of the Vai" existed a short distance east of Aizawl. According to him, the site commemorated an earlier settlement of the Vaiphei people.

Shakespeare further suggested that the Aimol and Vaiphei communities may have abandoned their former settlements as a result of the expansion of the Lushai groups. The village associated with this tradition is believed to have been located somewhere in the Lushai Hills. This theory, like earlier explanations, associates the origin of the ethnonym "Vaiphei" with a specific place of settlement, implying that the tribal identity evolved from the name of that locality.

Further references to the historical origins and settlement patterns of the Vaiphei people are found in the writings of British colonial administrators and ethnographers. In their work on the Chin Hills, Bertram S. Carey and H. N. Tuck described the remains of an ancient Vaiphei village located on the summit of Lunglen Peak. According to their account, the settlement was heavily fortified with boulders and defensive stone structures known as sungars. The village entrance was reportedly protected by a rock face that had been cut vertically for approximately ten feet, making access possible only by ladder. Lunglen Peak, situated along the western section of the Chin–Manipur boundary, rises to approximately 6,531 feet above sea level and was described as one of the most prominent peaks in the northern region.

Carey and Tuck further observed that the Vaiphei, who had by then largely disappeared from the Chin Hills, left behind extensive traces of fortified settlements. Their villages were strategically constructed on steep mountain summits, and pathways leading to them were deliberately narrowed, blocked, or cut away so that only single-file movement toward the gates was possible. These defensive arrangements reflected the insecurity and intertribal conflicts characteristic of the hill regions during earlier periods.

On the summit of Lunglen peak is found the remains of an ancient Vaipe (Vaiphei) village, which was defended in a most extraordinary manner by boulders and sungars. Finally, just in front of the fortified gate, the rock had been cut perpendicular for 10 feet, which necessitated the use of a ladder before it could be scaled.

— H.N. Tuck, The Chin Hills. Rangoon.

Additional traditions regarding these settlements were recorded by Kaihau Vaiphei in his work Maite Days. He stated that the Vaiphei once inhabited these fortified settlements together with related groups such as the Lusei, Chawnthu, and Khiangte. According to his account, the Lusei occupied villages including Seipui, Saihmun, Khawkawk, and Suaipui, while the Chawnthu resided in settlements such as Sanzawl and Bochung. The Khiangte were said to have inhabited Lungchhuan, Pelpawl, and Belmul. Kaihau Vaiphei estimated that these settlements dated to around 1460 CE, suggesting that the ethnonym "Vaiphei" may already have been in use during this period.

Colonial records also mention later Vaiphei settlements in other regions. The Gazetteer of Villages in The Chin Hills, Volume II recorded a Vaiphei village of approximately one hundred houses at Losau under the leadership of Chief Pu Laltual. The inhabitants were believed to have migrated from Kaptual village in the Tedim area. Similar references were made by T. C. Hodson in The Naga Tribes of Manipur, where he described encountering stone sculptures and water troughs in jungle areas formerly inhabited by Kabui communities but later occupied by the Vaiphei, whom he identified as a Kuki sub-tribe.

Although British colonial officers did not attempt to determine precisely how the Vaiphei acquired their name, their writings provide important evidence regarding the migration, settlement, and historical presence of the Vaiphei people in the Indo–Myanmar borderlands. These records suggest that the community had already acquired the name "Vaiphei" prior to their settlement in the hills along the present-day India–Myanmar frontier. Consequently, colonial era monographs and administrative records remain significant sources for reconstructing the early history and movements of the Vaiphei people.

=== Migration ===
Historical and oral sources suggest that the Vaipheis later migrated from the Chin Hills into present-day Manipur around the 16th century. Traditional accounts state that Vaiphei ancestors crossed the Kenny Peak from the Kale Valley and established settlements in places such as Cimnuai, Suantakjang, and Khuasak. Frequent inter-village warfare, particularly attacks by the Pawis, caused heavy casualties among the inhabitants and forced many Vaipheis to migrate westward into the hill regions of Manipur. Shakespeare classified the Vaipheis among the "Old Kuki" clans and noted that these groups appeared in the Manipur chronicles as early as the sixteenth century, Although it is said they moved themselves to Kamhou and from there they began to enter the south eastern hilly regions of Manipur around 1891 A.D.

Today, the majority of Vaipheis reside in Manipur, although significant populations are also found in Assam, Meghalaya, Mizoram, and Tripura. Smaller communities continue to inhabit the Siyin region of the Chin Hills and parts of the Sagaing Region in Myanmar. Many of these settlements maintain close kinship and cultural ties across the India-Myanmar border.

Scholars and oral historians generally attribute Vaiphei migration to 'push factors' such as inter-village warfare, famine, persecution, and infertile land rather than economic attraction or expansion.

== Culture ==
Vaiphei society is patriarchal and holds a heavy emphasis on respect for elders. Anyone older to the individual is greeted with the prefix 'U' before their names. A married man/woman is no longer called by their given names, rather they are acknowledged by the name of their first born child. Inheritance and lineage go through the eldest male of the family.

=== Village Institutions ===
Families in a village are interconnected through kinship and familial ties maintained through various institutions. Whatever the village parliament is to the whole village, the institution of Becha-Tucha is to the family. The institution is an important part of the Vaiphei social structure. The Becha and Tucha are fundamentally house councils drawn from families belonging either to the same or cognate Vaipheis clans. Thus, the institution is also an important interlink without which no social or cultural activities regarding the family could be undertaken. Becha are trusted representatives chosen from families closely related to a household, usually from the same clan. Typically, two Becha are formally appointed by the household during a social function. They act on behalf of the household in feasts and social observances, carrying out decisions of the household council and managing its social responsibilities. The institution of Becha also strengthens cooperation and mutual assistance among families and clans within the village community. Tucha in contrast, is from the son-in-law's family, assigned to assist the family. Becha and Tucha are entitled to a certain portion of meat when an animal is slaughtered in observance of important events. While this also kept them under obligation, it was also a repayment for the services rendered selflessly to the household.

=== Marriage and Divorce ===
Marriage among the Vaiphei is traditionally exogamous, permitting unions between different families but prohibiting marriage within the same clan. Marriage is regarded as a contractual alliance between two families and commonly involves the payment of a bride price to the bride's family, traditionally ranging from two to ten mithun (Sial), with variations across clans and villages. In return, the bride's family organises a ceremonial feast known as Mou sathah and presents bridal goods such as khival (necklace), nik (skirt), puan (traditional cloth), and three sathils. According to Neihsial (1997), the Vaiphei recognise three forms of marriage: Chawngmo, Kitaipih, and Nungakgu. Chawngmo refers to a negotiated marriage initiated by either family, usually formalised after the groom's family approaches the bride's family with Zu (rice beer) and mutual consent is reached. Kitaipih denotes marriage by elopement, in which the couple marries without prior parental approval, after which the groom's family seeks formal acceptance from the bride's family. Nungakgu refers to an unconsented marriage in which no prior agreement exists between the couple or their families, the girl may be persuaded or wooed by the boy or his intermediary with the intention of marriage. Divorce and dissolution of marriage are permissible in Vaiphei society but are governed by strict customary regulations and deliberated upon by both household councils and village authorities. If the wife initiates the divorce, the bride price is returned to the groom's family, whereas if the husband seeks dissolution, he is required to pay a fine of one mithun, known as Sialpi salam. In cases of divorce, children traditionally remain under the guardianship of the father, although the mother may retain custody of a newborn child until the age of three.

With the arrival of Christianity and missionary education, Vaiphei marriage customs underwent major changes, as several traditional practices were modified or discontinued to align with Christian norms, creating a blend of traditional and Christian wedding forms. While the basic structure of marriage remains recognisable, ceremonies are now usually held in churches and officiated by a pastor instead of the traditional Thiampu (priest). The ritual role of Zu in marriage negotiations and ceremonies has been replaced by modest celebrations, often including tea ceremonies. Though, customary negotiations involving Makpas (son in laws) as Palais (mediators) in bride price arrangements still take place before church ceremonies, showing that traditional obligations continue to remain relevant even among Christian converts.

Overall, the ceremony has undergone significant ritual change, with most traditional rites abandoned. The pastor now conducts the wedding using Biblical readings, replacing the Thiampu who earlier performed sacrifices. Western influence is also visible in wedding attire, with brides wearing white gowns and grooms wearing tuxedos, replacing earlier indigenous dress forms.

==== Festivals ====
There are at least fourteen important festivals and feasts of merit among the Vaipheis, which function not only as occasions of celebration but also carry significant symbolic meaning for village life and community cohesion. The main festivals include Thazing, Haukatuk, Sazawl, Tha thawt, Sa Kawm, Phaisa zu, Sawm zu, Lawm zu, Lawmchang vawk, Nauzu nek, and Nauzu khawn thak, while major feasts of merit include Sa ai, Bu ai, Gallu ai, and Gawi Chawkik, with Zu (rice beer) forming an essential component in most rituals alongside music and dance. Thazinglap, the largest and most elaborate festival, is an autumn pre-harvest celebration lasting over a month, marked by structured songs (Thazing la) and dances (Thazing laam) performed at different times of the day under village-wide participation. Other festivals vary in scale and organisation, such as Haukatuk and Sazawl, which resemble merit feasts but differ in that Haukatuk is hosted by individuals who have killed large wild animals, while Tha thawt, Phaisa zu, and Lawm-related festivals are smaller social or familial gatherings centred on feasting, drinking, and communal participation. Rituals such as Nauzu nek and Nauzu khawn thak commemorate childbirth, while Bu ai and Gawi Chawkik are harvest-related ceremonies expressing gratitude for successful cultivation and assistance in agricultural work. Feasts of merit such as Sa ai and Gallu ai are linked to achievements in hunting and warfare, with Sa ai commemorating the killing of significant wild animals and Gallu ai associated with taking an enemy's head, both conferring high social prestige. The highest level of achievement is recognised through the Chawn ceremony, which follows the successful performance of major feasts and confers the title of Thangsua, symbolised by ritual practices, communal feasting, and the presentation of Thangsua puan (shawl) woven by women.

=== Instruments ===
The Vaipheis use several indigenous musical instruments to accompany songs and dances, the most important being the Dak (gong). Smaller sets of gongs, known as Dakbu, are also commonly used. The Khuang (drum), made from dried animal skin, is widely used in worship services and funeral rites and remains popular today in various sizes. Other traditional instruments include the Gawsem (bamboo bagpipe with seven reeds), Dingdung (wooden xylophone), Chamngai (flute), Pheiphit (small bamboo flute), Ting tang (bamboo string violin), Pengkul (trumpet), Pek khuang (a stringed bamboo tube), and Sialki (a Mithun horn).

=== Dance ===
Among the most popular dances is Thigalnaw, while other important folk dances include Phitlaam, Salu lap laam, Dakcha laam, Thazinglap laam, Sukta laam, and Lampak laam. These are typically accompanied by instruments such as the Gawsem, Sialki, Dakbu, and Khuang. The Thazinglap laam, performed during the Thazinglap festival, is particularly significant, with young men and women dancing together in festive attire. Men traditionally wear the Tukpak headscarf decorated with cotton threads and eagle feathers, while women wear colourful bamboo and feather headgear. This dance and its costumes carry symbolic meaning beyond entertainment, reflecting the cultural and ritual significance of the Thazinglap festival.

=== Games ===
Traditional Vaiphei games include a wide range of indigenous sports and recreational activities. These include Kituk tua (kabaddi-like game), Kung kaan (high jump), Kichawp (long jump), Kitai tep (running race), Kibuan (wrestling), Khut kibawt (arm wrestling), Tuangkap (shooting tops), Thalkap (archery), Thilgik dawp (weight lifting), Cheikha khaw (javelin throw), Sukh khaw (wooden pestle game), Suang se (shot put), Kang kap (black bead game), Kikai tua (tug of war), Ki akchal suh (cock fighting), Uphawk chawp (frog jump), Shuang sui (hopscotch), and Suk hek (wrestling and twisting of wooden pestle). In addition to these structured sports, both children and adults also engage in informal traditional games such as Akuk kuk, Zawng aw leilawn, Pi pe sel ah kawi, Changnu changpa, Sang sata dawl lep, Lut hiai hiai, Nungak e Tangval e ki eng pimpem, A lawnglawng, Luai ah kilaui, Ki lep tua, and Khau ah kichop.
