= Kuki conflict =

Kuki conflict may refer to these conflicts in Manipur, India involving the Kuki people:

- Kuki–Naga conflict in Manipur
- Kuki–Paite Conflict
- Manipur conflict (2023–present)
