= Kuki National Organisation =

Umbrella body of Kuki-Zo armed groups in India and Myanmar

- Leaders: P. S. Haokip (president and supreme commander); Seilen Haokip (spokesperson)
- Dates active: 24 February 1988 – present
- Active regions: Manipur, India; Sagaing Region, Myanmar
- Ideology: Kuki-Zo ethnic nationalism Self-determination
- Size: c. 2,200 cadres, with the United People's Front (2025)
- Wars: Insurgency in Northeast India; Myanmar civil war

The Kuki National Organisation (KNO) is an umbrella body of Kuki-Zo armed groups operating in the hill districts of Manipur in northeast India and across the border in the Sagaing Region of Myanmar. Founded on 24 February 1988, it functions as a political front for the Kuki-Zo nationalist cause, advocating a proposed homeland called Zale'n-gam, and serves as the political organisation associated with the Kuki National Army (KNA), its principal armed wing, with around a dozen smaller militant outfits affiliated to it. P. S. Haokip has led the body since its founding and holds the title of president and supreme commander of the KNA. Its spokesperson is Seilen Haokip.

The KNO and the parallel umbrella body, the United People's Front (UPF), have been parties to a tripartite Suspension of Operations (SoO) agreement with the Government of India and the Government of Manipur since August 2008. Around 2,200 cadres drawn from the two umbrella bodies are housed in fourteen designated camps in the hill districts under the terms of the pact. Across the border, the Myanmar wing of the KNA, generally referred to as the Kuki National Army-Burma (KNA-B), resumed armed operations against the Tatmadaw after the 2021 Myanmar coup d'état and has fought alongside the Kachin Independence Army and the People's Defence Force.

Although the KNO presents itself as a political negotiator for the Kuki-Zo cause, Indian security analysts, successive state governments and rival ethnic bodies have linked groups under its umbrella to extortion, illegal poppy cultivation and the recruitment of minors as combatants. These allegations are contested by Kuki-Zo organisations and by some independent reporting. KNO-affiliated cadres have also been accused of taking part in attacks on Indian security forces and civilians during the Manipur conflict that began in 2023, allegations the leadership has neither fully accepted nor wholly denied.

== Background ==
=== Setting before 1988 ===
Sections of the Kuki population of Manipur had taken part in the Greater Mizoram movement until the Mizo Accord was signed in 1986. The decline of that movement coincided with the rise of the National Socialist Council of Nagaland (NSCN) and its objective of a "Greater Nagalim" that would incorporate Naga-inhabited tracts of Manipur. According to Kuki accounts, Kuki villages in the northern hills then came under a campaign of intimidation and forced eviction.

Tensions developed into open communal violence between 1992 and 1997, in what is commonly described as the Kuki-Naga clashes. The most widely cited single episode is the Joupi massacre of 13 September 1993, in which around 115 Kuki villagers, including women and children, were killed in the Tamenglong area and the erstwhile Senapati district. Kuki organisations attribute the killings to cadres of the NSCN (Isak-Muivah), an account the Naga group has not formally accepted. The KNO and Kuki civil society commemorate the period each year as Sahnit-Ni, or Black Day, and Kuki bodies have placed the toll for the 1992 to 1997 clashes at more than 1,000 Kuki dead and over 350 villages uprooted.

=== Formation in 1988 ===
The Kuki National Organisation and the Kuki National Army were founded on 24 February 1988, with the KNO functioning as the political organisation and the KNA as its armed wing. A separate body, the Kuki National Front (KNF), was formed on 18 May the same year. The earliest KNA cadres were trained inside Myanmar by the Kachin Independence Army under the command of Thangkholun Haokip. While the KNF made Kangpokpi its base, the KNO sought to operate across Kuki-inhabited regions of India and Myanmar, with the exception of Nagaland, where it deferred to other Kuki bodies.

== Ideology and aims ==
The KNO's stated objective is the realisation of Zale'n-gam, a proposed homeland encompassing Kuki-inhabited tracts in Manipur, parts of Assam, Mizoram and Nagaland, and the Kabaw Valley and adjoining hills of Myanmar's Sagaing Region and Chin State. In a 2022 interview with the Imphal Review of Arts and Politics, P. S. Haokip described the concept as one of freedom for the Kuki people in their own land, which he traced to the resistance of the Anglo-Kuki War of 1917 to 1919. Where full integration is not achievable, the KNO has argued for a Western Zale'n-gam within the Indian constitutional framework, articulated variously as a Kuki state, a Union Territory with a legislature, or a Territorial Council, alongside an Eastern Zale'n-gam within Myanmar.

Critics, including Meitei civil society bodies and some commentators, regard this territorial claim as incompatible with the overlapping claims of the Naga and Meitei communities and argue that it has contributed to cycles of ethnic conflict in the state.

== Structure and leadership ==
P. S. Haokip has held the presidency of the KNO and the title of supreme commander of the Kuki National Army since the founding. Seilen Haokip, the spokesperson, has represented the organisation in television interviews during the post-2023 violence, including a September 2024 interview with Karan Thapar for The Wire, in which he said he could not rule out that groups under the KNO banner had breached the ground rules of the SoO agreement.

The cabinet structure of the body, drawn from across its constituent armed groups, has included vice-presidents associated with "Eastern" and "Western" Zale'n-gam and secretaries for portfolios such as defence, education, intelligence and public relations.

=== Affiliated armed groups ===
At the time of the 2008 SoO agreement, eleven militant outfits were grouped under the KNO. By the period of the 2023 violence, reporting placed the figure higher when splinter and dormant factions were counted, with around 17 groups commonly described as being under the KNO and a further 8 under the United People's Front, for a combined total of about 25 SoO signatory groups.

The principal armed wing of the KNO is the Kuki National Army. Other groups reported as affiliated to the umbrella over time include:

- Hmar National Army (HNA)
- Kuki National Front (Military Council) (KNF-MC)
- Kuki National Front (Zogam) (KNF-Zogam)
- Kuki National Front (Samuel)
- Kuki Liberation Army (KLA)
- Kuki Revolutionary Army (KRA)
- Pakan Reunification Army
- United Konrem Revolutionary Army (UKRA)
- United Socialist Revolutionary Army (USRA)
- Zomi Revolutionary Front (ZRF)

The composition of the umbrella shifted after the 2010 Myanmar general election. Pressure from other Kuki organisations led to a process to separate the Indian and Myanmar components of the KNA, which was formally concluded at a demerger meeting held on 27 and 28 July 2013. The Myanmar component was renamed and is now generally referred to as the Kuki National Army-Burma, or KNA-B.

== Suspension of Operations agreement ==
A bilateral Suspension of Operations agreement was signed between the KNO and the Indian Army in 2005. The tripartite SoO that brought in the Manipur government was signed on 22 August 2008 and covered the Kuki-Zo militant groups grouped under the KNO and the United People's Front. It has been renewed periodically since. Its terms confine cadres to designated camps, place their weapons in monitored "double-locked" armouries, prohibit fresh recruitment and the operation of front organisations, and bar armed parades and the hoisting of flags.

The pact has drawn opposition from Meitei civil society. The Coordinating Committee on Manipur Integrity (COCOMI), a leading Meitei umbrella body, has repeatedly described it as a pact that legitimises armed groups and has pressed for its abrogation. On 10 March 2023, the cabinet headed by then chief minister N. Biren Singh announced its intention to withdraw the state from the agreement with the KNA and the Zomi Revolutionary Army, citing alleged involvement in poppy cultivation and the sheltering of undocumented migrants from Myanmar. The Manipur Assembly passed a resolution on 29 February 2024 calling for full abrogation, although the central government did not endorse the move and the agreement continued to be renewed.

Talks resumed in New Delhi in June 2025 between the Ministry of Home Affairs, the KNO and the United People's Front, focusing on revising the ground rules, consolidating and relocating SoO camps, surrendering weapons and reopening national highways disrupted by the conflict.

== Activity in Myanmar ==
By the account of the Indian Council of World Affairs, the KNA took part in around twenty armed engagements with the Tatmadaw between 1991 and 2013. After the 2021 coup, the KNA-B aligned with the anti-junta resistance. It joined a Kachin Independence Army offensive in October 2023 that captured the Aungja base in Sagaing Region, and KNA cadres took part in the seizure of a Tatmadaw post in Tamu Township in December 2023, fighting alongside local People's Defence Force units.

The KNA-B has clashed with the National Socialist Council of Nagaland (Isak-Muivah) in the border belt running through Tengnoupal district. R. S. Winson, an NSCN-IM officer, was killed in the Angko Ching range on 15 June 2024, a killing the Naga group attributed to KNA-B fighters. NSCN-IM has in turn accused Indian security forces of assisting the KNA-B against rival Naga and Meitei armed groups in Myanmar. In a press statement issued on 19 May 2024, the KNA-B, using the name KNO/KNA-B, rejected the allegation as baseless and said its stand was the restoration of democracy in Myanmar.

== Role in the 2023 Manipur conflict ==
Ethnic violence broke out in Manipur on 3 May 2023 between the Meitei and Kuki-Zo communities. According to government figures cited in November 2024, 258 people had been killed and about 60,000 displaced, with unofficial estimates higher. The conflict followed a dispute over the inclusion of the Meitei community in the list of Scheduled Tribes.

The role, if any, of the SoO groups in the violence has been a central dispute. Meitei organisations have alleged that KNO and UPF cadres left camp confinement to take part in attacks on Meitei villages and to assist Kuki "village volunteers". By mid-2025, the Union Ministry of Home Affairs had publicly referred to a small number of confirmed ground-rule violations, while Meitei bodies maintained the true figure was higher. Asked about the question, Seilen Haokip told The Wire in September 2024 that he could not say with confidence whether cadres affiliated with the KNO had breached the agreement.

The KNO and other Kuki-Zo bodies have attributed responsibility for the conflict to the state government under N. Biren Singh. They have cited the so-called Manipur tapes, a set of audio recordings made public in August 2024 by the Kuki Students' Organisation and reported by The Wire, in which a voice said to be Singh's is heard discussing the violence and referring to Kuki-Zo casualties. The Wire said it had not independently verified the voice. The recordings were submitted to a government-appointed commission of inquiry, and the matter came before the Supreme Court of India on a petition by a Kuki human rights body. The National Forensic Science Laboratory later told the court that the audio had been tampered with and was not scientifically fit for voice comparison, and the court ordered a fresh examination. Singh resigned as chief minister on 9 February 2025, and President's Rule was imposed in the state shortly afterwards.

=== Attacks on security forces ===
Between late December 2023 and mid-January 2024, suspected cadres of the KNA, the KNA-B and other Kuki outfits carried out a series of attacks on the Manipur Police, the Border Security Force and Indian Reserve Battalion personnel in Moreh, on the India–Myanmar border. A rocket-propelled grenade attack on a security forces position at Moreh on 2 January 2024 wounded at least seven personnel.

A separate ambush on 17 January 2024 killed police commandos and wounded others. The National Investigation Agency subsequently arrested several accused, including Kamginthang Gangte, identified as a member of the KNA, in 2025. The agency also investigated the killing of Sub-Divisional Police Officer Chingtham Anandakumar Singh, who was shot during an ambush at Moreh on 31 October 2023; the prime accused was arrested in April 2026.

== Allegations of criminal financing ==
=== Extortion ===
Indian security analysts and successive state governments in Manipur have identified extortion as a source of funds for KNO-affiliated groups, in line with practices attributed to other Manipuri insurgent outfits. A study by the Vivekananda International Foundation argues that several of the state's militant outfits have shifted over two decades away from their original framing and towards a model funded chiefly through extortion, arms smuggling and the narcotics trade. Practices reported in that study include levies on traders, contractors and infrastructure projects, and the operation of toll points along national highways connecting the Imphal Valley to the rest of India.

=== Narcotics allegations ===
A further set of allegations concerns the involvement of cadres affiliated with SoO groups in Manipur's opium poppy economy and in the cross-border heroin trade. The Vivekananda International Foundation study quotes an Imphal-based organisation alleging that Kuki militants in the hill areas had used the cover of the SoO to expand poppy cultivation and the drug trade, and identifies the KNO among the bodies whose cadres have been arrested in connection with drug seizures. State data on enforcement has shown that a large share of poppy cultivation destroyed between 2017 and 2023 lay in hill districts with substantial Kuki-Zo populations, although such district-level figures do not by themselves establish a link to any particular organisation.

This framing has been challenged. Reporting in Scroll.in has noted that the drug trade in Manipur cannot be reduced to a single community, since processing and trafficking networks are not communally homogenous. The newsroom Newsreel.asia has argued that the language of "narco-terrorism" has been directed at tribal cultivators rather than at the wholesalers and traffickers higher up the chain. Kuki bodies have described N. Biren Singh's "war on drugs" as a pretext for evicting tribal villages from forest land.

=== Allegations of recruiting minors ===
Indian state and rights bodies have alleged that armed groups in Manipur, including those affiliated with the KNO, have recruited children as combatants. The chairperson of the Manipur Commission for Protection of Child Rights, Keisham Pradeepkumar, said in 2024 that both Meitei and Kuki armed groups had inducted children and that the commission held records of cases involving child combatants. A November 2024 report by CNN-News18 cited unnamed central government sources alleging that Kuki groups were recruiting minors. The Hindu reported in January 2025 that rights bodies in Manipur had documented the use of children by armed groups on multiple sides of the conflict. The recruitment of children below the age of fifteen into armed forces, where established, would breach the Geneva Conventions of 1949.

== Relations with other groups ==
The KNO has long-standing operational and political ties with the Kachin Independence Organisation, whose army trained its first cadres, and wider links across Myanmar's ethnic armed organisations. Its posture towards the NSCN-IM has remained antagonistic since the 1990s clashes, and KNO spokespersons have repeatedly demanded that any settlement of the Naga peace process not encroach on territory claimed by the Kuki-Zo.

== Bibliography ==
- Arora, Vibha; Kipgen, Ngamjahao (2017), "Demand for Kukiland and Kuki ethnic nationalism", in Vibha Arora; N. Jayaram (eds.), Democratisation in the Himalayas: Interests, Conflicts, and Negotiations, Taylor & Francis, pp. 161–185, ISBN 9781351997997
- Haokip, T. S. Letkhosei (2018), Ethnicity and Insurgency in Myanmar/Burma: A Comparative Study of the Kuki-Chin and Karen Insurgencies, Educreation Publishing
- Haokip, Thongkholal (2023), "Home and Belonging in Northeast India", in Amit Ranjan; Diotima Chattoraj (eds.), Migration, Regional Autonomy, and Conflicts in Eastern South Asia: Searching for a Home(land), Springer Nature, ISBN 9783031287640
- Kipgen, Nehginpao (October–December 2011), "Ethnic Conflict in India: A Case Study of the Kukis and the Nagas in Manipur", The Indian Journal of Political Science, 72 (4): 1043–1060, JSTOR 41856539
- Kom, Ch. Sekholal (January–June 2011), "Militancy and Negotiations: A Study of Suspension of Operation in Manipur", Journal of Peace Studies, 18 (1–2): 70–81
- Tohring, S. R. (2010), Violence and Identity in North-east India: Naga-Kuki Conflict, Mittal Publications, ISBN 9788183243445
