= Prehistory of Manipur =

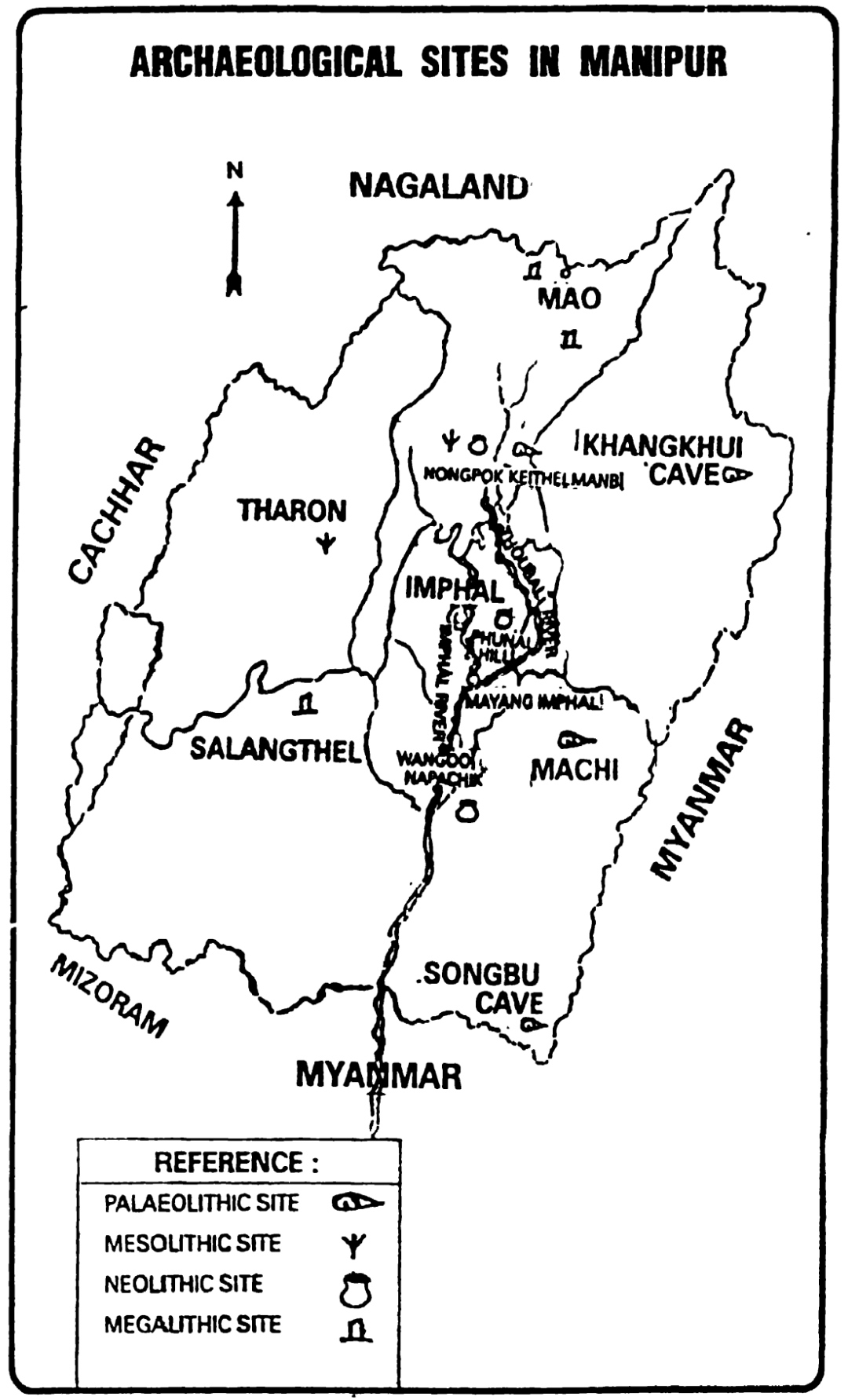
A map showing some of the most important archaeological sites discovered in Manipur

The prehistory of Manipur is the period of human history between the first use of stone tools by early men and the time just preceding ancient Kangleipak.

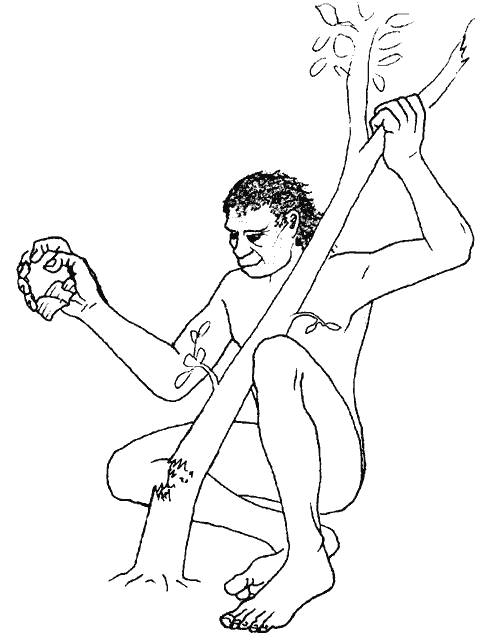

Comparing with other regions of the world, the development process of the archaeological work in Manipur is of recent times. Archaeological research in Northeast India is severely scarce, mostly limited to surface explorations, and lacking in state-of-the-art methods. The pioneering work in archeology was initiated by O. Kumar Singh. Before his presence, there was little information on the existence of the stone age culture of Manipur. O. Kumar Singh is of the view that "Pre-Historic people used to settle in the hills during the Paleolithic and Mesolithic (Hoabinhian) culture while Neolithic people lived in both hills and valley. They came down to the valley at least by about 2000 BC." On the basis of the characters of the tool industry, the prehistory of Manipur is broadly classified into three periods.

== Human settlement ==
Few attempts have been made to establish the earliest human settlement in Northeast India, and it is generally thought to have been uninhabited by archaic humans prior to late Pleistocene due to unfavorable geographical conditions. This, however, is disputed, and Northeast Corridors are proposed by some scholars to have played a defining role in early hominid migrations and peopling of India.

== Paleolithic period ==
Paleolithic period is the most primitive stone culture era. The Paleolithic period varies from place to place. In Manipur's neighbouring country Myanmar, the Lower Paleolithic culture started from 750000 to 275000 BP. Homo erectus began to settle on the banks of the Ayeyawaddy river in Burma in 750000 BCE. However, in case of Manipur, Paleolithic period started from 20,000 to 10,000 BCE.

Most scholars do not discuss a Paleolithic age in Manipur (and Northeast). However, Manjil Hazarika, in his 2017 survey of prehistory of Northeast India, rejects that there exists any plausible ground to deny presence of Paleolithic culture in Manipur.

A few Paleolithic sites (Khangkhui, Napachik, Machi, Somgu and Singtom) have been located in Manipur. Though, in absence of good chrono-stratigraphic context of the founds and their cohabitation with remains of other ages, accuracy of such identifications remains open to critiques. The existence of Hoabinhian-like complexes remains disputed, as well.

Evidence of Paleolithic habitation was discovered in five archeological sites, Songbu, Khangkhui, Machi, Nongpok Keithel Manbi and Singtom.

- Songbu cave - Discovered in 1983, the rock type was found to be of fine quartzite sandstone. Stone tools discovered here are of two types, core tools and flake tools. The quantity of the flake tools (77.7%) is much higher than those of core tools (22.2%). The period of the existence of the stone culture at Songbu cave is fixed at 20,000 BP, belonging to the Middle Paleolithic period. At the time of exploration, the nine types of artifacts discovered are: (1) Flake - 1, (2) Knife - 1, (3) Blade Hake - 3, (4) Point - 1, (5) Borer scrapper - 1, (6) Hand axe - 1, (7) Spilt pebbles - 1.
- Khangkhui cave - Located in Ukhrul district, the rock type found is of limestone Cretaceous origin. Discovered in 1969, there are four caves in the Khangkhui, two on the western slopes and two on the eastern slopes. Cave number 1 and 2 are on the western and number 3 and 4 on the eastern slopes. Numerous stalactites are found hanging on the roof of the cave. Exploratory work started in 1969-1972 but was abruptly stopped due to unfavorable circumstances. The tools discovered are of two types, limestone tools (96.4%) and sandstone tools (2.2%). Bone tools were significantly found in the cave no. 3, especially of Cervus, Sus and Bonvines. Though some suggest that the age of the earliest existence of the stone culture at the Khangkhui to be around 15,000 BC, T.C. Sharma opined it to be around 30,000 BCE, belonging to the Upper or Late Paleolithic period.
- Nongpok Keithelmanbi - Discovered the stone culture in 1982–1984, the Nongpok Keithelmanbi is an archeological site of Paleolithic period and post Paleolithic period (Mesolithic period). The exploration site was classified into Locality-1 (Mesolithic), Locality-2 (Paleolithic) and Locality-3 (Paleolithic). The site is estimated to be of Upper or Late Paleolithic period. Most artifacts are made of Quartzitic sandstone pebbles and few of chert.
- Singtom - Discovered in 1989 in Chandel district of Manipur, 16 stone tools relics are collected from the site. These are (1) hand axe, (2) work flat pebble with round edge, (3) flaked pebbles, (4) blade, (5) flake, (6) pebble striker, (7) split pebble, (8) waste flake. All these are made up of Quartzitic sandstone.
- Machi - Discovered in 1974 in Chandel district and Tengnoupal district of Manipur, this archeological site dates back to the period of early Stone Age and Lower Paleolithic period.

== Mesolithic period ==
The Mesolithic period is known from two remarkable archeological sites in Manipur. These are the Nongpok Keithelmanbi and the Tharon cave.

- Nongpok Keithelmanbi - The locality-1 out of the three localities (sections) of this site belongs to the Mesolithic period, while the others belong to the Paleolithic period. Most tools are made of the Quartzitic sandstone. Seventy-nine artifacts of Mesolithic period are discovered in this site. These are:- (1) Chisel edge pebble tools, (2) Round edge pebble tools, (3) Pebble pick, (4) Scrapper, (5) Blade, (6) Split pebble, (7) Pebble with batter marks, (8) Pebble with ground faces, (9) Flake and (10) Manu port. Approximate time dates back to 4460+-120 BP.
- Tharon cave - First exploration took place in 1979 by the State Archeology Department Government of Manipur, and again retaken in 1989, five caves were discovered so far. 39 Mesolithic artifacts were discovered. These are:- (1) Chopping tools, (2) Hand adze, (3) Hand axe, (4) Pointed tools, (5) Scrapper, (6) Edge ground knife, (7) Quern, (8) Grinder, (9) twenty-five unclassified ground pebbles.

== Neolithic period ==
Multiple Neolithic sites have been identified in Manipur; they include Nongpok Keithelmanbi, Napachik, Laimenai, Naran Siena, and Phunan.Considered to be part of a larger Southeast Asian complex, the identifications are primarily accorded on the basis of stone tools and pottery (esp. cord-impressed ware); characteristic cultural identifiers of the Neolithic (agriculture, animal rearing etc.) are yet to be located and their development chronology is subject of active research. Hazarika notes the Neolithic culture in Northeast to have begun some four thousand years after that in the Gangetic Plains.

Meiteilon, lingua-franca of Meiteis belongs to the Tibeto-Burman phylum. Hazarika notes the Manipuri sites to have an abundance of three-legged pottery and cord-impressed ware, very similar to the ones found in Southern China and Thailand, and hypothesizes that Manipur might have been the melting pot of Neolithic impulses from adjoining regions. Roger Blench, in agreement with George van Driem's reconstructions of archeo-linguistic history of Southeast Asia, proposes that Northeast India accommodated a diverse group of foragers since Neolithic age, who learned agriculture and animal rearing c. 4000 B.C before migrating eastwards and establishing the TB phylum.

The Neolithic period is the last of the three Stone Age periods. It has four archeological sites in Manipur. These are (1) Napachik, (2) Laimanai,> (3) Phuna (4) Nongpok Keithelmanbi.

- Napachik - Excavation discovered 116 artifacts of Neolithic period from the site in Wangoo village.
- Laimanai - Excavation started in 1990 and discovered many more than 70 stone artifacts of Neolithic period.
- Phunan - Discovered in October, 1967, though some artifacts of Neolithic period were discovered so far, there is no official excavation took place till now.
- Nongpok Keithelmanbi - Besides having the existence during the Paleolithic and Mesolithic periods, this site also houses stone artifacts of Neolithic period, including the corded wares and ill fired potteries.

== Chalcolithic and beyond ==
Hazarika notes the broader region to not show evidence of any significant cultural transformation, upon the dawning of Copper Age (and then, Iron Age). The state has an abundance of megaliths of various shapes, serving distinct purposes. Sometime before the Christian era, the valley got inhabited by distinct yeks (clans), who had probably migrated from Southern China during the late Iron Age. The hill-tribes are probably of indigenous origin.

== Bibliography ==
- Singh, Okram Kumar (1983). Napachik, a Stone Age Site in the Manipur Valley. State Archaeology, Government of Manipur.

== Other websites ==
- Devi, L. Kunjeswori (2003). Archaeology in Manipur. Rajesh Publications. ISBN 978-81-85891-18-7.
- Cord-impressed Pottery in Neolithic-Chalcolithic Context of Eastern
- Manipur South The Earliest Archaeological Site
- Digging up Manipur archaeological past interaction with OK Singh Part 1 and Part 2
- Mutua Bahadur's Art Collection
