= Tengnoupal district =

- District of Manipur
- Location in Manipur
- Interactive map of Tengnoupal district
- Coordinates: 24.384°N 94.145°E
- Country: India
- State: Manipur
- Headquarters: Tengnoupal

Area
  - Total: 1,213 km^{2} (468 sq mi)
  - Rank: 10

Population (2011)
  - Total: 59,110
  - Density: 48.73/km^{2} (126.2/sq mi)

Language(s)
  - Official: Manipuri (officially called Meiteilon) (Note: Manipuri language. Other regional languages of different places in Manipur may either be predominantly spoken or not in their respective places but "Meitei" is always officially used.)
  - Regional: Thadou
- Time zone: UTC+05:30 (IST)
- Website: https://tengnoupal.nic.in/

Tengnoupal district :/teŋ-nə́u-pəl/) is a district in Manipur, India. It is a district which was created in December 2016 by splitting the Chandel district.

The district headquarters have been relocated to Tengnoupal. In the 1960s and 1970s, Tengnoupal was the district headquarters, and it was shifted to Chandel in 1974. Tengnoupal district is geographically strategic for the installation of many government infrastructures.

== Sub-divisions ==
The sub-divisions in Tengnoupal district are:

- Tengnoupal
- Moreh
- Machi

== Demographics ==
Religions in Tengnoupal district (2011)
| Religion | Percent |
| Christianity | 84.18% |
| Hinduism | 10.01% |
| Islam | 4.28% |
| Other or not stated | 0.69% |

At the time of the 2011 census, Tengnoupal district had a population of 59,110. Tengnoupal had a sex ratio of 951 females per 1000 males. 28.50% of the population lived in urban areas. Scheduled Castes and Scheduled Tribes made up 0.78% and 83.81% of the population, respectively.

Languages of Tengnoupal district (2011)
1. Maring (34.0%)
2. Thadou (33.6%)
3. Manipuri (8.03%)
4. Kuki (2.83%)
5. Hindi (1.60%)
6. Tamil (1.53%)
7. Tangkhul (1.53%)
8. Zou (1.43%)
9. Vaiphei (1.34%)
10. Nepali (0.91%)
11. Others (13.2%)

At the time of the 2011 census, 34.05% of the population spoke Maring, 33.56% Thadou, 8.03% Manipuri, 2.83% Kuki, 1.60% Hindi, 1.53% Tamil, 1.53% Tangkhul, 1.43% Zou, 1.34% Vaiphei and 0.91% Nepali as their first language.

== History ==
The name "Tengnoupal district" was first used for the Chandel district. The Tengnoupal district was established in 1974. In 1983, the name of the district was changed to Chandel district, as the district headquarters were located in Chandel.

On 9 December 2016, the Okram Ibobi Singh-led Indian National Congress state government announced the creation of seven new districts, including the present-day Tengnoupal district, which was split from the Chandel district. Singh inaugurated the Tengnoupal district on 16 December, amid protests by the United Naga Council and attacks by rebels, while his supporters welcomed the decision. Singh refused to reconsider the decision, stating that the creation of the new districts would lead to faster development and administrative convenience.

== See also ==
- List of populated places in Tengnoupal district
