= Zou language =

Sino-Tibetan language of Burma and India

Zou
- Zo, Zouham, Zoham, Zokam
- 'Zo Lai' in Zolai alphabet
- Native to: Manipur, India
- Region: Tonzang: Chin State, Chin Hills; In India: Mizoram and Manipur, Chandel, Singngat subdivision and Sungnu area; Churachandpur districts; Assam.
- Ethnicity: Zou
- Native speakers: 88,000 (2012)
- Language family: Sino-Tibetan: Kuki-Chin languages; Northeastern Kuki-Chin languages; Zou
- Writing system: Latin, Zoulai alphabet

Language codes
- ISO 639-3: zom
- Glottolog: zouu1235
- ELP: Zome

Zou (also spelled Zo and known as Zoham or Zokam) is a language of the Northeastern branch of Kuki-Chin languages originating in western Burma and spoken also in Mizoram and Manipur in northeastern India.

The term Zou (or Zo) is sometimes used as a blanket term for the languages spoken by the Kuki-Chin-Mizo peoples.

== Phonology ==
The set of 23 Zou consonantal phonemes can be established on the basis of the following minimal pairs or overlapping words. Besides these 23 phonemes, one consonant is a borrowed phoneme (/r/), which is found only in loan words and in very rare cases (e.g., /r/ in /rəŋ/ "color"). Along with these consonants, Zou has 7 vowels: /i, e, a, ɔ, o, u, ə/.

Consonant Phonemes
		Labial	Dental/ Alveolar	Palatal	Velar	Glottal
Plosive	voiceless	p	t	c	k	ʔ
Plosive	aspirated	pʰ	tʰ		kʰ	ʔ
Plosive	voiced	b	d	ɟ	g	ʔ
Affricate				tʃ		
Fricative	voiceless	v	s			h
Fricative	voiced		z			
Nasal		m	n		ŋ	
Lateral			l			
Trill			(r)			
Semivowel		w		j		

Vowels
	Front	Central	Back
Close	i		u
Close-mid	e	ə	o
Open-mid		ə	ɔ
Open		a	

== Writing system ==
Zou is often written in a Latin script developed by Christian missionary J.H. Cope, listed below. In 1952, M. Siahzathang of Churachandpur created an alternative script known as Zolai or Zoulai, an alphabetic system with some alphasyllabic characteristics. Zou cultural, political, and literary organizations began to adopt the script starting in the 1970s, and the Manipur State Government subsequently showed support for both Siahzathang and the script.

=== Vowels ===
Letter	IPA
a	[a]
aw	[ɔ]
e	[e/ə]
i	[i~j]
o	[o]
u	[u~w]

=== Consonants ===
Letter	IPA
b	[b]
ch	[c]
d	[d]
g	[g]
h	[h], [ʔ] at the end of a syllable
j	[ɟ]
k	[k]
kh	[kʰ]
l	[l]
m	[m]
n	[n]
ng	[ŋ]
p	[p]
ph	[pʰ]
r	[r]
s	[s]
t	[t]
th	[tʰ]
v	[ʋ]
z	[z]

== Grammar ==
=== Verbs ===
Zou verbs can be classified into three types as given below: Stems 1, 2 and 3:

Types of Zou Verbs
Stem 1	Stem 2	Stem 3	Stem 4
piê-give	pie?	pe-	pieh
puo-carry	puo?	po-	pua-

=== Numbers ===
Zou numbers are counted as follows:

Numeral	Zou	English	Hindi
0	be̋m	zero	शून्य śūnya
1	khàt	one	एक ek
2	nì	two	दो do
3	thum	three	तीन tīn
4	li	four	चार cār
5	nga	five	पाँच pā̃c
6	gùh	six	छह chah
7	sagí	seven	सात sāt
8	giét	eight	आठ āṭh
9	kuó	nine	नौ nau
10	sàwm, sôm	ten	दस das
11	sàwm leh khàt	eleven	ग्यारह gyārah
12	sàwm leh nì	twelve	बारह bārah
13	sàwm leh thum	thirteen	तेरह terah
14	sàwm leh li	fourteen	चौदह caudah
15	sàwm leh nga	fifteen	पंद्रह pandrah
16	sàwm leh gùh	sixteen	सोलह solah
17	sàwm leh sagí	seventeen	सत्रह satrah
18	sàwm leh giét	eighteen	अठारह aṭhārah
19	sàwm leh kuó	nineteen	उन्नीस unnīs
20	sàwmnì	twenty	बीस bīs
30	sàwmthum	thirty	तीस tīs
40	sàwmli	forty	चालीस cālīs
50	sàwmnga	fifty	पचास pacās
60	sàwmgùh	sixty	साठ sāṭh
70	sàwmsagí	seventy	सत्तर sattar
80	sàwmgiét	eighty	अस्सी assī
90	sàwmkuò	ninety	नव्वे navve
100	zȁ	hundred	सौ sau
1,000	sa̋ng, tȕl	one thousand	हज़ार hazār
10,000	si̋ng, tȕlsàwm, sa̋ngsàwm	ten thousand	दस हज़ार das hazār
100,000	nuòi, tȕlzà, sa̋ngzà	one hundred thousand, one lakh	लाख lākh
1,000,000	nuòisàwm, sa̋ngtȕl, tȕltȕl	one million	दस लाख das lākh
10,000,000	thȅn, vâibêlsié, kráwl	ten million	करोड़ karoṛ
100,000,000	thȅnzà, kráwl sàwm	one hundred million	दस करोड़ das karoṛ

== Linguistic relations ==
Within the Northeastern Kuki-Chin languages, Zou is closely related to Central languages such as Duhlian (Lusei/Lushai) or the Mizo language (endonym: Mizo ṭawng), which serves as the lingua franca of Mizoram.

The variety of Zou spoken in India is similar to the Paite language of the Paite people, although Zou lacks the word-final glottal stops present in Paite.

== Geographical extent ==
The geographic area covered by the language group spans approximately 60,000 square miles (160,000 km^{2}) across Burma, India, and Bangladesh. However, political boundaries and debates have sometimes obscured the exact extent of this area in various sources.

=== In Burma ===
The language is spoken in Chin State, Tiddim, and the Chin Hills. The use of Burmese has increased in Zou-speaking areas of Chin State since the 1950s. Ethnologue reports that Zou is spoken in the following townships of Myanmar:

- Chin State: Tonzang, Hakha, and Tedim townships
- Sagaing Division: Kalay, Khampat, and Tamu townships

=== In India ===
- Manipur
  - Chandel district: Singngat subdivision and the Sungnu Sachih / Kana area
  - Churachandpur district
- Mizoram
- Assam

=== In Bangladesh ===
In Bangladesh, it is spoken by the Bawm people.
