= Northeastern Kuki-Chin languages =

Sino-Tibetan languages spoken in Myanmar and Northeast India

Northeastern Kuki-Chin
- Northern Kuki-Chin; Northern Chin
- Geographic distribution: Myanmar and Northeast India
- Linguistic classification: Sino-Tibetan: Tibeto-Burman; Central Tibeto-Burman (?); Kuki-Chin–Naga; Kuki-Chin; Northeastern Kuki-Chin

Language codes
- Glottolog: nort3179 (Northeastern Kuki-Chin)

Northeastern Kuki-Chin is a branch of Kuki-Chin languages. It was formerly called Northern Kuki-Chin, but renamed to distinguish it from the Northwestern Kuki-Chin languages. VanBik also calls the branch Northern Chin or Zo.

These languages are spoken in northern parts of Chin State in Myanmar, and various parts of Northeast India, most notably in the state of Manipur.

== Languages ==
VanBik (2009) includes the following languages as Northern Kuki-Chin languages. The positions of Ngawn and Ralte are not addressed by VanBik (2009), but they are classified as Northern Kuki-Chin in Glottolog.

- Thado (Kuki)
- Tedim
- Paite
- Gangte
- Simte
- Chiru
- Sizang
- Ralte
- Vaiphei
- Zou
- Ngawn

Tedim is the local lingua franca of northern Chin State, Myanmar, while Paite (also known as Zokam) is the local lingua franca of some parts of Churachandpur Town while Thadou is the lingua franca of most of the areas inhabited by the non-Nagas of Manipur.

== Classification ==
VanBik divides the Northern Kuki-Chin branch into two major language clusters, namely the Thado cluster and Sizang cluster.

- Thado cluster: Thado/Kuki, Tedim, Khuangsai, Paite, Vuite
- Sizang cluster: Sizang/Siyin, Guite/Nguite, Vaiphei, Zou

== Sound changes ==
VanBik (2009) lists the following sound changes from Proto-Kuki-Chin to Proto-Northern Chin.

- Proto-Kuki-Chin *-r > Proto-Northern Chin *-k
- Proto-Kuki-Chin * θ- > Proto-Northern Chin *ts-
- Proto-Kuki-Chin *kl- > Proto-Northern Chin *tl-

== Bibliography ==
- Button, Christopher (2011). Proto Northern Chin. STEDT Monograph. Vol. 10. ISBN 0-944613-49-7. OCLC 1013268663.
- Dal Sian Pau, S. (2014). The comparative study of Proto-Zomi (Kuki-Chin) languages. Lamka, Manipur, India: Zomi Language & Literature Society. – Comparative word list of Paite, Simte, Thangkhal, Zou, Kom, Tedim, and Vaiphei]
- Peterson, David A. (2017). "On Kuki-Chin subgrouping". In Ding, Picus Sizhi; Pelkey, Jamin (eds.). Sociohistorical linguistics in Southeast Asia: New horizons for Tibeto-Burman studies in honor of David Bradley. Leiden: Brill. pp. 189–209. doi:10.1163/9789004350519_012. ISBN 978-90-04-34983-4.
- VanBik, Kenneth (2009). Proto-Kuki-Chin: A Reconstructed Ancestor of the Kuki-Chin Languages (PDF). STEDT Monograph. Vol. 8. ISBN 0-944613-47-0.
