= Ralte language =

Mizo language of India

Ralte
- Region: India
- Ethnicity: 34,000 Ralte, Mizo
- Native speakers: 900 (2007)
- Language family: Sino-Tibetan: (Tibeto-Burman); Kuki-Chin; Northeastern; Ralte

Language codes
- ISO 639-3: ral
- Glottolog: ralt1242

Ralte is a Kuki-Chin language of India. Fewer than a thousand Ralte people speak the language.

== Geographical distribution ==
Ralte is spoken in the following locations (Ethnologue).

- Mizoram (mainly Aizawl district, and also scattered in Lunglei district and Chhimtuipui district)
- Manipur
- Jampui Hills, North Tripura district, Tripura

== Vocabulary ==
Below are comparative Swadesh lists of Ralte, Mizo, and Tedim from Otsuka (2016).

No.	Gloss	Ralte	Tedim	Mizo
1.	I	kei˩	kei˩˥	kei˩˥
2.	thou	naŋ˩	naŋ˩˥	naŋ˩˥
3.	he	a˩maʔ˥	a˥maʔ˩	a˥maʔ˩
4.	we	kei˩muʔ˥	kou˥˩	kei˩nī˥˩
5.	you	naŋ˩muʔ˥	nou˥˩	naŋ˩nī˥˩
6.	they	a˩muʔ˥	a˥māu˥˩	an˩nī˥˩
7.	this	hī˩hiʔ˥	hiʔ˥	hei˥˩hi˥
8.	that	tou˩˥hiʔ˩	tuaʔ˥	kʰā˥˩kʰa˥
9.	here	hi˩tou˥˩vaʔ˩	hiaʔ˥	he˥taʔ˩
10.	there	tou˥˩vaʔ˩	huaʔ˥	so˥taʔ˩
11.	who	kū˩˥hā˩˥	kua˥˩	tu˩ŋē˥˩
12.	what	ī˩˥hā˩˥	baŋ˥˩	e˩ŋē˥˩
13.	where	kʰoi˥˩aʔ˩hā˩˥	koi˩˥aʔ˩	kʰoi˥˩aʔ˩ŋē˥˩
14.	when	ī˩˥tik˩lāi˥˩	cik˩ciaŋ˥˩	eŋ˩tik˩lāi˥
15.	how	ī˩tin˥˩hā˩˥	baŋ˥˩cī˩	eŋ˩tin˥ŋē˥˩
16.	not	ou˥˩	lou˥˩	lou˩
17.	all	a˩rēŋ˩in˥˩	a˩vek˥pī˩˥	a˩vāi˩˥
18.	many	tam˩	tam˩˥	tam˩˥
19.	some	a˩kʰen˥˩	pōl˧xat˥	a˩ṭʰen˥
20.	few	tōm˥˩	tōm˧	tlēm˥
21.	other	daŋ˩	daŋ˩˥	daŋ˩˥
22.	one	pa˩kʰat˥	xat˩	pa˩kʰat˩
23.	two	pa˩niʔ˥	niʔ˩	pa˩n̥niʔ˩
24.	three	pa˩tʰum˥˩	tʰum˧	pa˩tʰum˥
25.	four	pa˩lī˥˩	lī˧	pa˩lī˥
26.	five	pa˩ŋā˥˩	ŋā˧	pa˩ŋā˥
27.	big	lian˩˥	lian˥˩	lian˩
28.	long	sāu˩	sāu˩˥	sei˥
29.	wide	zāu˥˩	zai˩˥	zāu˥
30.	thick	saʔ˩	saʔ˩	cʰaʔ˩
31.	heavy	hit˩	ɡik˩	rit˩
32.	small	nēu˩	nēu˩˥	tē˩˥
33.	short	tōi˩	tom˩˥	tōi˩˥
34.	narrow	zīm˥˩	toi˩˥	zīm˥
35.	thin	pan˥˩	pā˩˥	pan˥
36.	woman	mei˩˥sia˩	nu˩mei˩	m̥mei˩cʰia˥˩
37.	man	pa˩sal˩	pa˩sal˩˥	mi˩pā˩
38.	human	mi˩hiŋ˥˩	mi˥hiŋ˧	mi˩ɕiŋ˥
39.	child	nau˥˩paŋ˩	nāu˧paŋ˩˥	nau˥paŋ˩˥
40.	wife	zī˥˩	zī˧	nu˩pui˩˥
41.	husband	pa˩sal˩	pa˩sal˩˥	pa˩sal˩˥
42.	mother	nū˩	nū˩˥	nū˥˩
43.	father	pā˩	pā˩˥	pā˥˩
44.	animal	ham˥˩sā˩	ɡam˧sā˩˥	ram˥sā˥˩
45.	fish	sa˩ŋā˩	ŋa˥sā˩˥	sa˩ŋ̊ŋā˥˩
46.	bird	sa˩vā˩	va˥sā˩˥	sa˩vā˥˩
47.	dog	ui˩	ui˩˥	ui˩˥
48.	louse	hik˩	hik˩	ɕik˩
49.	snake	hūl˥˩	ɡūl˧	rūl˥
50.	worm	caŋ˥˩pāt˩	luŋ˩˥	caŋ˥pāt˩˥
51.	tree	tʰiŋ˩	siŋ˩˥	tʰiŋ˩˥
52.	forest	ham˥˩nuai˩	ɡam˧lak˥	ram˥n̥nuai˩˥
53.	stick	tiaŋ˩	ciaŋ˩˥xut˩	tiaŋ˩˥
54.	fruit	haʔ˥	ɡaʔ˩	raʔ˩
55.	seed	cī˩	xāi˥˩cī˩˥	tʰlāi˩cī˥˩
56.	leaf	naʔ˩	teʔ˩	n̥naʔ˩
57.	root	zuŋ˩	zuŋ˩˥	zuŋ˩˥
58.	bark	tʰiŋ˩hōŋ˥˩	siŋ˩˥hōŋ˧	tʰiŋ˩hōŋ˥
59.	flower	pāk˥˩	pāk˧	paŋ˩pār˥
60.	grass	kiak˩	lou˧pā˩˥, kiak˩˥	l̥lo˥bet˩
61.	rope	kʰāu˥˩	xāu˧	ɕui˩zēn˥
62.	skin	vun˩	vun˩˥	vun˩˥
63.	meat	sā˩	sā˩˥	sā˥˩
64.	blood	tʰī˩	sī˩˥	tʰī˩˥
65.	bone	huʔ˩	ɡuʔ˩	ruʔ˩
66.	fat	sa˩tʰāu˩˥	sa˥tʰāu˥˩	sa˩ɕiak˥˩
67.	egg	tui˥˩	tūi˧	tui˥
68.	horn	kī˩	kī˩˥	kī˥˩
69.	tail	mei˩	mei˩˥	mei˩˥
70.	feather	mul˩	mul˩˥	m̥mul˩˥
71.	hair	sam˩	sam˩˥	sam˩˥
72.	head	lū˥˩	lū˧	lū˥
73.	ear	beŋ˥˩	bil˩˥	beŋ˥
74.	eye	mit˩	mit˩	mit˩
75.	nose	nāk˩˥	nāk˥˩	n̥nār˥
76.	mouth	kam˥˩	kam˧	kā˥
77.	teeth	hā˥˩	hā˧	hā˥
78.	tongue	lei˥˩	lei˧	lei˥
79.	nail	tin˩	cin˩˥	tin˩˥
80.	foot	kēŋ˩pʰaʔ˥	xe˩pēk˩˥	ke˩pʰaʔ˩
81.	leg	kēŋ˩	xē˥˩	kē˩
82.	knee	kʰūp˩	xūk˩˥	kʰūp˥˩
83.	hand	kʰut˩	xut˩	kut˩
84.	wing	tʰā˩˥	xā˥˩	tʰlā˩
85.	belly	dul˩˥	ɡil˧pī˩˥	dul˩
86.	guts	hil˥˩	ɡil˧	rīl˥
87.	neck	ŋōŋ˥˩	ŋōŋ˧	ŋ̊ŋōŋ˥
88.	back	nuŋ˥˩zāŋ˥˩	nuŋ˧zāŋ˧	n̥nuŋ˥zāŋ˥
89.	breast	nōi˩	nōi˩˥	n̥nu˩tē˩˥
90.	heart	luŋ˥˩	luŋ˧	luŋ˥
91.	liver	tʰin˩˥	sin˥˩	tʰin˩
92.	to drink	nē˩	dōn˧	in˥
93.	to eat	cā˩	nē˩˥	ei˥
94.	to bite	pet˩	pet˩	seʔ˩
95.	to suck	cōp˥˩	tōp˩˥	fōp˥˩
96.	to spit	sia˥˩	sia˩˥	cʰāk˥˩
97.	to vomit	luak˩	lua˥˩	luak˥˩
98.	to blow	sēm˥˩	mūt˧	cʰēm˥
99.	to breathe	tʰō˩	nāk˧	tʰō˥˩
100.	to laugh	nī˥˩	nūi˧	nui˥
101.	to see	mū˩˥	mū˥˩	m̥mū˩
102.	to hear	tʰei˩˥	zā˩˥	ɕia˩˥
103.	to know	tʰei˩˥	tʰei˥˩	ɕia˩˥
104.	to think	ŋaiʔ˩tuaʔ˩	ŋaiʔ˩sun˥˩	ŋaiʔ˩tuaʔ˩
105.	to smell	nam˩˥	nam˥˩	n̥nīm˩
106.	to fear	lāu˩	lāu˩˥	l̥lāu˩˥
107.	to sleep	ip˩	iʔ˩mū˧	mū˥
108.	to live	hiŋ˥˩	hiŋ˧	ɕiŋ˥
109.	to die	tʰī˥˩	sī˧	tʰī˥
110.	to kill	tʰat˩	tʰat˩	tʰat˩
111.	to fight	thawh˥˩	lāi˩˥, ki˩sual˩˥	sual˥
112.	to hunt	ham˥˩ suak˥˩	ɡam˧ vāk˩˥	ram˥ vāk˥˩, ram˥ cʰuak˥˩
113.	to hit	vua˩˥	vua˥˩	vua˩
114.	to cut	tan˩	tan˩˥	tan˩˥
115.	to split	tʰēr˩	bāl˩˥kēk˩˥	tʰlēr˩˥
116.	to stab	sun˩˥	sun˥˩	cʰun˩
117.	to scratch	hiat˩	xuat˩˥	hiat˥˩
118.	to dig	lāi˩˥	tou˩˥	lāi˩, cou˩˥
119.	to swim	tui˩˥ leuʔ˩	tūi˩˥ pēk˧	tui˩˥ l̥leuʔ˩
120.	to fly	lēŋ˥˩	lēŋ˧	tʰlōk˥˩
121.	to walk	lēŋ˥˩	lam˩˥ siau˥˩	lēŋ˥
122.	to come	hoŋ˩ kel˥˩	oŋ˩˥ pai˧	lo˩ kal˥
123.	to lie	lum˩˥	lum˥˩	lum˩
124.	to sit	kʰuŋ˥˩	tū˧	ṭhū˥
125.	to stand	diŋ˥˩	diŋ˧	diŋ˥
126.	to turn	vik˩	pei˩˥	vir˩˥
127.	to fall	tā˩˥	kia˥˩	tlā˩
128.	to give	pia˩	pia˩˥	pē˩
129.	to have	nei˩˥	nei˥˩	nei˩
130.	to squeeze	hekˀ˩	sūk˧	herˀ˩
131.	to rub	nōt˩	nōt˩˥	nōt˥˩
132.	to wash	sil˩˥	sil˩˥	sil˩
133.	to wipe	sōp˩	sōp˩˥	ɕū˩
134.	to pull	bot˩	kāi˥˩	pot˩
135.	to push	sōn˩	sōn˩˥	nam˩˥
136.	to throw	dēŋ˥˩	dēŋ˧	paiʔ˩
137.	to tie	kanʔ˩	hēn˧	suiʔ˩
138.	to sew	kʰui˥˩	xū˧	ṭʰui˥
139.	to count	siar˥˩	sim˧	cʰiar˥
140.	to say	soi˩	ɡēn˩˥	soi˩˥
141.	to sing	sā˩˥	sā˥˩	zāi˥
142.	to play practical jokes	ciam˩˥niʔ˩dūn˩˥	ki˩ciam˥˩nui˩˥	in˩fiam˥
143.	to float	lāŋ˥˩	lām˧	lāŋ˥
144.	to flow	luaŋ˥˩	luaŋ˧	luaŋ˥
145.	to freeze	kʰaŋ˩	xal˥˩	kʰaŋ˥˩
146.	to swell	vūŋ˥˩	bōk˧	vūŋ˥
147.	sun	nī˥˩	nī˧	nī˥
148.	moon	tʰā˩˥	xā˥˩	tʰlā˩
149.	star	āk˥˩sī˩˥	āk˧sī˥˩	ar˥sī˩
150.	water	tui˩	tūi˩˥	tui˩˥
151.	rain	huaʔ˩	ɡuaʔ˩	ruaʔ˩
152.	river	lui˩˥	lūi˥˩	lui˩
153.	lake	dīl˩	tūi˩˥lī˧	dīl˩˥
154.	sea	tui˩fin˩riat˩	tūi˩˥pī˥	tui˩fin˥˩riat˥˩
155.	salt	cī˩˥	cī˥˩	cī˩
156.	stone	suaŋ˩	suaŋ˩˥	luŋ˩˥
157.	sand	tiau˥˩	seʔ˩nēl˩˥	tiau˥
158.	dust	vāi˥˩vut˩	lei˩˥vui˧	vai˥vut˩
159.	earth	lei˩	lei˩˥	lei˩˥
160.	cloud	sūm˩	mei˧	cʰūm˩˥
161.	fog	ro˩˥mei˩	xo˥mui˧	ro˩mei˩˥
162.	sky	vān˩˥	vān˥˩	vān˩
163.	wind	tʰī˥˩	huiʔ˩	tʰlī˥
164.	snow	vūk˥˩	vūk˧	vūr˥
165.	ice	vūk˩kʰal˩	tūi˩˥xal˥˩	vūr˥kʰal˥˩
166.	smoke	mei˩kʰū˩	mei˩˥xū˩˥	mei˩kʰū˥˩
167.	fire	mei˩	mei˩˥	mei˩˥
168.	ash	vāp˩	vut˩	vāp˩˥
169.	to burn	kāŋ˩˥	kāŋ˥˩	kāŋ˩
170.	road	lam˩pui˩	lam˩˥	koŋ˥
171.	mountain	tāŋ˥˩	mual˧	tlāŋ˥
172.	red	san˥˩	san˧	sen˥
173.	green	hiŋ˥˩	eŋ˧	ɕiŋ˥
174.	yellow	eŋ˥˩	nāi˧pāk˧	eŋ˥
175.	white	vāk˥˩	kāŋ˧	vār˥
176.	black	dum˥˩	vom˧	dum˥
177.	night	zān˩˥	zān˥˩	zān˩
178.	day	nī˥˩	nī˧	nī˥
179.	year	kum˩˥	kum˥˩	kum˩
180.	warm	lum˥˩	lum˧	lum˥
181.	cold	dāi˩˥	vot˩	vōt˥˩
182.	full	dim˩	dim˩˥	kʰat˩
183.	new	tʰar˥˩	tʰak˥	tʰar˥
184.	old	lui˥˩	lui˧	hlui˥
185.	good	pʰā˩˥	hoiʔ˩	ṭʰā˩
186.	bad	sual˩	sia˩˥	sual˩˥
187.	rotten	muat˩	muat˩˥	ṭoiʔ˩
188.	dirty	bolˀ˩loʔ˩	nīn˥˩	bolˀ˩l̥loʔ˩
189.	straight	ŋīl˥˩	taŋ˧	ŋīl˥
190.	round	bial˥˩	bēm˩˥	bial˥
191.	sharp	hiam˥˩	hiam˧	ɕiam˥
192.	dull	bil˩	mōl˩˥	bil˩˥
193.	smooth	nāl˩	nāl˩˥	nāl˩˥
194.	wet	nom˥˩	kōt˩˥	huʔ˩
195.	dry	kou˥˩	keu˧	rou˥
196.	correct	dik˩	mān˧, dik˩	dik˩
197.	near	nāi˩	nāi˩˥	n̥nāi˩˥
198.	far	lam˩lā˩	ɡam˧lā˩˥	l̥lā˥
199.	right	tak˩lam˩	tak˩lam˩˥	a˩diŋ˩˥lam˩˥
200.	left	a˩vei˩lam˩	vei˩˥lam˩˥	a˩vei˩˥lam˩˥
201.	at	aʔ˩	aʔ˩	aʔ˩
202.	in	aʔ˩	aʔ˩	aʔ˩
203.	with	tuah˩	toʔ˩	nēn˩
204.	and	leʔ˩	leʔ˩	leʔ˩
205.	if	cʰun˥˩	leʔ˩	cʰuan˥
206.	because	a˩vāŋ˩in˥˩	a˥hiʔ˩ciaŋ˩˥in˧	a˥vāŋ˩in˥
207.	name	miŋ˥˩	min˧	m̥miŋ˥
