= Hrangkhol language =

Kuki-Chin language spoken in India and Burma

Hrangkhol
- Hrangkhawl
- Native to: India and Burma
- Region: Tripura, southeast Manipur, parts of Assam
- Native speakers: (19,000 cited 2000)
- Language family: Sino-Tibetan: Tibeto-Burman; Central Tibeto-Burman (?); Kuki-Chin-Naga; Kuki-Chin; Central; Hmar; Hrangkhol

Language codes
- ISO 639-3: hra
- Glottolog: hran1239

Hrangkhol, Hrangkhawl belongs to the Mizo languages spoken by the Hrangkhawl people mainly in Assam and Tripura states in India, with a minority living in Manipur and Mizoram. It is closely related with Khawsak dialect/Literary Kukis because, as each of the 20+ Kukis subtribes had their own dialect, over time they developed a lingua-franca, a common language for them all which today is known as "Khawsak țawng/Kukis țawng".

== Phonology ==
=== Vowels ===
	Front	Central	Back
Open	i		u
Mid	e	ə	o
Close		a	

All monophthongs occur in initial, medial, and final positions. Hrangkhol also has five diphthongs, /ai/, /ei/, /əi/, /oi/, and /ui/. /ui/ and /ai/ occur in all positions, while /ei/, /əi/, and /oi/ only occur in medial and final positions.

=== Consonants ===
		Labial	Alveolar	Palatal	Velar	Glottal
Nasal		m	n		ŋ	
Plosive/ Affricate	aspirated	pʰ	tʰ		kʰ	
Plosive/ Affricate	voiceless	p	t	t͡ʃ	k	
Plosive/ Affricate	voiced	b	d		g	
Fricative	voiceless		s			h
Fricative	voiced	v	z			
Trill			r			
Approximant			l		w	

All consonants occur in initial and medial positions, however only /p/, /t/, /k/, /r/, /l/, /m/, /n/, and /ŋ/ can occur as a coda. Hrangkhol also has stop-liquid clusters in syllable initial positions such as in klek "noise", and rtai "run". Consonant sequences between syllabic boundaries are also common, typically occurring in medial positions.

=== Tone ===
Hrangkhol distinguishes between high and low tones, which are marked with an acute and a grave respectively.
