= Tuipi Mate =

Tuipi Mate village is one of the Mate chiefship villages situated on National Highway No.102 in between Tengnoupal (Mate) village and K.Zalenmuol (Mate) village on the way to Moreh, India. It is in the Tengnoupal tehsil of Chandel district of Manipur state of India.

The Government of India recognised the identity and distinctiveness of the Mate community recently by the Constitution (Scheduled Tribes) Order, 1950 Amendment Bil: 2011 as a Scheduled Tribe of Manipur Vide the Government of India, Extra-Ordinary Gazette Notification No.02 of 2012.
