= Bible translations into Sanskrit =

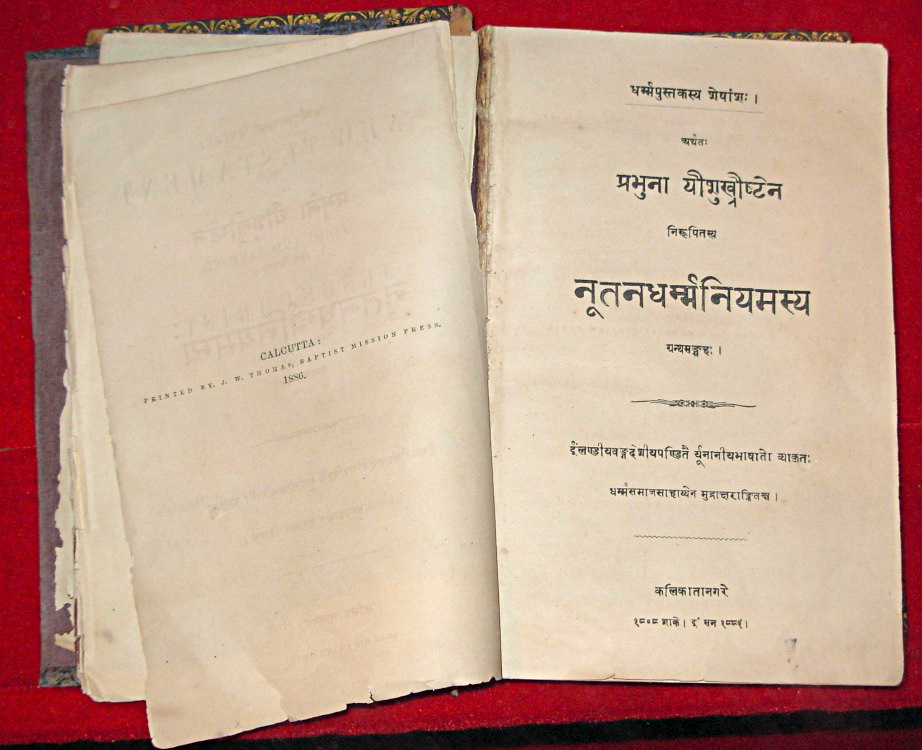
Sanskrit (Indian Vedic language) Bible printed in Calcutta (Kolkata), India, in 1886.

Translation of the Bible into Sanskrit is among the first wave of Bible translations into Indian languages.

== History ==
Translation work of the Bible into Sanskrit was undertaken by William Carey soon after his arrival in India as a missionary. He had the conviction that a Sanskrit Bible would be an ideal medium to communicate with the intellectual mass of India. He also believed that a Sanskrit Bible would serve as a basis for translating the Bible into other Indian vernacular languages. He was greatly aided by native Sanskrit pandits in this endeavour. The texts were translated from the original Greek and Hebrew.

The New Testament was published at the Baptist Missionary Press in Calcutta in 1808, and the Old Testament in four volumes followed in 1818.

Translation	John (यीहनः) 3:16
नूतनधर्म्मनियमः	ईश्वर इत्थं जगददयत यत् स्वमद्वितीयं तनयं प्राददात् ततो यः कश्चित् तस्मिन् विश्वसिष्यति सोऽविनाश्यः सन् अनन्तायुः प्राप्स्यति।

== Current status ==
Though the Calcutta Baptist Missionaries brought out the Bible in the Sanskrit language with great enthusiasm and expectation, their efforts gained little traction, partly because of the influx of Bible translations in the vernacular languages also issuing from the presses. Even though there were some revisions to the text, the Sanskrit Bible remains as a purely academic endeavour and is no longer in active circulation. There were hardly any major revisions to those translations, and physical copies of the original volumes are today available only in the archives of a few Western libraries. The Krishnapuram Palace in Kerala is also reported to be in possession of a copy of the Sanskrit Bible.

The Bible Society of India still publishes a version of the New Testament in Sanskrit. The digitised copies of the Sanskrit Bible (both the New Testament and the four volumes of the Old Testament) are available at archive.org

== Online version ==
With the objective of reviewing the Sanskrit Bible and making it freely available online: SanskritBible.in.

The project relies on volunteers to encode the Sanskrit text into Devanagari script based on the digitized copies of the Sanskrit Bible published by the Calcutta Baptist Missionaries. The site has also stated the revision of the Sanskrit Bible texts as one of its objectives. The transcription of the New Testament is currently being undertaken.
