= Gangte people =

Ethnic group in Asia

Gangte
Gangte-te
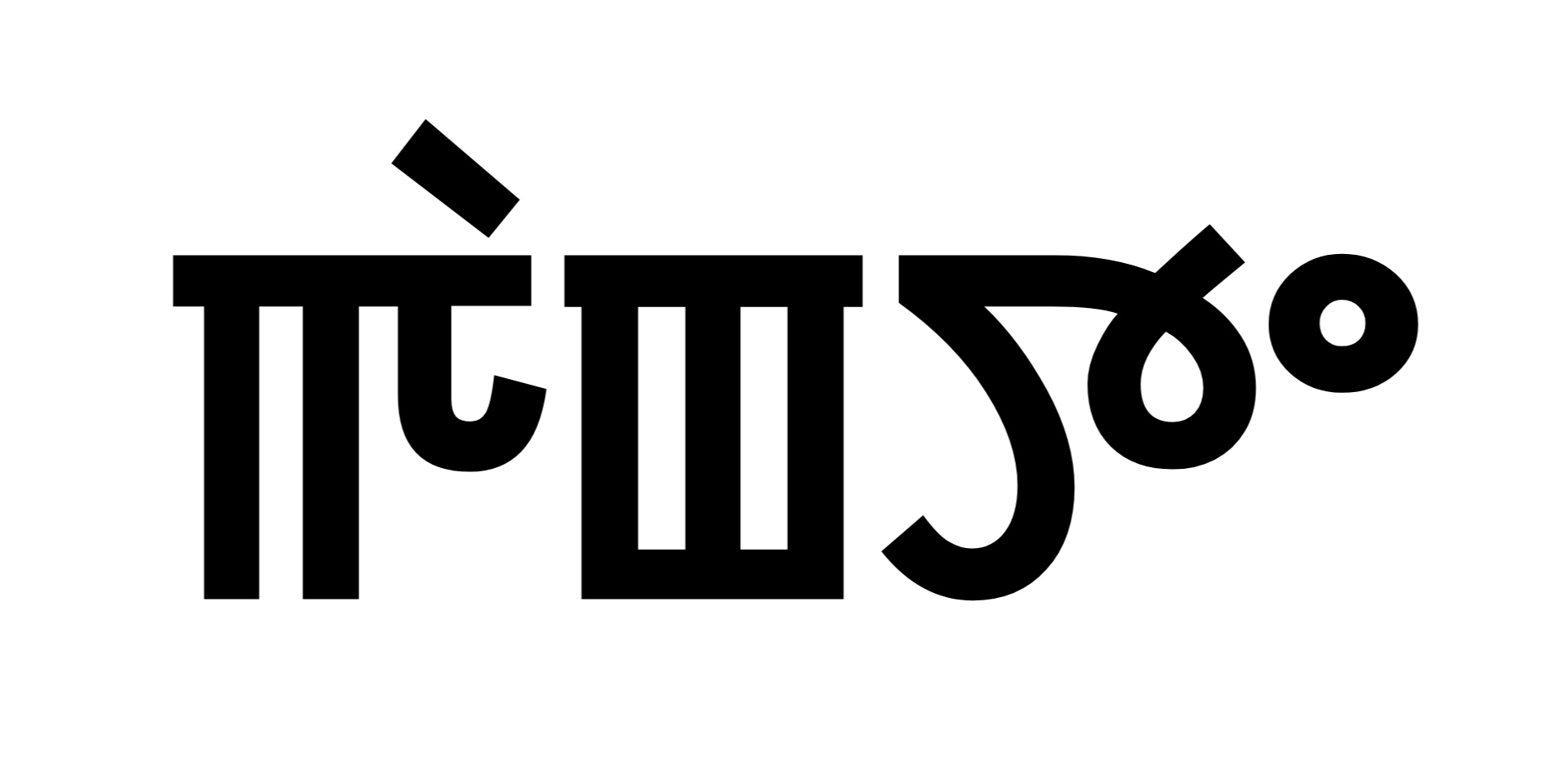
- The term "Gangte" written in Manipuri script (Meitei script)

Total population
- 16,500 (2011 census)

Regions with significant populations
- Northeast India, Bangladesh, Myanmar

Languages
- Gangte language (L1); Meitei language (L2)

Religion
- Christianity (majority), animism (traditionally)

Related ethnic groups
- Meitei · Thadou · Hmar · Mizo · Simte · Vaiphei · Zou · Paite

The Gangte people are a Zomi ethnic group residing predominantly in the Indian state of Manipur, as well as in parts of Mizoram, Assam, Tripura and neighboring Myanmar. The Gangte are recognized as a tribe in both Manipur and under the Indian Constitution. They primarily use the Gangte language as their first language (L1) and Meitei as their second language (L2).

== Naming system ==
The Gangtes use a distinct naming system to preserve their history and ancestry, especially given the absence of written records. Grandparents name their grandchildren using the last syllable of their own names—e.g., Thangmang leads to Manglun, which becomes Lunkholal, which turns into Lalminlun, etc. Grandfathers name grandsons and grandmothers name granddaughters. The firstborn son and daughter typically are named after the paternal grandparents, while the secondborn children are named after the maternal grandparents. This system is prevalent among many of the Zo peoples.
