= Paite language =

Sino-Tibetan language spoken in India and Myanmar

Paite
- Paite
- Native to: India, Myanmar
- Region: Manipur, Mizoram, Assam, Chin State
- Ethnicity: Paite
- Native speakers: 100,000 (80,000 in India)
- Language family: Sino-Tibetan: Tibeto-Burman; Central Tibeto-Burman (?); Kuki-Chin–Naga; Kuki-Chin; Northeastern; Paite
- Writing system: Latin

Language codes
- ISO 639-3: pck
- Glottolog: pait1244
- ELP: Paite Chin

Paite is a Sino-Tibetan language belonging to the northeastern sub-branch of Kuki-Chin branch. It is spoken by the Paite people in India and Tedim Chins in Myanmar. There are different Paite dialects; some notable Paite dialects are Bukpi, Lousau, Valpau, Dapzal, Tuichiap, Sukte, Dim, Lamzang and Sihzang. The language exhibits mutual intelligibility with the other languages of the region including Thadou, Hmar, Vaiphei, Simte, Kom, Gangte and other languages.

== Etymology ==
The term Paithe originated in the Lushai Hills region. The Lushais used terms Pai or Poi to refer to central and southern Chin tribes, who tie their hair up. Paithe is said to be the plural of Pai. The Paite themselves did not accept the term originally, but in 1948, the Paite National Council was formed to obtain the recognition of Paites as a Scheduled Tribe in India. Thus the term came to be accepted.

Paite has also the meaning of "people on the move".

== Language ==
- The Paite has its own Alphabet (Paite Laimal) propounded by T Vialphung (1889-1936) in 1903 and was later published in the book "Sintung Bu" in 1945. The alphabet is as below:

  A      Aw      B      Ch      D
  E      F       G      Ng      H
  I      J       K      L       M
  N      O       P      R       S
  T      U       V      Z

- This language has simple but long words. Paite is a tonal language and has three tones: High, low, and level. However, the tones are not transcribed in the Latin alphabet. This means that words can look the same but mean different things depending on context and pronunciation. Here are a few words:

Thak – New, Spicy

Sikha – Servant, Ghost

Ngaih – Love, Loud

Bel – Pot (utensil), Early

Thum - Pray, Three

There are still unofficial ways to write tones ( for example, accent marks/diacritics). However, these other ways to write tones are not commonly used.

- The language is included in Tripura's Tribal Language Corpus in which it is recorded that it has 32,626 words.

== Phonology ==
Paite has 6 monophthongs (a /a/, e /e/, i /i/, u /u/, o /o/, aw /ɔ/) and has 11 diphthongs (ai /ai/, au /au/, ei /ei/, eu /eu/, ia /ia/, iu /iu/, oi /oi/, ou /ou/, ua /ua/, ui /ui/, and yai /jai/). Consonants consist of s, k, l, m, n, ŋ (ng), b, dʒ (j), d, f, g, h, p, r, t, v, and z.

== Sample text ==
The following is a sample text in Paite of Article 1 of the Universal Declaration of Human Rights:

Paite pau	English
Mi tengteng zalen a piang ihi ua, zah-omna leh dikna tanvou ah kibangvek ihi. Sia leh pha theihna pilna nei a siam I hih ziak un I mihinpihte tungah unauna lungsim feltak I put ngai ahi.	All human beings are born free and equal in dignity and rights. They are endowed with reason and conscience. Therefore, they should act towards one another in a spirit of brotherhood.

There are two major dialects of Paite spoken in Manipur: Lamjang and Dapjal; and 4 minor dialects which are Songtal, Bukpi, Lousau & Kangkap.

== Geographical distribution ==
Paite is spoken mainly in the following locations (Ethnologue).

- Manipur: They spread across more than 70 villages in several districts namely Churachandpur district, Pherzawl district, Jiribam district, Chandel district, Tengnoupal district
- Mizoram: They live in more than 20 villages across the different districts such as Aizawl district, Champhai district, Saitual district, Khawzawl district.
- Assam: Diphu and villages like Khawnuam, Zawlnuam, Suangsang in Karbi Anglong.
- Tripura
- Chin State, Myanmar (In Myanmar, the language is also known as Tedim Chin, which in turn is also related to the Tedim Township)

== Education and Academic ==
Paite language can now be taken up as one of the MIL subjects offered in the Three-Year Degree course in Manipur University. The Academic Council of the university in its meeting held on April 22, 2004, gave its approval for the inclusion of Paite as one of the MIL subjects after considering recommendation by the Board of Studies of the School of Humanities, and also in recognition of the richness of the language and its literature including creative writing.

== Bibliography ==
- Kamkhenthang, H. (1988), The Paite, a Transborder Tribe of India and Burma, Mittal Publications, ISBN 9788170990703
