= Tengnoupal =

- Town
- Location in Manipur, India Tengnoupal (India)
- Coordinates: 24.385°N 94.144°E
- Country: India
- State: Manipur
- District: Tengnoupal

Government
  - Type: democratic
- Elevation: 1,450 m (4,760 ft)

Population (2011)
  - Total: 2,158

Language(s)
  - Official: Meitei (officially called Manipuri) (Note: Meitei language (officially known as Manipuri language) is the official language of Manipur. Other regional languages of different places in Manipur may either be predominantly spoken or not in their respective places but "Meitei" is always officially used.)
  - Regional: Thadou
- Time zone: UTC+5:30 (IST)
- PIN: 795131
- Vehicle registration: MN
- Coastline: 0 kilometres (0 mi)
- Website: tengnoupal.nic.in

Tengnoupal (Meitei pronunciation:/teŋ-nə́u-pəl/ (Note: Meitei language (officially known as Manipuri language) is the official language of Manipur. Other regional languages of different places in Manipur may either be predominantly spoken or not in their respective places but "Meitei" is always officially used.)) is a hill town at the highest point of a road (NH-2) between Imphal and Moreh at the end of northwestern Myanmar; the ASEAN Highway passes through the village. It is the district headquarters of the recently reinstated Tengnoupal District.The climate is cold during winter and humid during summer and remains foggy during the rainy season.

== History ==
The name Tengnoupal is derived from cactus fencing (teng = cactus and pal = fence). 'Tengnou' means 'tender cactus'

It was named after the Awa Laan (Manipur-Burmese War) in the 16th century as cactus was planted as a fencing in Tengnoupal Hill range. The then Tengnoupal villagers and surrounding villages fought against the Burmese who came to invade the Meitei kingdom of the Imphal Valley; whilst many young warriors of Tengnoupal were killed and taken as hostage to Burma.

In the 19th century, Tengnoupal was the epicentre of Anglo-Kuki War wherein more than 30 personnel of the British force were annihilated under the command of Pu Chomsho Mate, the nephew of Pu Loikhom Mate, Chief of Tengnoupal. After that incident, the British Army captured Tengnoupal.

Hence then, Tengnoupal became the Army and Administrative HQ of the then British Government.

During World War II, the people of Tengnoupal supported the Indian National Army (INA) led by Subhas Chandra Bose. The INA and the Japanese Army even brought in tanks and other heavy war equipments with the help of the local people led by Pu Sholim Mate and they were about to capture the Imphal Valley. Knowing the advancement of the INA and the Japanese Army, after occupying strategic locations at Tengnoupal the British Royal Air Force (RAF) bombarded the whole hill rages of Tengnoupal where many INA, Japanese and local volunteers were killed.

After India became independent in 1945, Tengnoupal remained the administrative HQ and District HQ until the 1970s, when it was shifted to Chandel in 1974.

== Administration ==
It is the District headquarters of Tengnoupal District. Some notable government machineries stationed in the village are:

1. Deputy Commissioner/ District Magistrate Office

2. Superintendent of Police office

3. District Hospital.

5. Forest Range Office

6. Assam Rifles Battalion Headquarters since 1994

7. Tengnoupal Police Station

8. Zornal Education Officer

10. District Public Works Department

11. Chief Medical Office

The Chandel district was formerly known as Tengnoupal district until the change was effected on 13 May 1974.

== Geography ==
The National Highway 2 snakes through Tengnoupal east to west. It is 69 km from Imphal. Nearest airport is Tulihal Airport. It is the highest point above sea-level on the Imphal-Moreh Highway.

== Location ==
The village is a transit point of some state highways, including the Tengnoupal-Sita-Sansak road and Tengnoupal-Joupi-New Samtal road.

== Demography ==
Tengnoupal, with total 300 household residing, has population of 2158 of which 1477 are males while 681 are females as per Population Census 2011.

In Tengnoupal village population of children with age 0-6 is 140 which makes up 6.49% of total population of village. Average Sex Ratio of Tengnoupal village is 461 which is lower than Manipur state average of 992. Child Sex Ratio for the Tengnoupal as per census is 750, lower than Manipur average of 936.

Tengnoupal village has lower literacy rate compared to Manipur. In 2011, literacy rate of Tengnoupal village was 76.02% compared to 79.21% of Manipur. In Tengnoupal Male literacy stands at 84.75% while female literacy rate was 56.36%.

== Tourism ==
There is increasing the inflow of tourist every season. During monsoon, the place is foggy and makes it the best place for romance. Since Tengoupal is situated on the topmost range of the Indo-Myanmar region visitors could get a bird's eye view of the surrounding hills and the plains of Kabaw Valley (Myanmar).

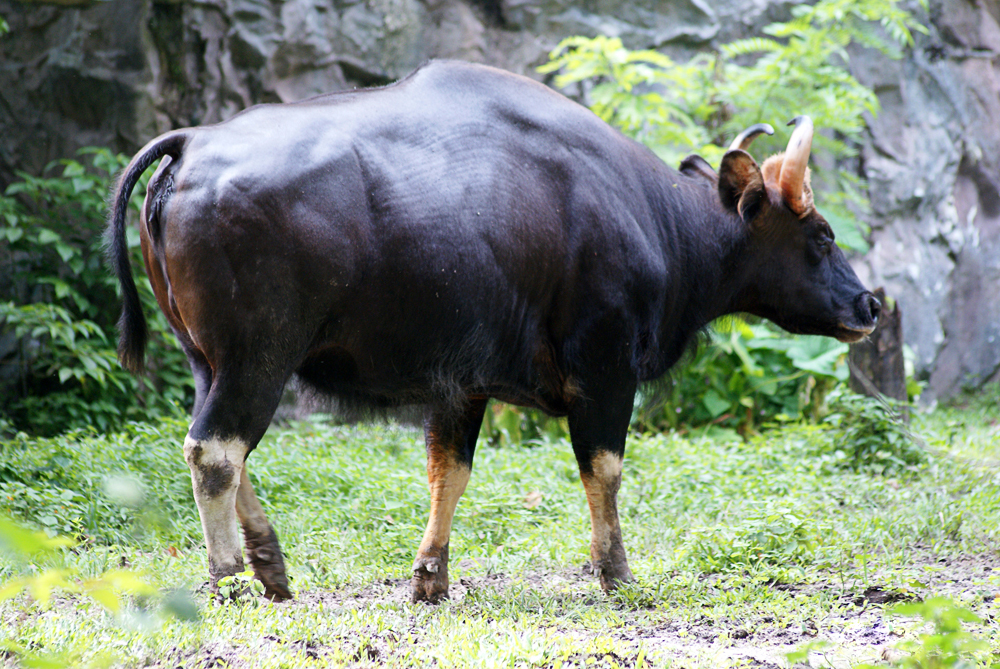
Malayan gaur locally called Siel

Besides, during summer the cold winds to sweep the hills of Tengnoupal which makes this place the most sought after for summer recreation for families.
