= Hrangkhol people =

Sub tribe of Halam community in Tripura, India

The Hrangkhawls or Hrangkhol are a subtribe of the Hmars and speak the Hrangkhawl dialect of Tibeto-Burmese origin. They first settled at Champhai of Mizoram and later scattered to different parts of North-East India. Though the majority of the Hmars speak the lingua-franca of the Hmar i.e. Khawsak țawng/Literary Hmar, many of the 20+ Hmar subtribes (such as Faihriem țawng, Leiri țawng, Țhiek țawng, Zote țawng, Darngawn țawng, etc.) also speak their own dialects just like the Hrangkhawls. In the history of the Hmars specifically around the 15th century AD, the Hmar subtribes were united by Rêngpui (Great king/great ruler; title) Chawnhmang Buhril who placed 6 Rêngtes (Lesser/smaller rulers; title) who were effectively regional rulers and also had village chiefs under them. Here, in this era the northern regional ruler was Demlukim Hrangkhawl who ruled from Mawmrang village in present day Saitual district of Mizoram, and by the late stages of Rêngpui Chawnhmang's reign, it was recorded that he gave all his Rêngtes royal gifts before he departed for Tripura. For Rêngte Demlukim Hrangkhawl, the Rêngpui gave him a pinto/spotted horse and after that, taking many of his Hrangkhawl and Darlawng subjects, he migrated to Tripura. This is also the reason why Tripura is known to the Hmars (Mizos) as "Rêngram" (Land of the Rêng/Ruler). They are listed as one of the 21 scheduled tribes of Indian state Tripura. They are mainly dwelling in the Teliamura sub-division of West Tripura and the Ambassa sub-division of Dhalai districts. The Hrangkhawls are also found in the North Cachar Hills of Dima Hasao district, Assam, Mizoram, Manipur and Myanmar.

== See also ==
- Tripuri people
- Kokborok
- Mizo people
- Kasana
- Hmar people
- List of Scheduled Tribes in India
