= Khangshim =

Coordinates: 24.469°N 94.039°E

Khangshim is a village in Chandel district of Manipur, India.
