= Gangte language =

Sino-Tibetan language of India

Gangte
- Region: India
- Ethnicity: Gangte
- Native speakers: 16,500 (2011)
- Language family: Sino-Tibetan: Kuki-Chin; Northeastern; Gangte
- Writing system: Latin

Language codes
- ISO 639-3: gnb
- Glottolog: gang1266
- ELP: Gangte

Gangte is a Sino-Tibetan language of Kuki-Chin linguistic sub branch of Northeastern India. Its speakers primarily live in Manipur and the adjacent areas of Meghalaya and Assam. The language appears to be homogeneous with no known dialectal variation and exhibits at least partial mutual intelligibility with the other Chin-Kuki-Mizo dialects of the area. The speakers of this language use Meitei language as their second language.

== Geographical distribution ==
Gangte is spoken in 37 villages of southern Churachandpur district, Manipur. It is also spoken in Meghalaya and Assam.

== Characteristics ==
The language appears to be homogeneous with no known dialectal variation. It exhibits at least partial mutual intelligibility with the other Chin-Kuki-Mizo dialects of the area including Thadou, Hmar, Vaiphei, Simte, Kom and Paite languages.

The speakers of this language use Meitei language as their second language (L2), according to the Ethnologue.
