= Kuki National Front =

Militant organisation in Manipur, India

- Leader: Nehkholun Kipgen †
- Dates active: 18 May 1988 – present
- Headquarters: Kangpokpi
- Active regions: Manipur
- Size: 400–500
- Part of: Kuki National Organisation, United People's Front
- Wars: insurgency in Northeast India

Kuki National Front (KNF) is a Kuki militant organisation operating in the state of Manipur, India. Its professed goal is to achieve a 'Kukiland' state within the framework of the Indian constitution. At present, it has split into multiple factions which have joined the umbrella groups Kuki National Organisation (KNO) and United People's Front (UPF) along with a Suspension of Operations (SoO) agreement with the Government of India.

== Background ==
Until 1986, the Kuki people of Manipur participated in the Greater Mizoram movement of the Mizo National Front. The signing of the Mizo Accord left them in the lurch, and also created a "security void" with respect to the Naga militant group National Socialist Council of Nagaland (NSCN) formed in 1980. NSCN had the agenda of creating "Greater Nagalim" containing all the Naga-inhabited areas in various states, in particular Manipur. Naga areas were interlaced with Kuki villages in northern hills of Manipur. The Naga integration movement resorted to the use of threat and forcible eviction of Kukis living among their midst.

The Kuki National Front (KNF) and the Kuki National Organisation (KNO), along with its armed wing Kuki National Army (KNA), were formed in the face of these developments in 1988. Whereas KNF is based in Kangpokpi, KNO operates in all the Kuki-inhabited areas in India and Myanmar, except for Nagaland.

== History ==
The Kuki National Front was formed on 18 May 1988 (Note: The year is mentioned as 1987 in some sources.) at Molnoi village along the India–Myanmar border. Nehkholun (Nehlun) Kipgen was its founder chairman. The base of the organisation is nevertheless Kangpokpi in Manipur, India. The objective of the organisation has been to achieve a separate 'Kukiland' state within India consisting of the districts of Sadar Hills (Kangpokpi), Churachandpur–Pherzawl and parts of Tamenglong–Chandel and Ukhrul.

Some 300 KNF guerrillas are said to have undergone training with the Kachin Independence Army in Myanmar. They may have also collaborated with United Liberation Front of Assam for armed training. From 1992, the KNF, along with KNA, locked horns with the Naga militant group NSCN-IM, as part of the Kuki-Naga clashes.

Nehlun Kipgen was killed in an encounter with the Central Reserve Police Force (CRPF) in Kangpokpi area. After this, KNF split into multiple factions, including:

- KNF (Military Council), headed by Hemlal alias Th. German,
- KNF (President group), headed by Thangboi Kipgen, which in turn produced further splinter groups:
  - KNF (Zogam), headed by Joshua Haokip, and
  - KNF (Samuel), led by T. Samuel Haokip.

After some internecine attempts in the 2000s, eleven militant groups gathered under the umbrella of Kuki National Organisation in 2008, (Note: Even though KNO started with its own armed wing KNA in 1988, it now operates as an umbrella group with multiple armed groups under its wing.) which included KNF (Military Council) and KNF (Zogam). KNF (Samuel) also joined the organisation in 2010. The KNF (President group) joined another umbrella organisation called United People's Front (UPF). All these groups entered into a Suspension of Operation (SoO) agreement with the Government of India and the Government of Manipur in August 2008. These groups are now collectively referred to as "SoO groups".
