= Koijam =

Koijam is a Meitei surname. Notable people with the surname include:

- Bijoy Koijam, Indian politician
- Radhabinod Koijam (born 1948), Indian politician
