= Machi, Manipur =

Village in India

Coordinates: 24°58′N 79°00′E

Machi village (MACHI BLOCK under tengnoupal district) is located in India and listed under Taluk : Machi, in the district of Tengnoupal, in Manipur state, India.

It is located 28 km towards North from Chandel District Headquarter.

== Machi Village Location ==
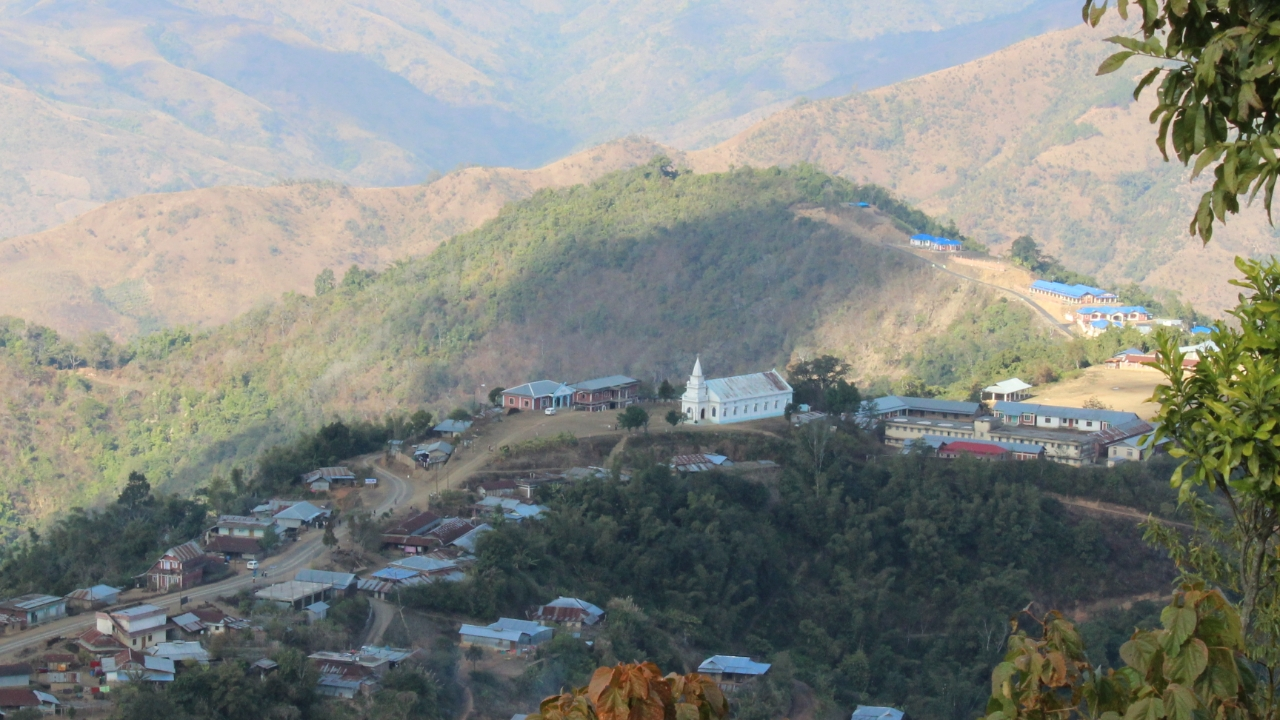
the view of machi

Tehsil Name : Machi
District : Tengnoupal
State : Manipur
Language : Maring
Time zone: IST (UTC+5:30)
Telephone Code / Std Code: 03848

== Pincodes ==
near Machi Village 795135
Langol village,
Parentong village,
Lamlong village,
Khunbi village,
Kakching, 795148
Wangjing, Manipur, 795131 (Moreh)

== Places near Machi Village ==
=== Places ===
Itanagar- 326 km
Khonsa- 344 km
Changlang- 372 km
Ziro- 378 km
Tirap- 379 km

=== Cities ===
- Kakching- 24 km
- Thoubal- 40 km
- Mayang Imphal- 29 km
- Lilong- 50 km

=== Taluks ===
- Machi- 3 km
- Kakching- 16 km
- Thoubal- 20 km
- Imphal East Ii- 21 km

=== Airports ===
- Imphal Municipal Airport- 41 km
- Kumbhirgram Airport- 140 km
- Dimapur Airport- 175 km
- Aizawl Airport- 191 km

=== District Headquarters ===
- Thoubal- 20 km
- Chandel- 35 km
- Imphal West- 44 km
- Bishnupur- 47 km
