= Simte language =

Kuki-Chin language of India

Simte
- Kuki
- Native to: India
- Region: Manipur
- Ethnicity: Simte people
- Native speakers: (10,200 cited 2001 census)
- Language family: Sino-Tibetan: (Tibeto-Burman); Kuki-Chin; Northeastern; Simte
- Writing system: Latin

Language codes
- ISO 639-3: smt
- Glottolog: simt1238
- ELP: Simte

Simte is a Kuki-Chin language of India. It is spoken primarily by the Simte in Northeastern India, who are concentrated in Manipur and adjacent areas of Mizoram and Assam. The dialect spoken in Manipur exhibits partial mutual intelligibility with the other Kuki-Chin dialects of the area including Thadou, Hmar, Vaiphei, Paite, Kom and Gangte. It is written in Latin script.
