= Vaiphei language =

Sino-Tibetan language on India

Vaiphei
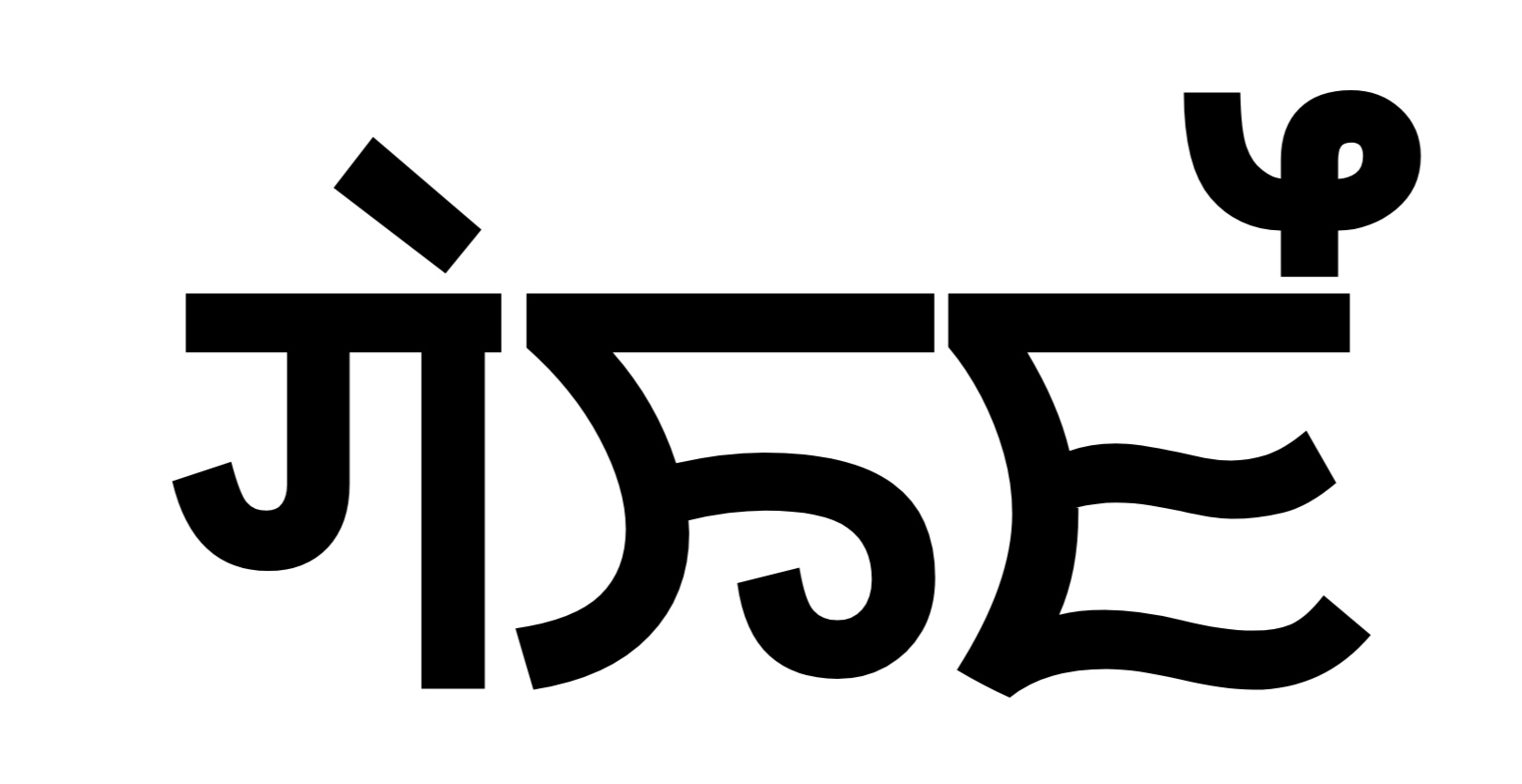
- "Vaiphei" in Meitei script
- Region: India
- Ethnicity: Vaiphei / Zo people
- Native speakers: 43,000 (2011 census)
- Language family: Sino-Tibetan: (Tibeto-Burman); Kuki-Chin languages; Northeastern Kuki-Chin languages; Vaiphei

Language codes
- ISO 639-3: vap
- Glottolog: vaip1239
- ELP: Vaiphei

Vaiphei is a Sino-Tibetan language belonging to the Kuki-Chin languages linguistic sub-branch of the Tibeto-Burman group of languages. It is spoken mainly in the Indian state of Manipur and minutely in Mizoram, Assam, Meghalaya, and Tripura. The dialect spoken in Manipur exhibits a least partial mutual intelligibility with the other Zo-Mizo dialects of the area including Thadou, Hmar, Paite, Simte, Mizo and Gangte languages.

== Geographical distribution ==
Vaiphei is spoken in more than 30 villages of Lamka District, Southern Manipur (Ethnologue). There are also speakers in Assam, Meghalaya, Mizoram and Tripura.

== Orthography ==
There is no official single spelling system, but many use the orthography of Mizo. Some writers use the circumflex ⟨ˆ⟩, but its meaning is inconsistent. /ɔ/ is represented by ⟨o⟩ in open syllables and ⟨aw⟩ in closed syllables in the orthography. The glottal stop /ʔ/ is represented by the letter ⟨h⟩.

== Phonology ==
=== Consonants ===
Vaiphei has the following consonants, with the first symbol being its orthographical form and the second one its representation in the IPA:

		Labial	Alveolar	Velar	Glottal
Plosive	voiceless	⟨p⟩ /p/	⟨t⟩ /t/	⟨k⟩ /k/	⟨h⟩ ʔ
Plosive	aspirated	⟨ph⟩ /pʰ/	⟨th⟩ /tʰ/	⟨kh⟩ /kʰ/	
Plosive	voiced	⟨b⟩ /b/	⟨d⟩ /d/	⟨g⟩ /ɡ/	
Affricate			⟨ch⟩ /ts/		
Nasal		⟨m⟩ /m/	⟨n⟩ /n/	⟨ng⟩ /ŋ/	
Fricative	voiceless		⟨s⟩ /s/		⟨h⟩ /h/
Fricative	voiced	⟨v⟩ /v/	⟨z⟩ /z/		
Lateral			⟨l⟩ /l/		

/p, t, k/ are heard as unreleased [p̚, t̚, k̚] in word-final position. The aspirated and voiced stops /pʰ, tʰ, kʰ, b, d, ɡ/ are restricted to syllable-initial position.

The glottal stop occurs only in syllable-final position, always occurs with low tone, and can be deleted.

The fricatives and the affricate do not occur word-finally.

The voiceless plosives, nasals, and laterals can all be the first members in a vowel sequence, and all phonemes except the glottal stop can be the second. Consonant clusters can be found in some loanwords, e.g., /ilektrik/ 'electric'. /p, t, k, m, n, ŋ, l/ can all form geminates, e.g., /seppatni/ 'Monday'.

=== Vowels ===
==== Monophthongs ====
Vaiphei has five phonemic monophthongs.

	Front	Back
Close	⟨i⟩ /i/	⟨u⟩ /u/
Mid	⟨e⟩ /e/	⟨o/aw⟩ /ɔ/
Open		⟨a⟩ /ɑ/ (Note: Suantak uses /a/.)

/e/ tends to be realized as [ɛ] word-finally.

==== Diphthongs ====
Vaiphei has eight diphthongs, /ai, ei, ui, ɔi, au, eu, iu, ɔu/. These can all occur in word-medially and word-finally, but /au, eu, iu, ɔu/ cannot occur word-initially.

=== Tone ===
Vaiphei is a tonal language with three contrastive tones, two contour tones and a low tone. Suantak (2013) uses numerals, where 1 is lowest and 5 is highest, and provides Chao tone letters.

Tones
Tone	Chao tone letter	IPA	gloss
Low (21)	˨˩	/sa²¹/	'sing'
Rising (23)	˨˧	/sa²³/	'hot, meat'
Falling (52)	˥˨	/sa⁵²/	'thick'

All three tones can occur on any vowel. All tones can occur with /m, n, ŋ, l, p, t, k/ though the rising and falling tones do not co-occur with the glottal stop /ʔ/.

Tone sandhi occurs in compound words; for example, a low tone becomes a rising tone when preceded by a rising tone (e.g., /in²³/ 'house' + /tsuŋ²¹/ 'above' → [in²³tsuŋ²³] 'roof').

=== Syllable structure ===
The syllable structure in Vaiphei is (C)V(C). The maximal syllable is CVC.

Basic syllable patterns
Syllable	IPA	Gloss
V	/u/	'elder (brother/sister'
VC	/in/	'house'
CV	/pa/	'father'
CVC	/gam/	'land'

== Sources ==
- "Abstract of Speakers' Strength of Languages and Mother Tongues - 2011" (PDF). censusindia.gov.in. Archived from the original (PDF) on 20 February 2022.
- Suantak, Khawlsonkim (2013). Vaiphei Phonetic, Phonology, and Morphology: A Descriptive Study. Department of Linguistics (PhD thesis). North-Eastern Hill University.
