= Simte people =

Tribe in northeast India and Myanmar

Total population
- c. 12,300

Regions with significant populations
- Manipur; Mizoram; Falam District; Assam

Languages
- Simte

Religion
- Christianity; traditional religion

The Simte, or Sim, are one of the Zo ethnic tribes in northeast India and western Myanmar. They are mainly concentrated in the Churachandpur of Manipur, India and Chin State in Myanmar. Most of the Simte are descendants of Ngaihte. A significant number are also settled in neighbouring areas of Mizoram and Assam.

== Etymology ==
The term Simte translates to 'southern people'.

== Culture and religion ==
Traditionally, meat was given as a precious gift to relatives and friends, and also during special occasions such as weddings. For centuries, they practiced "animistic" rituals, worshiping a supreme god and engaging in sacrifice.

In the 2011 Indian census, 98.6% of Simte people were reported as Christian.

== See also ==
- List of Scheduled Tribes in India
