= Thadou language =

Tibeto-Burman language spoken in India

Thadou–Kuki
- Thado Chin, Thadou, Kuki
- Thadoupao
- Native to: India
- Region: Manipur
- Ethnicity: Kuki people, natively to the Thadou tribe.
- Native speakers: 350,000 (2011–2017)
- Language family: Sino-Tibetan: Tibeto-Burman; Kuki-Chin-Naga; Kuki-Chin; Northeastern; Thadou–Kuki

Language codes
- ISO 639-3: tcz
- Glottolog: thad1238
- ELP: Thado Chin

Thadou, Kuki, or Thado Chin is a Sino-Tibetan language of the Northeastern sub-branch of Kuki-Chin. It is spoken by the Thadou people in Northeast India (specifically in Manipur and Assam). The speakers of this language use Meitei language as their second language (L2) according to the Ethnologue.

The language is known by many names, including Thado, Thado-Pao, Thado-Ubiphei, Thādo, Thaadou Kuki, or just Kuki or Chin.

There are several dialects of this language: Hangshing, Khongsai, Kipgen, Saimar, Langiung, Sairang, Thangngeo, Haokip, Sitlhou, Singson (Shingsol). The Saimar dialect was reported in the Indian press in 2012 to be spoken by only four people in one village in the state of Tripura. The variety spoken in Manipur has partial mutual intelligibility with the other Mizo-Kuki-Chin languages varieties of the area including Paite, Hmar, Vaiphei, Simte, Kom and Gangte languages.

== Geographical distribution ==
Thadou is spoken in the following locations (Ethnologue).

- Northeast India
  - Manipur
    - Chandel district
    - Churachandpur district
    - Senapati district
    - Kangpokpi district
    - Tengnoupal district
    - Pherzawl district
  - Assam
    - Karbi Anglong (Mikil Hills)
    - NC hills (Dima Hasoa)

== Dialects ==
Ethnologue lists the following dialects of Thadou, the names of which mostly correspond to clan names. There is high mutual intelligibility among dialects.

- Lupho
- Lupheng
- Misao
- Hangsing
- Chongloi
- Khongsai
- Kipgen
- Langiung
- Sairang
- Thangngeo
- Haokip
- Sitlhou
- Touthang
- Haolai
- Singson (Shingsol)
- Hanghal
- Lhouvum
- Mate
- Lhungdim
- Baite

The Saimar dialect is only spoken by 4 people in one village, which is located in Tripura.

== Phonology ==
=== Consonants ===
| | | Labial | Alveolar | Palatal | Velar | Glottal |
|---|---|---|---|---|---|---|
| Plosive | voiceless | p | t | | k | ʔ |
| Plosive | aspirated | pʰ | tʰ | | | |
| Plosive | voiced | b | d | | ɡ | |
| Affricate | | | ts | | | |
| Nasal | | m | n | | ŋ | |
| Fricative | voiceless | | s | | x | h |
| Fricative | voiced | v | z | | | |
| Fricative | lateral | | ɬ | | | |
| Approximant | | w | l | j | | |

- /p t k/ are heard unreleased as [p̚ t̚ k̚] in word-final position.
- /ts/ is heard as more apical [ts̺] when occurring before front and central vowels.
- /x/ can have a cognate of an aspirated velar plosive [kʰ] in the dialect spoken in Burma.
- /ɬ/ can have an allophone of [l̥] in word-medial position.

=== Vowels ===
| | Front | Central | Back |
|---|---|---|---|
| Close | i | | u |
| Mid | e | ə | o |
| Open | | a | |
