= Paite people =

Ethnic group living in Northeast India

Paite
Total population
- c. 80,000+

Regions with significant populations
- Manipur, Chin State, Assam, Mizoram

Languages
- Paite language

Religion
- Christianity · Islam

Related ethnic groups
- Chin; Hmar; Mizo; Simte; Vaiphei; Thadou; Ranglong

The Paite people (Note: Alternative spellings: Paitei, Paithe, Paihte. Older spellings: "Pytai".) are an ethnic group in Northeast India, mainly living in Manipur and Mizoram. The Paites are recognized as a scheduled tribe in these two states. They are part of the Zo people, but prefer to use the Zomi identity. "Guite" is a major clan of the Paite people.

== Etymology ==
The term Paithe originated in the Lushai Hills region. The Lushais used terms Pai or Poi to refer to central and southern Chin tribes, who tie their hair up. Paithe is said to be the plural of Pai. The Paite themselves did not accept the term originally, but in 1948, the Paite National Council was formed to obtain the recognition of Paites as a Scheduled Tribe in India. Thus, the term came to be accepted.

Paite has also the meaning of "people on the move".

== Identification ==
According to anthropologist H. Kamkhenthang, the term "Paite" was initially used only in the Lushai areas (present-day Mizoram). In the Chin Hills region, according to him, they were known as Tedim Chins, and they included the Kamhau-Suktes. According to scholar N. K. Das, the Simte people listed in the Gazetteer of Manipur are the same as Paites. Ethnologue states that the Paite, Simte and Tedim Zomi dialects are almost identical. However, the Government of India recognises the Paites and Simtes as separate tribes in the list of Scheduled Tribes. In the 2001 census of India, the Paites numbered 64,100 and the Simtes numbered 10,225 (by language use).

In the British colonial records, Paites were often identified by the clan name of Guite (older spelling: "Nwite"), who provided the chiefs for the Paite people. Carey and Tuck state that the Guites used to be originally settled around Tedim, but migrated north to the southern border of Manipur and the northeast corner of Mizoram. The reason was evidently the onslaught of the Sukte chieftain Khan Thuam ("Kantum", the father of Kam Hau). Some of the Guites submitted to Khan Thuam and eventually got absorbed into the Suktes, while others migrated north to settle in the present-day Tonzang Township and the adjoining parts of Churachandpur and Chandel districts, which were at that time not part of the Manipur kingdom.

== Manipur ==
In Manipur, the Paites number about 55,000 as of 2018, forming 1.94 percent of the state's population. They are concentrated in the Churachandpur district and dominate the Churachandpur Town (locally known as Lamka). The Paite language is considered the lingua franca of the town. The Paites are believed to be the most recent entrants into Manipur from Chin Hills, some stating that they moved after World War II.

In the Churachandpur area, Paites have local organisations such the Paite Tribe Council, Young Paite Association, Paite Literature Society and Siamsinpawlpi (SSPP, students' welfare body). They mostly follow the Christian faith, with the majority belonging to the Evangelical Baptist Convention Church.

Paites were part of the Kuki National Assembly (KNA) formed in 1946, but soon intra-tribal rivalries took over and the majority of the tribes moved out of KNA to form a rival Khulmi National Union (also called "Khul Union"). (Note: "Khulmi" meant the people of the cave origin, referring to the originary myth shared by all Kuki-Chin tribes.) The essential point of tension was the apprehension that the Thadou Kukis, who are much more numerous than the other tribes in Manipur, would dominate the KNA. The Khulmi National Union contested the legislative assembly elections in 1948 and won seven seats. It participated in government formation, which was however short-lived due to Manipur's merger with Indian Union.

"Khulmi" was meant to be an alternative identity to rival the Kuki identity, but the Government of India gave recognition to the Kuki identity, by listing "Any Kuki tribe" in the list of Scheduled Tribes in 1951. Subsequently, many of the Old Kuki tribes in the Khul Union moved towards the Naga identity, and the seven larger tribes led by Paites stood alone. In 1995, these seven tribes adopted the Zomi identity and formed the Zomi Re-unification Organisation (ZRO) at the instance of the Paites.

During 1997–1998, there was an ethnic clash between the Paites and Thadou-speaking Kuki tribes in the Churachandpur district, which saw 352 people dead and thousands displaced, but a peace agreement was reached in the end. On this occasion, an underground militant wing of ZRO, called the "Zomi Reunification Army" or "Zomi Revolution Army" (ZRA), was formed. (Note: There is another organisation named "Zomi Revolutionary Army" in the Chin State of Myanmar, formed by Tedim Chins.) According to security expert E. N. Rammohan, the Paites were not well-armed and took a beating in the clashes. ZRA fled across the border to Myanmar, where it formed an alliance with the Naga militant group NSCN-IM.

Paites also dominate the underground group United People's Front (UPF), which has been in talks with the central government of India since 2008, demanding "a state within a state" for the tribal communities of Manipur.

== Mizoram ==
In Mizoram, the Paites numbered about 23,000 as of 2011. They are found living in more than 20 villages spread across 4 districts, namely Saitual district, Champhai district, Aizawl district and Khawzawl district.

The Paites living in the region "Sialkal Tangdung" are given a special administration in aid to develop and uplift the local areas called the Sialkal Range Development Council (SRDC). Mimbung, Teikhang, Hiangmun, Kawlbem, Selam and Vaikhawtang villages are included in it.

SRDC was first set up as the Sialkal Tlangdung Development Board by the Government of Mizoram in February 2012. It was changed to a Council in 2013.

== See also ==
- List of Scheduled Tribes in India
