= Vangteh =

Village in southern Tedim Township, Myanmar

Vangteh ဗန်းတဲ့ (Burmese)
- Village
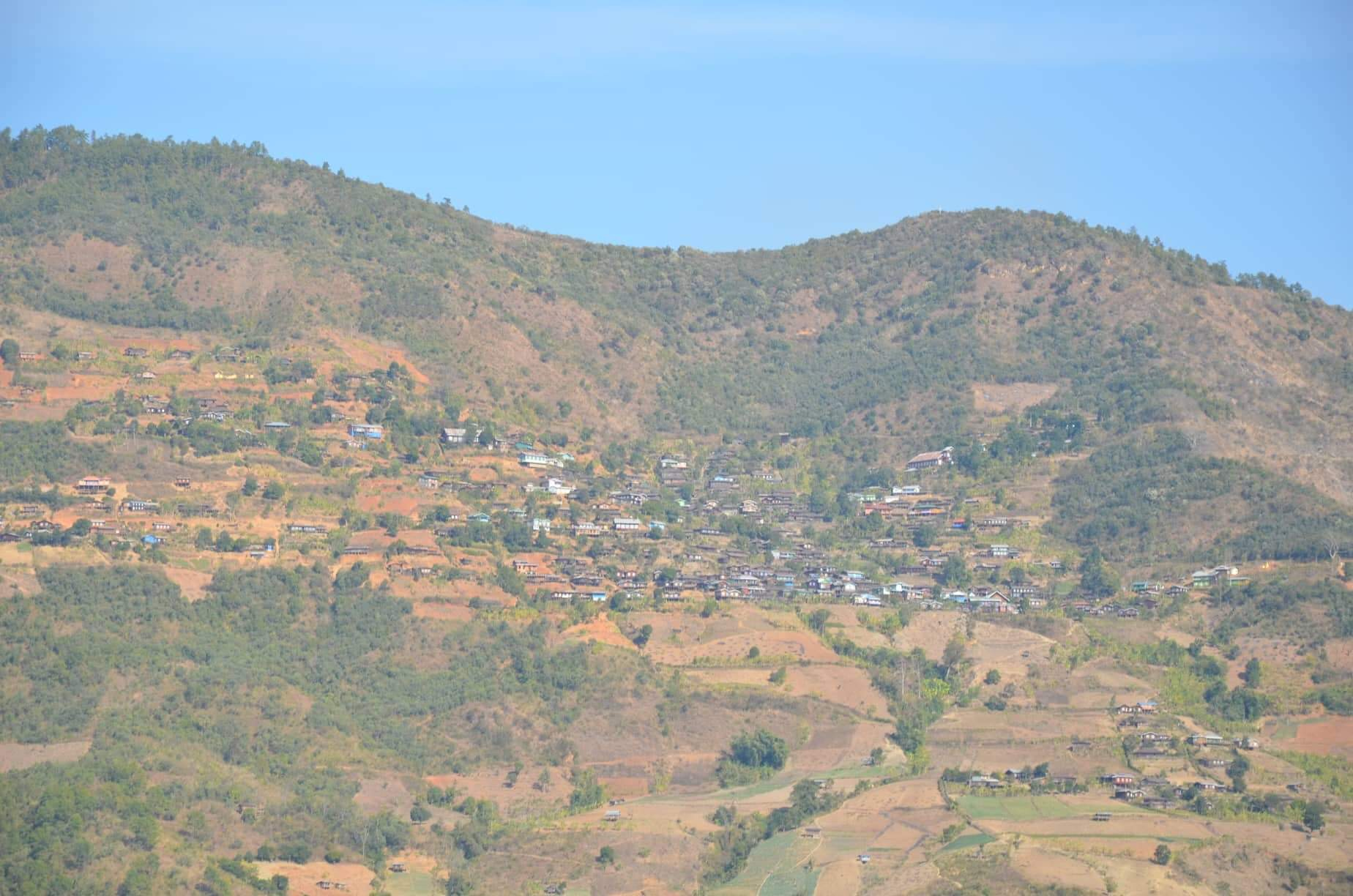
- View of Vangteh

- Location within Myanmar
- Coordinates: 23°15′07″N 93°40′23″E
- Country: Myanmar
- State: Chin State
- District: Falam District
- Township: Tedim Township
- Time zone: UTC+6.30 (MMT)

Vangte or Vangteh is a large village in southern Tedim Township, Falam District, Chin State, in Myanmar. Vangteh is also the name of the village tract where Vangte lies.

== Name ==
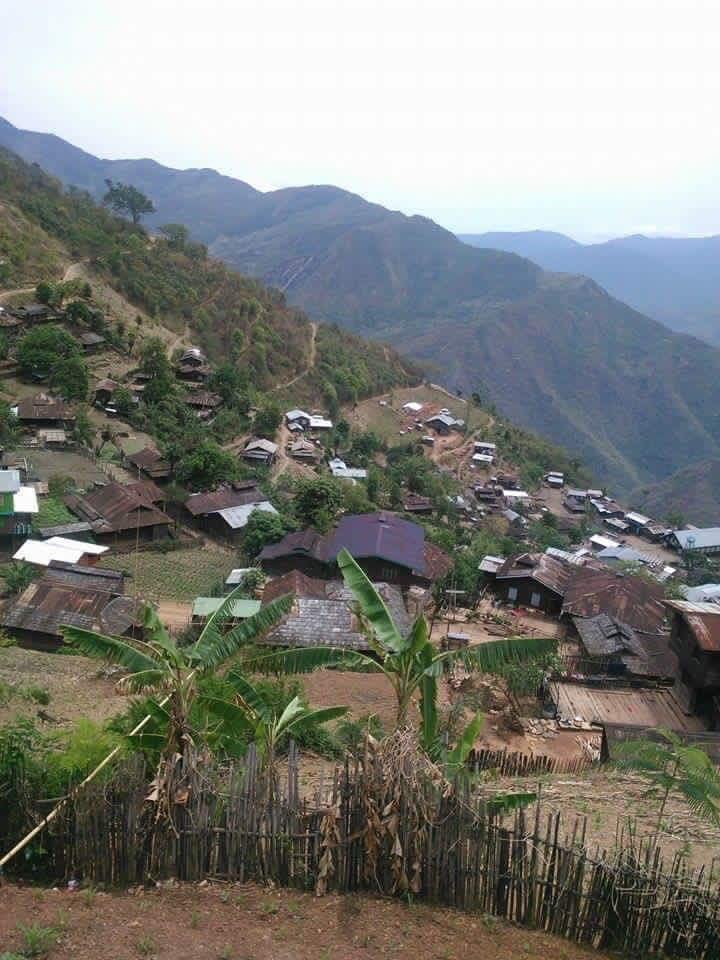

It is sometimes spelled as Wunkathe, probably a mispronunciation by Burmese guides when the British came to the land for the first time, and also recorded as Vangte by contemporary writers as can be seen in the information provided by such as the Satellite Views, the Falling Rain Genomics, Inc., the Travel Post, and such.

In the local area, Vangteh is still known as a "khua-pi", in the language of the natives, "khua" generally means any human abode, big or small, and "pi" is a suffix meaning "large" in extent or "great" in character or "big" in size. Hence maybe a reference to former greatness despite its very discouraging geographical situation in the mountainous Chin Hills, where elevations vary from 1500 and 2700 meters.

In common poetic expression, Vangteh is also addressed as "Khumhnuai", meaning "under the shade of Khumh", in respect of the peak of Khumh Mt. (Khumh Vum in local dialect), under its shade this ancient city is laid for centuries. For instance, in a poetic song composed by Mr. Ngul L. Zam, a villager of Vangteh, for an event commemorating the founding of Vangteh, Vangteh is directly attributed as Khumhnuai as seen in following:

Tuan aa pupa' siahtaang kaihna, Khumhnuai ka Vang khua hi ee;
Zingvai hawmpih hanzai sakpih pawl le gual ih kim nam aw [N. L. Zam, Spring 1994].

(Translation)

The Khumhnuai is my native town of Vang (short form for Vangteh), where forefathers collected their respective taxes and tributes;
Are we all here, friends and comrades, who usually join hands together in pains and in comforts?

== History and legend ==
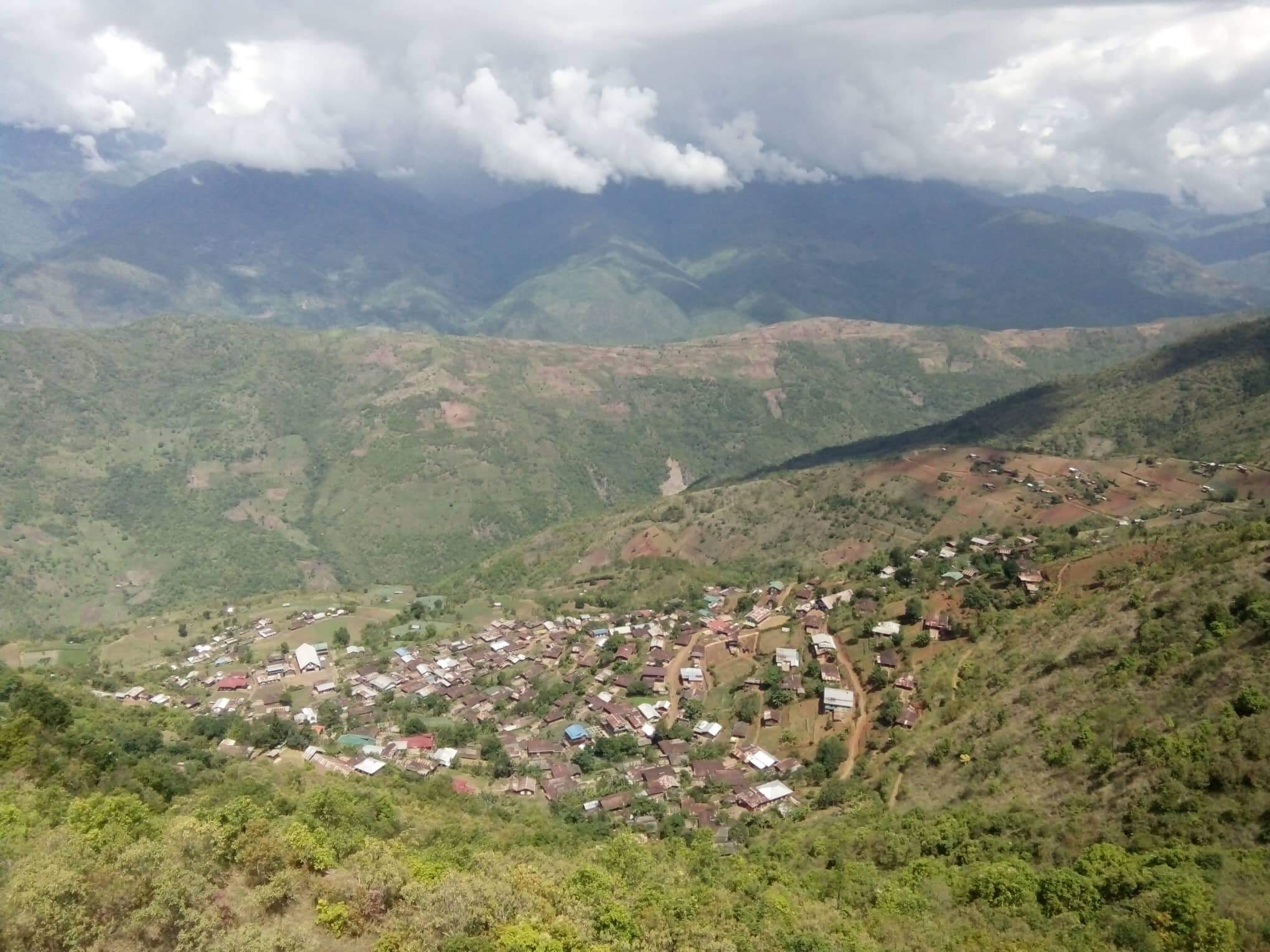

Oral traditions gives at least glimpses of the proud history of Vangteh as being one of the once political centers of the ruling Guite or Nwite (Vuite, Nguite [local pronunciation in Vangteh], Gwete, Gwite) family in the region, that its sovereignty in the region lasted for more than half a millennium (c. AD 1300–1900).

While other tribes and clans were also retaining their chieftainship in their local areas, but none of those could claim the same sovereignty that of the Guite family until the mid 19th century when the allied force of the southern Pois (Pawi) spilled over northward. Accordingly, S. K. Khai made a remark on the once unparalleled sovereignty of the Guite family by differentiating them as "Mang" even to contrast with the later emerging power of the Sukte family that was marked only as "To" in the book. In the native language, "Mang" implies the natural state of sovereignty by means of conscience and "To" implies a struggle for sovereignty by military conquest or force.

This old Vangteh might undoubtedly be one of the most appropriate archeological sites for experts who might want to trace back the story of at least the so-called northerners of the present Chin State (Zogam), who identified themselves more as Zomi as a whole.

=== Oral tradition ===
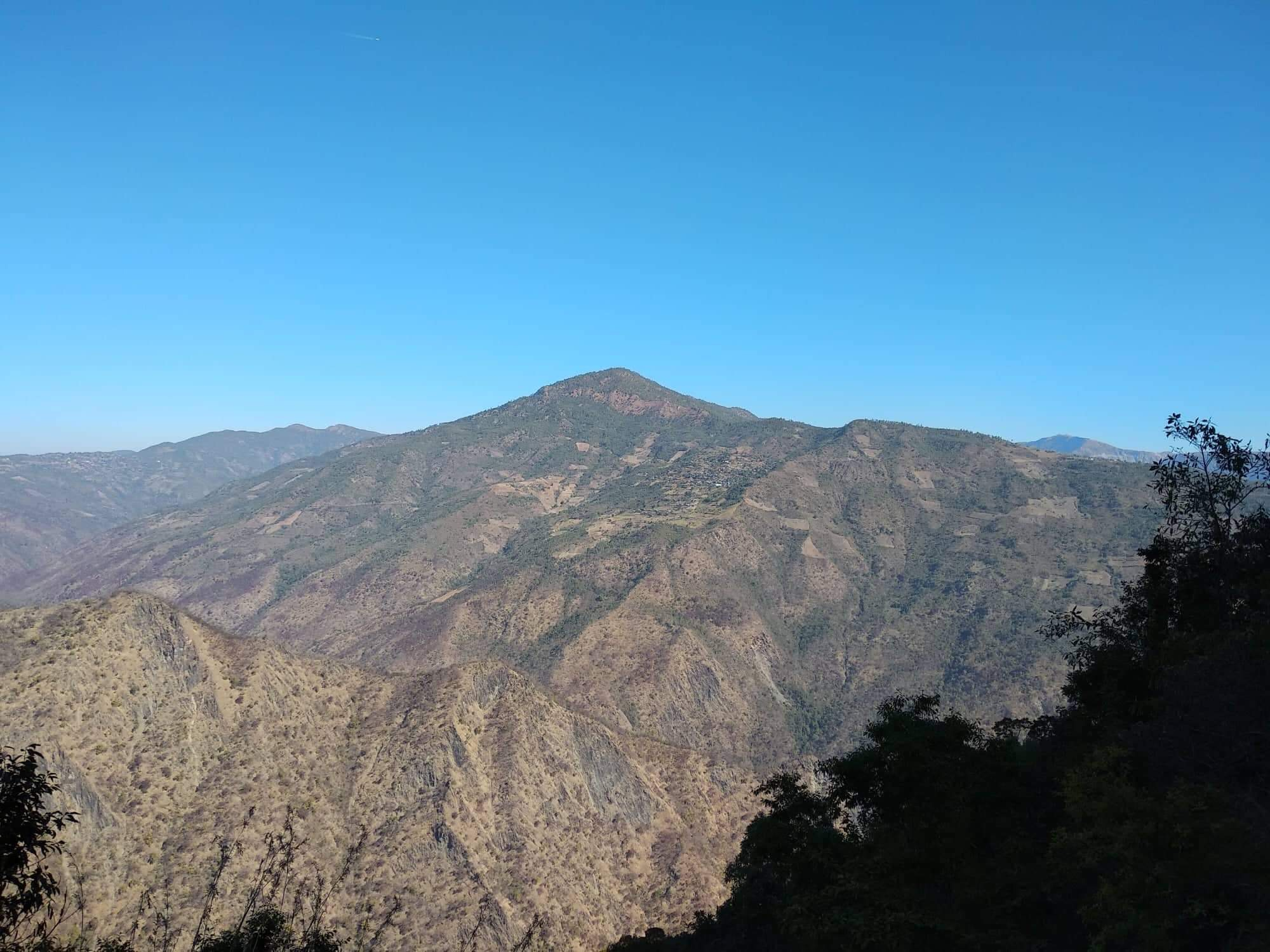

As the surviving remnants of old-time tribal religion keep their ancient rituals in the midst of the over-flooding Christianity in the land, oral traditions (oral tradition) such as sacred incantation, traditional war song, nursery rhyme, and other folk song are still in use by almost 100 households in Vangteh until this present time. According to the list that this author had taken during his last trip to Vangteh in 2000, there are still about one hundred households who are still practicing the ancient religion that they call "Pu-sa", meaning worship of "ancestral spirits" (similar to ancestor worship). In 2002, official permission to print some limited copies of their sacred incantations was granted by the Myanmar government in keeping their culture for those who still practice this old-time religion in Vangteh.

=== The birth of Vangteh ===
According to oral traditions, the establishment of Vangteh was related to the pre-encampment of the Vahuis (Vahui), Ngaihtes (Ngaihte), and Neihgups (Neih Khup or Neih Gup) at the place called Tawizawi, which is in the precinct of present-day Vangteh, in finding a new settlement from Ciimnuai (Chinwe), the place of their first settlement in the region. As this new place seemed comfortable for them, they came back to Ciimnuai to get permission for their new settlement. According to the tradition, in order to receive spiritual and political protection in any new settlement, ritual permission of the ruling house is needed.

This tradition was no doubt invented for two purposes—to receive spiritual (religious) protection and claim political legitimacy (or even military alliance) under the cover of the then ruling house—as this archaic society is so much bound to religious superstitious practices. Even until the late nineteenth century, it is evident that this tradition was unbrokenly practiced in the region through the religious aspect that was slightly lost by that time. For instance, in the history of the establishment of the village of Kaptel by the later emerging Sukte family, the authority was derived from the Tlaisun family of present Falam to claim the political legitimacy and military alliance.

In reply to their request, Mang Suum the Great, Prince of Ciimnuai, promised to send one of his younger brothers, Kul Gen, by the following year when the proper residence was ready for him. According to one of the existing folk songs, this also is another story. As reflected in the song, three princes, sons of the late Gui Mang the Great were making a discussion about how to make administrative regions as the Tawizawi peoples (Vahui, Ngaihte, Neihgup) on the one hand and the Guava peoples (Gangte, Baite, Valte) on another were asking for leadership and new settlement at the same time. While discussing the matter and making religious rites for divination, a strange bird was seen hovering over them and sang a poetic song repeatedly, that says:

Tuilu aa pai, ni le kha siam; tuitaw aa pai simzawng vontawi dawnto peeng mawh
(Translation):
To go up to the upper river is to be blessed by the sun and the moon; to go down to the lower river is to be poor but would have wine.

However, the youngest prince, Naksau [Kullia], being the ecstatic interpreter, confused the upper and the lower when he came to his senses. Thus, the final decision was accordingly made as the youngest prince, Naksau, humbly chose to be less advantaged by going up to Guava, the upper region, but to be blessed, in fact; then, Kul Gen, the second prince, to the Tawizawi, the lower region, but just to be not more than enough; and, Mang Sum, the eldest, to remain in Ciimnuai, their ancestral home. On his arrival by the next summer, Kul Gen named his residence "the house of Vangteh," meaning "budding or sprouting of glory," from which the name Vangteh came to be popular in following decades.

This earlier encampment at Tawizawi is also evident in one of the sacred rites, in which the priest or family-head should recite names of several places and regions in a claim of peace and prosperity to those places against any harm that seen or unseen foes might bring. This rite is called "khuasuum sim." In the recitation, Tawizawi comes first right after Vangteh. In fact, this seniority, on another hand, indicates the prevalent existence of the Tawizawi at the beginning of the history of Vangteh.

To stress little more on the rite, "khua-suum sim" implies how far the power [suum] of the khua [an indirect reference to Vangteh] had reached as names of those places and regions are annually recited. In fact, on the one hand, it is clear how much the religio-political role of Vangteh for those places was crucial in those days when the rite was first invented almost half a millennium ago.

=== Independent city-state ===
Further, this new settlement in the Tawizawi is meant more than finding a new place to the citizens. It was actually making a new history under the leadership of their crowned prince, Kul Gen. This concept is clearly evidenced in the shorter genealogical list of the Vangteh Guite family, in which several names of previous ancestors, except seemed very significant, were totally omitted and stress was visibly given on Kul Gen and Gen Dong, the son of Prince Kul Gen born in this new settlement. For instance, the shorter list of Vangteh Guite tradition can be read as follows:

Guite beget Ni Gui, Ni Gui beget Gui Gen, Gui Gen beget Gui Mang, Gui Mang beget three sons (Mang Suum, Kul Gen, and Nak Sau [Kul Lai]).

However, in a longer list, there are even more than ten ancestral names were entered between Guite the Great and Gui Mang the Great. This is, as stated, evidence of the independent status of Vangteh from Ciimnuai though the ruling family continuously retained the name Guite to indicate their legitimacy and affinity to the greater Guite dynasty.

This independent state of Vangteh is more than evident in the oral tradition, in which the division of royal right between these two legendary brothers, Mang Suum and Kul Gen, was always remembered as a nursery poem was sung by the babysitter. The poem simply says:

Ka nau aw ee, Gen Dong aw, Ciimnuai dongah Gen dong aw [M. Suum I, c. 1400].
(Translation):
My little baby, named Gen Dong (meaning Gen is asking or taking counsel), that Gen (a reference to Kul Gen) has asked of me too far Ciimnuai in showing off his respect...

This poem reflects what had happened behind the song. According to an oral tradition related to this poem, when Prince Kul Gen saw his first-born son in his new place, in showing his respect, he sent his armor-bearer called Langgsum to Ciimnuai to ask for baby's new name and blessing. Being greatly pleased with this brotherly love and respect, Prince Mang Suum chanted a prayer and composed this nursery poem to be sung at the occasion of giving the name and sent the armor-bearer back to Tawizawi-Vangteh with a gift of billy goat for his baby nephew. However, on his way back home through the lower bridge, Langgsum, tightly tying the billy goat at his wrist, fell off from the bridge while crossing the Sialtang creek and died without any rescuer under heavy rain as it was said to be during fall.

Therefore, being assumed that Langgsum was kidnapped or killed by enemies or beast on the way, Kul Gen summoned a council and decided to go to Ciimnuai in a query of the situation. Therefore, Prince Mang Suum decided to delegate his authority to his younger brother so that there would not be a need to come to Ciimnuai again and that the Vangteh people should decide their own future by themselves. This story was told as "hausa tuul khenna" throughout generations in Vangteh. The following is the commemorative song of this event that Prince Mang Suum and Prince Kul Gen were said, without prearrangement, sang spontaneously that is traditionally believed as a kind of inspired prophetic utterance.

Ciim leh Tawi tui a ih maankhawm in, ning leh ai-sa in kizawituah ang;
Tuu bang suanh dang in ki-el lo-in, phung Gui ni nuai-ah kibawmtuah ang [M. Suum I & K. Gen, c. 1400].
(Translation):
As long as the people of Ciim (short form for Ciimnuai) and people of Tawi (short form for Tawizawi) reign or prosper, let us maintain our fellowship banquet, a banquet of wine and meat;
Let our offspring not go against each other but let us join together under the name of solar Gui family.

With this news of "tuul khenna", Prince Kul Gen and his council came back to Tawizawi through the lower bridge, called Bizaang Lei, and there they found the body of poor Langgsum, hanging on the other side of the bridge and the billy goat on another. To remember this event, Kul Gen added another sentence to the poem so it was sung as following in Vangteh until this present time:

Ka nau aw ee, Gen Dong aw, Ciimnuai dongah Gen dong aw; Keeltal kai in si aw ee [ed., K. Gen, cf. 1400]
(Translation):
My little baby, named Gen Dong, that Gen (a reference to Kul Gen) has asked of me too far Ciimnuai in a showing off his respect; but, he poorly died in the attempt to bring the billy goat home

=== Shift to Khumnuai-Vangteh ===
However, as the population grows, space was seemed not enough to accommodate them at Tawizawi. Therefore, by the time of Gen Dong, the then crowned prince of Tawizawi, a new shift to another place became an urgent need. Not soon after, when a better fertile land was later found by Thuam Tung Neihgup, a member of the council, on his way to hunting, in a lower land, a new move was accordingly organized by Gen Dong. Since then, the old name Tawizawi was replaced as the place itself also was deserted, with the new name Vangteh.

In order to confirm this new shift, a sacred incantation was created by Prince Gen Dong, that was traditionally known as "khuavang-paih", in which names of representatives from each family-groups who were present at finding this new settlement were annually recited and, of amongst, four names were emphatically stressed in the recitation that says,

"Mun Ting' khua, Zo Thuam' khua, That Phung' khua, Zui Kim' khua na tai in... (meaning, the native place of Mun Ting, of Zo Thuam, of Thah Phung, and of Zui Kim, be blessed...)"

According to tradition, Mun Ting, grandson of Prince Gen Dong, is the representative of Guite family as the first; Zo Thuam, a grandfather of Thuam Tung, is the representative of Neih Gup family as the second; Thah Phung, son of the unrecorded name, is the representative of Vahui family as the third; and Zui Kim, son of Awh Kham, is the representative of Ngaihte family as the fourth.

This names-recitation was annually incanted by priest and head of each family-groups in their sacred religious performances as a rite until this present day. In light of this sacred rite, the fame of Prince Gen Dong as the founder of Vangteh is indisputable, therefore, whenever there is a big events or festivals in Vangteh, everyone in Vangteh claimed themselves as children of Gen Dong ("Gen Dong' tuu, Gen Dong' taa") in spite of which family they belong to, in belief of his spiritual protective power and might. This also becomes a common practice in Vangteh to shout "Gen Dong' tuu, Gen Dong' taa" in general.

In commemoration of this new establishment and the growing peace and prosperity they enjoyed, further, Prince Gen Dong made a big festival the next year and composed a commemorative song to be annually repeated during any social gathering or religious celebration. The song was sung as follows:

Vangkhua sa'ng ee Khumpi (Khumhpi) dung nuai ah, lentu ciingzing kuam sat ing; Gamzaang tukol tawi in saigual sing ing ee
Buaivom nawhna kulhsing zaang thuap ah Dong in ka khawhtaang ciauli lai suun aa, sauzawl palsak palkhang thuam in ciang ing ee [G. Dong, c. 1400]
(Translation):
Have I built a town under the Khumpi (Khumhpi), cleansing all thick bushes; So was so exalted among many in that tableland having corps of grains and fruits
Have I so prosper having all my barns and houses full of grains so seem like a sea of grains in that fertile tableland where I had driven those wild animals with my spear

Further, Prince Gen Dong was well-recorded in the chronology of other tribes as a very capable noble prince, founding other new settlements for his people and subjects. For instance, in the chronology of Ngawn (Ngorn), being addressed as Ngen Dawk depending on local accent, he was attributed as to have had founded Bualkhua in present Falam. The fact is further evidenced in another folk song that says:

Kawlni ee, Lenthang ee, a pi ee a no ee...nahtang teh kawmaa meilah tawh tai ta ee [Unknown, c. 1450]
(Translation)
Old and young...with all belongings left for Kawlni and Lenthang

Further, there are also another nursery poem that also reflects this story:

Akkpi ta kop ka khawi, Lenthang khua ah tai tah
Lenthang khua ah tai tah, Ano pualah in a mei nahtaang kawm ah vingvial

According to Vangteh tradition, "Lenthang (Lensang in local accent of Vangteh)" and "Kawlni" were the first places established during the reign of Prince Gen Dong for the Vahui family in extending of Vangteh territory.

This is clear evidence of the sprouting-out of the glory of Vangteh even to a far country under his majestic rule of Prince Gen Dong (Gendong), also known as Ngen Dong in local pronunciation of Vangteh, or Ngen Dawk in Ngawn chronology, or even Gen Dawka in Lushei (Lusei) tradition.

== History continued ==
It was said that Vangteh had populated even to host 700 households in spite of being a far hilly country during its heyday, and became a political center of the Guite Dynasty that claimed a solar lineage.

"Dynasty" here is the nearest English equivalent for the native word ukna or "maanna" or ukna gam or uk-gam, literally means "reigning" or "sovereignty" or even "rule". Concerning the claim of solar lineage of Guite family, it is related to ancient myth of the Great Guite as if the great son of the Sun, whose mysterious birth is related to the Sun as was advocated by strange dreams of his father Songthu (known as Prince of Aisan) and his mother Nemnep. Thus, the name Guite that implies to be "Ni gui (the ray of the Sun)" was given to him at his birth. In keeping of this tradition unbrokenly, another famous Guite prince, Go Khua Thang (Go Khaw Thang or even Goukhothang), prince of Mualpi, was also attributed again as the descendant of the Sun in his documentary video presentation.

Here is an existing coronation anthem constituted by Prince Mang Tawng, son of Prince Gen Dong, that was traditionally used whenever a new prince was installed.

Ka pu sial sut sun nuam mah sing ee; Ka pa taang lap laam nuam mah sing ee;
Ka pa khawlmual hi hen ah ee; Kei zong khawl nuam lai sing ee, nu aw ee [M. Tawng, c. 1450]
(Translation):
Let me be able to celebrate the same celebrations that their majesties, grandpa and dad, had celebrated;
Let me be able to take a rest at the same resting place of his majesty father; O! mom, let me be

Under powerful princes, such as Mang Tawng, Mang Kiim, Pau Hau, Vangteh was also said to have once seated 'seven princes and seven courts' ("Hausa sagih leh tuangdung dawh sagih" in local dialect), which is the honor attributed only to Vangteh among other known cities and towns in the region, designating its political influence even to far distant land in the past (cf., the said sacred rite of "Khua-suum sim"). In concern with this, in his personal record written in his own handwriting, the late Jamaidar N. D. Thang, from another family called Kilte, also well documented the history of "Hausa sagih leh tuangdung sagih" by listing the names of the seven Hausa (princes) with a comment that said Pau Hau as the chief of those seven princes. They are:

Names of courts	Names of princes
Innpi/Muallai	Kaih Mang/Pau Hau
Mantong Innpi	Tuang Son
Tonglai Innpi	Zaang Pau
Tuikong Innpi	Pau Vung
Tualphai Innpi	Tun Kam
Singnuai Innpi	Vungh Do
Khuataw Innpi	Mang El

Due to later internal struggle within the ruling family for power, however, the political influence of Vangteh began to decline from the early 19th century as had to surrender most of its tributary territories before the invading allied force of the Pois (Pawi) beginning in the early mid-nineteenth century. According to the traditions, this allied force included the Zahau army, the Sizang (Liimkhai) army, and probably the Tlaisun army, in which the Sukte family served as guide to them in a secret attempt to replace the sovereignty of the Guite family in the region. Of course, after three heavy confrontations, ill-prepared Vangteh because of their Sialsawm festival [one of the biggest festivals that usually take place during April in present calendar] agreed to negotiate and surrender almost all of its tributary territories to the allied force. Since that time, it was deemed that the former tributary lands of the Guite family of Vangteh were turned to the allied force of the Pois through the indirect hand of the Sukte family of Mualbeam.

However, Vangteh continually maintains its suzerainty within its inner boundary against this great loss. It was until the advancement of the British army in the land at the dawn of twentieth century. Even during the British rule, though, the local judicial authority of the Guite family, the successional ruling family of Vangteh, was respectfully treated. Therefore, when national independence along with the new parliamentary government system was introduced in Myanmar (Burma) country-wide in the 1950s, Tun Za Sing, the last hereditary prince of the Guite family of Vangteh, was properly compensated according to the existing law. This is the ancestral line of the last Prince Tun Za Sing—Kul Gen beget Gen Dong, Gen Dong beget Mang Tawng, Mang Tawng beget Mang Kiim, Mang Kiim beget three sons (Go Phung, Man Tong, Tong Lai), Go Phung beget Za Mang, Za Mang beget Man Pau, Man Pau beget Mang Pau, Mang Pau beget three sons (Kaih Mang, Pau Hau, Do Muang), Do Muang beget Mang Phung, Mang Phung beget Thual/Sual Kai, Thual/Sual Kai beget Hau Tun, Hau Tun beget Kai Thawng, Kai Thawng beget Tun Za Sing.

== World War II ==
Vangteh also made a good record during World War II. As briefly commented by a writer, Vangteh successfully resisted to Japanese occupation even after all surrounding towns and villages surrendered to, thus, a war-time civil affair office was opened there by the British government during that time. Everyone can still smell the ancient flavor of this old Vangteh as a large-size village of present Tedim township of Chin State in the north-western part of Myanmar.
