= Tedim (disambiguation) =

Tedim is a town in Chin State, Myanmar.

Tedim or Tiddim may also refer to:

- Tedim District, in which the town is located
- Tedim Township, in which the town is located
- Tedim language, a Tibeto-Burman language
- Tedim people, ethnic group in Myanmar
- Tiddim Road, connects Imphal to Tedim town
