= Mualpi =

- village
- Location in Burma
- Coordinates: 23.7517°N 93.7273°E
- Country: Myanmar
- State: Chin State
- District: Tedim District
- Township: Tonzang Township
- Elevation: 4,430 ft (1,350 m)

Population (2014)
  - Total: 1,450
- Time zone: UTC+6:30 (MST)

Mualpi (Note: "Mualpi" is the spelling in Tedim Chin. The Thadou language spelling would have been "Molpi". (The corresponding village in Manipur was originally spelt "Monbi" under the sound changes of Manipuri.) The British often spelt the name as "Mwelpi"., but also in the Manipuri style as "Molbee", or "Mombee".) is a village of historical significance in the Tonzang Township in Chin State in Myanmar. It is to the west of Khampat on the bank of the Manipur River, close to the border with India's Manipur state.

The original village was populated by Thadou Kukis, who left the area under pressure from the Suktes, and established a new village under the same name in Manipur's Chandel district. Mualpi was later occupied by Guites under Sukte suzerainty, who continued to raid villages of Manipur, until their chief Go Khaw Thang was apprehended by the Manipuris. Afterwards the Guites themselves moved to the Tonglawn area in present-day Churachandpur district, which was later annexed to Manipur.

== Geography ==
Mualpi is situated on top of a ridge adjacent to the Manipur River in the Tonzang Township of Chin State. It is about 35 km south of Lenikot, which is on the border with India's Manipur state. Tonzang itself is another 30 km to the south of Mualpi.

== History ==
Mualpi was originally built and populated by Thadou Kukis (called "Khongjais" in Manipur) belonging to the Mangvung (Mangwum) family. It was a substantial village of 300 houses. The Sukte chief Khan Thuam ("Kantum") of Mualbem is said to have destroyed the village. The Thadou Kukis rebuilt the village and paid tribute Khan Thuam, and later his son Kam Hau, based at Tedim. "In course of time" (probably during 1840–1860), the Thadou Kukis abandoned the area and moved north to Manipur territory. They established another village of the same name in Manipur's Chandel district, which came to be known as "Monbi" or "Mombi". According to British administrators Cary and Tuck, most Thadou Kukis had moved to the Manipur territory, and only six of their villages were left in Chin Hills in the later part of the 19th century.

Around 1870, the Guites ("Nwites") left the Tedim area under pressure from the Suktes and moved north, setting in Mualpi. Their chief was Go Khaw Thang ("Kokatung" or "Nokatung"). They were still under the suzerainty of Suktes, and were referred to as "Suktes" by the Manipuris. They continued to raid the villages of Manipur, including the village of Monbi, where they Thadou Kukis had settled down. Their raids became notorious in Manipur. The king of Manipur, in association with the British Resident William McCulloch, established a line of Kuki villages called "sepoy villages" as defence against them.

== Bibliography ==
- Annual Administration Report of the Munnipoor Agency, For the year ending 30th June 1874–75, Selections from the Records of the Government of India (Foreign Department), Calcutta: The Foreign Department Press, 1876 – via archive.org
- Carey, Bertram S.; Tuck, H. N. (1896), The Chin Hills, Volume I, Government Printing, Burma
  - Carey, Bertram S.; Tuck, H. N. (1983) [1896], The Chin Hills, Volume I, Cultural Publishing House
- Mackenzie, Alexander (1884), History of the Relations of the Government with the Hill Tribes of the North-East Frontier of Bengal, Calcutta: Home Department Press – via archive.org
  - Mackenzie, Alexander (2012), History of the Relations of the Government with the Hill Tribes of the North-East Frontier of Bengal, Cambridge University Press, ISBN 978-1-108-04606-0
- Pau, Pum Khan (2012), "Tedim Road—The Strategic Road on a Frontier: A Historical Analysis", Strategic Analysis, 36 (5): 776–786, doi:10.1080/09700161.2012.712387
- Pau, Pum Khan (2019), Indo-Burma Frontier and the Making of the Chin Hills: Empire and Resistance, Taylor & Francis, ISBN 9781000507454
