= Goukhothang =

Zomi prince

Goukhothang (Note: The name is also spelled as Go kho thang or Go Khaw Thang.) (c. 1821–1872) was a Guite chief of the Paite people based at Mualpi in the present-day Chin State of Myanmar (Burma). He was known as the then leader of all Zo people. He was later captured by the Manipuri troops of Raja Chandrakirti and died in an Imphal jail. According to his documentary video presentation released in 2006, he was born in Tedim-Lamzang area of present-day Chin State, one of the then political centers of the Guite clan. He succeeded his father, Mang Suum II, in 1855, and moved the capital to the fortified village of Mualpi in present-day Tonzang township.

== Legacy ==
In commemoration of Goukhothang, a football tournament is bi-annually held in Churachandpur in Manipur, India, by Ropiang Foundation Trust.
