= Pau Cin Hau (Unicode block) =

- Range: U+11AC0..U+11AFF (64 code points)
- Plane: SMP
- Scripts: Pau Cin Hau
- Major alphabets: Pau Cin Hau
- Assigned: 57 code points
- Unused: 7 reserved code points

Unicode Version History
- 7.0 (2014): 57 (+57)

Unicode documentation
- Code chart ∣ Web page

Pau Cin Hau is a Unicode block containing characters for the Pau Cin Hau alphabet which was created by Pau Cin Hau, founder of the Laipian religion, to represent his religious teachings. It was used primarily in the 1930s to write Tedim which is spoken in Chin State, Myanmar.

== Block ==
Pau Cin Hau^{[1]}^{[2]} Official Unicode Consortium code chart (PDF)
	0	1	2	3	4	5	6	7	8	9	A	B	C	D	E	F
U+11ACx	𑫀	𑫁	𑫂	𑫃	𑫄	𑫅	𑫆	𑫇	𑫈	𑫉	𑫊	𑫋	𑫌	𑫍	𑫎	𑫏
U+11ADx	𑫐	𑫑	𑫒	𑫓	𑫔	𑫕	𑫖	𑫗	𑫘	𑫙	𑫚	𑫛	𑫜	𑫝	𑫞	𑫟
U+11AEx	𑫠	𑫡	𑫢	𑫣	𑫤	𑫥	𑫦	𑫧	𑫨	𑫩	𑫪	𑫫	𑫬	𑫭	𑫮	𑫯
U+11AFx	𑫰	𑫱	𑫲	𑫳	𑫴	𑫵	𑫶	𑫷	𑫸							
Notes 1.As of Unicode version 17.0 2.Grey areas indicate non-assigned code points

== History ==
The following Unicode-related documents record the purpose and process of defining specific characters in the Pau Cin Hau block:

Version	Final code points (Note: Proposed code points and characters names may differ from final code points and names)	Count	L2 ID	WG2 ID	Document
7.0	U+11AC0..11AF8	57	L2/10-080	N3781	Pandey, Anshuman (2010-02-28), Preliminary Proposal to Encode the Pau Cin Hau Script in ISO/IEC 10646
7.0	U+11AC0..11AF8	57	L2/10-092R	N3784R	Pandey, Anshuman (2010-05-22), Defining Properties for Tone Marks of the Pau Cin Hau Script
7.0	U+11AC0..11AF8	57	L2/10-073R1	N3865R	Pandey, Anshuman (2010-07-26), Allocating the Pau Cin Hau Scripts in the Unicode Roadmap
7.0	U+11AC0..11AF8	57	L2/10-437	N3960	Pandey, Anshuman (2010-10-27), Preliminary Proposal to Encode the Pau Cin Hau Alphabet in ISO/IEC 10646
7.0	U+11AC0..11AF8	57	L2/11-104R		Pandey, Anshuman (2011-04-27), Proposal to Encode the Pau Cin Hau Alphabet in ISO/IEC 10646
7.0	U+11AC0..11AF8	57		N4017	Pandey, Anshuman (2011-04-27), Proposal to Encode the Pau Cin Hau Alphabet in ISO/IEC 10646
7.0	U+11AC0..11AF8	57	L2/11-116		Moore, Lisa (2011-05-17), "D.3", UTC #127 / L2 #224 Minutes
7.0	U+11AC0..11AF8	57	L2/11-287	N4129	Pandey, Anshuman (2011-07-25), Proposal to Change the Names for Some Pau Cin Hau Characters
7.0	U+11AC0..11AF8	57	L2/11-298		Anderson, Deborah; McGowan, Rick; Whistler, Ken (2011-07-27), "6. Pau Cin Hau", South Asian subcommittee report
7.0	U+11AC0..11AF8	57	L2/11-261R2		Moore, Lisa (2011-08-16), "D.9", UTC #128 / L2 #225 Minutes
7.0	U+11AC0..11AF8	57		N4103	"11.4 Pau Cin Hau alphabet", Unconfirmed minutes of WG 2 meeting 58, 2012-01-03
7.0	U+11AC0..11AF8	57	L2/13-086		Anderson, Deborah; McGowan, Rick; Whistler, Ken; Pournader, Roozbeh (2013-04-26), "7", Recommendations to UTC on Script Proposals
7.0	U+11AC0..11AF8	57	L2/13-067	N4412	Pandey, Anshuman (2013-04-27), Preliminary Code Chart for the Pau Cin Hau Syllabary
7.0	U+11AC0..11AF8	57		N4403 (pdf, doc)	Umamaheswaran, V. S. (2014-01-28), "10.2.3 Pau Cin Hau syllabary - chart", Unconfirmed minutes of WG 2 meeting 61, Holiday Inn, Vilnius, Lithuania; 2013-06-10/14
