= Tedim people =

Zo tribe part of the Chin ethnic group

Tedim Tiddim (Hai-Dim)
Zomi nam

Total population
- c. 87,623 (2014)

Languages
- Zomi language

Religion
- Majority: Christianity; Minority: Laipian, Buddhism, Judaism, Animism

Related ethnic groups
- Northeastern Kukish-speaking peoples; (Guite, Paite, Sukte, Thadou, Zou)

The Tedim people, also called Tedim Chins and Tiddim (Hai-Dim) people, are a Zomi ethnic group, part of the Chin people, primarily inhabiting the Tedim Township in the Chin State of Myanmar. They speak the Tedim language, a northeastern Kuki-Chin language.

The Tedim people were early adopters of the "Zomi" identity, founding the Zomi Baptist Convention in 1953, after a careful discussion of nomenclature. However, the Burmese government never accepted the term "Zomi" and most outsiders do not recognize it either, and so "Chin" is often added to the label "Zomi". According to Khup Za Go, most people called "Chins" by the Burmese do not recognize that name as their identifier, and also feel the Burmese use of it to be abusive or degrading.

The Bible was translated into the Tedim language in 1983, although the New Testament had been translated into and published in it in 1932.
