= Pyidawtha (town) =

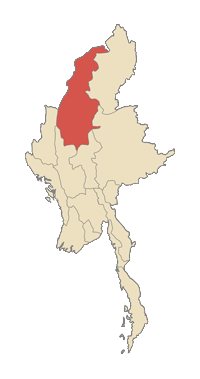

Pyidawtha (Burmese: ပြည်တော်သာ) is a village located in the Kalay Township, Sagaing Division, northern Myanmar (Latitude: 21° 55' 0 N, Longitude: 95° 46' 0 E). The total estimated population is 5,000 people according to Dr. Mung. It is one of the major places where the Tedim Zomi people live, and the Tedim language is spoken in the village.

The township is home to the Kalay University.
