= Zo diaspora =

Dispersal of the Zo (Chin-Kuki-Mizo) peoples of the India-Myanmar-Bangladesh borderlands

- (Zo people) Zo people (including those of ancestral descent)

Regions with significant populations
- India, Myanmar, Bangladesh, the United States, the United Kingdom, Thailand, Malaysia, Israel, Australia, New Zealand, Japan, Canada and the Gulf states

Languages
- Kuki-Chin languages, Burmese, English, Bengali, other languages of countries of residence

Religion
- Christianity (majority); Minority: Judaism; Animism, Irreligion

Related ethnic groups
- Mizo people, Kuki people, Chin people, Zomi, Halam tribe, Karbi people

The Zo diaspora is the dispersal of the Zo peoples, a group of related Kuki-Chin-speaking ethnic communities of the hill region where India, Myanmar and Bangladesh meet. The peoples concerned are also known by names such as Chin, Kuki, Mizo and Zomi. There has also been recent migration of Zo people, much of it as refugees from Myanmar, first to neighbouring India, Bangladesh, Thailand and Malaysia and then, through resettlement programmes, to the United States and other countries.

== Geographic distribution ==
=== Southeast Asia ===
Malaysia became the main destination and transit point for Zo refugees leaving Myanmar; 27,250 Chin people are registered with UNHCR in the country as of August 2024. Because Malaysia does not formally recognise refugees, their legal status remained precarious, and community bodies such as the Alliance of Chin Refugees and the Zomi Association provided schooling, clinics and legal aid while many awaited resettlement to third countries. Most live on the outskirts of Kuala Lumpur or in the Cameron Highlands district.

Thailand was another early destination for those fleeing Chin State.

=== Australia ===
As of the 2021 census, there are 8,407 Chin people in Australia. The Zo community mainly lives in Melbourne (specifically Ringwood, Croydon, Mooroolbark, Bayswater), with smaller populations in Perth (Kenwick), Adelaide (Salisbury), Logan City (Logan Central, Woodridge, Marsden), and Brisbane.

=== Canada ===
As of the 2021 census, there are 1,140 Kuki-Chin-speaking people in Canada.

=== Israel ===
A distinct sub-group of the Zo diaspora is the Bnei Menashe, a Kuki-Chin-speaking community from Mizoram and Manipur who since the mid-20th century have identified as descendants of one of the Ten Lost Tribes of Israel. In 2005, the Sephardi Chief Rabbi Shlomo Amar ruled that the community would be accepted as Jews, though individuals still had to undergo formal Orthodox conversion before making aliyah. Roughly 4,000 to 5,000 members immigrated to Israel over the following two decades, settling mainly in Kiryat Arba, Karmiel, Sderot and other northern and West Bank communities.

In November 2025, the Israeli government, acting on a proposal from Prime Minister Benjamin Netanyahu and Aliyah and Integration Minister Ofir Sofer, approved a five year plan to bring the community's remaining estimated 5,800 members from India to Israel by 2030, at a first phase cost of about 90 million shekels. The first group of what became known as "Operation Wings of Dawn," around 250 immigrants, landed at Ben Gurion Airport in April 2026, with about 1,200 expected to arrive by the end of the year and the rest by 2030.

In Israel, many Bnei Menashe still speak their heritage languages at home, most notably Mizo and Thadou Kuki, alongside Hebrew. This has given rise to a Hebrew influenced register that linguists have started calling Judeo-Zo.

=== Japan ===
The Chin community in Japan numbers hundreds across prefectures like Chiba, Tokyo and Nagoya.

=== New Zealand ===
As of the 2023 census, there are 1,110 Chin people in New Zealand. The Zo community mainly lives in the Nelson, Wellington, and Auckland Regions.

=== United States ===
Church networks, and American Baptist congregations in particular, helped resettle large numbers of Chin and Zomi families in the United States, which became home to one of the more established diaspora communities from Myanmar.

The Indianapolis area of Indiana holds one of the largest concentrations of Chin outside the homeland, with roughly 20,000 people settled mainly in the Southport and Perry Township areas on the city's south side. Tulsa, Oklahoma, hosts the largest Zomi community in the country, estimated at 7,000 to 9,000 people and nicknamed "Zomi Town"; it began with Zomi students who came to study at Oral Roberts University and expanded as refugees followed.

== Causes ==
The biggest factor driving Zo dispersion is the military's actions and resulting human rights violations in Myanmar, including a lack of religious and political rights and experiences of forced labor and widespread poverty.

== See also ==
- Burmese Americans
- Indian Americans
- Indian Jews in Israel
