= Ciimnuai =

Historical Zo city-state

Ciimnuai (Note: Also known as Chiimnwe, Cinnuai, Chinwe, or Chin Nwe) is the legendary city-state of the Zo people, who are mostly referred to as Chins in Myanmar, Mizo and Kuki-Zo in India, and Bawmzo in Bangladesh. Ciimnuai is considered the first Zo settlement in the Chin Hills. The tribe of Ciimnuai's founder and earliest inhabitants remains contested, though accounts point towards the Guite. British colonial administrators described it as the "Eden of the Chins".

It is located about two and half miles southwest of present-day Tedim, within precinct of present Saizang village. Traditions ascribe the founding of the city to Guite family, the ruling house of the time. According to Thadou folklore, it was founded by Song Thu after leading a migration around 1500 AD, though Guite tradition does not mention him and states Guite arrived earlier. The Guite chronicle claims that they ruled in Ciimnual for four generations and founded the towns of Geeltui, Kalzang and Tedim from Ciimnuai. Some of the city's remainings can still be found at the site.

Some contemporary local historians contend that the current site may not be the only Ciimnuai associated with such numerous myths and stories, proposing that other Ciimnuais may once have existed outside the present Chin Hills. If so, the Ciimnuai at the current site may have been a later settlement that adopted the name of an earlier on.

Moreover, even at the present site, several oral histories and traditions indicate that there are at least two different encampments (or settlements) existed at the present site, with at least four generations between them. Some of the commemorative songs and poetic sayings are as follows.

Concerning the first settlement:

Mang ii tusuan kil bang khang ing, zang a pehsik gawm ing, ka kiim a mi siah seu in kai ing,
Ka khua Ciimtui tungah ka vang kammei awi sang sa zaw e. [Guimang I, c. 1050 CE]
(Translation):
I the royal heir has come up (or grown) thus far, collecting those irons and coppers from the plain as well as collecting taxes and tributes from around,
My fame and glory might shine now, like the burning of my fireplace. [Guimang I, c. 1050 CE]

Nih thum siik in gua bang hing ing, ka zua thakiat nua’n ah e, Ka vang khuakiim ah azam hi;
Mang aw lun aw kawi aw, gal in don ve aw, Ciimkhua ka zahzawl ah, laizomte’n neek in huai e. [Mangsuum I, c. 1250 CE]
(Translation):
Stepping two, three mountains under my feet firmly, I’ve come this much after his majesty daddy left, my fame and glory grow everywhere;
O! Behold, all lords, princes, and also my love, that my siblings never miss to come and share their meals at my Cimmnuai residence. [Mangsuum I, c. 1250 CE)

Local sayings concerning later settlement by Tomcil (fifth generation from Guimang I through his youngest son called Naksau or Kullai):

Ami mawl lawmlawm, Tomcil mawl lawmlawm,
Azi Seldal hi leng, Lentang sat pungpung va’ng.
(Translation):
How much is fool Lord Tomcil, O! so fool is he;
If I were his mistress Seldal, I’d beat mountaintop of Lentang thump thump!

Ciimnuai Hausa bangin Sialsiah deih in, Khuakuah ngen!
(Translation):
Like to Lord of Ciimnuai, ask Khuakuah to win Sialsiah!

== See also ==
- Rih Dil
- Vangteh
- Zomia

== Bibliography ==
- Carey, Bertram S.; Tuck, Henry N. (1896). The Chin Hills: A History of the People, Our Dealings with Them, Their Customs and Manners, and a Gazetteer of Their Country. Rangoon, Burma: Government Printing.
- Goswami, M. C.; Kamkhenthang, H. (1975). Clan Among the Paite. Vol. 4. Department of Anthropology, Guahati University.
- Sing Khaw Khai (1995). Zo People and Their Culture. Khampu Hatzaw. LCCN 96905260.
- Sinha, Surajit (1987). Tribal Polities and State Systems in Pre-Colonial Eastern and North Eastern India. Centre for Studies in Social Sciences. ISBN 8170740142.
- Zam, Ngul Lian (2018). Mualthum Kampau Guite Hausate Tangthu (Chronicle of Guite Chiefs the Sovereign Lord of Three Mountain Regions). ISBN 978-1721693559.
