= Sukte =

Sukte may refer to:

- Sukte people
- Sukte language
