= Naulak =

Clan of the Zomi people

Naulak is a clan of the Zomi people.
