= Cikha =

- Town
- Interactive map of Cikha
- Location within Myanmar
- Coordinates: 23.8890°N 93.5315°E
- Country: Myanmar (de jure); Chinland (de facto)
- State: Chin
- District: Tedim District
- Township: Tonzang Township

Population (2014)
  - Total: 1,450
- Time zone: UTC+6:30 (MST)

Cikha is a town located in Tonzang Township, Tedim District, Chin State of Myanmar (Burma). It is close to the border with the Manipur state of India, with Behiang being the opposite town in India. Cikha is the administrative seat of Cikha Sub-township.

Cikha is in the valley of the Tuivai River, which is also called "Cikha stream" in Myanmar. The officials of British Raj referred to it as "Chikoo stream". The Tuivai enters the Indian territory near Behiang and follows a winding course till its confluence with the Barak River at Tipaimukh.

The town was captured by the Chin National Army on 19 May 2024, during the country's ongoing civil war.
