= Pyidawtha =

Pyidawtha may refer to:

- Pyidawtha Plan
- Pyidawtha (town)
