= Khuado =

Traditional festival of the Zomi people

Khuado is a traditional harvest and New Year festival celebrated by the Zomi people, an ethnic group residing primarily in Myanmar and northeastern India. It marks the end of the agricultural cycle and is a time for thanksgiving, purification, and community bonding. The festival is observed annually in October with rituals, music, dance, and feasting.

The Zomi people celebrate two major festivals each year: - Lawm Annek – Held in April after the sowing of seeds. - Khuado – Celebrated in October after the harvest.

While Lawm Annek is focused on kinsfolk reunions, Khuado is broader in scope, bringing together different clans and forming community associations.

== Etymology ==
Meaning of Khuado The term "Khuado" is derived from two Zomi words: - "Khua" – meaning "village" or "community". - "Do" – meaning "to fight" or "to drive away".

Together, Khuado translates to "fighting the evil spirits," symbolizing the community's effort to purify the village and drive away misfortunes.

== Historical significance ==
The Khuado Festival has been celebrated for centuries, with some historical records tracing its origins to the 14th century.

The festival historically served as both a New Year celebration and a spiritual cleansing ritual. It was believed that evil spirits caused sickness, death, and misfortune, so Khuado rituals were performed to exorcise malevolent entities from the community.

== Traditional practices ==
Exorcism and Purification Festival of Lights Lawm and Sawm Associations Khuado is organized through Lawm, a community association where members take turns hosting the festival at their homes. The village headman often serves as the host.

Additionally, young men form the Sawm association, where they sleep in a dormitory called Hamtung under the leadership of a Sawm-u-pa (elder brother). The Sawm members, called Sawm-te, collectively work in fields to raise pigs (Sawm-vok) for Khuado feasts.

== Modern celebrations ==
Due to migration, Zomi communities worldwide now celebrate Khuado in major cities, including: - Tulsa, Oklahoma, USA – The largest Zomi diaspora celebration. - Melbourne, Australia – Annual Khuado festival with cultural displays. - Malaysia and India – Localized events in Zomi-majority areas.

The Zomi diaspora has taken to social media, YouTube, and community websites to promote and preserve Khuado traditions.

== Cultural importance ==
The festival remains a cornerstone of Zomi cultural identity, representing: - Gratitude for a bountiful harvest. - A communal cleansing for the coming year. - A celebration of unity, heritage, and resilience

Through the efforts of Zomi community organizations, Khuado continues to thrive, ensuring cultural heritage is passed down to younger generations.
