= Guite people =

Kuki-Chin clan in India and Myanmar

Guite (Note: Alternative spellings: Gwite, Gwete, Nguite and Nwite.) or Vuite (Note: The Lushai version of the name.) is a clan of Kuki-Chin people in Northeast India and Myanmar. It is associated with the Paite people. Guite was a ruling clan. Paite people, who generally adopted the identity of their ruling clan, were known as Guite people while under Guite chiefs. This practice has now ceased.

Guite chiefs used to control large villages around Tedim (in Chin State of Myanmar). They shared the space with Suktes who were more dominant. After the rise of the Sukte chief Kam Hau, Guites had to move out. Some went north to settle near the border of Manipur and across into Manipur. Others settled in the northeast corner Mizoram. A chieftaincy established at Mualpi had prominent quarrels with the state of Manpur, then a protectorate of British India.

== Adoption of the name ==
According to Zam, Nigui Guite is the elder brother of the ancestral fathers of the Thadou people, namely Thangpi (great-grandfather of Doungel), Sattawng, and Neirawng. This genealogy was recently inscribed on the tribal memorial stone at Bungmual, Lamka in the presence of each family-head of the three major clans, Doungel, Kipgen, and Haokip, on August 7, 2011. Some British writers, like Shakespear, assumed Lamlei was the Nigui Guite himself but the Guites themselves recounted Tuahciang, the father of Lamlei, as the son of Nigui Guite instead, in their social-religious rites. Regarding Guite as the born son of Songthu and his sister, Nemnep, it was the practice of ancient royalty to issue royal heir and also to keep their bloodline pure instead. In accord with the claim of their solar origin, the Guite clan has been called nampi, meaning noble or major or even dominant people, of the region in local dialect in the past.

The name Guite is a direct derivation of the name of the progenitor of the family, known as Guite the Great (see, following genealogical charts), whose mysterious birth was, according to oral tradition, related to the Sun.

Therefore, in order to reflect this solar relationship (i.e., "ni gui" meaning the ray of the Sun), the name "Guite" is said to have been given at his birth by his father, Songthu (also Chawngthu, Chongthu, Thawngthu, and Saothi). After the birth of Guite, Songthu, also known as Prince of Aisan in his later years, moved near to Aisan creek and settled down there with his wife, Neihtong, to give way to his sister Nemnep and her child, Guite, to inherit the Ciimnuai Estate. Therefore, Guite, the elder son, and his descendants are all entitled to the Ciimnuai legacy while as Thangpi, the younger, and his descendants (Doungel and siblings) are titled as Aisan Pa (or Prince of Aisan) accordingly. Further, in reference to Guite's noble birth, a local proverb was circulated that is still known in the region. The proverb says:

Nampi' ta ni in zong siam [Local Proverb, c. 12th century]
(Meaning)
Even the Sun bless the noble birth.

== Some notable Guite chiefs ==
=== Ciimnuai generation ===
- Ton Lun was the first to celebrate the festival of Ton, so was traditionally known as Ton Mang, meaning the Master/Lord of Ton.
- Ni Gui, also known as Niguitea, was a renowned chief, who, according to oral tradition, formulated most of traditional rites and cultural practices, such as the tributary system, festive songs and lyrics, religious festivals, and the Mizo family system, some of which still present in northern Chin State, Myanmar and the Lamka, Churachandpur, and New Lamka areas of Manipur, India. Most families claim descent from Ni Gui. For example, the chronicle of the Sailo chieftains claims their progenitor Sishinga was a son of Ni Gui or The Samte family also claimed to be Ni Gui's descendants.
- Gui Mang I founded the city-state of Ciimnuai in c. 1050CE. Traces of Ciimnuai can still be found around the village of Saizang, Tedim township.
- Mang Suum I was the eldest son of Gui Mang I, who divided the land into three major regions—the upper region of Tuilu, to be ruled by his youngest brother Nak Sau, the lower region of Tuitaw (now Vangteh), to be ruled by his younger brother Kul Gen, and the central region of Ciimnuai, which he himself would rule. The Guite family began to be referred to as the supreme ruling clan of the three-mountains-region (Zou: Mual thum kampau Guite Mang), which consists of the central Ciim mountain region, the south-eastern Khum mountain region, and the north-western Len mountain region.

=== Vangteh generation ===
Gen Dong made Vangteh, near Tedim, his political center and began extending Guite rule to the south and west, crossing the Manipur river.

- Mang Kiim was a capable chief who traveled to more than fifty-three towns and villages, performing sacred rites (Zou: uisiang-at) as a way of asserting his right to rule and guardianship of the land as a priestly King.
- Pau Hau was a powerful chief. He is known as the first Guite chief to go to Chittagong to learn about firearms and the first to use them in the region. Under his leadership, Vangteh became the capital of seven fiefs.

=== Tedim-Lamzang generation ===
- Gui Mang II founded Tedim with other tribes such as the Gangte, the Vaiphei, and the Simte people from lower region. Its name Tedim Chin: Tedim, lit. 'bright and sparkling' was supposedly inspired by the sparkling of bright sunlight light in a pool called Vansaangdim.
- Pum Go relocated his capital from Lamzang to Tedim.

=== Mualpi generation ===
Gokhothang. A powerful chief from Mualpi (originally occupied by the Mangvung/Mangvoong family of Thado tribe 1834-1850), also known as Goukhothang or Go Khua Thang, or even as Kokutung by Carey and Tuck. He is the only Zomi chief whom the neighbouring Meitei (Manipur) Kingdom ever acknowledged as Raja (or Ningthou in Metei language). His powerful dominion spread over more than 70 cities, towns, and villages. He was known as the then leader of Zou people as Carey and Tuck also noted him as the "Yo" Chief of Mwelpi (correct Mualpi). History tells us that the three major tribes as Zo (a) Gwite (b) Vaipe (Vaiphei) and (c) Zo Chin now called Mizo and Hmar.

Suum Kam. Son of Raja Goukhothang is another powerful Guite chief. Colonel Thompson of Manipur, taking advantage of the embassy sent from Kamhow Sukte to discuss the release of his former lord and also brother-in-law, Goukhothang, suggested a treaty be made with Manipur. Sumkam was released from prison along with the bones of his father. A peace treaty was later made between Sumkam and Maharaja Chandrakirti on 11 March 1875, by drinking zu, Zo traditional wine, in their gun-barrels. The treaty came to be called Treaty of Sanjentong, marking the boundary of the Guites and the Meiteis at present Moirang of Manipur, covenanted the non-interference between the Guites and the Meiteis but friendship and promised to betroth a Meitei princess to the house of Prince Suum Kam in securing peace (see, the ending part of Raja Goukhothang Documentary video).

== Tradition of Guite dynastic rule ==
By dating the establishment of the Ciimnuai city-state of present Tedim township to be the early 14th century, Guite dynastic rule can rightly be said to be more than half a century long (until British annexation in the early 20th century, c. 1300–1900), though most southern part of its tributary land was gradually turned to the allied force of southern Pawihang (Poi or Pawite) beginning from the mid-18th century. As cited above, following the legend of land division between the three legendary Guite chiefs (M. Suum, K. Gen, and N. Sau), the geopolitics of the Guite dynasty can accordingly be divided into three major regions---the central Ciimnuai region under Mang Suum I, the lower Tuitaw region under Kul Gen, and the upper Tuilu region under Nak Sau (Kul Lai). Though the Guite dynastic traditions of the two elder chiefs were respectively kept alive until the advancement of the British army, the story of the youngest chief Nak Sau was unfortunately lost from sight except a very brief oral account retained in Vangteh chronicle (that traces Kom Kiim as the daughter of Tom Cil, the last known chief from the line of Nak Sau, and the rest was said as if became the Gorkhas or at least banded together with). While reserving for the lost tradition of Chief Nak Sau, reflecting from the available traditions of Mang Suum and Kul Gen, the two most distinctive features of the Guite dynastic tradition would be its religious orientedness and its confederated administrative system.

== Bibliography ==
- Carey, Bertram S.; Tuck, H. N. (1896), The Chin Hills, Volume I, Government Printing, Burma
- Kamkhenthang, H. (1988), The Paite, a Transborder Tribe of India and Burma, Mittal Publications, ISBN 9788170990703
- Mackenzie, Alexander (1884), History of the Relations of the Government with the Hill Tribes of the North-East Frontier of Bengal, Calcutta: Home Department Press – via archive.org
- Pau, Pum Khan (2019), Indo-Burma Frontier and the Making of the Chin Hills: Empire and Resistance, Taylor & Francis, ISBN 9781000507454
- Shakespear, J. (1912), The Lushei Kuki Clans, London: MacMillan and Co – via archive.org
- Shaw, William (1929), Notes on the Thadou Kukis, Government of Assam – via archive.org
