= Guité =

Guité or Guite is a surname. Notable people with the name include:

- Ben Guité (born 1978), a Canadian ice hockey player
- Charles Guité (born 1943 or 1944), a Canadian civil servant
- Jean-François Guité (1852–1917), a Canadian politician
- Malcolm Guite (born 1957), an English poet, singer-songwriter, priest, and academic
- Marie-Guite Dufay (born 1949), a French politician
- Pierre Guité (born 1952), a Canadian ice hockey player
- Suzanne Guité (1927–1981), a Canadian artist

== See also ==
- Guite people, a major family-group among the Kuki people.
