= Mwetaung mine =

Nickel mine in Chin, Myanmar

Gullu Mual (Mwetaung Mountain)
- Location: Chin State, Myanmar
- Products: Nickel

The Gullu Mual (Mwetaung) is a large mine in the east of Myanmar in Chin State. Located near Tedim Township, the mine contains 36.1 million tonnes of ore with grades of 1.48% nickel.
