= Pau Cin Hau script =

Writing system

- The lettter 'pa' in the Pau Cin Hau script
- Script type: Alphabetic, Ideographic
- Period: 1902 — 1950s
- Direction: Left-to-right
- Languages: Tedim

ISO 15924
- ISO 15924: Pauc (263), Pau Cin Hau

Unicode
- Unicode alias: Pau Cin Hau
- Unicode range: U+11AC0–U+11AFF; Final Accepted Script Proposal

The Pau Cin Hau scripts, known as Pau Cin Hau lai ('Pau Cin Hau script'), or Zotuallai ('Zo indigenous script') in Zomi, are two scripts, a logographic script and an alphabetic script created by Pau Cin Hau, a Zomi religious leader from Chin State, Burma. The logographic script consists of 1,050 characters, which is a traditionally significant number based on the number of characters appearing in a religious text. The alphabetic script is a simplified script of 57 characters, which is divided into 21 consonants, seven vowels, nine final consonants, and 20 tone, length, and glottal marks. The original script was produced in 1902, but it is thought to have undergone at least two revisions, of which the first revision produced the logographic script.

The logographic script has not been encoded, but the alphabetic script has been encoded in Unicode 7.0.

The characters in the script seem to resemble characters in the Latin script and in the Burmese script in a way similar to the relationship between Pahawh Hmong and both Lao script and Latin script. They are glyphically similar but encode different phonological values.

The script was designed for the Zomi language but is able to transcribe other Zo languages, as there are additional letters and tone marks to represent sounds present in other Chin languages but not present in Zomi. The script also had limited use for Christian literature in the region, as is evidenced by some Baptist documents produced in 1931–1932 in Burma.

The script is not only a vehicle for Pau Cin Hau's monotheism. The letters are also used as icons for the religion, along with portraits of its creator.

== History ==
Pau Cin Hau claimed to have a series of dreams in 1900 in which an elderly saintly man, later identified as the creator god Pasian, handed him a book with symbols and taught him certain shapes. From these symbols, Pau Cin Hau created the logographic script in 1902 and later the alphabet.

After being incorporated into Unicode, it is increasingly used in mobile communication and on Facebook, causing Kam Suan Mang, the religious head of Laipianism in 2024, concern that it will lose its sacred purpose, and instead be used like a secular script.

== Unicode ==
The Pau Cin Hau alphabet was added to the Unicode Standard in June 2014 with the release of version 7.0.

The Unicode block for the Pau Cin Hau alphabet is U+11AC0–U+11AFF:

Pau Cin Hau^{[1]}^{[2]} Official Unicode Consortium code chart (PDF)
	0	1	2	3	4	5	6	7	8	9	A	B	C	D	E	F
U+11ACx	𑫀	𑫁	𑫂	𑫃	𑫄	𑫅	𑫆	𑫇	𑫈	𑫉	𑫊	𑫋	𑫌	𑫍	𑫎	𑫏
U+11ADx	𑫐	𑫑	𑫒	𑫓	𑫔	𑫕	𑫖	𑫗	𑫘	𑫙	𑫚	𑫛	𑫜	𑫝	𑫞	𑫟
U+11AEx	𑫠	𑫡	𑫢	𑫣	𑫤	𑫥	𑫦	𑫧	𑫨	𑫩	𑫪	𑫫	𑫬	𑫭	𑫮	𑫯
U+11AFx	𑫰	𑫱	𑫲	𑫳	𑫴	𑫵	𑫶	𑫷	𑫸							
Notes 1.As of Unicode version 18.0 2.Grey areas indicate non-assigned code points

== Fonts ==
Noto Sans Pau Cin Hau supports the Pau Cin Hau script.
