= Rihli =

Lake in Myanmar

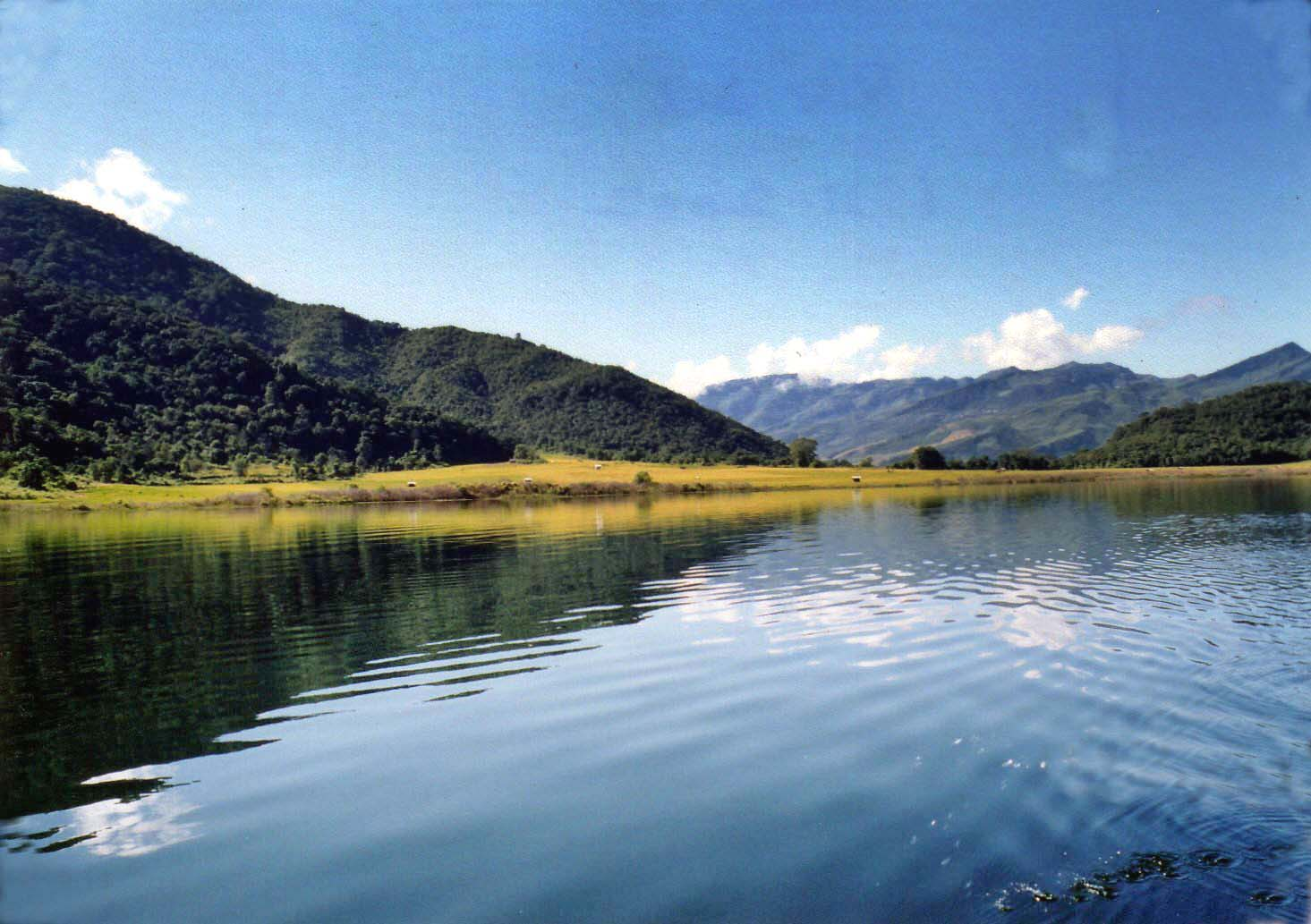

- Location within Myanmar
- Location: Falam Township,Chin State, Myanmar
- Coordinates: 23.340°N 93.385°E
- Type: Natural
- Basin countries: Myanmar
- Max. length: 1 mi (1.6 km)
- Max. width: 0.5 mi (0.80 km)

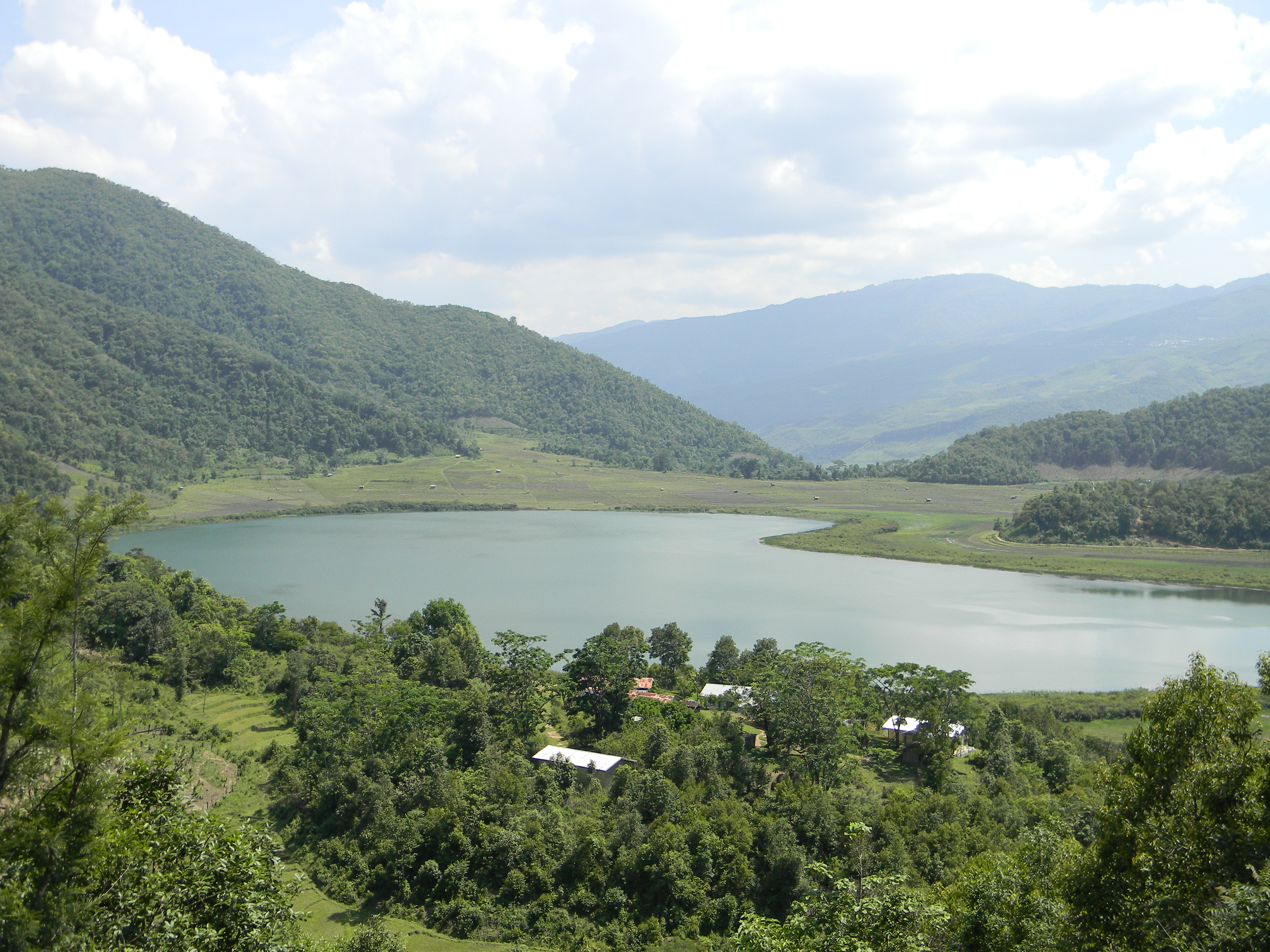
Rih Lake

Rihli (lit. 'Rih Lake') is a natural lake located in Falam Township in northwestern Chin State in Myanmar. It lies at about 3 kilometres (1.9 mi) from Khawmawi, the nearest city situated on the India–Myanmar border. It has a heart-shaped outline. It is about 1 mile (1.6 km) in length, .5 miles (0.80 km) in width, about 3 miles (4.8 km) in circumference and about 60 feet (18 m) in depth.

Rihli holds an important status in the traditional religion and narratives of the Chin people, which includes the Mizo, Laimi, and Zomi, among others. According to Chin ancestors, the lake was a corridor to heaven called Pialral. All souls destined to Pialral must pass through the lake.

== History ==
=== Mythological account ===
The name Rihli is said to derive from a Chin folktale about a girl named Rih. According to legend, Rih and her younger sister had a cruel stepmother, who persuaded their father to get rid of them. The father killed the younger sister in a forest. Upon finding her decapitated sister, Rih found was inconsolable. A good spirit known as Lasi found her and took pity on her. She revealed her a magical tree having a single leaf with which Rih revived her sister back to life. To quench the thirst of her younger sister, Rih turned herself into a small pool of water using the same leaf. Later, Rih was compelled to change herself into a white mithun, and wandered around in search of a safe place. Her sweat and tears formed rih-note (smaller lakes) wherever she went. It is believed that such lakes can still be found in the Vawmlu Range, Zur forest near the village Natchhawng, a place above Bochung village, and the area of Khawthlir village, all of which are in Myanmar. She wandered to Sanzawl village, followed the river Run. But the demon spirit of the river threatened to suck her dry. She migrated westward into Mizoram but found even the valley of Champhai unsuitable. A little further southeast she found the present location, and the lake became Rihli.

=== Traditional account ===
However, in another local version, the lake was originally called “Sialkidul” in reference to its shape of the head of a mithun (little similar to gayal) when viewed from far mountain top. After two generations of human settlement in the region, the tradition says that many black-faced people (maivom in native language) invaded the surrounding land and called the lake “Sri,” which later became transliterated to “Rih” or “Li”. The Maivom people settled there for two consecutive harvest-times (two years). The then Guite chief Mangsum I of Ciimnuai ordered them to bring in annual taxes but they refused and started attack some Guite habitations at Geeltui and Losau instead. Therefore, the chief organized a warfare operation against the Maivom and drove them westward across the Tio. In commemoration of this event, local war songs are still in use in the region. Some of them are:

(Original):
Tuanglam tungah tangpa khau bang ciah’ng, khuhva na tong sia e, tuaklo dawn kawi aw e; khuhva tongsuah tang ka sinlai zen, lumsuang ka tuun kaal in, tungkhai mu’n tuah inla, awi kawi na’ng e. (Gendongh, c. AD 1300)

(Translation):
Atop the road I'm on I tied a tang-pa [poetic for 'young man' - enemy here] like rope. Oh dove [enemy] how unpleasant your voice is, oh how you may become unmet; the words you [dove] have anchored have elated my heart's core, for whilst I tied the shield [enemy], I have joined the hovering eagle in joyful taking, oh let us sing together.

(Original):
Kuansuk ta’ng e, Tiopi dung zui in, Tiopi ah sehtak ah Ciinmang umtui bang ka khuai hi e; namtem tawi in sulzui ta’ng, Tio ii gaal ah pasal lian lu khai ing e. (Vunghsan, c. AD 1300)

(Translation):
I have gone off following the Tio's edge, on the river I have tied an Elder Mang [Chief, Ruler, Noble] like a water gourd; holding my sword firmly I followed close behind [him], and at the Tio nearby I have hung the head of a great man.

== Transportation ==
Rihli is difficult to access due to its remote location. In Myanmar, travelers may use a bus service from Yangon to Monywa in Sagaing Division, from there they can get a 33-seat mini-bus, which is more compatible with the tricky roads of Chin State. Visitors from India can enter from the Indo-Myanmar border gate through Champhai, from where it is 22 kilometres (14 mi). They pay gate-pass fees of Rs. 10 for a person and go directly to the Rih Lake by public buses.
