= Zomi Town, Tulsa =

Ethnic enclave in Tulsa, Oklahoma

Zomi Town Tulsa
- Enclave/Community
- Location in the United States
- Coordinates: 36°07′53″N 95°56′14″W
- Country: United States
- State: Oklahoma
- City: Tulsa
- part of: Burmese American

Population
  - Estimate: 7,000–9,000

Demographic
  - Ethnicity: Zomi
  - Country of origin: Myanmar
  - Religion: Christianity (Baptist, AG)
- zip code: 74133
- Website: zomicommunityusa.org

Zomi Town, Tulsa is an ethnic enclave in Tulsa, Oklahoma, inhabited by approximately 7,000 to 9,000 immigrants from the Zomi ethnic group, who originally hail from the mountainous regions of northwestern Myanmar. The community consists of individuals who sought refuge in the United States to escape religious and political persecution in their homeland. Over time, some residents arrived directly in Tulsa, while others relocated from different states within the U.S.

== Zomi Community USA ==
Headquartered in Tulsa, Zomi Community USA (abbreviated ZIUSA, also known as Zomi Innkuan USA) is a community-based, non-profit organization founded in 2005 that promotes, supports, and advocates for the co-existence, development, and rights of the Zomi ethnic in the United States. As a part of ZIUSA’s activities, the Zomi Conference, also known as Zomi Khawmpi in the native Zomi language, usually takes place every two years. Over the three-day conference, Zomi people across the United States travel to Tulsa to celebrate their culture.

== See also ==
- Burmese diaspora
