= Hrianghmun =

Hrianghmun Hiangmun
- village
- Location in Mizoram, India Hrianghmun (India)
- Coordinates: 23.97147°N 93.293717°E
- Country: India
- State: Mizoram
- District: Champhai
- Block: Ngopa
- Elevation: 1,460 m (4,790 ft)

Population (2011)
  - Total: 583
- Time zone: UTC+5:30 (IST)
- PIN: 796290
- Vehicle registration: MZ-04
- 2011 census code: 271293

Hrianghmun, Originally known as Hiangmun, is a village in the Champhai district of Mizoram, India. The villagers speak Mizo language. It is located in the Ngopa R.D. Block.

== History ==
On 25 January 1945 refugees from the Chindwin River area, the thirty houses of 162 members built Hiangmun in India to escape an outbreak of cholera and the Second World War. Hiangmun is located near Teikhang and was originally administered from there. The village authority name was Taivel. On 9 November 1948 the village construction license was issued by Mangpipa Macdonald.

== Demographics ==
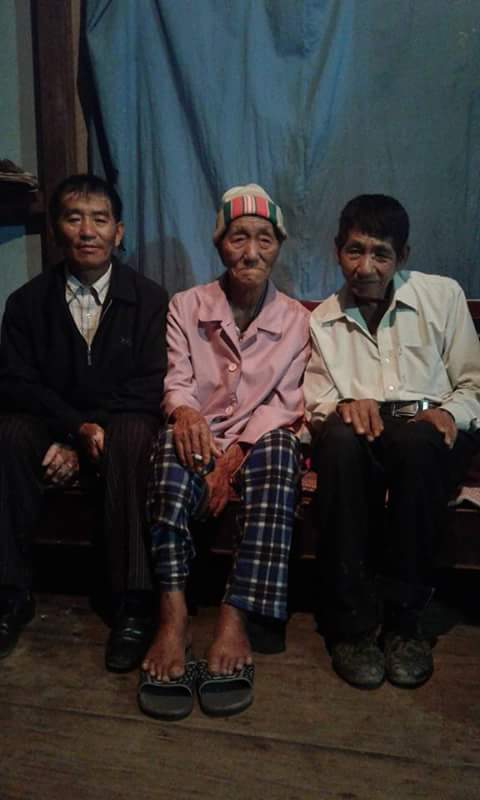
Hiangmun old age 25/7/2016

According to the 2011 census of India, Hrianghmun has 115 households. The effective literacy rate (i.e. the literacy rate of population excluding children aged 6 and below) is 83.9%.

Demographics (2011 Census)
	Total	Male	Female
Population	583	299	284
Children aged below 6 years	111	52	59
Scheduled caste	0	0	0
Scheduled tribe	583	299	284
Literates	396	225	171
Workers (all)	301	151	150
Main workers (total)	293	148	145
Main workers: Cultivators	274	137	137
Main workers: Agricultural labourers	0	0	0
Main workers: Household industry workers	1	0	1
Main workers: Other	18	11	7
Marginal workers (total)	8	3	5
Marginal workers: Cultivators	4	2	2
Marginal workers: Agricultural labourers	0	0	0
Marginal workers: Household industry workers	0	0	0
Marginal workers: Others	4	1	3
Non-workers	282	148	134

=== Religion ===
All the villagers follow Christianity. There are three churches: Zomi Baptist Church, Evangelical Baptist Convention Church, and the Presbyterian Church of India.

== Culture ==
=== Hiangmun Memorial Cup ===
During 18 December 1968 to January 1972, the village was grouped to Mimbung village. Since then, the villagers organised a football tournament in memory of re-construction of the Hiangmun village between Christmas and New year. After the ended of the grouping in 1972, the camped villagers went back to their village and constructed a new Hiangmun within the old village. The younger and the older villagers yearned for their olden days. The poem "Mimbang Pianna Hiangtui Vangkhua" was recited by some young villagers. This poem is the theme song of the memorial cup:

Mimbang pianna Hiangtui
Vangkhua sai bang satna,
Koi kuam albang mang ta a hiam?
Sing gam tuang tung ta hiam?
Vangkhua donleng lei lengthe khuang,
Zolawkta tong kidawng diai diai e.

Zing taikua hong vak ciang,
Sianmang sun ni hong suak;
Vangkhua don leng eng silsial e,
Lungzuan cih teng hong phong,
Mimbang pianna vang khua nuamah
Tun leh zua toh kim a i lenna.

Agam tumin dang e, heina tumin dang ciat,
Khua mun nuam mubang ngailo te,
Lailung zuan mel theilo
Ei aw e, vang khua ngai ve hang!!!
Kholhpih lia leh taang toh zai awihna.

Lailung in gel dih un, sin laiah hong zen lua,
Ei lo zong zang gamah luun ta'n
Vangkhua ngaih siam bang sin;
Mimbang pianna a ngilo te,
Sinlai va bang a mol lai ngei mo!!

Ei sinthu hi lo lawm, vaimang nu sinthu hi;
Khua tuang nusiat zaw ngil kei ni,
I heina peuh ah maw,
Selung zuan tawh nuihciam leel le'ng,
Sianmang'in gual hong zawl ding.

=== Khuado Pawi ===
Khuado Pawi is the most important that Zomi all over the world celebrates every year; which is also called The harvest festival of Zomis in English. This cultural festival features refreshments, traditional & cultural shows, games is a theme of our desire that is building our love, care, an acquaintance among all the Zomi community ..
