= Pialrâl =

Ultimate heaven in Mizo folk myth

Pialrâl (/ˌpiːəlˈrɑːl/) is the ultimate heaven according to the folk myth of the Mizo tribes of Northeast India. The Mizo word literally means "beyond the world". Unlike most concepts of heaven, it is not the final resting place of the spirits of the good and the righteous, nor is there a role for god or any supernaturals; it is simply a reservation for extraordinary achievers during their lifetime to enjoy eternal bliss and luxury.

The concept of Pialrâl itself sums up very well the entire spiritual belief system in the animistic folk religion of the Mizo ancestors. It encompasses not only the spiritual realm, but also all the pathways for entry and services required to attain access. Although the traditional Mizo religion had been completely overshadowed by Christianity since the turn of the 20th century, the notion of Pialrâl still survives as a remnant in a Christian metaphor of paradise among modern Mizos, especially vivid in their songs of praise.

== Theosophy ==
The Mizo ancestors believed in the existence of soul in two worlds beyond life, namely Mitthi Khua (literal translation: "land of the dead") and the higher abode Pialral. It is every human soul's destiny to go to Mitthi Khua, where most would end up eternally, but there is Pialral at the farther realm that is only for the select few. Mitthi Khua is an ordinary spiritual place, where all deceased must eventually enter and the hardships of earthly life will remain, forever.

There is a tendency among modern evangelists and theologians to misinterpret Mitthi Khua and Pialral as synonymous to hell and heaven respectively, but in truth, the similitude is taken out of context. There is no conception of underworld, retribution, relentless suffering, demons or damnation for Mitthi Khua, as is confabulation with hell in most mythology; it is simply an inevitable destiny of all souls regardless of sins or virtues. Nor is Pialral an imperialistic kingdom of god with eternal worship as in other religions, instead it is a place of luxury and comfort for those who have done special deeds in life, called thangchhuah.

The ultimate reward is freedom from labour and being served ready-made food. In fact the quintessential element of Pialrâl is an ever availability of milled rice for eternity (faisa ring, a common metaphorical expression in Mizo even today).

== Passport to Pialrâl ==
Earning the title of thangchhuah is the most prestigious honour in the Mizo life and the only sure route to Pialrâl after death, and to achieve it is no small measure. By the estimate of the achievements imposed, Pialrâl is clearly an under-populated place. There are two ways by which one can accomplish the deed for being a thangchhuah, namely

1. The first called ram lama thangchhuah (that is by hunting exploits) which mandates slaying of at least one enemy and a horde of wild animals, including elephant, bear, wild boar, gaur, sambar deer and barking deer. The bonus kill includes king cobra, crested serpent eagle and red giant flying squirrel, for the greater glory. In addition, there is a lesser daunting task, which is to sleep with a virgin.
2. The other called in lama thangchhuah (that is by domestic deeds) which involves a massively lavish and extravagant ritual. The event is called khuangchawi (meaning "festival" or "celebration") which could only be afforded by the richest people, even by a few chiefs, and should at least last four days. The first day is preparatory involving repair of the host's house, preparation of wine, and milling rice, with an evening dance by all youngsters of the village. The second day is a wine-drinking day, and killing of pigs, of which a boar is for feast of the boys and two sows for sacrifice. The third day is a grand feast for the entire village, and men are expected to get drunk; a bison is used for the feast and a sow is also sacrificed by the best friend. The final day is again a feast day, but mostly of close kith and kin, and the day closes with an evening dance where all the youngsters participated. A concluding feast for all villagers is again necessary, but it can be organised at any convenient time of the year.

The distinctive entitlement of an accomplished thangchhuah family in the village was that they had an open window (no other house ever had a window).

== Journey to Pialrâl ==
When a person dies, as the Mizo believed, the spirit immediately emanates from the body, but does not go directly to Mithi Khua. Instead it roams around until a favourable season, generally after the wet monsoon, around the month of August (in fact August is still traditionally named Thiṭin Thla, meaning "month of the spirit departure"). The bereaved family then prepare thlaichhiah, a ceremony involving animal sacrifice, so that the very spirit of the slain animal will provide and guide on the way. For example, the most commonly used were pig and dog – pig for the meat and dog to guide.

=== Barriers and crossings ===
According to the myth, the spirit heads towards the east onwards to a lake called Rih Dil (a real lake in western Burma). After crossing the lake, the spirit reaches a hill called Hringlang Tlâng, meaning the "hill from where mortals are visible". On this hill is a special spring), the water of which erases mortal memories, hence called "Lungloh Tui" ("water of no more sorrow"). After drinking the water, the spirit plucks the nearby flower called Hawilo Pâr (which means "flower of no looking back") and tucks it to the hair behind the ears. This finally takes away all mortal feelings and worldly longings.

=== Pâwla ===
Then the spirit has to confront a physical test just before entering Mitthi Khua which is a slingshot by a formidable guard named Pâwla. Pâwla is the only supernatural person in the Mizo mythology of afterlife. He is the first human to have died, and he would shoot at all the rank-and-file spirit so that they are doomed to settle in Mitthi Khua and nowhere else. His pellets were so huge that whoever he shot at could be crippled up to three years. However, there are three groups whom Pâwla never shoot at: firstly, the thangchhuah personnel; secondly, a young man who had slept either with three virgins or seven women; lastly, an infant below age.

=== The case of infants ===
The death of an infant before reaching an age is called hlamzuih (hlam meaning "placenta", and zuih meaning "failure" or "end") and was treated differently, rather casually. The infant corpse would be stuffed in an earthen pot, along with a hard-boiled egg and a porcupine quill, and be buried near or under the house. The mother's milk soaked in cotton and a pinch of rice in one hand would be all the food pack required for the journey. The egg was a device for navigation for the otherwise unaware baby and would be expected to roll all the way to Mitthi Khua; and the quill as a weapon of defense.

=== The triumphant entry ===
For the thangchhuah laureate there is no stopping by Pâwla or at the Mitthi Khua, for there is another crossing of a river called Pial, which demarcates the limit of the Mitthi Khua. For the honoured one, Pial is no obstacle. The domestic thangchhuah would be certified by all his sacrifices of pigs and bison. As for the hunter thangchhuah, he would sit on the head of his slain barking deer, holding its horns; the cobra would coil around him to the horn. The eagle leading the way while screaming, and the flying lemur shading him from above. These are the benefits of the bonus kills. The other animals would trail behind as his trophies and prized possession, to the land of unbridled comfort and luxury.
