= Doungel =

Doungel is an Indian surname. Notable people with the surname include:

- Chengjapao Doungel, Thadou chief in Colonial India
- Chungkhokai Doungel (1940/41–2023), Indian politician
- Seiminlen Doungel (born 1994), Indian footballer
