= Vaikhawtlang =

- village
- Location in Mizoram, India Vaikhawtlang (India)
- Coordinates: 23.890955°N 93.371689°E
- Country: India
- State: Mizoram
- District: Champhai
- Block: Champhai
- Elevation: 875 m (2,871 ft)

Population (2011)
  - Total: 938
- Time zone: UTC+5:30 (IST)
- 2011 census code: 271339

Vaikhawtlang is a remote Mizo village in Champhai district, Mizoram, India.

== Demographics ==
According to the 2011 census of India, Vaikhawtlang has 168 households. The effective literacy rate (i.e. the literacy rate of population excluding children aged 6 and below) is 94.29%.

Demographics (2011 Census)
| | Total | Male | Female |
|---|---|---|---|
| Population | 938 | 475 | 463 |
| Children aged below 6 years | 185 | 92 | 93 |
| Scheduled caste | 0 | 0 | 0 |
| Scheduled tribe | 935 | 475 | 460 |
| Literates | 710 | 376 | 334 |
| Workers (all) | 387 | 223 | 164 |
| Main workers (total) | 378 | 220 | 158 |
| Main workers: Cultivators | 327 | 181 | 146 |
| Main workers: Agricultural labourers | 5 | 4 | 1 |
| Main workers: Household industry workers | 1 | 0 | 1 |
| Main workers: Other | 45 | 35 | 10 |
| Marginal workers (total) | 9 | 3 | 6 |
| Marginal workers: Cultivators | 8 | 2 | 6 |
| Marginal workers: Agricultural labourers | 0 | 0 | 0 |
| Marginal workers: Household industry workers | 0 | 0 | 0 |
| Marginal workers: Others | 1 | 1 | 0 |
| Non-workers | 551 | 252 | 299 |
