= Mimbung =

- village
- Location in Mizoram, India Mimbung (India)
- Coordinates: 23.9996395°N 93.2854006°E
- Country: India
- State: Mizoram
- District: Champhai
- Block: Ngopa
- Elevation: 1,421 m (4,662 ft)

Population (2011)
  - Total: 1,990
- Time zone: UTC+5:30 (IST)
- 2011 census code: 271292

Mimbung is a village in the Saitual district of Mizoram, India. It is located in the Ngopa R.D. Block.

== Demographics ==
According to the 2011 census of India, Mimbung has 357 households. The effective literacy rate (i.e. the literacy rate of population excluding children aged 6 and below) is 95.07%.

Demographics (2011 Census)
	Total	Male	Female
Population	1990	1021	969
Children aged below 6 years	305	145	160
Scheduled caste	0	0	0
Scheduled tribe	1985	1018	967
Literates	1602	850	752
Workers (all)	960	505	455
Main workers (total)	947	499	448
Main workers: Cultivators	840	423	417
Main workers: Agricultural labourers	4	2	2
Main workers: Household industry workers	10	5	5
Main workers: Other	93	69	24
Marginal workers (total)	13	6	7
Marginal workers: Cultivators	0	0	0
Marginal workers: Agricultural labourers	5	2	3
Marginal workers: Household industry workers	4	2	2
Marginal workers: Others	4	2	2
Non-workers	1030	516	514
