= Valte =

Valte is a surname. Notable people with the surname include:

- Abigail Valte (born 1980), Philippine political spokesman
- Vungzagin Valte (1964–2026), Indian politician
