= Tonzang =

Tonzang Tonzang khuapi
- Town
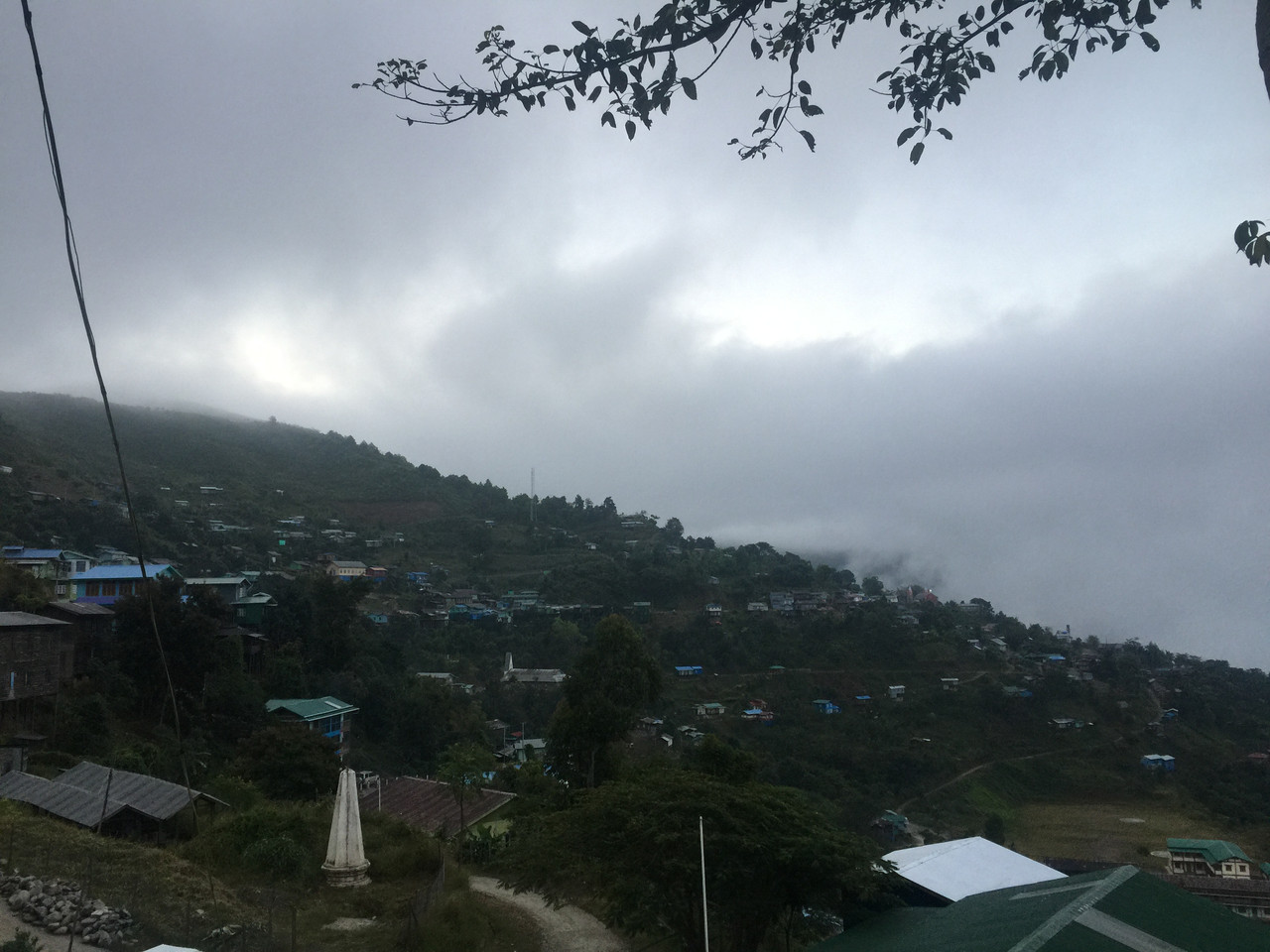
- A cloudy morning in Tonzang

- Location in Burma
- Coordinates: 23°36′N 93°42′E
- Country: Myanmar
- Division: Chin State
- District: Tedim District
- Township: Tonzang Township
- Elevation: 5,269 ft (1,606 m)

Population (2024)
  - Total: c. 8,000
  - Ethnicities: Zomi Chin
  - Religions: Christianity
- Time zone: UTC+6.30 (MST)

Tonzang is a town and the administrative seat of Tonzang Township in Chin State, Myanmar. Tonzang is the second most populous town in Tedim District of Chin State. The town is located in the Chin Hills at 5,269 feet (1,606 m) above sea level.

== History ==
In 1905, Baptist missionaries established a school in Tonzang.

In July 2015, extensive rainfall from Cyclone Komen triggered a record-breaking landslide, measuring a length of 3.6 miles (5.8 km) that struck Tonzang. Picked up by an Earth-observing satellite, it was one of the largest landslides not caused by an earthquake that scientists had observed in a decade.

During the country's ongoing civil war, the town was captured by the Chin National Army on 19 May 2024. It was recaptured by the Tatmadaw and Zomi Revolutionary Army Eastern Command on 19 May 2026.

== Notable people ==
- Thawn Kham, a Zomi Burmese singer. Some of his popular songs are Tuhun Zomi, Zogam Aw, Nang Lo-in, and Thangho Leh Liando.
