= Kawlbem =

- village
- Location in Mizoram, India Kawlbem (India)
- Coordinates: 23.8699945°N 93.3055316°E
- Country: India
- State: Mizoram
- District: Champhai
- Block: Ngopa
- Elevation: 1,500 m (4,900 ft)

Population (2011)
  - Total: 1,479
- Time zone: UTC+5:30 (IST)
- 2011 census code: 271295

Kawlbem is a Paite village in the Saitual district of Mizoram, India. It is located in the Ngopa R.D. Block.

== Demographics ==
According to the 2011 census of India, Kawlbem has 268 households. The effective literacy rate (i.e. the literacy rate of population excluding children aged 6 and below) is 87.01%.

Demographics (2011 Census)
	Total	Male	Female
Population	1479	735	744
Children aged below 6 years	332	164	168
Scheduled caste	0	0	0
Scheduled tribe	1451	721	730
Literates	998	522	476
Workers (all)	682	364	318
Main workers (total)	679	362	317
Main workers: Cultivators	591	304	287
Main workers: Agricultural labourers	5	2	3
Main workers: Household industry workers	2	2	0
Main workers: Other	81	54	27
Marginal workers (total)	3	2	1
Marginal workers: Cultivators	1	0	1
Marginal workers: Agricultural labourers	1	1	0
Marginal workers: Household industry workers	0	0	0
Marginal workers: Others	1	1	0
Non-workers	797	371	426
