= Tedim Township =

Tedim Township တီးတိန်မြို့နယ်
- Township
- Tedim Township (Red) in Tedim District
- Coordinates: 23°23′N 93°42′E
- Country: Myanmar
- State: Chin State
- District: Tedim District
- Township: Tedim Township
- Administrative centre: Tedim

Area
  - Total: 949.7 sq mi (2,459.7 km^{2})

Population (2014)
  - Total: 87,623
  - Density: 92.264/sq mi (35.623/km^{2})
- Time zone: UTC+6:30 (MST)

Tedim Township (Burmese: တီးတိန်မြို့နယ်) is in Tedim District, Chin State of Myanmar (Burma). The administrative centre for the township is the town of Tedim. It is the most populous township in Chin State, with a population of 87,623.

== Borders ==
- Tonzang Township to the north;
- Mizoram State of India to the west;
- Falam Township to the south;
- Kalay Township to the east.

== History ==
=== 20th century ===
On 12 February 1947, Pu Thawng Za Khup of Tedim from the Chin Committee signed Panglong Agreement to form a Union of Burma.

In 1995, there were 237 clans and families in the Tedim region.

=== Myanmar civil war ===
Since the outbreak of civil war in 2021, Tedim Township has been the site of clashes between the Myanmar military (Tatmadaw) and armed resistance groups.

==== 2023 Taingen Skirmish ====
Since 2022, the Tatmadaw has stationed troops in Taingen village in Tedim Township. Taingen is near the Indian border. According to Chin ethnic armed organizations (EAOs), junta troops had detained, raped and killed several villagers in Taingen. The camp is, according to members of the Chin National Army (CNA) interviewed by Myanmar Peace Monitor, compact with "high-quality bunkers".

On 11 July 2023, junta forces at Taingen were attacked by the joint force of the Chinland Defense Force (CDF), People's Defense Force (Zoland and Kalay), Chin National Defence Force, and the Tahan Civil Defense Force. Taingen was defended by 50-60 junta soldiers, with junta reinforcements from Kalay providing heavy weapons support alongside the Air Force using its jet fighters. The skirmish resulted in the death of four PDF members.

==== 2024 Battle of Taingen ====
On 12 January 2024, the junta base at Taingen was attacked by the CNA, Civic Defense Militia Siyin, and the CDFs. The base was being defended by 30 soldiers and 25 police officers. Fighting lasted for five days until 16 January, and involved junta forces shelling and using airstrikes against the attacking EAOs from their position in Kalay. The EAOs, however, killed the majority of the junta forces using drone bombs. According to Salai Lian Bawi, spokesman of the [ Civic Defense Militia Siyin], the joint Chin force had repeatedly phoned the junta forces to surrender, but they refused and all died. Casualties on the Chin's side were a total of eight - one for the CNA, and seven for the CDF. The joint force also suffered the loss of four drones, each worth around 90 million kyat.

Taingen is located on Union Road, which acts as a gateway to towns in northern Chin state and is important to India-Myanmar trade. Following their victory, the Chin forces plan to open the road that runs to Kalay, which the junta closed for two months.

2024 Muallum Battle

On 1 May 2024, CNA and its allies attacked ZRA-EC Camp in Muallum, Tedim Township, Chin State. In this battle, it has been confirmed that 1 ZRA-EC soldier and 2 CNA soldiers were killed.

== Villages ==
There are 55 village-tracts and 132 villages as of 2011. Major villages include (with village census id number):

- Akluai (217947) in Laibung Village Tract
- Buanman (164716) in Buanman Village Tract
- Dakdungh (164733) in Buan Village Tract
- Laibung (164736) in Laibung Village Tract
- Laaitui (164670) in Laaitui Village Tract
- Mualbeem (164730) in Mualbeem Village Tract
- Tuisau (164737) in Laibung Village Tract
- Tuithang (164680) in Tuithang Village Tract
- Tuizang (164735) in Vingpi Village Tract
- Tungzang Village (164681) in Tungzang Village Tract
- Vangteh (164726) in Vangteh Village Tract
- Vingpi (164734) in Vingpi Village Tract

== Economy ==
=== Mining ===
- Mwetaung mine

== Bibliography ==
- Sing Khaw Khai (1995). Zo People and Their Culture. Khampu Hatzaw. LCCN 96905260.
