= Sukte clan =

Clan of the Kuki people

The Sukte are one of the clans of Tedim Chins (also called "Zomi") that mainly inhabit the Tedim District in Myanmar, with small numbers in India, in Manipur, Meghalaya and Assam states. They are recognized as a Scheduled Tribe in Manipur. Since 1995, they have been part of the Zomi Re-unification Organisation in Manipur.

== Social status ==
They were listed as Salhte in the 1947 Constitution where they are among the groups given Adivasi status. They are commonly referred to as the Zo by others, but they use the name Sukte for themselves.

== Population ==
Only five people were counted in this ethnic group in the 1981 census. However, the leader of the youth group for the Zomi claims there are 3,500 Sukte currently. The Sukte are agriculturalists, growing primarily maize and rice. They are mainly Christian in religion.

== Notable people ==
- Pau Cin Hau, founder of Laipian

== See also ==
- Sukte language
