= Tedim District =

District in Chin State, Myanmar

Coordinates: 23°34′N 93°42′E

- District
- Tedim District (Red) in Chin State.
- Country: Myanmar
- State: Chin State
- District: Tedim District
- Capital: Tedim
- Language: Teddim/Chin languages
- Established: 2022

Area
  - Total: 5,983 km^{2} (2,310 sq mi)

Population (2014)
  - Total: 117,393
  - Density: 19.62/km^{2} (50.82/sq mi)
- Time zone: MST

Tedim District is a district in Chin State, Myanmar with a population of 117,393 (combining Tedim and Tonzang townships) according to the Myanmar Census 2014, making it the most populous district in Chin State. On 1 May 2022, Tedim District was formed with Tedim and Tonzang townships. Its district seat is Tedim. The major towns are Tedim, Tonzang, Cikha, and Khaikam.

== Townships ==
Townships in Tedim District:

- Tedim Township
- Tonzang Township
- Cikha Sub-township

== Borders ==
Tedim District borders:

- Manipur State of India to the north;
- Mizoram State of India to the west;
- Falam District of Chin State to the south;
- Kalay District of Sagaing Division to the east.
- Tamu District of Sagaing Division to the northeast.

== Festivals ==
- Kum Thak (New Year's Day)
- Zomi Nam Ni (Chin National Day)
- Sial Sawm Pawi or Lawm Annek
- Khuado Pawi
- Lungdam Pawi (Merry Christmas)

== History ==
On 12 February 1947, Pu Thawng Za Khup of Tedim from Chin Committee signed Panglong Agreement to formed a Union of Burma. After Burma Independent, Chin Special Division (now Chin State) was formed with Falam District and Mindat District. On 1 May 2022, Tedim District was formed.

== Notable people ==
- Pu Cin Sian Thang (6 April 1938 – 31 July 2021) was a politician. He was a chairman of Zomi Congress for Democracy
- Pu Gin Kam Lian is a politician. He is currently the Chairman of Zomi Congress for Democracy.
- Suan Lam Mang is a football player, who plays as a forward for Thai League 2 club Pattaya United and Myanmar national football team
