= Tonzang Township =

Township in Chin State, Myanmar

Tonzang Township တွန်းဇံမြို့နယ်
- Tonzang Township (Red)
- Location (red) in Tedim District
- Coordinates: 23°45′N 93°44′E
- Country: Myanmar
- State: Chin State
- District: Tedim District
- Township: Tonzang Township
- Administrative centre: Tonzang

Area
  - Total: 1,340.25 sq mi (3,471.24 km^{2})

Population (2014)
  - Total: 20,722
  - Density: 15.461/sq mi (5.9696/km^{2})
  - Religions: Christianity
- Time zone: UTC+6:30 (MST)

Tonzang Township (Burmese: တွန်းဇံမြို့နယ်) is a township in Tedim District, Chin State of Myanmar. The 3,471.24-square-kilometre Tonzang Township is bordered by Tedim Township in the south, Kale Township of the Sagaing Division in the south-east, Tamu Township of the Sagaing Division in the north-east, the Indian states of Manipur in the north and Mizoram in the west. The township is primarily inhabited by Zomi and Zomi people. The capital of the township is Tonzang.

== History ==
On 11-12 May 2024, amid the Myanmar civil war, the Tatmadaw launched airstrikes in Tonzang Township destroying homes, a Baptist church, and a Catholic church.

On 3 April 2025, the Zomi Revolutionary Army (ZRA) burned down around 80 homes in Nakzang village, Tonzang Township.

== Administrative divisions ==
The capital city of Tonzang Township is Tonzang. Tonzang Township is divided into 32 regions called villages:

- Anlun
- Balbil
- Bapi
- Buangmual
- Cikha (Urban)
- Darkhai (A)
- Gelmual
- Haicin
- Haipi
- Hangken
- Kampum
- Kansau
- Khuabem
- Lamthang
- Linhnuat
- Lungtak
- Mualpi
- Nakzang
- Pangmual
- Phaitu
- Saipimual
- Salzang
- Sebawk
- Senam
- Singpial
- Sipek
- Suangpek
- Suangzang
- Thuitum
- Tongcin
- Tonzang (Urban)
- Tuimang
- Tuimui
- Tungtuang
- Zampi

== Demographics ==
According to the 2014 Myanmar census, Tonzang Township had a population of 20,722. The median age was reported to be 17.5 years old. There were 95 males per 100 females, and males had a higher literacy rate than females at 93.1% and 81.8%, respectively. The 3,411 households had a mean household size of 5.9 persons. The majority of the households used firewood rather than electricity for cooking.

== Education ==
In June 2026, 44 schools reopened in the township, with 3,446 students enrolled.
