= Teikhang =

- village
- Location in Mizoram, India Teikhang (India)
- Coordinates: 23.9495253°N 93.3023856°E
- Country: India
- State: Mizoram
- District: Champhai
- Block: Ngopa
- Elevation: 1,531 m (5,023 ft)

Population (2011)
  - Total: 1,744
- Time zone: UTC+5:30 (IST)
- PIN: 796290
- 2011 census code: 271294

Teikhang is a Mizo village in the Saitual district of Mizoram, India. It is located in the Ngopa R.D. Block.

== Precipitation ==
Before the starting date and after 6 November 2015, no rainfall had been recorded. So, during this year, the rainfall can be estimated from the above data only. Calculation: Average rainfall per month = = 490.83 ml per month

== Demographics ==
According to the 2011 census of India, Teikhang has 325 households. The effective literacy rate (i.e. the literacy rate of population excluding children aged 6 and below) is 87.35%.

Demographics (2011 Census)
	Total	Male	Female
Population	1744	868	876
Children aged below 6 years	337	180	157
Scheduled caste	0	0	0
Scheduled tribe	1725	859	866
Literates	1229	629	600
Workers (all)	893	455	438
Main workers (total)	850	434	416
Main workers: Cultivators	750	382	368
Main workers: Agricultural labourers	11	4	7
Main workers: Household industry workers	20	6	14
Main workers: Other	69	42	27
Marginal workers (total)	43	21	22
Marginal workers: Cultivators	23	16	7
Marginal workers: Agricultural labourers	1	0	1
Marginal workers: Household industry workers	6	0	6
Marginal workers: Others	13	5	8
Non-workers	851	413	438
