= Pau Cin Hau =

Burmese religious leader

- Title: Laipianpa ('the script creator')

Personal life
- Born: 1859 Tedim, Chin State, Myanmar
- Died: 1948 (aged 88–89)

Religious life
- Religion: Laipianism
- Founder of: Laipianism

Pau Cin Hau was the founder and the name of a religion followed by some in Chin State and Sagaing Division in the north-western part of Myanmar.

Pau Cin Hau was born in the Tedim (Tiddim) in 1859 and lived until 1948.

== Religion ==
He claimed to have a series of dreams in 1900 in which an elderly, saintly man, later identified as the creator god, handed him a book with symbols and taught him certain shapes. He started a religious movement based on the worship of a god known as Pasian, Patyen, or Pathian (the word for "god" in the Tedim language). While earlier traditional Chin religion sacrificed to the tribal god Khozing/Khuazing and other dawi spirits (similar to the Burmese nat), from 1902, Pau Cin Hau reserved the sacrifices to one creator god. Initially, the Chin people accepted neither Pau Cin Hau's religion nor Christianity, which arrived in 1899. The first Christian conversion was in 1904, and Pau Cin Hau got his first follower in 1906. By the 1930s, all the Chin followed either Christianity or Pau Cin Hau's monotheism. The missionaries rejected the traditional alcoholic drink (zu), contrasting with its permission by Pau Cin Hau.

It can be said that Pau Cin Hau's preaching opened the Chin to Christianity in spite of the differences among religions. Pathian became the name for the Christian god. Missionaries did not agree whether Pau Cin Hau's preaching was an introduction or an obstacle to Christianization. Some scholars have considered it a local version of Christianity, but others have noted the differences and Pau Cin Hau's opposition.

The religion is outlined in six books Bu written in Pau Cin Hau script. It is framed as healing in a physical and spiritual way. It entails faith in Pathian and practicing "justice, harmony, discipline, peace and hygiene". It has passed from 37,500 followers in 1931 to around 5,000 in 2024. Christianity and the Latin script have been adopted by the majority of the Chin.

Pau Cin Hau's religion is also known as Laipian ('script religion') and Laipianism, and Pau Cin Hau is also known as Laipianpa ('script religion creator').

He also invented two scripts based on the revealed shapes, known as Tual lai ('local script') or Zotuallai, now called "Zotuallai". The initial 1902 version was logographic and a later version is an alphabet. The script is not only a vehicle for the message but also an icon of the religion.

== See also ==
- Pau Cin Hau script
