= Zo peoples =

Ethnolinguistic group in Myanmar, Bangladesh, and northeast India

Zo people
- Mizo: Zohnahthlak or Zofa
- Paite-Tedim: Zosuante or Zota
- Thadou–Kuki: Zosuonte or Zocha
- Chin Hakha Lai: Zopuan
- Mara: Zochia or Zophei
- Laitu Chin: Zohtla or Zohta

Regions with significant populations
- Bangladesh, India, Myanmar

Languages
- Kuki-Chin languages

Religion
- Majority: Christianity; Minority: Judaism; Buddhism; Islam

Related ethnic groups
- Halam tribe, Karbi people, Kom-rem

The Zo people (Note: also known as Kuki-Chin-Mizo people) is a term to denote the ethnolinguistically related speakers of the Kuki-Chin languages who primarily inhabit northeastern India, western Myanmar, and southeastern Bangladesh.

The dispersal across international borders resulted from a British colonial policy that drew borders on political, rather than ethnic, grounds.

== Ethnonyms ==
Beginning in the 1990s, the generic name Chin has been rejected by some for "Zomi", a name used by a group speaking Northern Kuki languages. The speakers of the Northern Kuki languages are sometimes lumped together as the Zomi's. Some Zomi nationalists have stated that the use of the label Chin would mean subtle domination by Burmese groups.

In 2023, during the Manipur violence, the Kuki tribes of Manipur were referred to as Kuki-Zo. Before, it was specifically only Kuki in the context of Manipur, Assam, Nagaland, and Tripura.

== Origin ==
The Zo people trace their ancestry to the Tibeto-Burman family, migrating from China, possibly near Tibet, thousands of years ago. They settled in the mountainous regions of Southeast Asia and developed distinct linguistic and cultural identities. The term "Zo" is believed to mean "highlander" or "people of the hills." It may have also originated from a progenitor of the same name.

== Zo subgroups ==
The Zo people, also known as the Kuki-Chin-Mizo group, comprise various tribes primarily inhabiting northeastern India, western Myanmar, and southeastern Bangladesh. These tribes share linguistic and cultural similarities, speaking languages from the Kuki-Chin branch of the Tibeto-Burman family.

Below are some of the prominent subgroups among the Zo people:

- Mizo people: Primarily residing in Mizoram, India, the Mizo are known for their rich cultural heritage and traditional dances. The word Mizo literally means a Zo person (Mi = person)
- Kuki people: Kuki people are an ethnic group primarily residing in the northeastern states of India—notably Manipur, Nagaland, Mizoram, Assam, and Tripura—as well as in Myanmar and parts of Bangladesh.
- Hmar people: Found in the Indian states of Manipur, Mizoram, and Assam, the Hmar people have a distinct language and cultural practices.
- Zomi people: The term Zomi literally means “Zo people” (mi meaning people), and reflects their shared cultural, linguistic, and historical heritage within the broader Zo identity. However, presently it does not refer to the whole Zo Community. They inhabit parts of Chin State in Myanmar, Manipur and Mizoram in India, and to a lesser extent, Bangladesh.
- Zotung people: Zotung people primarily reside in Chin State, Myanmar. They are ethnically and culturally distinct from nearby tribes, though they share certain historical and cultural ties.
- Lai people: Primarily inhabiting central Chin State, Myanmar and parts of Mizoram, India, the Lai are a populous subgroup of the Zo people.
- Chin people: Residing mainly in the Chin State of Myanmar, the Chin people encompass various sub-groups with diverse languages and cultures.

== Geography ==
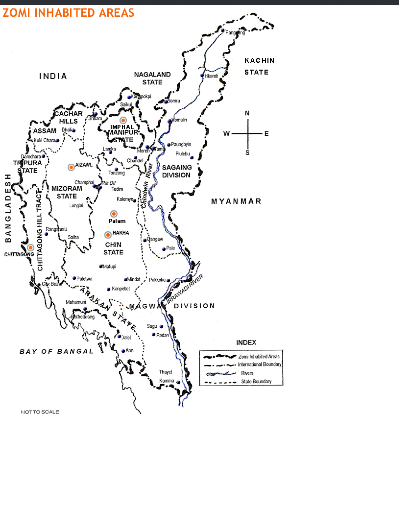
Zo inhabited areas

They are spread out in the contiguous regions of Northeast India, Northwest Burma (Myanmar), and the Chittagong Hill Tracts in Bangladesh. In India, they are most prominent in Manipur, Nagaland, Assam and Mizoram. Some fifty Kuki/Zo peoples are recognised as scheduled tribes.

== Religion ==
Traditionally, Zo people followed animism and practiced ancestral worship.

In the 19th century, Christian missionaries converted many Zo people to Christianity, and today, Christianity (mostly Protestant) is the dominant religion among them. Minorities practice Buddhism, Judaism or indigenous beliefs.

== See also ==
- Sinlung
- Leen Nupa
- Kennedy Peak (Myanmar)
- Rih Lake
- Zo diaspora
- Zo nationalism
