= Tedim =

Tedim Tedim Khuapi (Tedim Chin) Tiddim Town (English) တီးတိန်မြို့ (Burmese)
- Town
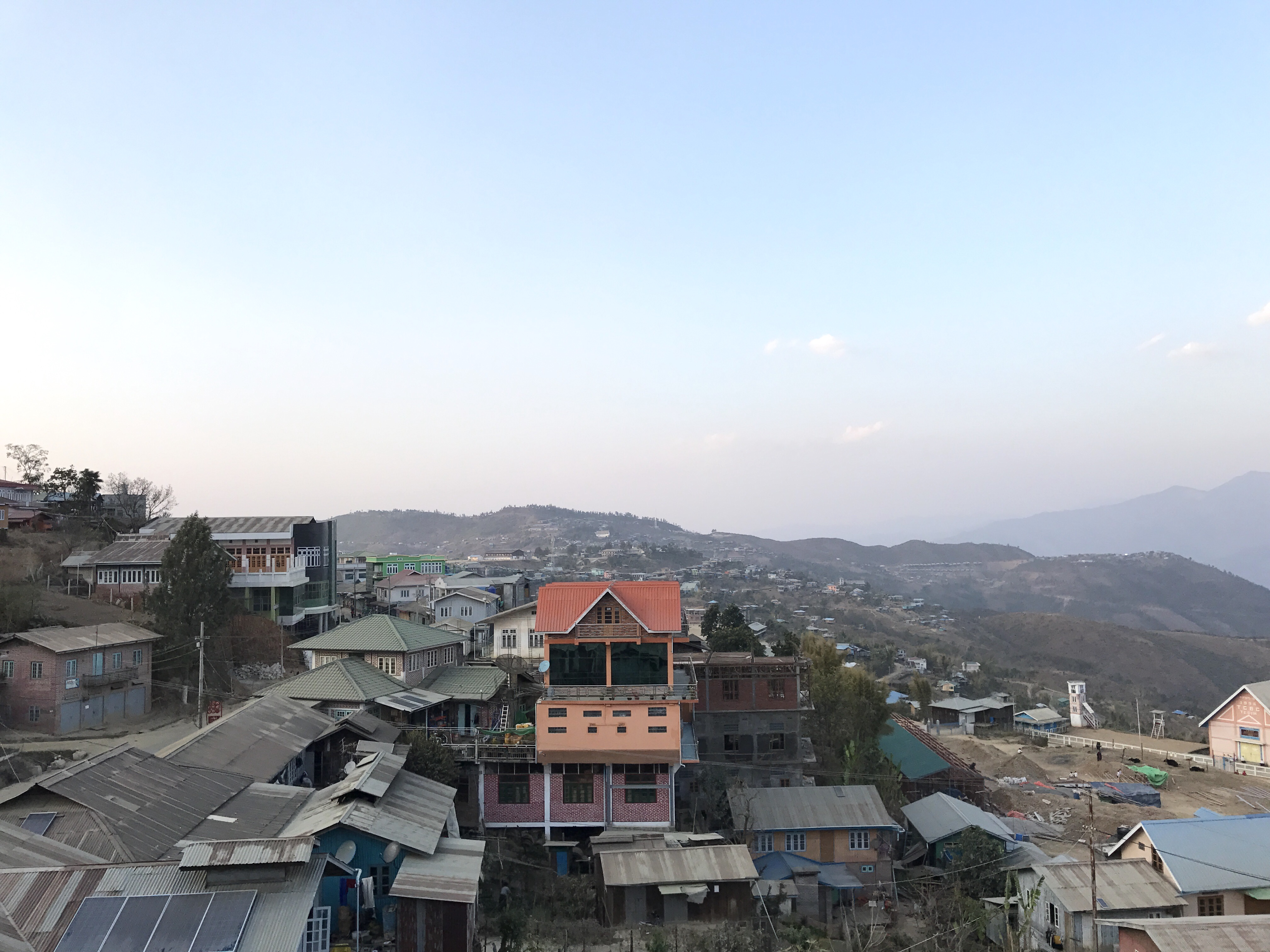
- Tedim Town before dusk

- Location in Burma
- Coordinates: 23.3745°N 93.6535°E
- Country: Myanmar
- State: Chin State
- District: Tedim District
- Township: Tedim Township
- Elevation: 3,711 ft (1,131 m)

Population (2020)
  - Total: 20,000
  - Religions: Christian 93% Laipian 5% other 2%
- Time zone: UTC+6:30 (MST)

Tedim (Note: Burmese: တီးတိန်မြို့, MLCTS: ti: tin mrui., pronounced [títeɪ̀ɰ̃ mjo̰]; Tedim Chin: Tedim Khuapi, pronounced [ˈtɛdiːm ˈxɔp.piː]; also spelled Tiddim) is a town and the administrative seat of Tedim Township in Chin State, Myanmar. It is the second largest town in Chin State, after Hakha (the capital city of Chin State). The town's four major boroughs (veng) are: Sakollam, Myoma, Lawibual and Leilum.

== History ==
The name "Tedim" is derived from a pool in the hills that used to twinkle in the sunlight. Therefore it was called te-dim (twinkling, shiny) in the local Tedim language (which is also called "Tedim pau").

As the Zomi lacked a formal writing system in the past, the story of Tedim mostly depends on oral tradition. The establishment of Tedim is ascribed to Gui Mang II, a powerful prince from the then ruling Guite family in the region (c. 1600). However, due to the untimely death of Gui Lun (the fifth generation from Gui Mang II), Tedim was deserted for two generations. By the time of Pum Go, Tedim was reestablished as the political base of the Guite family. At the time of Mang Suum II, son of Pum Go, the allied force of the Pawihangs began their advance in the region and attacked Tedim. Tedim was again abandoned by many, though some local residents remained under the leadership of Mang Gin from the Hatlangh family. In 1840, in order to secure peace, the remaining citizens invited the leadership of Kam Hau of Mualbem, of the emerging Sukte family, since they had good military and political ties with the Zahau family of the Pawis.

When British rule began in 1824, Tedim was chosen as the local residence for the District Officer.

== Geography ==
The ranges of Hills of Thangmual include Kennedy's Peak, Lunglenkawl, the Rih Bual, the Hausapi, the Gullu Mual, the Zangmualli, the Tuikangpi, the Suangsuang, and the Lentangmual. There are dams, caves, peaks, and other attractions, including Lennupa Mual, the Twin Fairy Hill and other historic sites.

== Religion ==
The primary religions practiced in Tedim consist of Christianity, Laipianism, and Judaism. Historically, residents followed a form of animism.

== Notable people ==
- Pau Cin Hau, founder of the religion Laipian and the Pau Cin Hau script (Zo tual lai).
