= Zomi people =

Group of people in India and Myanmar

Zomi is a collective identity adopted by some of the Kuki-Chin language-speaking people in India and Myanmar. The term means "Zo people". The groups adopting the Zomi identity reject the conventional labels "Kuki" and "Chin", popularised during the British Raj, as colonial impositions. Even though "Zomi" was originally coined as an all-encompassing identity of the Kuki-Chin-speaking people, in practice, it has proved to be divisive, with a considerable number of groups continuing to use the traditional labels "Kuki" and "Chin" and only certain sections adopting the Zomi identity. The groups covered in the identity have varied with time. Compound names such as "Kuki-Zo" and "Zomi Chin" are sometimes used to paper over the divisions.

== Etymology ==
The term "Zomi" combines the ancestral name "Zo" with "mi", meaning people.

== Evolution of the identity ==
The Zo identity for the Kuki-Chin language-speaking people, spread across Northeast India and Myanmar's Chin State, began to take shape soon after World War II. The people of the then Lushai Hills district in India (present-day Mizoram) rallied behind a "Mizo" ("Zo people") identity in 1946. In 1953, the Baptist Associations of Tedim, Falam and Hakha in Myanmar's Chin State adopted Zomi ("Zo people") as their "national" name (subsuming the various tribal identities). In India's Manipur state, T. Gougin formed the "United Zomi Organisation" in 1961 and "Zomi National Congress" in 1972. The final step in these Zomi nationalist movements was taken in April 1993, when a Zomi Re-unification Organisation (ZRO) was formed at Phapian in Kachin State of Myanmar, under the leadership of Tedim Chins and Paites. It had the professed objective of unifying all the Kuki-Zo people divided across national borders (India, Myanmar and Bangladesh) under a united "Zomi" identity.

With these antecedents, seven Kuki-Zo tribes of Churachandpur district in Manipur, that had previously declined to accept a Kuki identity, agreed to come under the banner of Zomi Re-unification Organisation in 1995. The seven tribes were Hmar, Zou, Vaiphei, Gangte, Simte, Sukte (Tedim Chins) and Paite, with the Paites leading the collection. Its formation day is said to be observed on 20 February every year as Zomi Nam Ni. (Note: Zomi Nam Ni is translated as "Zomi national day". Its celebration started in the Churachandpur town around 1994–1995. However, it was already being celebrated in Chin State to mark the day when Chins switched to a democratic system of administration on 20 February 1948, dispensing with traditional chieftaincies. Starting out as "Chin National Day", the event is said to have been renamed as "Zomi National Day" in 1950.) By 1997, the organisation also formed an underground military wing called Zomi Revolutionary Army (ZRA) ostensibly to defend the tribes under its umbrella from rival tribes, mainly the Thadou Kukis.

During 1997–1998, serious Kuki–Paite clashes developed in the Churachandpur district of Manipur, killing 350 people and displacing 13,000 people. At the end of the conflict, the Hmar and Gangte tribes left the Zomi group, leaving only five tribes in the collection.

== Diaspora ==
As of 2025, people identifying as Zomi form the second-largest ethnic group in the Burmese diaspora in the United States. Between 7,000 and 9,000 Zomi live in Tulsa, Oklahoma, which is referred to as "Zomi Town" within the Burmese diaspora. The concentration of Zomi in Tulsa is related to the fact that the Zomi are a largely Christian ethnic group and have faced persecution in Myanmar under the military dictatorship. The resettlement of Zomi refugees to Tulsa was in part catalyzed by Dr. Chin Do Kham, who moved to Tulsa in the 1970s to study at Oral Roberts University, a Christian institution in southern Tulsa. Zomi communities are also present in the United Kingdom, Canada, Australia, Sweden, Germany, and Japan.

== See also ==
- Zo people
- Zomi nationalism
- Zogam
- Zomia

== Bibliography ==
- Go, Khup Za (2008), Zo Chronicles: A Documentary Study of History and Culture of the Kuki-Chin-Lushai Tribe, Mittal Publications, ISBN 9788183242103
- Haokip, Rebecca C. (2007). "The Kuki-Paite Conflict in the Churachandpur District of Manipur". In Lazar Jeyaseelan (ed.). Conflict Mapping and Peace Processes in North East India (PDF). North Eastern Social Research Centre. pp. 185–207. Archived from the original (PDF) on 18 December 2023.
- Rammohan, E. N. (April–June 2002), "Blueprint for Counterinsurgency in Manipur", The Journal of the United Services Institution of India, CXXXII, archived from the original on 15 February 2024
- Suan, H. Kham Khan (2011), "Rethinking 'tribe' identities: The politics of recognition among the Zo in north-east India", Contributions to Indian Sociology, 45 (2): 157–187, doi:10.1177/006996671104500201
- Zou, David Vumlallian (3–9 April 2010), "A Historical Study of the 'Zo' Struggle", Economic and Political Weekly, 45 (14): 56–63, JSTOR 25664306
- Zou, S. Thangboi (2012), "Emergent Micro-National Communities: The Logic of Kuki-Chin Armed Struggle in Manipur", Strategic Analysis, 36 (2): 315–327, doi:10.1080/09700161.2012.646509
- Choudhury, Sanghamitra (2016), Women and Conflict in India, Routledge, ISBN 9781317553625
- Thangsuanhau, P.; Jamkhanpau, V. (2013). "Zomi Diaspora, Culture And Politics". Journal of Tribal Intellectual Collective India. 1 (2). ISSN 2321-5437.
