= Tedim language =

Kuki-Chin language spoken in Burma and India

Tedim
- Tedim Chin
- Zopau, Tedim pau, Zomi
- Native to: Myanmar, India
- Region: Chin State and Sagaing Division of Myanmar; Manipur State and Mizoram State of India
- Ethnicity: Tedim, Zomi, Chin
- Native speakers: (340,000 cited 1990)
- Language family: Sino-Tibetan: Tibeto-Burman; Kuki-Chin; Northeastern Chin; Tedim
- Writing system: Latin; Pau Cin Hau script

Language codes
- ISO 639-3: ctd
- Glottolog: tedi1235
- ELP: Tiddim Chin

A Tedim speaker, recorded in Myanmar

The Tedim language (also called Zo or Zopau) is a Kuki-Chin language spoken mostly in the southern Indo-Burmese border. It is the native language of the Tedim tribe of the Zomi people, and a form of standardized dialect merging from the Sukte and Kamhau dialects. It is a subject–object–verb language, and negation follows the verb. It is primarily written in Latin script and is mutually intelligible with the Paite language.

== History ==
Christian missionaries translated the New Testament into the Tedim language in 1932.

Tedim was the primary language spoken by Pau Cin Hau, a religious leader who lived from 1859 to 1948. He also devised a logographic and later simplified alphabetic script for writing materials in Zomi.

== Phonology ==
The phonology of Tedim can be described as (C)V(V)(C)T order, where C represents a consonant, V represents a vowel, T represents a tone, and parentheses enclose optional constituents of a syllable.

=== Consonants ===
		Labial	Alveolar	Alveolo- palatal	Velar	Glottal
Plosive/ Affricate	voiceless	p	t	tɕ	k	ʔ
Plosive/ Affricate	aspirated	pʰ	tʰ	tɕʰ	(kʰ)	
Plosive/ Affricate	voiced	b	d		ɡ	
Fricative	voiceless	f	s		x	h
Fricative	voiced	v	z			
Nasal		m	n		ŋ	
Approximant			l			lˀ

- Approximants [j, w] can be heard as allophones of vowels /i̯, u̯/ within diphthongs.
- /x/ can also be heard as an aspirated velar stop [kʰ] in free variation.

=== Vowels ===
	Front	Central	Back
Close	i iː		u uː
Mid	ɛ ɛː		ɔ ɔː
Open		a aː	

Diphthongs
	Front	Central	Back
Close	iu̯ i̯a		ui̯ uːi̯ u̯a
Mid	ei̯ ɛːi̯ eu̯ ɛːu̯		ou̯ oi̯ ɔːi̯
Open		ai̯ aːi̯ au̯ aːu̯	

- Sounds /ɛ, ɔ/ may have short allophones of more close [e, o].

== Numbers ==
Tedim numbers are counted as follows.

Numeral	Tedim	English	Hindi
0	beem	zero	शून्य
1	khat	one	एक
2	nih	two	दो
3	thum	three	तीन
4	li	four	चार
5	nga	five	पाँच
6	guk	six	छह
7	sagi	seven	सात
8	giat	eight	आठ
9	kua	nine	नौ
10	sawm	ten	दस
11	sawm leh khat	eleven	ग्यारह
12	sawm leh nih	twelve	बारह
13	sawm leh thum	thirteen	तेरह
14	sawm leh li	fourteen	चौदह
15	sawm leh nga	fifteen	पंद्रह
16	sawm leh guk	sixteen	सोलह
17	sawm leh sagi	seventeen	सत्रह
18	sawm leh giat	eighteen	अठारह
19	sawm leh kua	nineteen	उन्नीस
20	sawm nih	twenty	बीस
30	sawm thum	thirty	तीस
40	sawm li	forty	चालीस
50	sawm nga	fifty	पचास
60	sawm guk	sixty	साठ
70	sawm sagi	seventy	सत्तर
80	sawm giat	eighty	अस्सी
90	sawm kua	ninety	नव्वे
100	za, za khat	hundred	सौ
1,000	tuul khat	one thousand	हज़ार
10,000	tuul sawm	ten thousand	दस हज़ार
1,000,000	awn khat	one million	दस लाख
1,000,000,000	mak za khat	one billion	एक अरब

== Sample ==
Excerpt from the Book of Genesis in Tedim language and English.

Tedim/Zopau	A kipat cilin Pasian in vantung leh leitung a piangsak hi. Leitung in lim leh meel nei loin a awngthawlpi ahi hi. Tuipi tung tengah khua mial bikbek a, tua tui tungah Pasian' huih a nung hi. Pasian in, "Khuavak om ta hen", ci hi, tua ciangin khuavak om pah hi. Pasian in khuavak hoih hi ci-in mu hi, Pasian in khuamial panin khuavak khenkhia hi. Pasian in khuavak pen Sun ci a khuamial pen Zan ci hi. Nitak hong bei-in, zingsang hong tung a, ni khat ni ahi hi. Pasian in, "Tuite' laizang-ah van kuumpi om hen la, tua van kuumpi in tui leh tui kikhensak hen", ci hi. Pasian in van kuumpi bawl a, van kuumpi tunga om tuite leh van kuumpi nuai-a om tuite a khen hi. Tua mah bangin piang pah hi. Pasian in van kuumpi pen Vantung ci hi. Nitak hong bei-in, zingsang hong tung a, ni nihna ahi hi.
English	In the beginning God created heaven and earth. The earth was formless and empty, and darkness covered the deep water. The spirit of God was hovering over the water. Then God said, "Let there be light!" So there was light. God saw the light was good. So God separated the light from the darkness. God named the light "day", and the darkness he named "night". There was evening, then morning, the first day. Then God said, "Let there be a horizon in the middle of the water in order to separate the water". So God made the horizon and separated the water above and below the horizon. And so it was. God named what was above the horizon "sky". There was evening, then morning, a second day.
