= List of populated places in Kakching district =

Villages in Kakching district of Manipur, India

The Kakching district of Manipur state in India has two subdivisions. It was created in 2016; at the time of the 2011 Census of India, it was a part of the Thoubal district.

== Subdivisions ==
The district has 2 subdivisions with 4 tehsils:

- Kakching subdivision: Kakching and Hiyanglam
- Waikhong subdivision: Waikhong and Sugnu

It has two community development blocks (CD blocks), each comprising several gram panchayats:

- Langmeidong CD Block:
  - Arong Nongmaikhong
  - Chairel
  - Hiyanglam
  - Langmeidong
  - Mayenglamjao
  - Pangantabi (PAngaltabi)
  - Sekmaijin
  - Waikhong
  - Wangoo
- Kakching CD Block
  - Kakching Khullen
  - Kakching Wairi
  - Hayel Hangoon
  - Irengband
  - Irong Chesaba
  - Keirak
  - Maibam Uchiwa
  - Pallel
  - Wabagai

== Towns ==
The district has three municipalities, of which Sugnu and Kakching Khunou were classified as Nagar Panchayats in the 2011 census, but are now administered by Municipal Councils.

Name	Type	Block	Population	Effective literacy rate	Sex ratio	SC population %	ST population %	Census code (2011)
Sugnu (Wapokpi)	Municipal Council	Waikhong	5132	77.73%	1014	0.04%	0.02%	801482
Kakching Khunou	Municipal Council	Waikhong	11379	75.87%	917	64.85%	1.91%	801483
Kakching	Municipal Council	Kakching	32138	83.08%	1046	87.57%	1.3%	801484

== Villages ==
The Kakching district has following villages:

=== Kakching subdivision ===
Name	Population	Effective literacy rate	Sex ratio	SC population %	ST population %	Census code (2011)
Kangoi	0	NA	NA	NA	NA	270003
Aimol Khullen (Aimol Khullel)	0	NA	NA	NA	NA	270001
Aimol Khunou	0	NA	NA	NA	NA	270002
Pallel	4193	79.26%	945	42.24%	5.68%	270000
Maring Phunal	0	NA	NA	NA	NA	270004
Laijing	0	NA	NA	NA	NA	269987
Irengband (including Mairembam, Hawairou and Sora)	10600	66.81%	981	0.07%	0.0%	269988
Loushipat	4	100.0%	1000	0.0%	0.0%	269989
Mantak	0	NA	NA	NA	NA	269990
Keirak	4912	74.05%	1042	0.1%	0.0%	269991
Wabagai	8578	78.95%	999	0.0%	0.01%	269992
Kharungpat	184	62.18%	1067	0.0%	0.0%	269993
Hiyanglam I (including Sekmaijin and Sekmaijin Khunou)	8872	74.46%	1023	0.0%	0.03%	269994
Khoidum (Khoidum Lamjao)	521	70.83%	867	0.38%	0.0%	269995
Hiyanglam II	2851	80.39%	1042	0.0%	0.25%	269996
Mayeng Lamjao (Mayenglamjao)	3393	80.49%	995	0.06%	0.06%	269997
Langmeidong	5935	79.73%	994	0.0%	0.07%	269999

The following villages are listed in the 2011 census directory under the Kakching block of the Thoubal district, but are not listed on the Kakching district website:

- Laimanai (population 1484), now included in Nungoo Sanamahi
- Purul Tampak (population 0)

The following villages are not listed in the 2011 census directory:

- Kakching Khullen I
- Kakching Khullen II
- Kakching Khullen III
- Kakching Wairi I
- Kakching Wairi II
- Nungoo Sanamahi (including Tejpur and Laimanai)

=== Waikhong subdivision ===
Name	Population	Effective literacy rate	Sex ratio	SC population %	ST population %	Census code (2011)
Laphupat	709	67.83%	916	0.0%	0.0%	270005
Thounaojam (including Yangdong)	1468	77.83%	1033	0.27%	0.0%	270006
Elangkhangpokpi (Elangkhanpokpi)	2815	75.41%	1047	0.0%	0.07%	270007
Thongjao (including Komnao)	2019	76.49%	1039	45.47%	0.45%	270008
Waikhong Laimanai	1804	64.29%	959	0.67%	0.28%	270010
Waikhong Ningthoumanai	1300	54.57%	892	4.38%	0.15%	270011
Mahou	0	NA	NA	NA	NA	270012
Thongam	257	64.86%	1107	0.0%	91.83%	270013
Wangoo (including Wangoo Laipham and Wangoo Sandangkhong)	6134	67.09%	982	0.0%	0.02%	270015
Chairel	3220	68.35%	1010	31.52%	0.03%	270016
Nungoo	871	73.27%	993	0.0%	0.23%	270017
Nungoo Wapokpi	2494	74.94%	1041	1.4%	0.12%	270018
Tangjeng	2427	72.0%	978	0.0%	0.04%	270019
Tonsel (Tonsen, including Korshantabi)	0	NA	NA	NA	NA	270020
Toupokpi	0	NA	NA	NA	NA	270022
Serou	4216	73.78%	973	0.0%	0.0%	270023
Arong Nongmaikhong (Arong)	5571	62.33%	1010	0.0%	0.0%	270014
Lakhi Maru (Lokhi Maru)	0	NA	NA	NA	NA	270021

The following villages are not listed in the 2011 census directory:

- Purum Khullen
- Kakching Khunou I
- Kakching Khunou II
- Pumlen Pat
