= List of populated places in Chandel district =

Villages in Chandel district of Manipur, India

The Chandel district of Manipur state in India is divided into 3 administrative sub-divisions. At the time of the 2011 Census of India, the Machi and Tengnoupal subdivisions (now part of Tengnoupal district) were part of the Chandel district, and the district had one town (Moreh) 437 villages. As of 2022, the Chandel district has no towns and 264 villages.

== Subdivisions ==
Name	Population	Effective literacy rate	Sex ratio	SC population %	ST population %	Census code (2011)
Chandel	32133	77.85%	993	0.06%	92.75%	01894
Chakpikarong	52939	71.8%	880	0.12%	92.44%	01895
Khengjoy	19164	NA	NA	NA	NA	NA

Note: The Khengjoy subdivision did not exist at the time of the 2011 census.

== Villages ==
=== Chandel subdivision ===
Name	Population	Effective literacy rate	Sex ratio	SC population %	ST population %	Census code (2011)
Kakching Mantak (Mantak)	720	91.19%	1093	0.0%	99.58%	270744
Phunansambum	506	73.19%	895	0.0%	96.44%	270745
Unapal	212	87.11%	1208	0.0%	95.28%	270746
Khuringmul	203	40.0%	971	0.0%	99.01%	270747
Khudei Khunou	504	77.61%	916	0.0%	98.02%	270748
Khuninglung	320	31.25%	1038	0.0%	98.12%	270749
Litan	219	90.81%	991	0.0%	99.54%	270750
Purum Tampak	472	95.39%	1043	0.0%	99.15%	270751
Purum Khullen	152	83.09%	1235	0.0%	100.0%	270752
Chothe Lungleh	532	81.68%	1111	0.0%	98.5%	270753
Purum Pantha	295	83.33%	1185	0.0%	100.0%	270754
Purum Lainingkhul	259	91.25%	1039	0.0%	99.61%	270755
Chothe Khunou	98	57.61%	1227	0.0%	97.96%	270756
Chandrapoto	284	65.86%	1185	0.0%	100.0%	270757
Keithelmanbi (Kaithelmanbi)	134	66.39%	1393	0.0%	100.0%	270758
Thamnapokpi (K) / P Thamnapokpi (Kuki)	159	42.11%	963	0.0%	98.74%	270759
Aihang	554	50.8%	965	0.0%	98.92%	270760
New Chayang	328	60.47%	941	0.0%	99.39%	270761
Kajiphung	127	43.44%	764	0.0%	96.06%	270762
Kalika Lok	180	56.32%	1169	0.0%	96.67%	270763
Hongbiban	226	86.01%	915	0.0%	100.0%	270764
Leingang Ching	352	56.86%	913	0.0%	99.72%	270765
Mahau Tera (Mahautera)	187	90.42%	908	0.0%	99.47%	270766
Komsen	278	84.28%	878	0.0%	1.44%	270767
Kurnoching	161	76.43%	830	0.0%	3.73%	270768
Nungkang Ching	165	82.24%	1463	0.0%	98.79%	270769
Tonsen Tampak	127	70.3%	1117	0.0%	71.65%	270770
Tonsen Khullen	373	83.54%	1084	0.0%	96.51%	270771
Beru Wangkhera	244	76.19%	952	0.0%	95.49%	270772
Julbalching (Banghring / Julbangching)	190	63.35%	1043	0.0%	100.0%	270773
Unopat	365	75.8%	807	0.0%	100.0%	270774
Tokpa Ching	127	60.36%	1228	0.0%	100.0%	270775
Khambathel	271	66.8%	1022	0.0%	100.0%	270776
Ngamkhu	64	78.57%	1000	0.0%	100.0%	270777
Nungphura	56	89.58%	1000	0.0%	100.0%	270778
Maribung	142	84.21%	797	0.0%	100.0%	270779
Beru Khudam	196	91.28%	1042	0.0%	100.0%	270780
Papaam	28	100.0%	750	0.0%	100.0%	270781
Beru Molla Bung	31	86.21%	1214	0.0%	96.77%	270782
Bolnidam	85	65.43%	574	0.0%	96.47%	270783
Beru Anthi	108	36.89%	964	0.0%	99.07%	270784
Modi	155	78.2%	962	0.0%	100.0%	270785
Lamphou Pasana	610	86.13%	1047	0.0%	99.67%	270786
Chandel Christian	1521	95.0%	251	0.0%	35.37%	270787
Chandel Khulbul	57	84.91%	1375	0.0%	100.0%	270788
Chandel Khullen	144	81.1%	973	0.0%	100.0%	270789
Hanatham (Hnatham)	884	67.48%	1023	0.11%	99.43%	270790
Kurkam	88	85.33%	1256	0.0%	98.86%	270791
Abungkhu / Abungnikhu	482	84.82%	1051	0.0%	99.17%	270792
Charang Ching Khunou	236	86.7%	873	0.0%	99.15%	270793
Chrang Ching Khullen (Charang Ching Khullen)	317	88.71%	1032	0.0%	99.68%	270794
Angkhel Chayang	262	53.95%	941	0.0%	100.0%	270795
P. Ralringkhu	294	88.14%	1100	0.0%	99.32%	270796
Liwa Sarei	337	78.55%	1160	0.0%	99.7%	270797
Liwa Maring	164	55.12%	1025	0.0%	100.0%	270798
Liwa Khullen	382	69.03%	1099	0.0%	99.74%	270799
Heibunglok	840	84.17%	1029	0.0%	99.64%	270800
Zointlang	206	85.23%	1060	0.0%	100.0%	270801
New Wangparal	180	81.01%	1169	1.11%	88.89%	270802
Old Wangparal	252	96.23%	1083	0.0%	98.02%	270803
Liwa Changning	394	96.79%	1041	0.0%	90.61%	270804
Komlathabi	945	94.36%	1182	0.21%	95.34%	270805
Pena Ching	322	68.63%	1556	0.31%	98.45%	270806
Purum Chumbang	365	72.87%	1062	0.0%	93.42%	270807
Leipung Tampak	593	86.7%	1052	0.0%	100.0%	270808
Leishokching	214	86.46%	1119	0.0%	100.0%	270809
Thamnapokpi / Thamnapokpi (Lamkang)	417	72.48%	1095	0.0%	96.88%	270810
Thamlakhuren	378	90.57%	1000	0.0%	99.74%	270811
Chingkhir	140	59.56%	728	0.0%	95.71%	270812
Lamkang Khunou	468	84.07%	1026	0.0%	94.44%	270813
Lamkang Khunkha	411	90.28%	1086	0.0%	95.38%	270814
Kongpe (Kongpa)	170	66.91%	1125	0.0%	97.65%	270815
Tarao Laimanai	181	65.13%	885	0.0%	100.0%	270816
Lamkang Khunthak (New L Khunthak)	259	72.69%	2120	0.0%	98.84%	270817
Mittong (Mitong)	228	58.92%	1000	0.0%	99.56%	270818
Monsang Pantha	568	61.59%	1000	0.0%	94.89%	270819
Mantri Pantha	349	46.39%	1237	0.0%	97.71%	270820
Zaphou (Japhou)	2179	82.21%	1132	0.23%	97.25%	270821
L. Thankam (L Thangkham)	223	60.58%	991	0.0%	99.1%	270822
Thangbung Minou (T. Minou)	160	79.71%	975	0.0%	100.0%	270823
Maha Centre Bazar (West)	707	72.8%	1155	0.0%	54.46%	270824
Maha Centre Bazar (East)	166	79.56%	1371	0.0%	68.67%	270825
Panchai	504	82.56%	1074	1.19%	98.61%	270826
Lambung (Phunchung)	1021	81.92%	1088	0.0%	99.12%	270827
Lamphou Charu (Lamphou Chru)	219	71.21%	1066	0.0%	100.0%	270828
Anal Khullen	302	86.1%	987	0.0%	99.67%	270829
Oklu	235	90.15%	1026	0.0%	100.0%	270830
Phiran Leihao (Phiran Leihou)	73	14.06%	1028	0.0%	100.0%	270831
Phairan Khullen	212	12.37%	910	0.0%	99.53%	270832
Khongjon (Khongyan)	484	95.6%	883	0.21%	93.18%	270833
Larong Khullen	587	81.47%	990	0.0%	99.49%	270834
Darku (Vomku or Vumku)	126	53.64%	1172	0.0%	100.0%	270835
Challong	259	78.92%	933	0.0%	99.23%	270836
Duthang	218	88.21%	1076	0.0%	99.54%	270837
Paraolen (Paraolon)	310	85.06%	1153	0.0%	100.0%	270838
Libung	113	67.03%	1132	0.0%	100.0%	270839
Thingbongphai	62	75.0%	1067	0.0%	96.77%	270840
Darchin	126	56.31%	1100	0.0%	98.41%	270841

The following villages listed on the district website (2022) are not listed in the 2011 census directory: Betuk, Chengkhu, Kapaam, and Mangkang.

=== Chakpikarong subdivision ===
Name	Population	Effective literacy rate	Sex ratio	SC population %	ST population %	Census code (2011)
Langching	548	90.7%	1037	0.18%	98.91%	270842
Lhongchin (Lhochin)	49	75.0%	1042	0.0%	97.96%	270843
Sugnu Zouveng	435	59.94%	1081	0.0%	100.0%	270844
Sugnu Tribal	734	81.9%	1103	0.0%	99.73%	270845
Sugnu Lokhijang	612	59.96%	1250	0.0%	99.84%	270846
Sugnu Lamhang	608	98.35%	1097	0.0%	99.84%	270847
D. Bethany	85	94.67%	1024	0.0%	94.12%	270848
Sahumphei (Sahumphai)	283	54.36%	1177	0.0%	97.88%	270849
Singtom	314	60.07%	1079	0.0%	99.68%	270850
Sokom	789	52.62%	982	0.0%	99.87%	270851
M. Munpi	267	78.54%	1023	0.0%	100.0%	270852
Bolchang Tampak (Boljang Tampak)	216	80.71%	982	0.0%	100.0%	270853
Phainom	29	79.31%	526	0.0%	86.21%	270854
Uchatampak	262	88.57%	1047	0.0%	100.0%	270855
Lonpi Khonou (Lonpi Khunou)	134	67.83%	942	0.0%	100.0%	270856
Saronphai (T. Saronphai)	42	85.71%	1000	0.0%	100.0%	270857
Tuisamphai	26	84.62%	857	0.0%	88.46%	270858
Gangpijang	67	74.07%	1030	0.0%	100.0%	270859
Khongnang Pheisabi (Khongnangpheisabi)	211	81.5%	936	0.0%	100.0%	270860
Utangpokpi	351	83.6%	1053	0.0%	99.15%	270861
Kotsophai	330	61.9%	864	0.0%	99.39%	270862
M. Zozamveng (M. Zojam Veng)	51	66.67%	962	0.0%	98.04%	270863
M. Molnoi	82	66.13%	1158	0.0%	100.0%	270864
Thungcheng (Tungcheng)	312	76.47%	1261	0.0%	99.68%	270865
Toupokpi	670	90.54%	1248	0.0%	99.4%	270866
Nungpan	612	89.57%	1007	0.0%	99.18%	270867
Dengkhu (Dangkhu)	252	63.16%	1000	0.0%	95.24%	270868
V. Haipijang	281	77.49%	1113	0.0%	85.05%	270869
Y. Thingkangphai	282	82.77%	1029	0.0%	98.58%	270870
Chakpimolbem	283	65.52%	1007	0.0%	80.92%	270871
Selkui	207	57.29%	971	0.0%	97.1%	270872
L. Thingkangphai (L. Thinglhangphai)	262	80.09%	1220	0.0%	99.62%	270873
K. Molnom	357	77.7%	983	0.0%	98.32%	270874
K.Phailen	151	25.66%	1068	0.0%	99.34%	270875
U. Thingkangphai (U. Thinngkanphai)	223	63.64%	939	0.0%	99.55%	270876
S. Thingkangphai	189	75.95%	929	0.0%	100.0%	270877
Teijang (Teiyang)	457	78.79%	978	0.0%	99.34%	270878
Phaijang	198	87.06%	833	0.0%	100.0%	270879
Tampi	951	87.1%	1132	0.0%	98.95%	270880
L. Chengvol (L. Chengbol)	69	62.3%	816	0.0%	98.55%	270881
Charoiching	526	97.16%	1071	0.0%	100.0%	270882
Anal Khunou	260	96.9%	1063	0.0%	100.0%	270883
Peace Island	165	60.4%	964	0.0%	100.0%	270884
Y. Kutha (Y. Khutha)	463	93.72%	1134	0.0%	99.57%	270885
Chakpikarong	1569	94.44%	1129	0.0%	97.77%	270886
Khusi Tampak	109	60.82%	982	0.0%	98.17%	270887
Khopijang	99	90.24%	941	0.0%	100.0%	270888
Limkhurim (Limkhuhrin)	107	48.45%	1098	0.0%	100.0%	270889
Sothum (Shuthum)	64	89.29%	778	0.0%	96.88%	270890
Hringphe	482	93.98%	951	0.0%	97.3%	270891
Hnarelal (Hnaleral)	91	56.1%	1333	0.0%	100.0%	270892
Beaula	190	27.75%	881	0.0%	96.32%	270893
Rungchang	585	75.14%	1183	0.0%	99.83%	270894
Pamtujang	28	78.57%	1154	0.0%	100.0%	270895
Akaphe	153	90.3%	1125	0.0%	98.69%	270896
Shalluk (Salluk)	539	89.87%	982	0.0%	99.44%	270897
P. Khudam	289	79.42%	1189	0.0%	100.0%	270898
Ravalon (Rabalon)	142	62.73%	972	0.0%	100.0%	270899
Sarangtampak (Sarang Tampak)	189	53.21%	929	0.0%	100.0%	270900
Tuinou	193	76.97%	1193	0.0%	96.89%	270901
Hringkhu A.	53	81.4%	963	0.0%	100.0%	270902
Ch.K. Hringkhu (Hringkhu B)	79	86.76%	927	0.0%	100.0%	270903
P. Thumpajol (P. Thumphajol)	153	87.76%	843	0.0%	86.93%	270904
T. Bethel	235	82.14%	1098	0.0%	100.0%	270905
L. Molhoi	259	74.39%	1039	0.0%	96.53%	270906
Kanan	148	89.63%	850	0.0%	100.0%	270907
K. Kangbung (Kangbung)	127	90.0%	1082	0.0%	87.4%	270908
Kanakangbung (Kana Kangbung)	738	94.51%	1022	0.0%	98.37%	270909
Gelngai	236	78.39%	967	0.0%	98.31%	270910
Longja	570	56.26%	1192	0.0%	98.77%	270911
Songkong	196	90.79%	593	0.0%	84.69%	270912
Lhalpi	88	93.75%	1095	0.0%	93.18%	270913
Mongjang	240	78.71%	818	0.0%	97.5%	270914
Gunjil	113	90.43%	948	0.0%	99.12%	270915
T. Phaicham	157	77.14%	1039	0.0%	100.0%	270916
T. Sijang	212	84.62%	927	0.0%	94.34%	270917
Chahkap	422	42.62%	1010	0.0%	99.76%	270918
Paldai	575	85.6%	879	0.0%	97.91%	270919
Haika (L) / (Haikha (L)	738	78.97%	979	0.0%	98.51%	270920
Sajik Tampak	1562	89.36%	334	0.0%	50.26%	270921
S. Molnom	311	75.39%	896	0.0%	98.71%	270922
Khumunnom	198	69.18%	904	0.0%	99.49%	270923
Khullenkhallet (Khullen Khailet)	888	57.5%	930	0.0%	98.65%	270924
Molphei	414	60.92%	908	0.0%	98.31%	270925
Phoikon	183	58.93%	906	0.0%	98.36%	270926
K.Bethel	122	40.21%	1103	0.0%	98.36%	270927
Y. Phaisi	259	88.3%	1008	0.0%	99.61%	270928
Kholmunlen	210	74.62%	780	0.0%	100.0%	270929
Jangdung	157	43.55%	826	0.0%	100.0%	270930
Khongtal	102	50.0%	855	0.0%	100.0%	270931
Mollen	218	81.6%	802	0.0%	99.54%	270932
Haika / Haika (H)	466	58.08%	857	0.0%	98.5%	270933
M. Tolpijang	48	14.63%	1182	0.0%	93.75%	270934
S. Sijang	237	71.82%	1008	0.0%	99.16%	270935
Aisi (Aishi)	174	51.08%	977	0.0%	100.0%	270936
Aigejang (Aigijang)	267	24.36%	935	0.0%	97.38%	270937
Bollok	141	84.43%	1390	0.0%	97.87%	270938
N. Angbuwng (N. Angbung)	97	52.44%	1109	0.0%	93.81%	270939
Kanaralveng (Kanaralven)	88	46.91%	1316	0.0%	95.45%	270940
Khubung Khunou	988	82.09%	984	0.0%	98.99%	270941
Thorcham	482	84.78%	1017	0.0%	99.17%	270943
Royal Chakpi Bazar	72	81.43%	1483	0.0%	98.61%	270944
Khubung Khullen	439	83.6%	1111	0.0%	97.27%	270946
Phiranmachet	630	88.89%	1059	0.0%	98.25%	270947
Khumbungphe	192	63.59%	979	0.0%	100.0%	270948
Lonkhu	64	51.61%	600	0.0%	100.0%	270949
HL. Bemung	0	NA	NA	NA	NA	271011
Sangni (Shangni)	357	77.26%	1028	0.0%	98.88%	271012

The following villages listed on the district website (2022) are not listed in the 2011 census directory: Bolchang and Kankhu.

=== Khengjoy subdivision ===
Name	Population	Effective literacy rate	Sex ratio	SC population %	ST population %	Census code (2011)
Gamphajol	167	70.5%	1114	0.0%	100.0%	270961
Kotal Khunthak	147	71.2%	1262	0.0%	100.0%	270950
Aibol Jamkhomang	242	41.41%	891	0.0%	100.0%	270994
Aibol Joupi	157	29.36%	826	0.0%	98.73%	270990
Bongmol Tampak	143	57.02%	907	0.0%	98.6%	271007
Cheljang Joupi	171	31.01%	693	0.0%	99.42%	270991
Joumol	96	80.65%	811	0.0%	94.79%	270992
Molngat	235	52.15%	958	0.0%	96.17%	270993
Sehlon	727	88.84%	212	5.78%	37.14%	270995
Phoilen	225	4.39%	1045	0.0%	97.78%	270996
New Wayang (Changjal)	155	56.29%	938	0.0%	96.77%	270997
Wayang	122	21.24%	937	0.0%	100.0%	270998
Toitung	649	74.1%	703	0.0%	83.98%	270999
Hengshi	303	53.14%	894	0.0%	99.67%	270987
Hollenjang	369	47.56%	800	0.0%	99.46%	270988
J. Lhangnom	127	82.05%	924	0.0%	97.64%	271005
Molcham	815	72.64%	904	0.0%	98.53%	271006
Khengjang	538	42.23%	901	0.0%	96.1%	271008
Sejang Theose (Sejang Tgeose)	176	60.43%	956	0.0%	98.3%	271009
K. Selhai	142	67.26%	945	0.0%	98.59%	271010
Joupi	1261	93.63%	111	0.0%	24.19%	270982
Nakong	58	81.13%	933	0.0%	100.0%	270983
Mombi (Monbi)	464	75.46%	1090	0.0%	99.14%	270984
S. Lhangnom	175	81.29%	862	0.0%	98.86%	270985
K. Savumpa	424	25.87%	1174	0.0%	99.06%	270955
Molpibung	176	45.31%	1173	0.0%	98.86%	270956
S. Lamphei	205	62.86%	952	0.0%	100.0%	270957
Tuidam (Tudam)	111	29.47%	1220	0.0%	100.0%	270958
Thingphai	357	83.27%	1076	0.0%	99.44%	270959
T.S. Laijang (TS Laojang)	319	52.4%	910	0.0%	98.43%	270960
Nabin (Nabil)	124	55.0%	968	0.0%	100.0%	270963
Old Changpol	180	28.76%	1069	0.0%	98.33%	270965
T. Monglen	162	67.83%	862	0.0%	99.38%	270966
T. Nampao	407	34.2%	966	0.0%	98.77%	270967
Khangtung	201	43.12%	951	0.0%	99.5%	270968
Khumkot	136	45.3%	1092	0.0%	99.26%	270969
Yangoulen (Yangngoulen)	451	76.54%	936	0.0%	98.89%	270970
Khangbarol	430	50.12%	1000	0.0%	99.3%	270979
Saibol Joupi	237	71.23%	1116	0.0%	98.73%	270980
T. Bollon	141	67.23%	855	0.0%	97.16%	270981
Khengjoy	619	48.92%	1030	0.0%	98.55%	270973
Moldennom	123	26.73%	1196	0.0%	99.19%	270974
Songdop	101	8.6%	942	0.0%	100.0%	270975
Semol	105	37.35%	981	0.0%	100.0%	270976
Sehao	327	59.04%	1019	0.0%	99.39%	270977
L.H.Jangnomphai	121	27.78%	862	0.0%	97.52%	271003
Molkon (Molkan)	155	51.85%	867	0.0%	100.0%	270972
N. Gamnom	230	71.05%	949	0.0%	98.7%	271000
New Somtal	1737	61.39%	802	0.0%	89.75%	271004
Songjang	268	61.16%	914	0.0%	98.13%	270952
New Songjang	225	86.89%	940	0.0%	99.11%	270953
P. Chehjang	640	65.52%	808	0.0%	97.97%	270954
Tolbung (Olbung)	612	65.5%	877	0.0%	98.04%	270986
Tuikong	91	36.36%	936	0.0%	97.8%	270945
Tuyang (Tuijang)	225	70.81%	829	0.0%	96.44%	270989
L. Bongjoi (Bongjoy)	197	58.23%	1118	0.0%	99.49%	270971
Gohok (Gobok)	229	42.86%	957	0.0%	100.0%	270942
Moltuh (Moltuk)	1021	80.66%	159	0.0%	26.44%	270951
Kovang (Kowang)	52	17.07%	1737	0.0%	100.0%	271001
Laijang (Lajang or Layang)	214	10.14%	981	0.0%	99.53%	271002
Changpol	566	97.85%	690	3.36%	85.16%	270962
Chaljang	0	NA	NA	NA	NA	270978
Ch Bileijang	127	65.74%	924	0.0%	98.43%	270964
