= Kakching (disambiguation) =

Kakching may also refer to:

- of or relating to Kakching
- Kakching dialect of Meitei language
- Kakching Khunou, an eponymous village, near Kakching
- Kakching district, an eponymous district which is headquartered in Kakching
- Kakching Assembly constituency, one of the assembly constituencies of Manipur
- Kakching Bora, a traditional snacks of Meitei cuisine
