= Mombi, Manipur =

Mombi Lonpi
- Interactive map of Mombi
- Location in Manipur, India Mombi (India)
- Coordinates: 24.1320°N 93.9152°E
- Country: India
- State: Manipur
- District: Chandel
- Subdivision: Chakpikarong

Population (2011)
  - Total: 464

Language(s)
  - Official: Meitei (Manipuri)
  - Regional: Kuki-Chin languages
- Time zone: UTC+5:30 (IST)

Mombi, (Note: Alternative spellings: Monbi, and Mombee. Scholar Pum Khan Pau notes that the original name of the village in Kuki-Chin languages is "Mualpi", which is also the name of another village in Myanmar's Chin Hills.) also called Lawmpi or Lonpi, is a census village in the Chandel district in Manipur, India. It has a population of 464 in the 2011 census.

Mombi is a village of historical significance. The burning of the village by the British Raj on 17 October 1917 launched the Anglo-Kuki War that lasted two years.

== Geography ==
The Gazetteer of Manipur (1886) mentions the village Mombi as being situated on a head-stream of the Chakpi River, whose name is Tuiyang (or Tuingam). The Survey of India map, however, places the village on the ridge adjascent to the Tuiyang river valley. The ridge currently houses the State Highway from Sugnu to the Myanmar border near Yangoulen and Khengjang villages (with a village called Tuivang being on the opposite side of the border in Myanmar).

The entire ridge appears to constitute the "Lonpi/Mombi village". At the northwestern end of the ridge, which dips into the valley of Chakpi River is a "New Mombi" village, adjacent to Kuljang. At the southeastern end of the ridge is a peak designated as "Lonpi Gamvet Mol", by the Government of Manipur, a scenic attraction.

== History ==
According to the Gazetteer of Manipur, the village of Mombi was settled by the Mangvung clan of Thadou Kukis (who were known as "Khongjais" in Manipur). The Thadou were probably displaced from Mualpi in Chin Hills, and apparently reused that name (spelt "Mombi" by Manipuris) for their new village.

During the rule of Nara Singh (r. 1834–1850), the Kamhau-Sukte tribes apparently took possession of Mualpi and made several raids on southeastern Manipuri villages, including Mombi and Heeroway. In 1855, after Maharaja Chandrakirti Singh came to power, they burnt down the Namphou/Lamphou village, (Note: Alternative spellings: "Namfow", "Numfow".) which is further north close to Chandel. In 1857, the Maharaja led a 1,500-strong force against Kam Hau at Tedim, the chief of the tribes. But the effort failed, with the Manipuri commander getting killed and the troops dispersing "in confusion". The Maharaja was forced to agree to a border with Kam Hau along the Chakpi River. Thus Mombi remained in the hands of the Kamhau-Sukte tribes. The Maharaja established a border post at Namphou to the north of Mombi.

In 1872, the Maharaja sent an expedition to the Chivu salt springs (near modern Behiang on the present day southern border of Manipur), ostensibly to support the British Lushai Expedition. The Manipuri troops camped near Chivu for two months and, while returning, arrested the Kamhau chief of Mualpi who happened to pass through the area. Even though the British officials decried the arrest as "treachery", the Maharaja succeeded in marking his desired territorial boundary near Chivu.

After these events, the southern tribes continued to be either independent or paid tributes to the Kamhau-Suktes. From Mombi, the Kamhaus appear to have controlled the hills up to the Khuga River valley. The British administration reports describe a clash between Manipur's khongjai troops and the Kamhaus in 1876, where victory is claimed for the Manipur troops.

In 1894, The British delineated the border between Manipur and the "Chin Hills" region, which was to be awarded Burma. They ran the border close to the previously marked "Pemberton's line" and continued it to Chivu springs. According to scholar Pum Khan Pau, 47 tribal villages that paid tribute to the Kamhau chief were thus transferred to Manipur, Mombi included.

== See also ==
- List of populated places in Chandel district

== Bibliography ==
- Annual Administration Report of the Munnipoor Agency, For the year ending 30th June 1874–75, Selections from the Records of the Government of India, Foreign Department, Calcutta: Foreign Department Press, 1876 – via archive.org
- Annual Administration Report of the Munnipoor Agency, For the year ending 30th June 1875–76, Selections from the Records of the Government of India, Foreign Department, Calcutta: Foreign Department Press, 1876 – via archive.org
- Chandel District Census Handbook (PDF), Directorate of Census Operations, Manipur, 2011
- Dun, E. W. (1992) [1886], Gazetteer of Manipur, Manas Publications – via archive.org
- Jangkhomang Guite; Thongkholal Haokip, eds. (2019), The Anglo-Kuki War, 1917–1919: A Frontier Uprising against Imperialism during World War I, Routledge, ISBN 978-1-138-50704-3
  - Guite, Jangkhomang (2019), "'Fighting the White Men till the Last Bullet': The general course of the Anglo-Kuki War", Ibid, pp. 37–
  - Haokip, D. Letkhojam (2019), "'These Crafty Jungle Fighters': Tactics, technology and symbols of Kuki war", Ibid, pp. 118–
- Ngamjahao Kipgen; Doungul Letkhojam Haokip, eds. (2021), Against the Empire: Polity, Economy and Culture during the Anglo-Kuki War, 1917–1919, Routledge, ISBN 978-1-003-00065-5
  - Hanneng, David (2021), "From Co-operation to Coercion: The Anglo-Kuki War as a response to changing British geopolitics", Ibid, pp. 53–70
  - Lunkhopao, Robert (2021), "Empire of Violence: Colonial state-making and frontier violence during the Anglo-Kuki War", Ibid, pp. 71–90
- Pau, Pum Khan (2019), Indo-Burma Frontier and the Making of the Chin Hills: Empire and Resistance, Taylor & Francis, ISBN 9781000507454
