= Anāl Naga =

Anāl Naga may refer to:

- Anāl people
- Anāl language
