= Khongyam =

- Village
- Khongyam Location in Manipur, India
- Country: India
- State: Manipur
- District: Kakching

Khongyam is a small village situated within the Kakching district in the Indian state of Manipur. It is located about 66 Km to the south of Imphal.

== See also ==
- Sugnu
- Chajing Khunou
- Wangoo
