= Chajing Khunou =

Chajing khunou
- Village
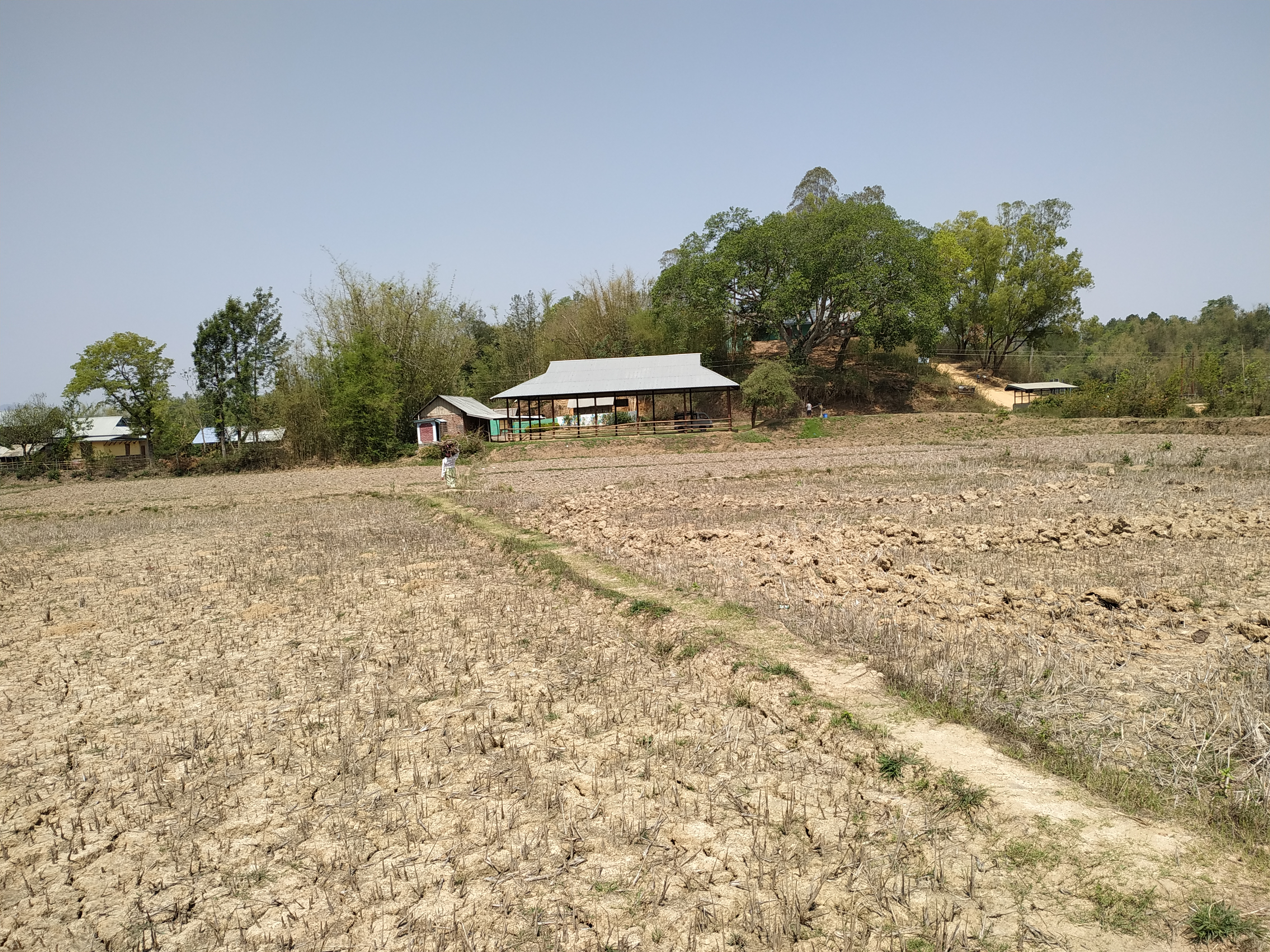
- Chajing khunou Community hall

- Chajing Khunou Location in Manipur, India
- Coordinates: 24.3233°N 93.8836°E
- Country: India
- State: Manipur
- District: Kakching

Population
  - Total: 300

Chajing Khunou (Meitei: ꯆꯥꯖꯤꯡ ꯈꯨꯅꯧ) is a small village situated within the Kakching district in the Indian state of Manipur. It is located about 75 km (47 mi) to the south of Imphal. The village covers an area of approximately 0.75 km^{2} (0.29 sq mi) and contains 60 households with a population in 2018 of 270 people. The village originates from an old town, Lilong Chajing, which is about 65 km (40 mi) to the north of Chajing Khunou. It was first settled in the 1960s, by migrants from Lilong Chajing.

== Sports ==
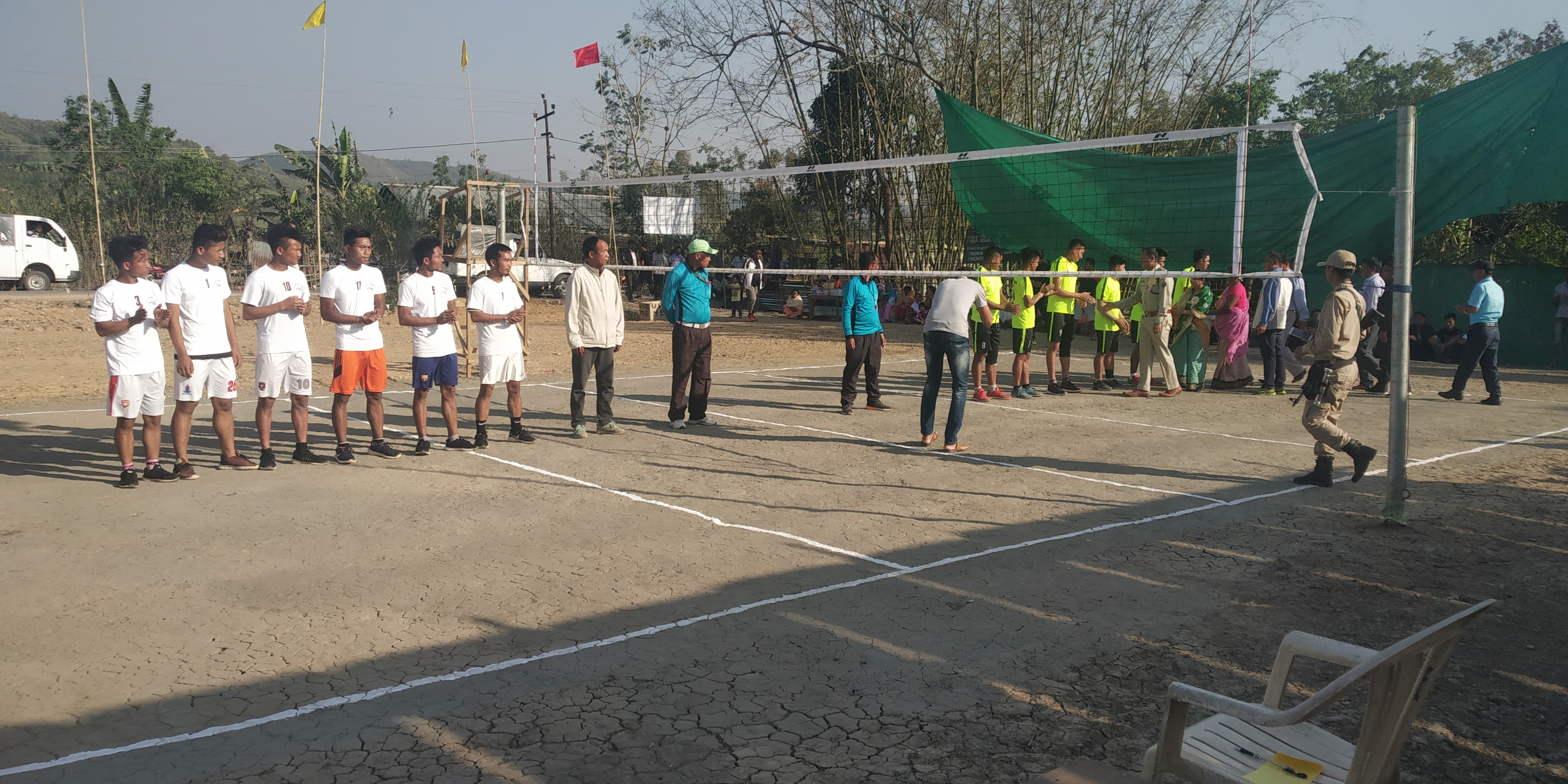
1st State Level Men's Volleyball in Chajing khunou

This village "Chajing khunou" have been significant place for Volleyball in state Manipur since 1980. The Chajing Khunou Welfare Club organized the First State Level Men's Volleyball under the aegis of All Manipur Volleyball Association starting 24 March and ends 28 March in 2019.

== Religion ==
Religion in Chajing Khunou (2011)
1. Sanamahism (99.9%)
2. other (0.10%)

Most people of this village follow the Sanamahi religion.

It has a sacred place, Ebhudhou Santhong Apanba, which is situated at a small hill, known as Chajing Khunou Laibung, to the north of the village and the neighbouring village of Korsantabi. The people of the village take part in Lai Haraoba (a festival of worshipping or offering to God in community level in group) in the summer i.e. Kalen in Meitei Thapalon (calendar) which falls in May–June every year at Ebhudhou Santhong Apanba.

== Food habits ==
Most people's of this village are non-vegetarian as most of people are Sanamahism religion.

== See also ==
- Khongyam
- Sugnu
- Wangoo
