= Hiyanglam =

- Village
- Location in Manipur, India Hiyanglam (India)
- Coordinates (24.5189° N, 93.9253° E): 24.51°N 93.92°E
- Country: India
- State: Manipur
- District: Kakching district

Hiyanglam is a village situated within Kakching district, Manipur, India. It has a population of about 8,872 people in 2011.

== Demographics ==
Hiyanglam is neighbors with Wabagai in west, Langmeidong in South.
