= Mayanglambam Rameshwar Singh =

Indian politician

Member of the Manipur Legislative Assembly

Mayanglambam Rameshwar Singh (born 1969) is an Indian politician from Manipur. He is a four-time member of the Manipur Legislative Assembly from Kakching Assembly constituency in Thoubal district. He won the 2022 Manipur Legislative Assembly election, representing the National People's Party.

== Early life and education ==
Singh is from Kakching, Thoubal district, Manipur. He is the son of late Mayanglambam Aber Singh. He completed his M. A. In political science in 2002 at University of Delhi. Earlier, he did Bachelor of Law in 2020 at Manipur University.

== Career ==
Singh won from Kakching Assembly constituency as the National People's Party candidate in the 2022 Manipur Legislative Assembly election. He polled 8,546 votes and defeated his nearest rival, Yengkhom Surchandra Singh of the Bharatiya Janata Party, by 1,205 votes.
