= Paldai =

Village in Manipur, India

Coordinates: 24.114°N 93.822°E

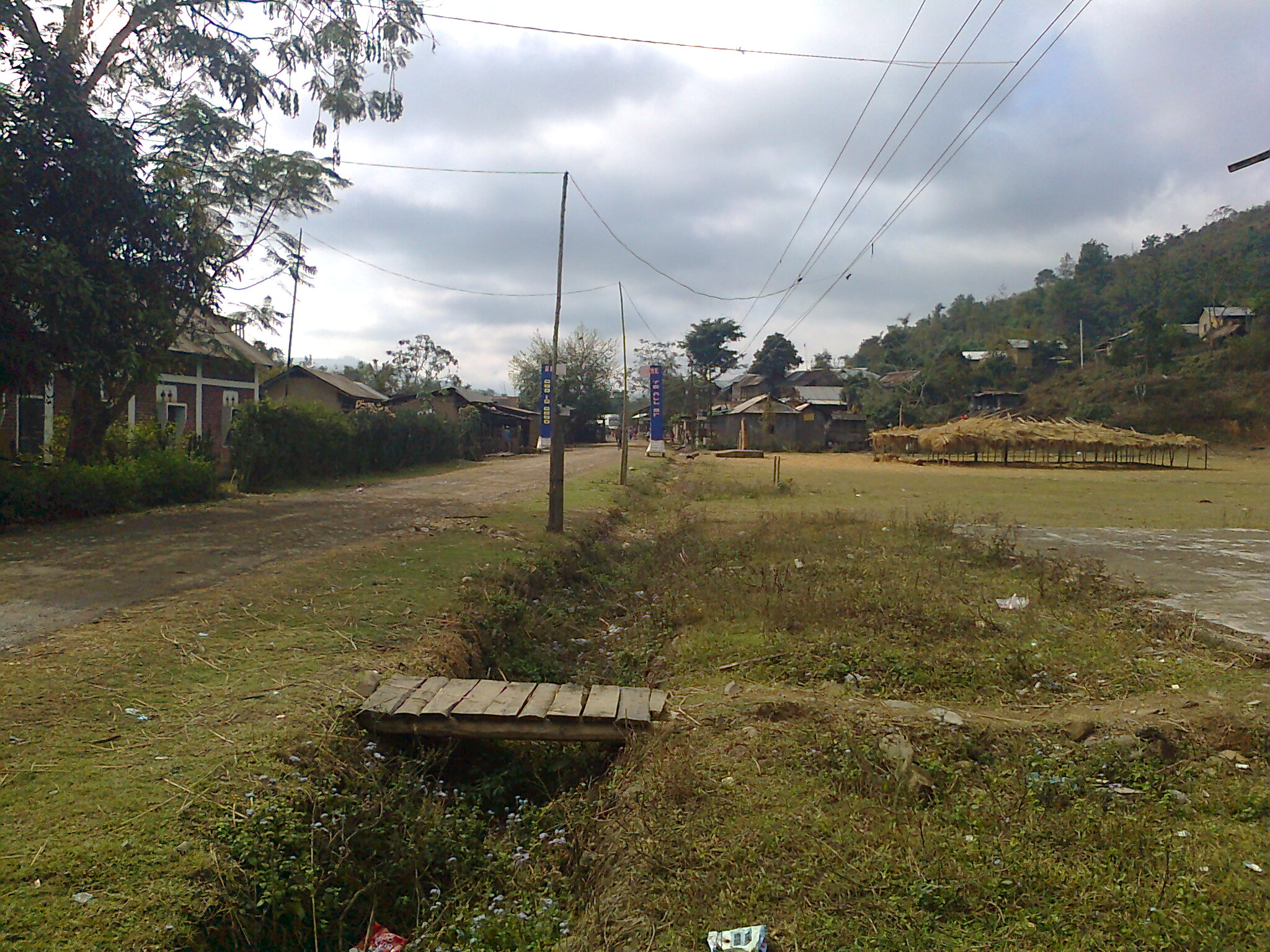
Lower zone

Paldai is a village in the Manipur state of India. One of the oldest villages along the western region of Kana river, it is located in the Chakpikarong Sub-Division of the Chandel District. Originally, the geographical boundaries were once at the mouth of Kana river in the north and "Suonnoupa Muol" in the south, and the hill ranges extending between these two in the west.

It was pioneered and founded by Shri Pu Helchin Taithul. He was succeeded by his eldest son (L)ET Thangpu Taithul. It was the village in India in that region, established a century before India achieved its independence. It is about 90–100 km from Imphal. The village recognition number is 270919. RELIGION: The inhabitants of Paldai village embraced Christianity since 1920. They have been following the policy of 'one village one religious organization' since the time Christianity set foot there. There is only church-building for the whole villagers. This signifies the religious unity among the villagers. They have also built a prayer-cabin on the hill named "Muoltung Kaina", situated to its western region. It is sponsored and donated by a famous prayer warrior Rev. Kamkhozam. People use this cabin as a place of prayer.

EDUCATION There is a Government primary School in Paldai. There is also a religious mission school run by the religious Department.

FESTIVAL The villagers used to celebrate various festivals such as Christmas, New year festival, Good Friday, Khodou pawi, etc.

GAMES AND SPORTS The villagers of Paldai loves to play various indoor games such as carrom, chess, ludo, etc. and outdoor games such as football, villeyball, kabaddi, etc. They have only one playground called 'HM GROUND", which is named after the founder of this village, Pu Helchin Taithul.

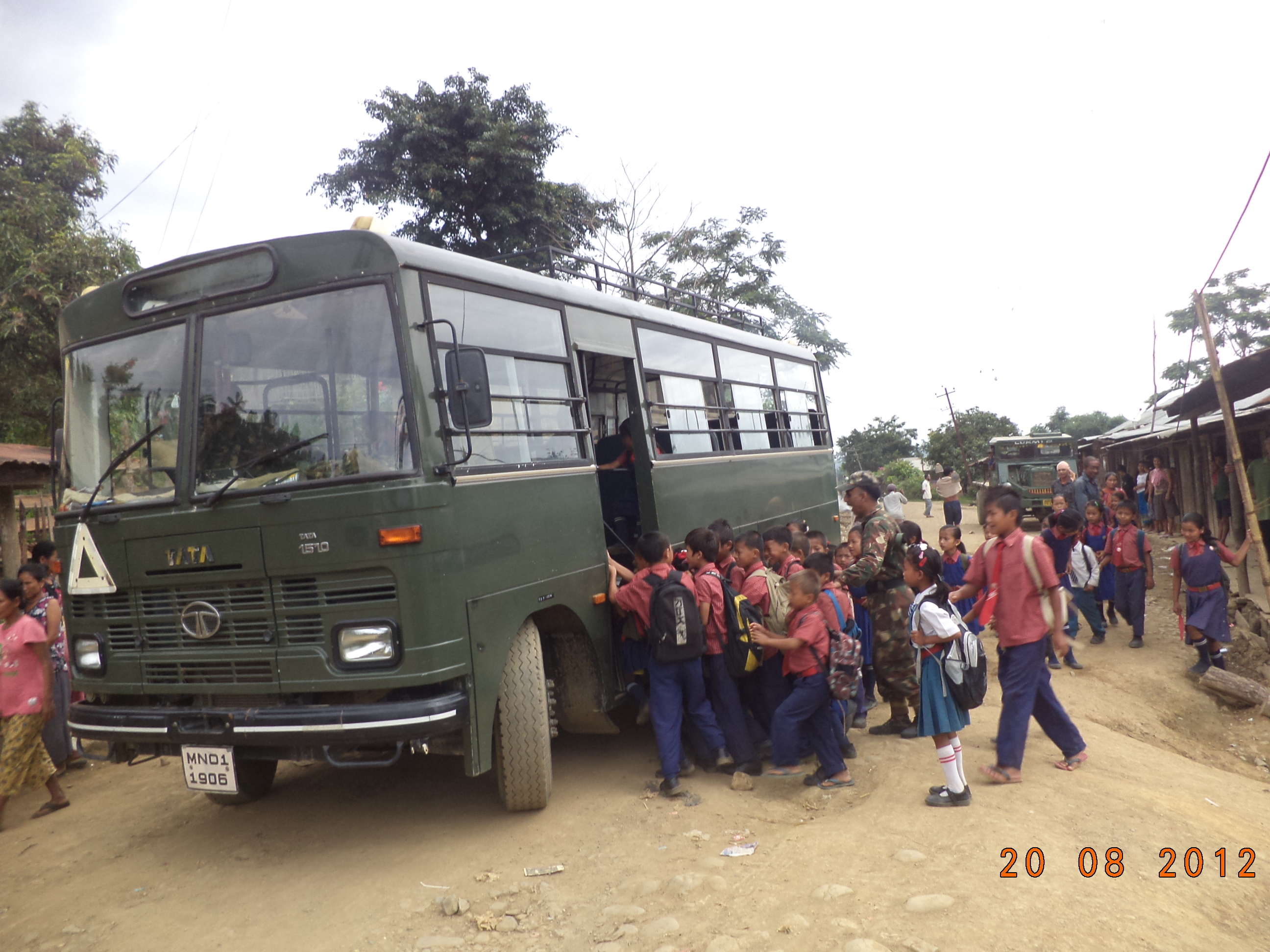
School bus provided by Assam Rifles

== Transportation ==
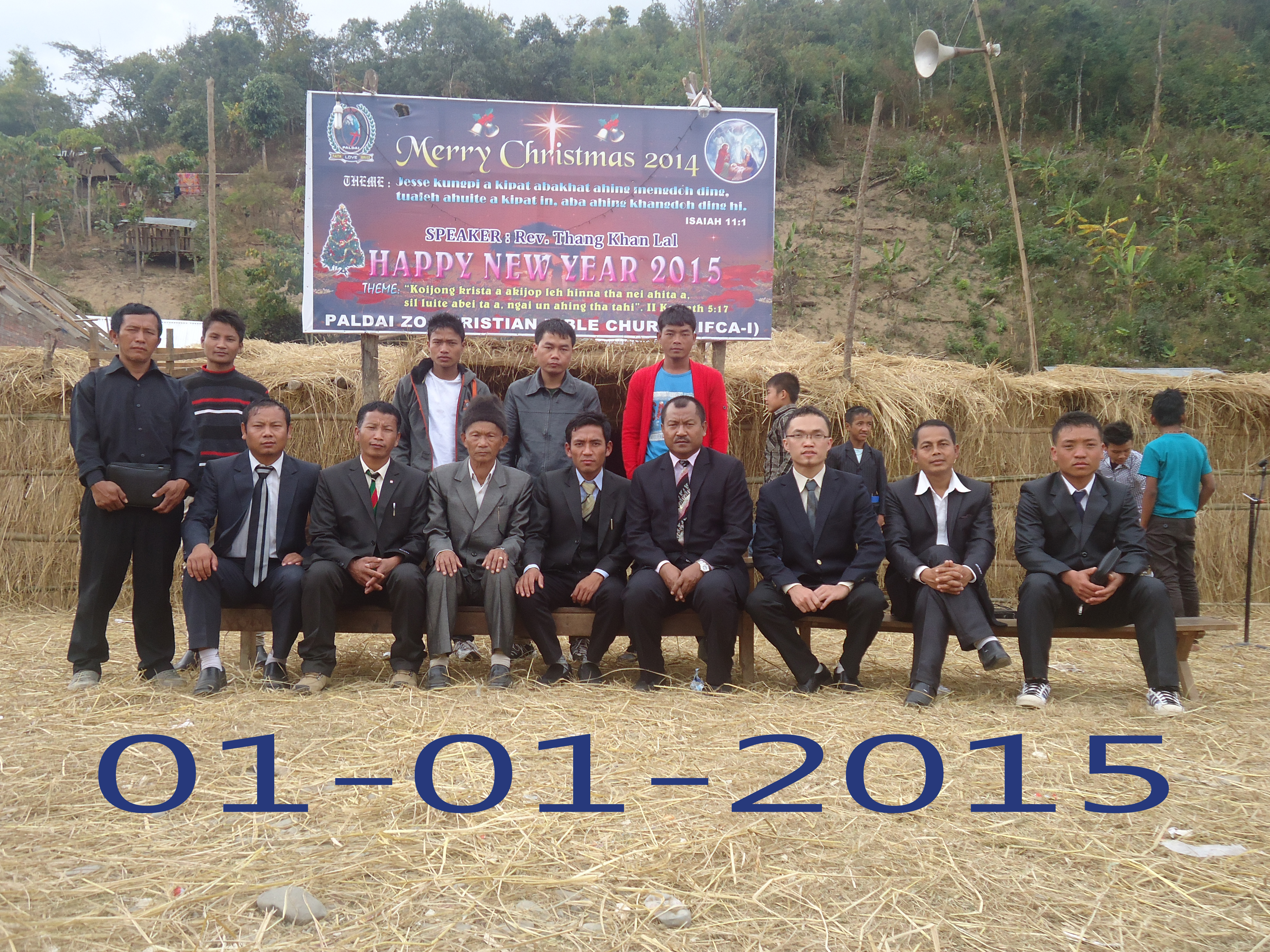
Kumtha Ni

The village can be accessed through the National Highway No. 59, or the Indo-Burma road from Imphal via

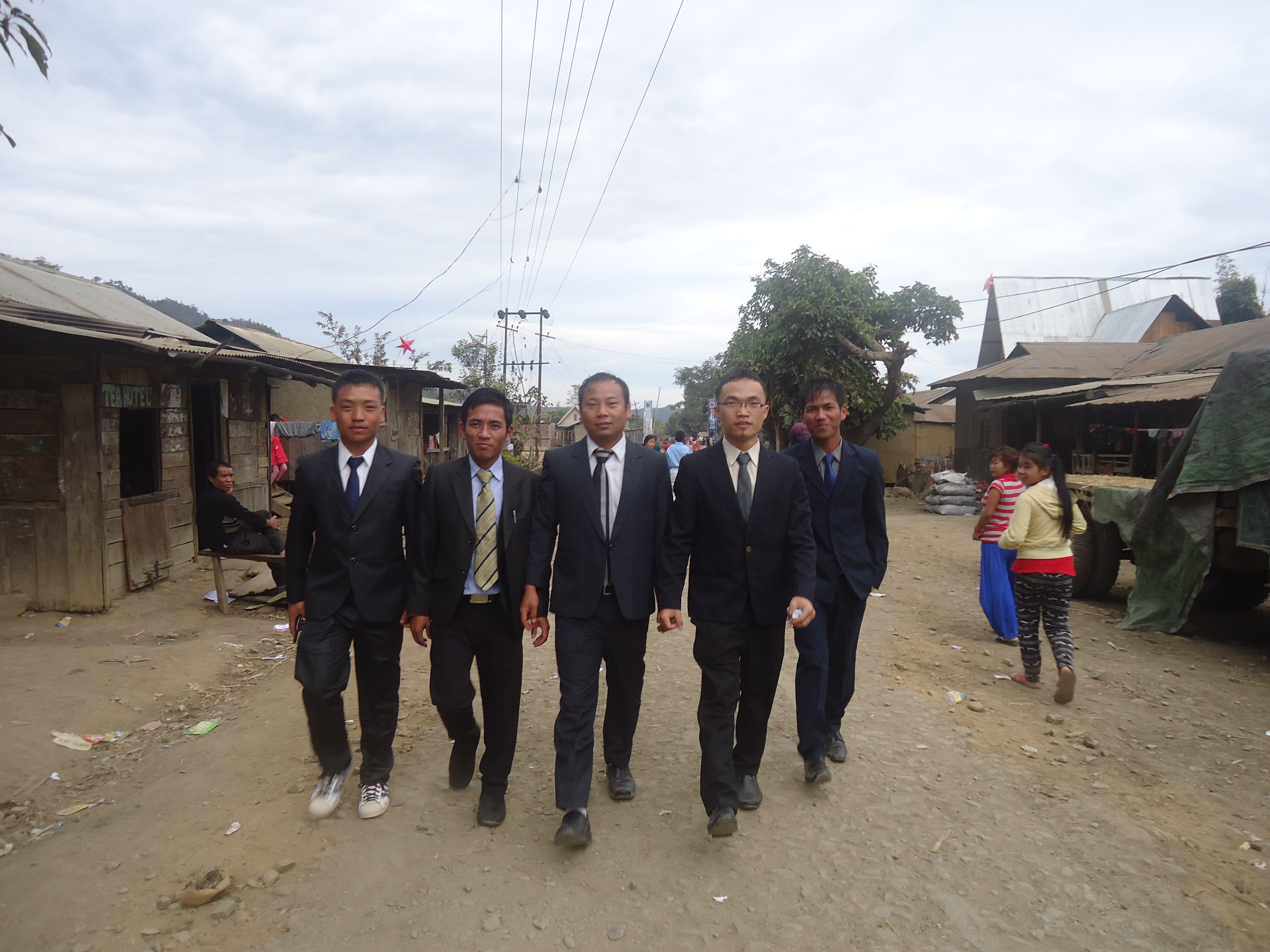
Main road

Sugnu and then Chakpirong, then to Paldai.

According to the recorded administrative division of the Government of India, Paldai is under the subdivision of Chakpikarong, Chandel District, Manipur. Or, People who wants to reach Padai village from Imphal city may travel via Lamka(Churachandpur) by bus or other vehicles. It is about 23-27 kilometers from Sugnu town

== Administration ==
The social and legal administrative systems in Paldai are based on the Kuki(Zo) customary law and order, which is a hereditary type. As of 2016, the head of the administration is Mr. T. Chinlianpau Zou, the eldest grandson of Helchin Taithul. Beside the General Assembly, there is a council of members called "The Village Authority," consisting of 11 members, in accordance with the provisions of the Constitution of India. These two governing bodies assist the headman of the village in crucial issues.

Paldai falls under the jurisdiction of Chakpikarong police station. The administration in Paldai village is based on traditional Chiefship system. The village Chief work in collaboration with Village Authority. This serve as a Council of leaders in the village. It also serve as a traditional judiciary branch to settle ever kind of dispute, cases and infrastructural development. Another striking feature of administration is that the traditional Chiefship is hereditary. For example, Pu Helchin was succeeded by his legally eldest son Pu ET Thangpu, Pu ET Thangpu by his eldest son Pu Chinlianpau. So, Pu Chinlianpau should be succeeded by his eldest son Thangginlian@Lawmpu in future.

== Demographics ==
According to the 2011 census:

- Males: 306, females: 269
  - Total: 575
- No. of persons between ages 0-6: 52 males and 37 females
- Sex ratio - ST: 877 Children: 712
- Number of Households (Census of India 2011): 134
- Literacy (2011)
  - Male: 86.6%
  - Female: 84%
