= Kakching Assembly constituency =

Legislative Assembly constituency in Manipur State, India

Coordinates: 24.5°N 93.98°E

Kakching
- Constituency for the Manipur Legislative Assembly

Constituency details
- Country: India
- Region: Northeast India
- State: Manipur
- District: Kakching
- Lok Sabha constituency: Outer Manipur
- Established: 1967
- Total electors: 30,499
- Reservation: None

Member of Legislative Assembly
- 12th Manipur Legislative Assembly
- Incumbent M. Rameshwar Singh
- Party: NPP
- Alliance: NDA
- Elected year: 2022

Kakching Legislative Assembly constituency is one of the 60 Legislative Assembly constituencies of Manipur state in India.

It is part of Kakching district.

== Members of the Legislative Assembly ==
Year	Member	Party
1967	Y. Nimai	Samyukta Socialist Party
1972	Yengkhom Nimai	Socialist Party
1974	Kshetri Irubot	Communist Party of India
1980	Kshetri Irabot	Communist Party of India
1984	Yengkhom Thambal	Independent politician
1990	N. Nimai Singh	Indian National Congress
1995	Kshetrimayum Irabot Singh	Communist Party of India
2000	N. Nimai Singh	Indian National Congress
2002	Thokchom Tomba Singh	Communist Party of India
2007	Yengkhom Surchandra Singh	Indian National Congress
2012	Yengkhom Surchandra Singh	Indian National Congress
2017	~~Yengkhom Surchandra Singh~~ (Note: Election declared null and void by the court)	Indian National Congress
2017	M. Rameshwar Singh	Bharatiya Janata Party
2022	Mayanglambam Rameshwar Singh	National People's Party

== Election results ==
Vote share of winning candidates
2022	31.49%
2017	46.20%
2012	62.16%
2007	51.28%
2002	51.66%
2000	29.42%
1995	39.75%
1990	49.33%
1984	35.47%
1980	38.13%
1974	36.89%
1972	35.58%
1967	36.71%

=== 2027 Assembly election ===
2027 Manipur Legislative Assembly election: Kakching
Party	Candidate	Votes	%	±%
INC				
NDA				
NOTA	None of the above			
Majority				
Turnout				
gain from		Swing		

=== 2022 Assembly election ===
2022 Manipur Legislative Assembly election: Kakching
Party	Candidate	Votes	%	±%
NPP	Mayanglambam Rameshwar Singh	8,546	31.49%	
BJP	Yengkhom Surchandra Singh	7,341	27.05%	−16.53%
INC	Kshetrimayum Kennedy Singh	5,873	21.64%	−24.55%
JD(U)	Naorem Nabachandra Singh	2,451	9.03%	
NCP	Yengkhom Nilachandra Singh	2,009	7.40%	
CPI	Yengkhom Roma Devi	676	2.49%	−6.70%
NOTA	Nota	239	0.88%	−0.15%
Margin of victory		1,205	4.44%	1.83%
Turnout		27,135	88.97%	2.53%
Registered electors		30,499		9.40%
NPP gain from INC		Swing	-14.70%	

=== 2017 Assembly election ===
Yengkhom Surchandra Singh was declared the winner of the election in 2017, but the second place candidate, M. Rameshwar Singh challenged his victory in the courts, citing non-divulgence of assets. The case was declared in favor of the plaintiff by the Sikkim High Court and M. Rameshwar Singh was declared to be the new MLA of Kakching.

2017 Manipur Legislative Assembly election: Kakching
Party	Candidate	Votes	%	±%
INC	Yengkhom Surchandra Singh	11,133	46.20%	−15.97%
BJP	Mayanglambam Rameshwar Singh	10,503	43.58%	
CPI	Naorem Achouba	2,215	9.19%	−28.64%
NOTA	None of the Above	249	1.03%	
Margin of victory		630	2.61%	−21.71%
Turnout		24,100	86.44%	1.47%
Registered electors		27,879		17.41%
INC hold		Swing	-15.97%	

=== 2012 Assembly election ===
2012 Manipur Legislative Assembly election: Kakching
Party	Candidate	Votes	%	±%
INC	Yengkhom Surchandra Singh	12,543	62.16%	10.88%
CPI	Naorem Achouba	7,634	37.83%	−4.08%
Margin of victory		4,909	24.33%	14.96%
Turnout		20,178	84.97%	−2.64%
Registered electors		23,746		−1.95%
INC hold		Swing	10.88%	

=== 2007 Assembly election ===
2007 Manipur Legislative Assembly election: Kakching
Party	Candidate	Votes	%	±%
INC	Yengkhom Surchandra Singh	10,881	51.28%	10.05%
CPI	Thokchom Tomba	8,894	41.92%	−9.75%
MPP	Kshetrimayum Irabot Singh	1,444	6.81%	
Margin of victory		1,987	9.36%	−1.07%
Turnout		21,219	87.62%	1.11%
Registered electors		24,218		14.44%
INC gain from CPI		Swing	-0.38%	

=== 2002 Assembly election ===
2002 Manipur Legislative Assembly election: Kakching
Party	Candidate	Votes	%	±%
CPI	Thokchom Tomba	9,377	51.66%	30.04%
INC	Nongmaithem Nimai Singh	7,483	41.23%	11.80%
Independent	Yengkhom Thambal	1,290	7.11%	
Margin of victory		1,894	10.44%	2.63%
Turnout		18,150	86.50%	−4.39%
Registered electors		21,162		3.42%
CPI gain from INC		Swing	11.91%	

=== 2000 Assembly election ===
2000 Manipur Legislative Assembly election: Kakching
Party	Candidate	Votes	%	±%
INC	N. Nimai Singh	5,398	29.42%	−8.88%
CPI	Thokchom Tomba Singh	3,966	21.62%	−18.13%
MSCP	Kshetrimayum Irabot	3,515	19.16%	
FPM	A. Satar Yumkhaibam	3,284	17.90%	
BJP	Shougaijam Kulachandra Singh	1,755	9.57%	
NCP	Naorem Nabachandra	427	2.33%	
Margin of victory		1,432	7.81%	6.36%
Turnout		18,345	90.25%	−0.65%
Registered electors		20,462		8.08%
INC gain from CPI		Swing	-10.33%	

=== 1995 Assembly election ===
1995 Manipur Legislative Assembly election: Kakching
Party	Candidate	Votes	%	±%
CPI	Kshetrimayum Irabot Singh	6,773	39.75%	0.94%
INC	Nongmaithem Nimai Singh	6,526	38.30%	−11.03%
JD	Yengkhom Thambal Singh	3,552	20.85%	
MPP	Mayanglambam Tomal Deya Meitei	188	1.10%	
Margin of victory		247	1.45%	−9.08%
Turnout		17,039	90.89%	5.31%
Registered electors		18,933		−0.92%
CPI gain from INC		Swing	-9.58%	

=== 1990 Assembly election ===
1990 Manipur Legislative Assembly election: Kakching
Party	Candidate	Votes	%	±%
INC	N. Nimai Singh	7,963	49.33%	21.94%
CPI	Ksh. Irabot	6,264	38.81%	9.74%
JD	Y. Thambal	1,786	11.06%	
Margin of victory		1,699	10.53%	4.12%
Turnout		16,141	85.58%	−4.35%
Registered electors		19,108		25.96%
INC gain from Independent		Swing	13.86%	

=== 1984 Assembly election ===
1984 Manipur Legislative Assembly election: Kakching
Party	Candidate	Votes	%	±%
Independent	Yengkhom Thambal	4,741	35.47%	
CPI	Kshetri Iraoji	3,885	29.07%	−9.06%
INC	Nongmaithem Nimai	3,661	27.39%	
Independent	Mutum Ramdhon Singh	1,078	8.07%	
Margin of victory		856	6.40%	2.48%
Turnout		13,365	89.93%	4.03%
Registered electors		15,170		11.58%
Independent gain from CPI		Swing	-2.65%	

=== 1980 Assembly election ===
1980 Manipur Legislative Assembly election: Kakching
Party	Candidate	Votes	%	±%
CPI	Kshetri Irabot	4,365	38.13%	1.24%
JP	Yengkhom Thambal	3,916	34.20%	
INC(I)	Nongmaithem Modhu	2,868	25.05%	
MPP	Kshetrimayum Gobardhon	300	2.62%	−7.88%
Margin of victory		449	3.92%	−2.37%
Turnout		11,449	85.90%	−6.66%
Registered electors		13,596		26.65%
CPI hold		Swing	1.24%	

=== 1974 Assembly election ===
1974 Manipur Legislative Assembly election: Kakching
Party	Candidate	Votes	%	±%
CPI	Kshetri Irubot	3,622	36.89%	6.05%
Socialist Labour Party (India)	Yengkhom Nimal	3,004	30.59%	
INC	Nongmaithem Bidhu Singh	2,162	22.02%	−11.57%
MPP	Naorem Chandramani	1,031	10.50%	
Margin of victory		618	6.29%	4.30%
Turnout		9,819	92.56%	4.42%
Registered electors		10,735		−6.48%
CPI gain from Socialist Labour Party (India)		Swing	1.31%	

=== 1972 Assembly election ===
1972 Manipur Legislative Assembly election: Kakching
Party	Candidate	Votes	%	±%
Socialist Labour Party (India)	Yengkhom Nimai	3,544	35.58%	
INC	Mayanglambam I Botobi	3,345	33.58%	8.43%
CPI	Kshe Rimayum Irabot	3,071	30.83%	
Margin of victory		199	2.00%	−9.56%
Turnout		9,960	88.13%	7.71%
Registered electors		11,479		−35.83%
Socialist Labour Party (India) gain from SSP		Swing	-1.13%	

=== 1967 Assembly election ===
1967 Manipur Legislative Assembly election: Kakching
Party	Candidate	Votes	%	±%
SSP	Y. Nimai	5,095	36.71%	
INC	M. Ibotombi	3,491	25.15%	
Independent	N. J. Singh	2,568	18.50%	
Independent	L. Khomdon	1,876	13.52%	
Independent	N. Komla	849	6.12%	
Margin of victory		1,604	11.56%	
Turnout		13,879	80.42%	
Registered electors		17,889		
SSP win (new seat)				

== See also ==
- List of constituencies of the Manipur Legislative Assembly
- Thoubal district
