= Kapaam =

Coordinates: 24.417°N 94.010°E

Kapaam, also known as Komlathabi, is a village in Chandel District, Manipur, India. The village is 49 km from Imphal and 15 km from Chandel District Headquarters. Komlathabi Population - Chandel, Manipur Komlathabi is a medium size village located in Chandel Sub Division of Chandel district, Manipur with total 198 families residing. The Komlathabi village has population of 945 of which 433 are males while 512 are females as per Population Census 2011.

In Komlathabi village, population of children with age 0-6 is 94 which makes up 9.95% of total population of village. Average Sex Ratio of Komlathabi village is 1182 which is higher than Manipur state average of 985. Child Sex Ratio for the Komlathabi as per census is 741, lower than Manipur average of 930.

Komlathabi village has higher literacy rate compared to Manipur. In 2011, literacy rate of Komlathabi village was 94.36% compared to 76.94% of Manipur. In Komlathabi Male literacy stands at 96.83% while female literacy rate was 92.37%.

As per constitution of India and Panchyati Raaj Act, Komlathabi village is administrated by Sarpanch (Head of Village) who is elected representative of village.

On the education front, the village has one Government school, one private school and one Aided government school, namely- Liwachangning Government High School, Springdale and Union Model Aided High School respectively. Besides this, there is one Government college and a private Higher secondary school, namely - South East Manipur College and South East Manipur Higher Secondary School.

Apart from this, the village also boasts of having one Government Primary Health Centre fully functional 24/7 in the vicinity.
