= Pallel =

- Town
- Location in Manipur, India Pallel (India)
- Coordinates: 24°27′0″N 94°2′0″E
- Country: India
- State: Manipur
- District: Kakching
- Elevation: 830 m (2,720 ft)

Population (2011)
  - Total: 4,193

Languages
  - Official: Meiteilon (Manipuri)
- Time zone: UTC+5:30 (IST)
- PIN: 795135
- Telephone code: 03848
- Vehicle registration: MN
- Climate: 4 to 30 degree Celsius (Köppen)
- Avg. summer temperature: 30 °C (86 °F)
- Avg. winter temperature: 4 °C (39 °F)
- Website: manipur.gov.in

Pallel is a town in Kakching district of Manipur, India. It is the gateway to the Tran-Asian super Highway. It is situated in NH-39, 46 km southeast of the capital Imphal.

== People ==
BK Nehru, the first governor of Manipur, once said, "If you want to see all types of people of Manipur, go to Pallel gate." Pallel is known for its wide range of people of different communities living together in harmony peacefully. The Lamkangs, the Marings, the Aimols, the Kukis, the Meiteis, etc. live together.

== Education ==
Being a business centre, the education system is not up to the mark. There are high schools but colleges are yet to be established. The nearest college is situated at Komlathabi, which is 5 km from Pallel. Some of the schools in Pallel are

- The Ideal High School, Molnoi
- MG Evergreen High Secondary School, Tuishimi
- VM High School, H. Wajang
- Pallel High School.
- The Trinity High School, Maringphai
- Cornerstone High School, Lhunnajang
- Amita Memorial children school
- The Renaissance Academy

== Business ==
Pallel is located 62 kilometres (39 mi) away from Moreh, the chief business centre in Manipur. it is good place to start business either in the form of International or domestic.
