= Sajik Tampak =

- Village
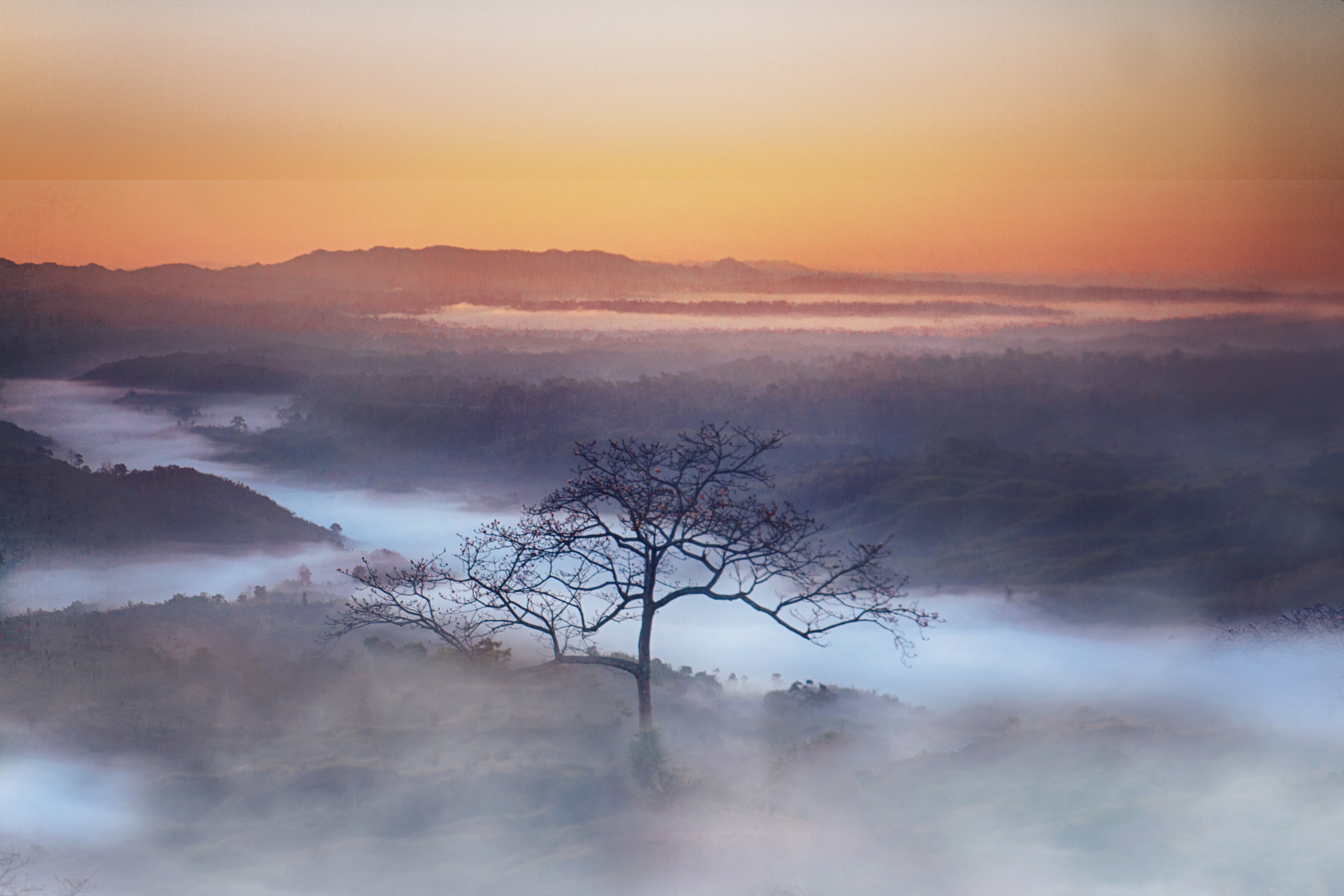
- Sajik Tampak valley
- Interactive map of Sajik Tampak
- Location within Manipur Location within India
- Coordinates: 24.138°N 93.840°E
- Country: India
- State: Manipur
- District: Chandel

Population
  - Total: 1,563

Sajik Tampak is a village situated in Chandel district of Manipur, India. It is also name of the valley in the Chakpikarong subdivision of the district, which carries the river Kana Lok, a tributary of the Manipur River.

== Geography ==
Kana Lok is a tributary of the Manipur River that flows north and joins the latter near L. Molnom. The wide valley of the river close to its mouth is named "Sajik Tampak". It is 6 kilometres (3.7 mi) long, and 1 to 2 kilometres wide. The average elevation of the valley is 900 metres (3,000 ft) above the mean sea level, with a climate similar to that of Imphal Valley. The valley is noted for its fertility and "agricultural abundance".

The Kana Lok valley provides a clandestine route to the Chin State of Myanmar, landing opposite Lenikot. The region is a hotbed of insurgents and arms dealers. People's Liberation Army of Manipur (PLA), People's Revolutionary Party of Kangleipak (PREPAK), United National Liberation Front (UNLF), Zou People Council, and United Kuki Liberation Front (UKLF) are some of the militant groups that have been active in the area. There is also a large army base at Sajik Tampak, manned by Assam Rifles, Border Security Force, and Indian Army. Military operations and clashes with militants are often reported.

== History ==
Sajik Tampak was listed among the hill villages of Tengnoupal Circle in 1957. Other villages in Sajik Tampak valley listed were Longza, Haika, Paldai, Genlngai and Tuinou.

== Demographics ==
The 2011 census lists a population about 1562 people, among whom 1171 are males and 391 are females. The village has 171 households. (Note: A possible explanation of the anomalous data is that soldiers from the nearby army base were included in the population.)

A total of 1235 people are literate in the village Sajik Tampak.
