= Anāl language =

Sino-Tibetan language

Anāl
- Native to: India and Myanmar
- Region: Southeast Manipur
- Ethnicity: Anāl Naga
- Native speakers: (14,000 cited 2001 census)
- Language family: Sino-Tibetan: Tibeto-Burman; Kuki-Chin-Mizo; Kuki-Chin; Northwestern; Anāl
- Writing system: Latin script, Meitei script (to lesser extent)

Language codes
- ISO 639-3: anm
- Glottolog: anal1239
- ELP: Anal

Anāl, also known as Namfau after the two principal villages it is spoken in, is a Kuki-Chin language, belonging to the Northwestern or "Old Kuki" subfamily, spoken by the Anal people in India and a dwindling number in Burma. It had 13,900 speakers in India according to the 2001 census, and 50 in Burma in 2010. The speakers of this language use the Meitei language as their second language (L2) according to the Ethnologue.

The Department of Language Planning and Implementation of the Government of Manipur offers a sum of ₹5,000 (equivalent to ₹8,500 or US$89 in 2023), to every individual who learns Anal language, under certain terms and conditions.

Anal is also written in the Latin script, with a literacy rate of about 74%.

== Geographical distribution ==
Anal is spoken in southeastern Manipur, in the Chandel district, on the banks of the Chakpi River in towns such as Chandel and Chakpikarong, and also in the Tengnoupal district (Ethnologue).

== Phonology ==
=== Consonants ===
		Labial	Alveolar	Palatal	Velar	Glottal
Nasal	voiceless	m̥	n̥		ŋ̊	
Nasal	voiced	m	n		ŋ	
Plosive/ Affricate	aspirated	pʰ	tʰ		kʰ	
Plosive/ Affricate	voiceless	p	t	tʃ	k	
Plosive/ Affricate	voiced	b	d	dʒ		
Fricative			s			h
Approximant	voiced	ʋ	l			
Approximant	voiceless		l̥			
Rhotic	voiced		r			
Rhotic	voiceless		r̥			

/dʒ/ can also be heard as a glide [j] in free variation.

=== Vowels ===
	Front	Central	Back
Close	i		u
Mid	e	ə	o
Open		a	

== Vocabulary ==
The following vocabulary exemplifies words in the language.

Anal	gloss	Anal	gloss
khol	'deep hole'; 'social division'	ahno	'kind of short skirt'
lunguin	'kind of long shawl'	zupar	'rice beer'
piruili	'elopement'	Jol min	'bride price'
ithin	'divorce'	sinnuperu	'adultery'
pakum	'hearth'	mote	'first-born'
kopu	'second-born'	cakhow	'brown rice'
khon	'fifty rupees'	thunlon	'grave'
dao	'kind of iron blade'	shingkho	'plate'
vopum	'basket'	athiru	'kind of bead necklace'
akarfo	'kind of China necklace'	sanamba	'kind of fiddle'
tilli	'kind of flageolet'	tuklee	'kind of loom'

== Bibliography ==
- Bareh, Hamlet (2007). Encyclopaedia of North-East India: Manipur. Vol. III. New Delhi: Mittal. ISBN 978-81-7099-790-0.
- Prakash, Col Ved (2007). Encyclopaedia of North-East India. New Delhi: Atlantic. ISBN 978-81-269-0708-3.
