= Thounaojam =

Thounaojam is a yumnak (Meitei for 'family name' / 'surname') belonging to the Luwang clan of Meitei ethnicity. Notable people with the family name are:

- Thounaojam Shyamkumar Singh, Indian politician
- Thounaojam Chaoba Singh, Indian politician
- Thounaogam Dinesh Singh, Indian footballer
- Jeakson Singh Thounaojam, Indian footballer
- Bipin Singh Thounaojam, Indian footballer
