= Kakching Khunou =

Municipal council in Manipur, India

- Municipal council
- Location in Manipur, India Kakching Khunou (India)
- Coordinates: 24.40°N 93.90°E
- Country: India
- State: Manipur
- District: Kakching

Government
  - M. L. A.: Kangujam Ranjit

Population (2011)
  - Total: 11,379

Languages
  - Official: Meiteilon (Manipuri)
- Time zone: UTC+5:30 (IST)
- PIN: 795 103
- Telephone code: + 91 3848
- Vehicle registration: MN-04
- Sex ratio: 1:1.04 ♂/♀
- Website: manipur.gov.in

Kakching Khunou is an agricultural town in Kakching district in Manipur, India. Situated at a distance of 56 km (35 mi) from Imphal, it is surrounded by hillocks and agricultural land. Tarang Turel, a rivulet flowing down from the eastern hills, runs through the middle of the town serving as a natural spring. It is connected to other parts of the state by the Imphal-Sugnu state highway.

== Demographics ==
As of the 2011 Census of India, Kakching Khunou had a population of 11,379. Males constitute 52% of the population and females 48%. It has an average literacy rate of 66.74% (Male literacy: 75.43%, and female literacy: 57.27%), lower than the national average of 74.04%. In Kakching Khunou, 12% of the population is under 6 years of age.

== History ==
As the name clearly indicates, the people inhabiting Kakching Khunou had once migrated or bifurcated from Kakching. It is believed that these people under the leadership of Khamlangba first came from the west (of Manipur) and settled down at Uripok, Imphal though their pre-historic records could not be traced. These laborious people in search of their iron-ore moved from Uripok towards the south and settled for sometime near Kshetri Leikai of present Thoubal, during the reign of Charailongba (49th King of Manipur 1697–1709 A.D.) Shortly thereafter, they migrated to Kakching Khuman near Pallel. During the reign of Garib Niwas (50th King of Manipur 1709–1748 A.D.) Kakching was governed by Budhiraj. In the year 1790, during the reign of Bheigyachandra, they shifted to the present Kakching site while some sections moved further south and settled at Kakching Khunou. During the reign of Chourajit in 1726(Saka) one Leimapokpam Chandra was transported as Loi at Kakching Khunou which is evident of the village having existed.

The Historical evidence of these people can easily be traced from many authentic books and records. Special mention in this connection can be made of that of Captain R. Boileau Pemberton's "Report on the Eastern Frontier of British India,1835" in which he described at page 30

"..Kokshing lungsaee, Kokshing Khunao, Kokshing Khoolen and Langathel are the principal villages at which the iron works are carried on, under the direction of Cheiftains [sic?] called Budhiraj Rajah, who claims for his ancestors the merit of having first discovered the existence of iron-ore in the valley and of rendering it subserve into the use of man".

And these professional people were also governed through the leadership of one Khullakpa as Hudson clearly mentioned in his book "The Meitheis" (page 72). In Gazetteer of Manipur Capt. E.W. Dun clearly stated the settlement of Kakching Khunou village. Moreover, all the Kakching Villages in manipur worshipped Khamlangba and Sekmai Ningthou as their Umanglai (Forest Deity), which are the symbols of iron.

== Genealogy ==
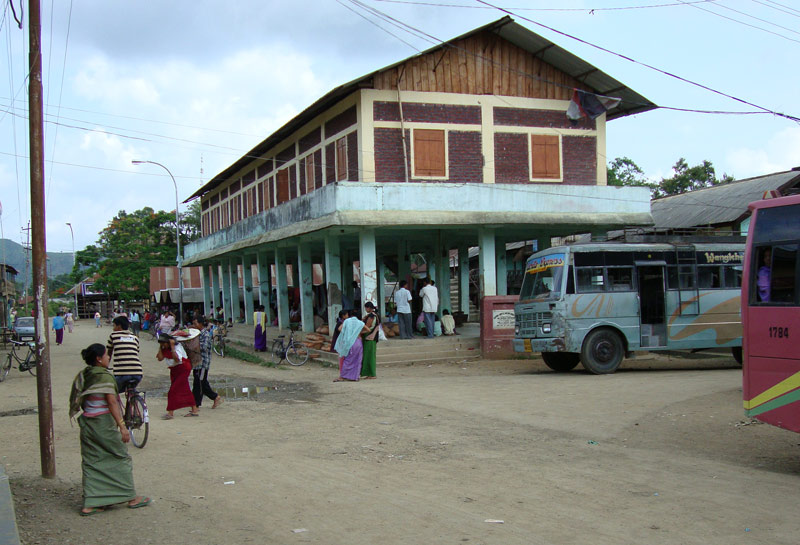
Kakching Khunou Bazar

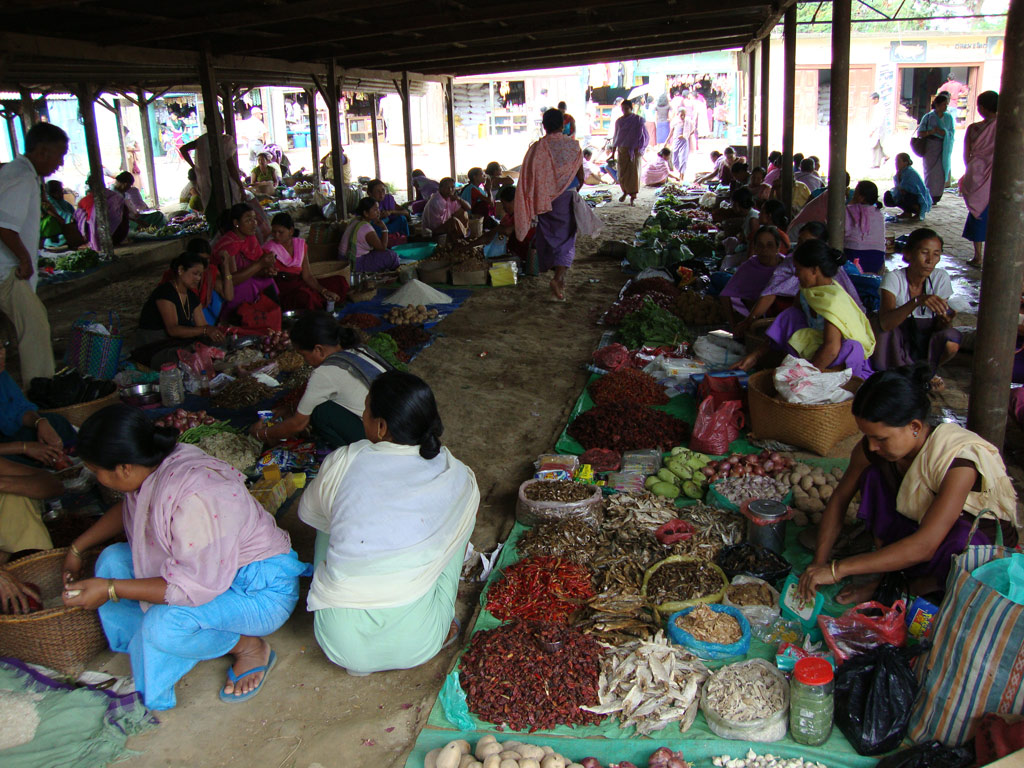
Vegetables and Dried Fish Market, KakchKakchingou

The population of Kakching Khunou was composed of 15 Yumnaks (surnames) each Yumnak settling as a group under one elder known as Piba, altogether intertwined and also intermingled with one another up to 1886. The 15 Yumnaks are :

- Khumukcham
- Mayanglambam
- Thingnam
- Sarangthem
- Kshetrimayum
- Angom
- Khaidem
- Laishram
- Leimapokpam
- Keisham
- Irom
- Amom
- Sanasam
- Khongbantabam
- Ngangom

Moreover, the following Brahman clans who settled down permanently as Sevayets of the Deities, worshiped by these people when they were converted into Hinduism, are also found in kakching Khunou. The clans are –

- Kakchingtabam
- Hidangmayum
- Aribam
- Gotimayum
- Gurumayum

In the later years many individuals of different clans came to Kakching Khunou and settled down permanently. They are:

- Achom
- Adhikarimayum
- Athokpam
- Chingtham
- Elangbam
- Hamom
- Heikrujam
- Heisnam
- Hidam
- Huidrom
- Huirem
- Irengbam
- Irungbam
- Khangenbam
- Khumanthem
- Khundrakpam
- Konjengbam
- Langpoklakpam
- Lourembam
- Lukram
- Mairenbam
- Moirangthem
- Nahakpam
- Narekpam
- Ngasheppam
- Ningthoujam
- Nongmaithem
- Okram
- Phairembam
- Potshangbam
- Pukhrambam
- Puyam
- Raj Kumar (R.K.)
- Sagolsem
- Salam
- Samurailatpam
- Sapam
- Shamjetshabam
- Sinam
- Soibam
- Sorokhaibam
- Takhellambam
- Thokchom
- Thongam
- Thounaojam
- Ushekpam
- Yenkhom
- Yumnam etc.

== Religion ==
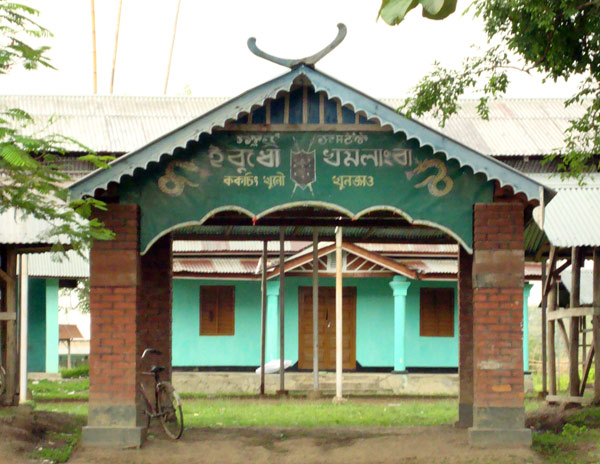
Ibudhou Khamlangba Laikon

The pre-historic religion of the Kakchings prior to their arrival at Uripok cannot be traced, but it can definitely be counted that they adopted the Meitei religion before their conversion into Hinduism. In describing the Kakching Lois, Capt. E.W.Dun in his book, Gazetteer of Manipur (page 129) had quoted the writings of Sir James Johnstone in connection with their religion,

"..they were Lois but now called themselves Hindoos, having some time since 1867 been adopted into the Hindoo community by the Rajah, and they give themselves all the airs of Hindoos!"

The people of Kakching Khunou also worship "Ibudhou Khamlangba" and "Ibudhou Sekmai Ningthou" as their Umanglai (Forest God) which are the symbols of iron.

The majority of the population follows Hinduism. Some follow the old Meitei religion of Sanamahism and a minuscule section of the population has embraced Christianity.

== Education ==
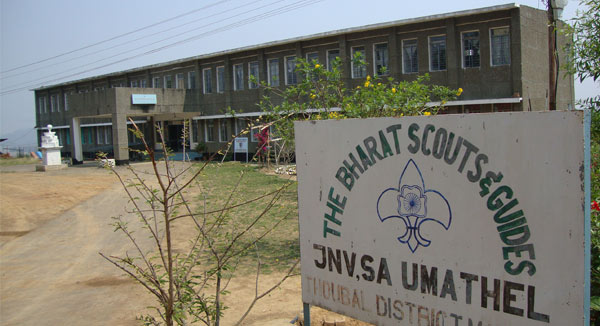
Academic Block, JNV Shandumba Achouba

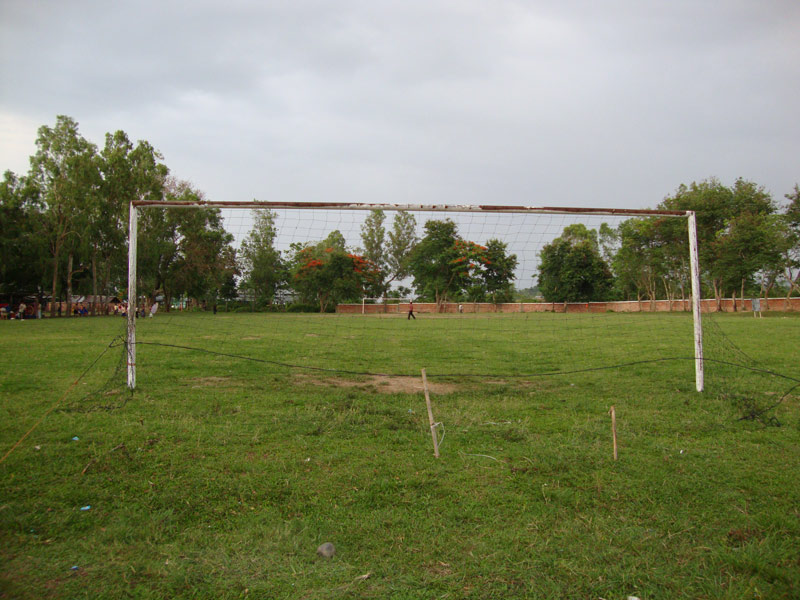
Kakching Khunou Govt. High School Playground

=== College(s)in Kakching Khunou ===
- Kakching Khunou College (Full-fledged Govt. College)

=== School(s)in Kakching Khunou ===
- Jawahar Navodaya Vidyalaya, Shandumba Achouba
- Kakching Khunou Govt. High School
- Kakching Khunou Makha High School
- Chekshapat High School
- Holy Cross School
- Khomdonbi Memorial English School(KBM)
- Emmanuel English School, Tampakyum
- Hijam Irabot Memorial(HIM)Public School
- Gems Academy
- Bright Career Academy
- Kakching Khunou Cheksapat P.S
- Kakching Khunou Boys' L.P. School
- Kakching Khunou Girls' L.P. School
- Kakching Khunou Tampakyum L.P. School
- Thongam Mondum P.S
- The Rising Sun English school

== Healthcare ==
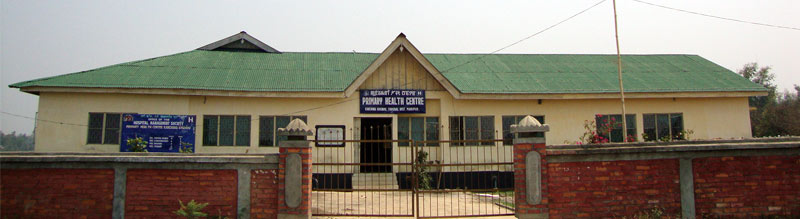
Primary Health Centre, Kakching Khunou

There is a Primary Health Center at Kakching Khunou.

== General information ==
The nearest Post Office and Police Station are at Kakching and Waikhong respectively. There is a Branch Post Office (B.P.O.) at Kakching Khunou.

The bordering villages are Waikhong, Wangoo, Wangjing Khunou, Lengangching (Lamkang Naga Village), New Chayang (Lamkang Naga Village), Aihang (Kuki Village) and Tokpaching.

== Picture gallery ==
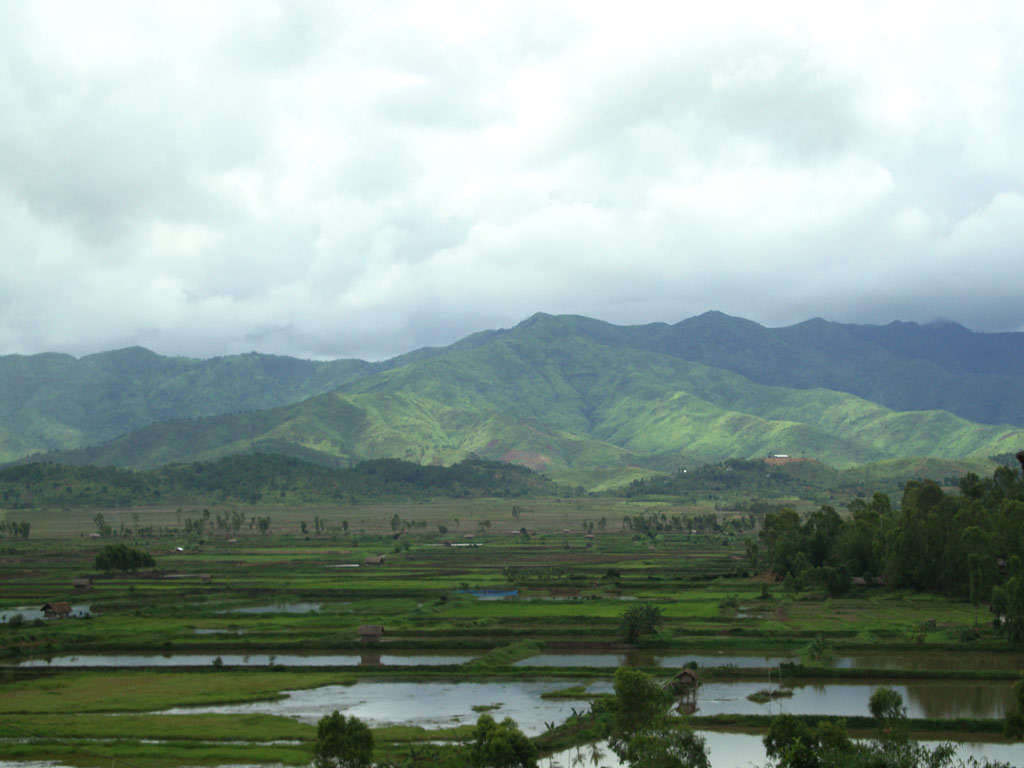
Pumlen Lake, the second largest freshwater lake in Manipur.

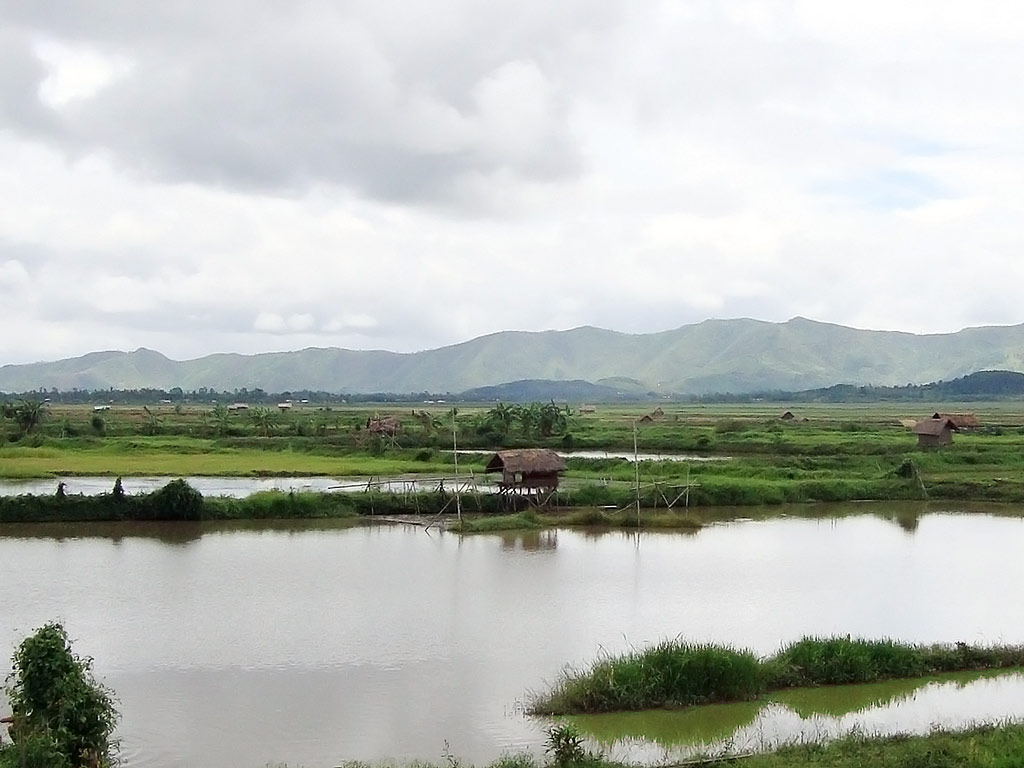
Pumlen Lake

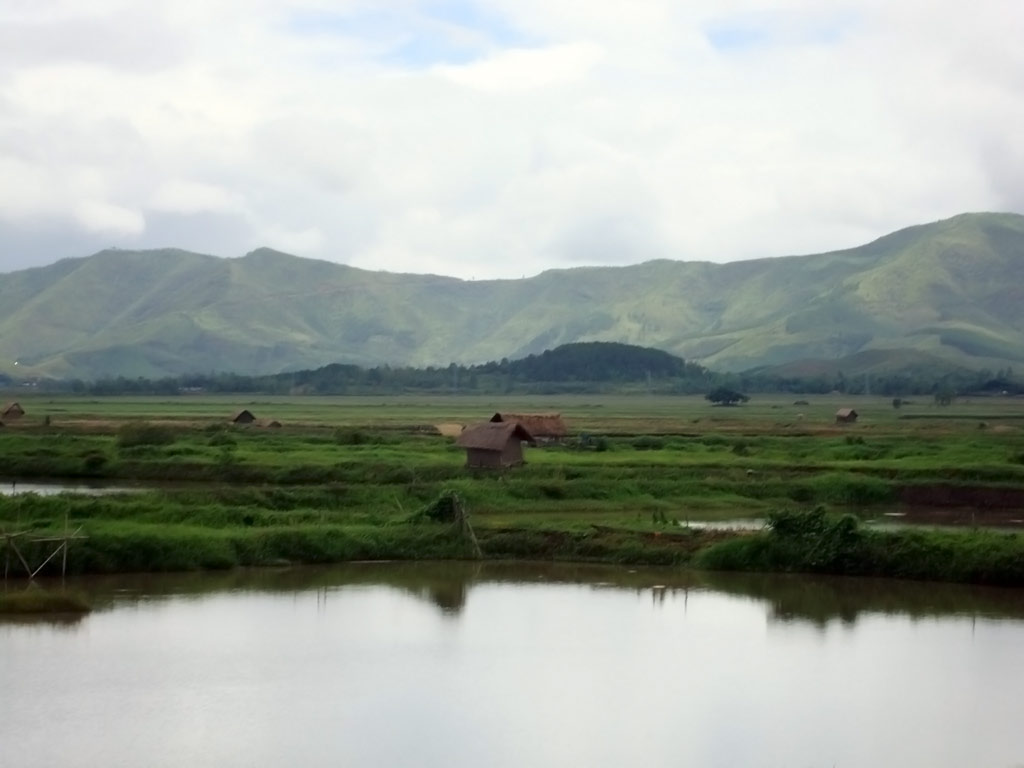
Fish Farming at the periphery of the Pumlen Lake

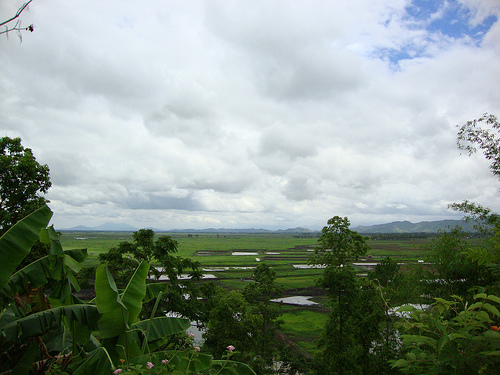
Another scenic beauty of the Pumlen Lake. Pumlen is one of the 19 surviving lakes out of the 155 lakes nature has endowed Manipur.

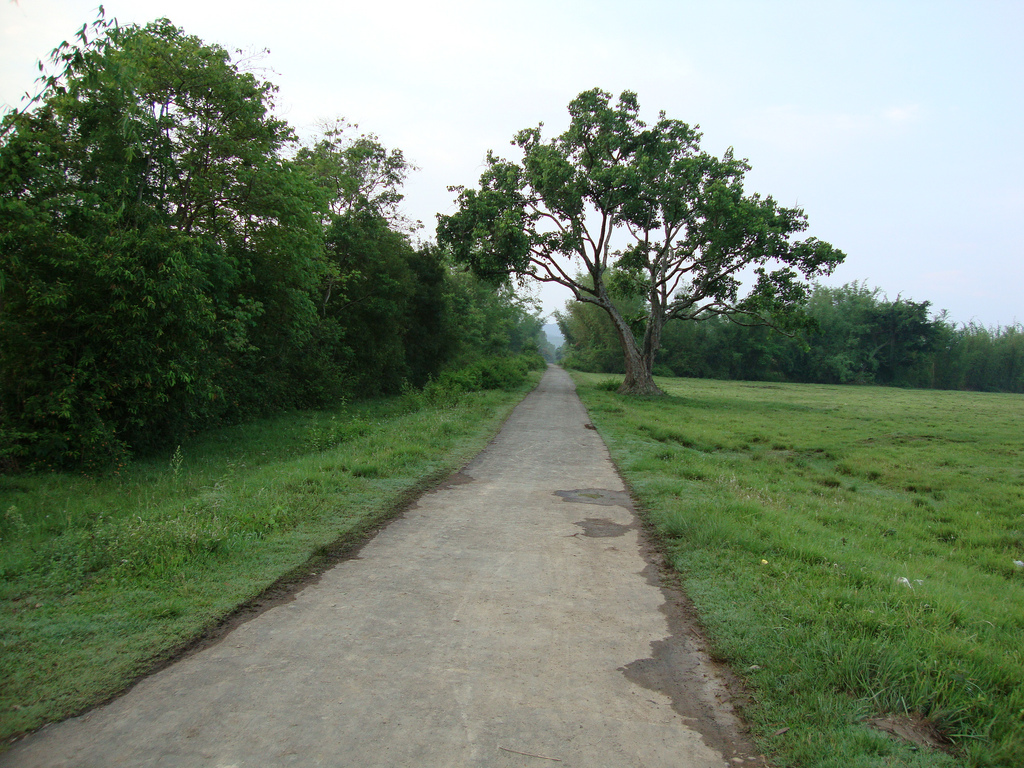
Inter Village Road connecting Kakching Khunou to Umathel

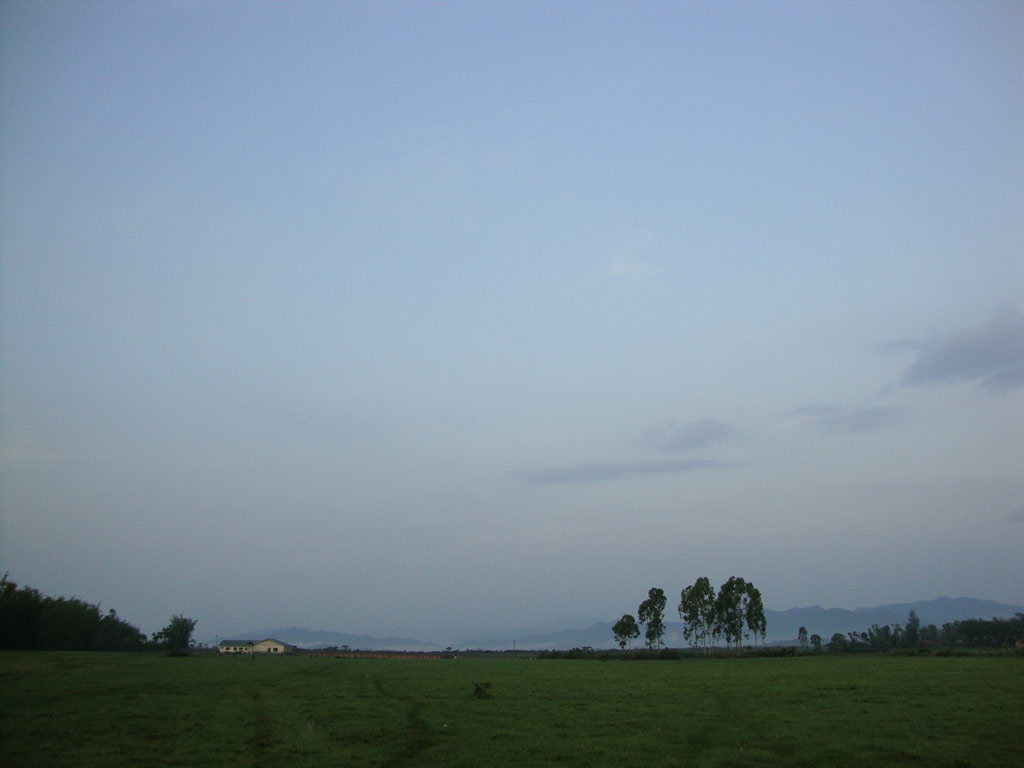
Lush Green Playground at Kakching Khunou

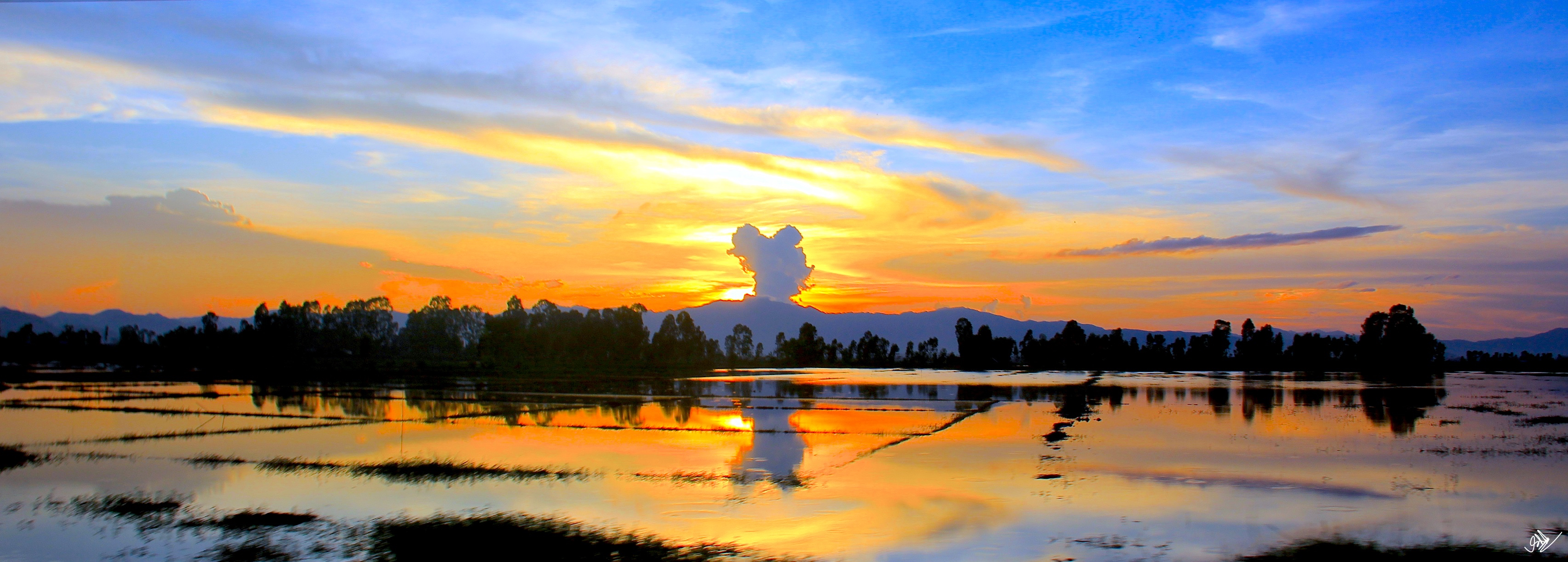
