= Wabagai =

- Town
- Location in Manipur, India Wabagai (India)
- Coordinates: 24.53°N 93.93°E
- Country: India
- State: Manipur
- District: Kakching
- Elevation: 778 m (2,552 ft)

Population (2011)
  - Total: 8,578

Languages
  - Official: Meiteilon (Manipuri)
- Time zone: UTC+5:30 (IST)
- PIN: 795103
- Telephone code: 03848
- Vehicle registration: MN
- Website: manipur.gov.in

Wabagai is a town in Kakching district in Manipur, India. It is located on the bank to the Sekmai river.

== Geography ==
Wabagai is located at . It has an average elevation of 778 metres (2555 feet). It is located 39 km to the south east from Imphal.

== Education ==
Wabagai Higher secondary school is the oldest and famous school in and around the town. It is a co-educational in structure. Courses run from standard VI to XII. Medium of instruction is Meitei.Apart from this there are some private run schools also such as The Amutombi Devine Life English School at Lamkhai Bazar, Grace Reach Academy at Hiyanglam Lai Panghanba, The Pole Star School at Wabagai Bamon Leirak, etc.

== Transportation ==
Mayai Lambi road, state highway connects the Imphal with the national highway no 39 at Kakching through Wabagai. Wabagai connects with Sugnu by Wabagai-Sugunu road.

== Agriculture ==
Paddy (Rice) is the main crop grown all around the town. Wabagai is famous for the production of cabbage and cauliflower in Manipur. Small scale poultry and piggery farmings are also seen here.

== Shopping centre ==
Wabagai Lamkhai is the main shopping centre in Wabagai. Agricultural commodities especially fruits and vegetables are very famous here. It is very busy during the morning hours as the export of the vegetable and other agricultural commodities to the other parts of the Manipur are done during this time.

== Music ==
People of Wabagai love music. Many famous singers are also associated from this place. Baby Pusparani, a singer of modern Meitei song is from Wabagai.

== Demographics ==
As of 2011 India census, Wabagai is a large village located in Kakching district, Manipur with total 1810 families residing. The Wabagai village has population of 8578 of which 4292 are males while 4286 are females as per Population Census 2011. In Wabagai village population of children with age 0-6 is 1196 which makes up 13.94 % of total population of village. Average Sex Ratio of Wabagai village is 999 which is higher than Manipur state average of 985. Child Sex Ratio for the Wabagai as per census is 917, lower than Manipur average of 930

== Politics ==
Wabagai assembly constituency (Assembly Constituency No. 36) is part of Outer Manipur (Lok Sabha constituency).
