= Wangoo =

- Village
- Location within Manipur Location within India
- Coordinates: 24.3862°N 93.8604°E
- Country: India
- State: Manipur
- District: Kakching

Population (2011)
  - Total: 6,134

Languages
  - Official: Meiteilon (Manipuri)
- Time zone: UTC+5:30 (IST)
- Vehicle registration: MN
- Website: manipur.gov.in

Wangoo is a village in the Kakching district of the Indian state of Manipur. It is situated approximately 64 km south of the state capital, Imphal. It has an area of 13.05 km^{2} with a population of 6,134.

== Geography ==
Wangoo is located at 24.3862°N 93.8604°E. The geographical area of the village is 13.05 km^{2}, thus is the biggest village by area in the district. The Imphal River passes through Wangoo.

== Demographics ==
As of 2011 India census, Wangoo had a population of 6,134, of which 3,095 are males while 3,039 are females. The population of children ages 0–6 is 734, thus being 11.96% of the total population of Wangoo. The average sex ratio of the village is 982, lower than Manipur state average of 985. The child sex ratio for the village, as per census, is 1,022, higher than the Manipur average of 930. Wangoo has a lower literacy rate compared to the Manipur average. In 2011, the literacy rate of Wangoo was 67.09%, compared to the 76.94% average of Manipur. In Wangoo, male literacy stands at 76.43% while female literacy rate is 57.53%.

== Economy ==
Agriculture is the main source of income for the majority of the population. Of the total population, 2,862 were engaged in work activities. Of those, 1,692 are cultivators (owner or co-owner) while 185 were agricultural labourers.

== Education ==
The literacy rate is low compared to other villages in Manipur. There are no colleges in Wangoo.

=== Schools in Wangoo ===
- Wangoo Laipham High School
- Wangoo Laipham Primary School
- Wangoo Awang Leikai Primary School
- The Great Academy
- Wangoo Sandakhong Primary School
- Wangoo Mamang Sabal Primary School
- Green Ground Academy
- Wangoo Higher secondary school

== Culture ==
Wangoo Baji Leihao

Wangoo celebrated 10-day long Tampha Lairembi Haraoba in the summer season. Many people from other places came here to participate Mukna on the last day of Lai Haraoba. And also celebrated Wangoo Baji Haraoba for one day in the spring season. Wangoo Baji was a maichou, a learned man well versed in the Meitei traditional knowledge. It is said that he disappeared into thin air one fine day. Before his disappearance, he had said to the people around that he would come back and when he did come back, the dried up leihao Magnolia champaca tree standing there would spring back to life. When the tree started budding again after many many years later, it was widely believed that he had come back to life, possibly reborn.

Napachik, a small hillock in Wangoo village was excavated by the Department of Archaeology, Government of Manipur in 1983. Some tools used by the Neolithic people were discovered at the site. Microliths were also collected from the excavation.

== Transportation ==
It is connected to other parts of the state by the Imphal-Sugnu state highway and the Imphal-Churachandpur highway, through NH-150.

== Health care services ==
Wangoo has a government run Primary Health Centre at Wangoo Laipham Chuthek Leikai.

== Politics ==
Wagoo is under the constituency of Sugnu and is part of the Outer Manipur (Lok Sabha constituency).
