= Sugnu =

Sugnu Sugunu
- town
- Interactive map of Sugnu
- Location in Manipur, India Sugnu (India)
- Coordinates: 24.2963°N 93.8748°E
- Country: India
- State: Manipur
- District: Kakching, Chandel
- Elevation: 775 m (2,543 ft)

Population (2011)
  - Total: 7,521

Languages
  - Official: Meitei
- Time zone: UTC+5:30 (IST)
- Telephone code: 0091
- Vehicle registration: MN

Sugnu (also spelt Sugnoo) is a town at the southern end of the Imphal Valley in Manipur, India. Part of the town is in Kakching district, administered by municipal council, and the other part is in Chandel district under four separate villages. Sugnu is on the bank of the Manipur River, to the east of Churachandpur district and Bishnupur district.

== Geography ==
Its average altitude is 764 metres (2509 feet).

The town is about 74 km from the capital of Manipur, Imphal.

The Manipur River passes through Sugnu and connects to Chakpi River at Serou.

=== Transportation ===
Sugnu is connected with the capital city Imphal through the Imphal–Sugnu State Highway, which runs through Thoubal and Kakching. It is also connected by road to the district headquarters Chandel, and the Churachandpur town. There is a bridge over the Manipur River at Sugnu, which permits east–west connectivity.

== History ==
In the 1956 Gazette notification, Sugnu and Langching were included among the hill villages of the Tengnoupal Subdivision. This might indicate that there were tribal populations living in these villages at that time.

In the 1961 census, the tribal part of Sugnu was listed as a separate village in the Tengnoupal Subdivision under the name "Sugnu Lamhang", and the main Sugnu town was listed in the Thoubal Subdivision. They had respective populations of 120 and 1,643 people.

The 2011 census, the main Sugnu town (under Nagar Panchayat) in Thoubal district (now Kakching district) had a population of 5,132 people. The tribal portion of Sugnu is listed under four separate villages in Chandel district: Sugnu Zouveng (435), Sugnu Tribal (734), Sugnu Lokhijang (612) and Sugnu Lamhang (608) with a combined population of 2,389.

== Politics ==
Sugnu is part of Outer Manipur (Lok Sabha constituency).

== See also ==
- Chajing Khunou
- Wangoo
- Khongyam
