= Chandel, Manipur =

Town in Manipur, India

Chandel Chamdil
- Town
- Location in Manipur, India Chandel (India)
- Coordinates: 24.3312°N 94.0011°E
- Country: India
- State: Manipur
- District: Chandel

Population (2011)
  - Total: 1,521

Languages
  - Official: Meiteilon (Manipuri)
- Time zone: UTC+5:30 (IST)

Chandel is a town serving as the district headquarters of the Chandel district in Manipur, India. It is in the valley of the Chakpi River, a tributary of the Manipur River.

As of the 2011 Census of India, Chandel had a population of 1,521 spread over 125 households. It comes under Outer Manipur (Lok Sabha constituency).
