= Chakpikarong =

Chakpikarong Duthu Kankhupam
- Town
- Location in Manipur, India Chakpikarong (India)
- Coordinates: 24°19′N 93°59′E
- Country: India
- State: Manipur
- Established: 1781
- Founder: Sumpi Dilthu
- Town: Chandel

Government
  - Type: Democracy
  - Body: Elected officials
  - Rank: 23rd

Population (2011 census)
  - Total: 63,730

Languages
  - Official: Anāl language (Naga)
- Time zone: UTC+5:30 (IST)
- Postal code: 795102
- ISO 3166 code: IN-MN-BI
- Vehicle registration: MN
- Website: chandel.nic.in

Chakpikarong is a town and subdivision of Chandel district of Manipur state in northeastern India. It is at the mouth of the Chakpi River, which joins the Manipur River at this location. The Anaal tribe is the majority in this region. Its history is deeply rooted with the history of the state. The literacy rate have boomed up in the recent years as transportation have developed.

== Description ==
The place is inhabited by Anāl Naga tribe since time immemorial. Tuingan and Chapki river meet here. It is the home of Yangoupokpi-Lokchao Wildlife Sanctuary, which has an area of 185 km^{2} (71.4 mi^{2}).

=== Languages ===
Anaal, a Sino-Tibetan language, is spoken here. A total of 140,000 residents of India speak the language, and more people in Myanmar also speak it.
