= Kakching district =

Kakching district (Meitei: /kək.ciŋ/)
- District of Manipur
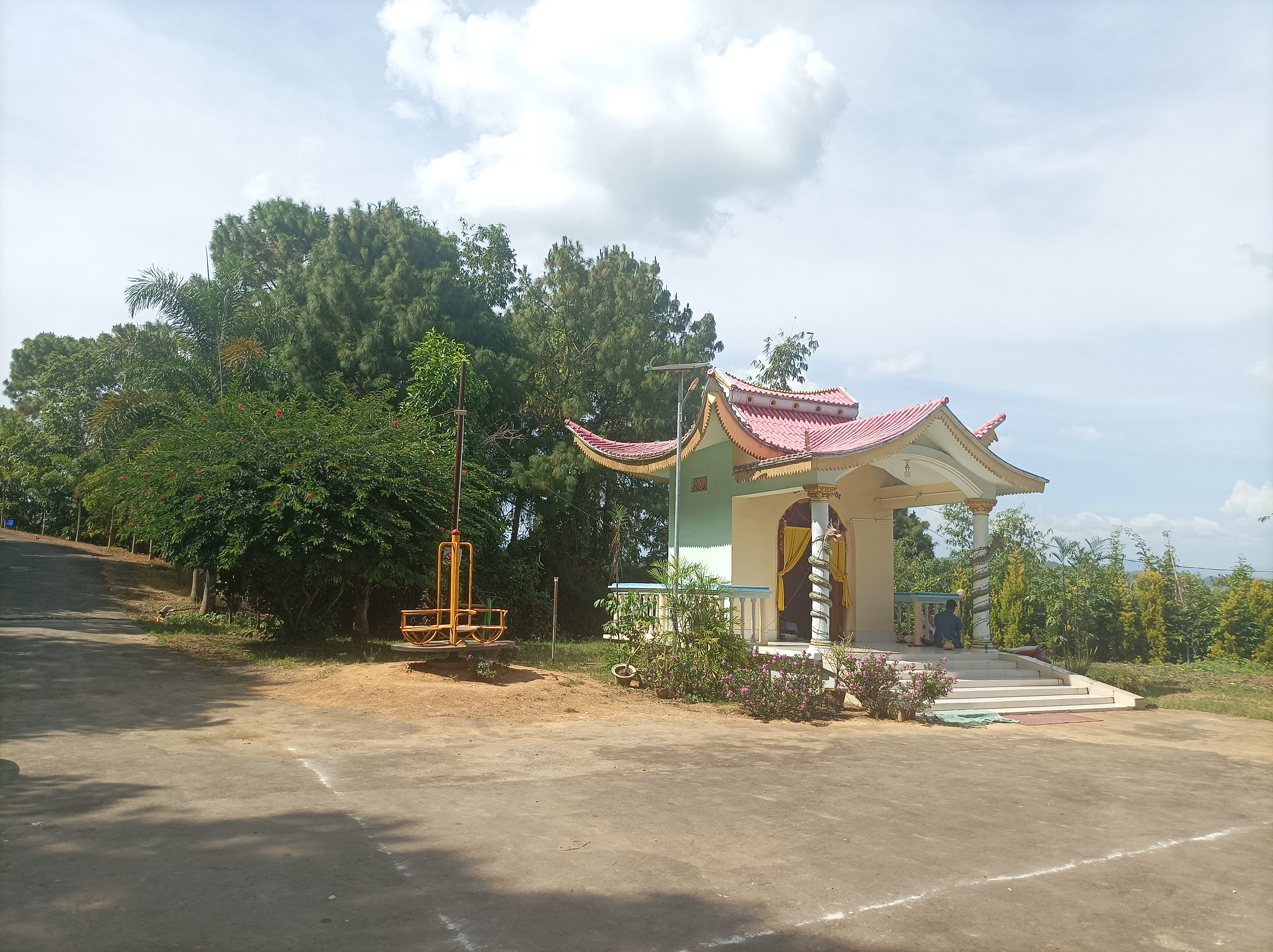
- Pakhangba Temple in Kakching Garden

- Location in Manipur
- Coordinates: 24.48°N 93.98°E
- Country: India
- State: Manipur
- Headquarter: Kakching

Area
  - Total: 190 km^{2} (73 sq mi)
  - Rank: 16

Population (2011)
  - Total: 135,481
  - Density: 710/km^{2} (1,800/sq mi)

Language(s)
  - Official: Meitei (officially called Manipuri)
  - Regional: Kakching dialect
- Time zone: UTC+5:30 (IST)
- Postal code: 795103
- Vehicle registration: MN04
- Website: kakching.nic.in

Kakching district (Meitei pronunciation:/kək.ciŋ/) is one of the 16 districts of Manipur state in northeastern India. It was formed in 2016 from Thoubal district, prior to which it was a subdivision of the latter. The Kakching district is bounded by Thoubal district on the north, Ukhrul and Chandel districts on the east, Churchandpur and Bishnupur districts on the south and Imphal West and Imphal East districts on the west. The district headquarters is Kakching.

Kakching dialect of Meitei language is spoken in this region, and it shares many grammatical features with Standard Manipuri. (Note: also known as Standard Meitei or Standard Meiteilon, in different sources; it is based on the dialect spoken in Imphal.)

== History ==
On 8 December 2016, this district came into existence when all its administrative units of the erstwhile Kakching sub-division were transferred to form a new district. Later, Kakching District was divided into two sub-divisions namely, Kakching and Waikhong.

== Demographics ==
Religions in Kakching district (2011)
Religion	Percent
Hinduism	74.44%
Sanamahi	15.87%
Islam	7.53%
Christianity	1.75%
Other or not stated	0.32%

At the time of the 2011 census, Kakching district had a population of 135,481. Kakching had a sex ratio of 1003 females per 1000 males. 35.91% of the population lived in urban areas. Scheduled Castes and Scheduled Tribes made up 29.05% and 0.85% of the population respectively.

=== Languages ===
Languages in Kakching district (2011)
1. Manipuri (96.6%)
2. Nepali (1.17%)
3. Others (2.26%)

At the time of the 2011 census, 96.57% of the population spoke Manipuri and 1.17% Nepali as their first language.

== Rivers and lakes ==
The Sekmai river is the most significant river flow in the district.

== Tourism ==
Kakching Garden is situated at Uyok Ching, in the south of Kakching Bazaar. It is one of the most highly rated gardens in Manipur.

A fishery farm is located in the northern hills of Kakching near the Kakching Lamkhai.

== Administrative divisions ==
The district is divided into two sub-divisions:

- Kakching
- Waikhong

The four Vidhan Sabha constituencies located within the undivided district are Kakching, Hiyanglam, Sugnu and Wabagai.

Kakching is a municipal town and Waikhong, Hiyanglam, and Sugnu are other small towns in the district.

Th.Kirankumar IAS is the first DC of Kakching district appointed by the Government of Manipur on 8 December 2016 and S.Goutam Singh, IPS is the first Superintendent of Police of Kakching district.

== See also ==
- List of populated places in Kakching district
