= List of populated places in Churachandpur district =

Villages in Churachandpur district of Manipur, India

The Churachandpur district of Manipur state in India is divided into 10 subdivisions or blocks. This is a list of villages in present-day Churachandpur district as per the 2011 Census of India. In 2016, the Pherzawl district was carved out from the Churachandpur district, by separating Thanlon, Tipaimukh, and Vangai blocks.

== Blocks ==
As of 2022, the district has 10 administrative sub-divisions or blocks: Churachandpur (Lamka block), Tuibuong, Kangvai, Saikot, Sangaikot, Singhat, Henglep, Mualnuam, Samulamlan, and Suangdoh. The Thanlon, Tipaimukh, and Vangai blocks were once part of the Churachandpur district, but now come under the Pherzawl district formed in 2016.

At the time of the 2011 census, the present-day Churachandpur district had the following subdivisions:

Name	Population	Effective literacy rate	Sex ratio	SC population %	ST population %	Census code (2011)
Churachandpur North	30616	73.9%	942	0.03%	95.52%	01870
Churachandpur	174138	86.06%	989	0.23%	91.33%	01871
Singngat	22130	73.32%	906	0.08%	95.5%	01872

== Towns ==
The district has three towns.

Name	Type	Block	Population	Effective literacy rate	Sex ratio	SC population %	ST population %	Census code (2011)
Zenhang Lamka	Census Town	Churachandpur	7771	83.12%	1064	0.21%	66.89%	269800
Rengkai	Census Town	Churachandpur	8293	93.29%	934	0.02%	88.8%	269801
Hill Town	Census Town	Churachandpur	2293	90.66%	1068	0.04%	65.72%	269802

== Villages ==
=== Other ===
The following villages were part of the former Thanlon block, most of which is now part of the Pherzawl district formed in 2016.

Name	Population	Effective literacy rate	Sex ratio	SC population %	ST population %	Census code (2011)
Maite	278	87.66%	917	0%	99.64%	269331
Mualhoihchiang	108	80.95%	1160	0%	100.0%	269332
Phaipheng	589	46.54%	977	0%	100.0%	269333
L. Phungchongjang	243	42.65%	898	0%	99.59%	269334
Bualtang	130	78.26%	857	0%	99.23%	269335
Tuiku Muallum	115	89.22%	855	0%	100.0%	269336
Sainoujang	423	35.44%	847	0%	98.58%	269337
Tuilijang	204	94.41%	1020	0%	99.51%	269338
Phailiangbung	416	82.46%	908	0%	99.76%	269339
Pamjal	359	60.19%	860	0%	99.72%	269340
Thiekbung	131	65.45%	1183	0%	100.0%	269341
Sinjang	114	15.62%	1000	0%	100.0%	269342
B.Munpi	110	33.33%	1000	0%	100.0%	269343
Mualkui	191	58.96%	891	0%	100.0%	269344
Kaihlam	207	50.0%	1050	0%	98.07%	269345
Mong-On	203	33.92%	1051	0%	100.0%	269346
Umtal	200	94.97%	1198	0%	99.5%	269347
Mualnuam	1400	82.1%	961	0%	99.36%	269348
Thuangtam	225	92.31%	1250	0%	99.56%	269349
Songtal	894	83.0%	952	0%	99.44%	269350
Khuanggin	230	74.87%	1054	0%	100.0%	269351
Khajang	373	99.68%	984	0%	100.0%	269352
Sinjawl	1199	88.15%	931	0%	99.5%	269353

=== Churachandpur North block ===
Name	Population	Effective literacy rate	Sex ratio	SC population %	ST population %	Census code (2011)
Chongchin	394	80.52%	1010	0%	96.95%	269354
Phaibatang	171	91.02%	819	0%	98.25%	269355
Saihum	119	96.23%	803	0%	99.16%	269356
Konpi	157	95.68%	915	0%	98.09%	269357
Santing	507	99.76%	871	0%	96.06%	269358
Santing (L)	431	78.57%	724	0%	97.45%	269359
Maomual	195	80.33%	840	0%	99.49%	269360
Saichang	227	87.78%	908	0%	99.56%	269361
Molkhang	101	93.07%	980	0%	100.0%	269362
Sainoulien	110	31.96%	964	0%	100.0%	269363
Lailong(L)	138	99.08%	1156	0%	99.28%	269364
Lailong (S)	226	79.62%	780	0%	99.56%	269365
Phaisat	153	23.26%	1068	0%	99.35%	269366
Nungsai	308	96.15%	1184	0%	99.35%	269367
Aina	251	53.14%	887	0%	100.0%	269368
Sanglel	135	68.5%	800	0%	100.0%	269369
Naopanglon	147	84.21%	1042	0%	100.0%	269370
Phaibong	112	64.81%	1667	0%	88.39%	269371
Vantungbung	164	91.28%	1025	0%	100.0%	269372
Songkong	202	78.95%	980	0%	100.0%	269373
Mamong	299	70.42%	1062	0%	100.0%	269374
Chingmei Kuki	378	85.39%	989	0%	99.74%	269375
Khanpi	453	97.16%	1022	0%	98.23%	269376
Ainujang	95	8.97%	1111	0%	100.0%	269377
Mollen	277	66.81%	910	0%	100.0%	269378
Songphu	244	75.0%	891	0%	99.18%	269379
Bolkot	223	64.43%	956	0%	99.55%	269380
K.Hengcham	149	59.52%	1069	0%	100.0%	269381
Kolchung	161	90.98%	988	0%	100.0%	269382
Majuron Kuki	335	37.72%	893	0%	0%	269383
L.Thingphai	189	23.81%	871	0%	67.2%	269384
Tumjangphai	111	77.5%	982	0%	99.1%	269385
L. Phaikholum	125	51.33%	894	0%	98.4%	269386
L. Phailen	142	47.86%	1328	0%	100.0%	269387
K.Thenjang	58	95.0%	1000	0%	100.0%	269388
L. Khengjang	370	58.23%	888	0%	90.81%	269389
Phoipi	152	92.24%	877	0%	99.34%	269390
Thangsi	120	96.94%	875	0%	100.0%	269391
Silen	519	73.98%	937	0%	93.45%	269392
L.Boljol	178	71.63%	1000	0%	98.88%	269393
Hengmol	145	66.91%	859	0%	100.0%	269394
Bongphajol	169	82.39%	1036	0%	95.86%	269395
Kukimun	508	41.75%	1057	1.57%	84.25%	269396
L.Gamnomphai	72	64.18%	1118	0%	100.0%	269397
Lamdan Kuki	148	57.58%	1145	0%	95.95%	269398
Gamnomphai	56	52.17%	867	0%	100.0%	269399
Changlei	0	NA	NA	NA	NA	269400
Ingourok	104	45.98%	677	0%	99.04%	269401
K.Lhangnom	120	65.66%	1000	0%	100.0%	269402
K.Songjang	104	98.84%	763	0%	100.0%	269403
Kungpinaosen	281	34.7%	979	0%	94.66%	269404
New Kungpi	369	63.45%	1061	0%	87.8%	269405
Lamdan Kabui	371	81.13%	973	0%	98.92%	269406
Tokpa Kabui	333	76.25%	1379	0%	99.1%	269407
Kokodan Dahlon	116	83.81%	1189	0%	93.97%	269408
Kokodan Khullen	143	76.56%	959	0%	96.5%	269409
Majuron Kabui	476	82.44%	975	0%	86.97%	269410
Sadu Khoiroi	581	69.57%	1017	0%	99.66%	269411
Charoi Khullen	803	93.91%	898	0%	99.38%	269412
Nahlon	442	79.03%	1056	0%	99.1%	269413
Ningthiching	332	78.0%	668	0%	82.83%	269414
N.Ningthiching	396	73.27%	664	0%	88.13%	269415
N.Chingphei	84	92.96%	1049	0%	88.1%	269416
Hengkapkot	113	68.29%	1018	0%	100.0%	269417
Golenkot	193	20.36%	1053	0%	100.0%	269418
Zounoi	174	11.68%	1231	0%	100.0%	269419
Phaipijang	68	62.07%	1345	0%	100.0%	269420
Ukha Loikhai	418	97.28%	917	0%	99.76%	269421
Gouthang	238	76.44%	817	0%	100.0%	269422
Najang	378	77.16%	1043	0%	100.0%	269423
Selvung (Napphou)	228	79.58%	839	0%	100.0%	269424
Kamkeilon	319	91.67%	957	0%	99.69%	269425
Henglep	992	94.58%	968	0%	94.56%	269426
N. Saikot	139	78.57%	958	0%	100.0%	269427
Dahtum	69	74.63%	971	0%	100.0%	269428
Thinghejang	168	24.32%	1074	0%	98.81%	269429
L.Khaopijang	237	75.43%	959	0%	100.0%	269430
Chothe Munpi	297	96.06%	1062	0%	78.11%	269431
Loilamkot	138	98.45%	816	0%	91.3%	269432
Mollungthu	44	79.55%	1316	0%	100.0%	269433
Leisanbung	203	64.32%	915	0%	94.09%	269434
Molphei Tampak	356	70.17%	864	0%	99.16%	269435
Tonglhang	150	53.08%	974	0%	100.0%	269436
S.Nabil	1337	47.59%	1038	0%	98.88%	269437
Teijang	459	87.97%	987	0%	100.0%	269438
Mongken	345	91.86%	983	0%	99.71%	269439
Zongmakot	103	7.53%	776	0%	100.0%	269440
Nabil Khuman	309	50.6%	931	0%	100.0%	269441
Moljen	130	91.53%	1097	0%	98.46%	269442
Songpha	235	90.67%	975	0%	100.0%	269443
D. Munlui	161	79.03%	769	0%	97.52%	269444
Kolhen	436	96.57%	938	0%	100.0%	269445
Dohjang	129	96.77%	985	0%	98.45%	269446
Bungkot	179	56.74%	946	0%	97.21%	269447
B.Mongjang	156	90.91%	773	0%	99.36%	269448
Songkot	90	91.43%	1093	0%	100.0%	269449
Monglham	200	55.93%	724	0%	99.0%	269450
Tongkhojou	116	59.62%	871	0%	100.0%	269451
M.Phaijang	115	48.04%	1170	0%	100.0%	269452
Humkot	154	95.31%	1081	0%	96.1%	269453
Lhanjang	499	49.5%	897	0%	98.8%	269454
Damjawl	97	98.63%	764	0%	100.0%	269455
Moldak	257	95.35%	1295	0%	99.61%	269456
K.Tuiliphai	154	99.23%	1053	0%	100.0%	269457
Lungchong	191	89.94%	1146	0%	98.43%	269458
V.Munlai	238	90.58%	1034	0%	100.0%	269459
Munpi	521	81.86%	1035	0%	99.81%	269460
Chongkhojou	616	89.14%	730	0%	87.01%	269461
Thingken	444	83.98%	574	0.23%	81.98%	269462
Tuilumjang	362	16.46%	957	0%	99.45%	269463
P.Sejol	334	80.52%	575	0%	75.15%	269464
Hengkom	95	96.77%	696	0%	100.0%	269465
N.Pansang	101	84.29%	980	0%	100.0%	269466
Phiran	154	66.93%	1053	0%	100.0%	269467
P. Molcham	82	30.16%	1158	0%	98.78%	269468
Vungbuk	415	63.13%	861	0%	98.07%	269469
Tuilaphai	560	90.38%	1044	0%	99.82%	269470
T.Gangpijang	135	32.69%	1077	0%	98.52%	269471
Singmun	332	98.92%	785	0%	100.0%	269472
Pakol	80	49.18%	667	0%	98.75%	269473
D.Loupum	203	50.0%	971	0%	99.01%	269474
Phaihel	144	93.86%	1057	0%	100.0%	269475
Molcham	47	89.19%	958	0%	100.0%	269476

=== Churachandpur block ===
Name	Population	Effective literacy rate	Sex ratio	SC population %	ST population %	Census code (2011)
Ngarian	782	84.7%	1069	0%	99.23%	269477
Zaingang Khuman	82	78.57%	1000	0%	100.0%	269478
Chaiba	294	84.9%	1178	0%	100.0%	269479
Varok	79	76.27%	756	0%	100.0%	269480
Dimdunlung	59	84.91%	1185	0%	100.0%	269481
Thengjang	369	67.38%	973	0%	98.92%	269482
Chehjang	68	75.0%	943	0%	98.53%	269483
Louchulbung	122	80.0%	1033	0%	99.18%	269484
Aimol	328	85.76%	1116	0%	99.09%	269485
Keirap Khunthak	615	89.6%	538	0%	61.3%	269486
Keirap Khunkha	685	77.27%	730	5.69%	52.7%	269487
Laimanai Kabui	208	59.22%	981	0%	100.0%	269488
K.Geljang	189	96.41%	340	0%	56.08%	269489
Thumkhonglok	44	34.21%	1000	0%	100.0%	269490
Laimanai Kuki	304	99.67%	31	0.33%	2.63%	269491
Pangjang	98	82.22%	922	0%	100.0%	269492
L.Semol	73	86.54%	921	0%	100.0%	269493
Keirap Khullen	220	82.78%	507	0%	77.27%	269494
Langjingmanbi	43	82.05%	955	0%	100.0%	269495
Heichanglok	50	94.87%	852	0%	100.0%	269496
Khoirentak Khuman	483	88.99%	1004	0%	96.89%	269497
Khoirentak Khunou	390	95.07%	718	0%	81.28%	269498
Khousabung	564	96.93%	1036	0%	99.47%	269499
Bunglon	319	73.31%	1045	0%	100.0%	269500
Kangathei	240	89.81%	1034	0%	100.0%	269501
Hermontang	153	92.65%	937	0%	99.35%	269502
Senpangjang	164	89.26%	1130	0%	98.17%	269503
Pungchongjang	305	86.77%	713	0%	83.93%	269504
Ujungmakhong	152	92.65%	1171	0%	100.0%	269505
P.Gelmolkhunou	108	90.91%	800	0%	99.07%	269506
Bijang Tampak	70	75.86%	628	0%	100.0%	269507
Laikamolsau	37	81.82%	1643	0%	86.49%	269508
Mualsang	65	62.75%	1241	0%	100.0%	269509
Mualngat	138	92.37%	533	2.9%	65.94%	269510
Bijang Gangte	37	75.86%	762	0%	100.0%	269511
Thoroilok	55	77.08%	1500	0%	96.36%	269512
P.Geljang	90	70.13%	1045	0%	98.89%	269513
Phoisanbung	115	94.95%	825	0%	97.39%	269514
Pholjang	253	92.37%	524	0%	72.73%	269515
Ukhatampak	264	85.84%	846	0%	69.7%	269516
Songdo	171	84.29%	1060	0%	98.25%	269517
Phoisenphai	156	93.38%	1000	0%	100.0%	269518
Gothol	589	91.92%	554	0%	68.93%	269519
G. Mongjang	141	65.32%	1238	0%	99.29%	269520
Kangvai	939	87.32%	1024	0%	90.84%	269521
K. Khomunnom	171	98.59%	943	0%	100.0%	269522
K.Kotlian	145	87.3%	859	0%	97.93%	269523
Mualhoih	131	71.17%	985	0%	96.95%	269524
New Zalenphai	275	85.14%	937	0%	97.09%	269525
Torbung	439	96.53%	1206	0%	99.54%	269526
Matijang	646	94.73%	746	0%	90.87%	269527
Maichammun	290	90.22%	1132	0%	98.28%	269528
B. Kholmun	17	66.67%	1125	0%	100.0%	269529
Kangoi Paolian	291	96.48%	940	0%	99.66%	269530
Pengjang	422	90.98%	963	0%	100.0%	269531
T.Thingjang	112	32.69%	1154	0%	99.11%	269532
V. Kolmun	106	43.56%	797	0%	98.11%	269533
Torbung Loklaiphai	197	84.62%	1402	0%	96.95%	269534
S.Kotlian	411	98.09%	1035	0%	99.03%	269535
S.Bualjang	312	87.02%	1066	0%	99.68%	269536
Jikpi Tampak	119	66.67%	1088	0%	100.0%	269537
Kaprang	527	94.6%	996	0%	99.24%	269538
Leisang	224	97.06%	1286	0%	97.32%	269539
Monglianphai	720	90.53%	1006	0%	98.06%	269540
Tollen	551	97.36%	874	0%	99.09%	269541
Zolzam	501	75.58%	1028	0%	99.6%	269542
Yangnomphai	121	92.23%	1086	0%	100.0%	269543
Vajing	277	88.89%	979	0%	79.78%	269544
Boljol	608	54.84%	1068	0%	99.67%	269545
Zaolen	360	64.0%	967	0%	92.5%	269546
Zanglenphai	204	62.5%	1147	0%	98.53%	269547
Khengjang	766	97.56%	901	0%	97.13%	269548
Lairik Vaison	424	71.14%	1038	0%	99.53%	269549
Gamnom	206	63.35%	981	0%	90.29%	269550
Gangpichai	255	71.76%	1056	0%	100.0%	269551
Khochijang	332	23.16%	1088	0%	99.7%	269552
Hengjang	92	97.44%	1359	0%	97.83%	269553
Teiseng	1375	80.71%	984	0%	97.67%	269554
T. Bollen	73	48.33%	921	0%	100.0%	269555
Khaopijang	68	94.92%	1125	0%	97.06%	269556
Kholmun	616	94.03%	1081	0%	99.68%	269557
Mongjang Tampak	223	70.65%	1009	0%	95.96%	269558
T.Champhai	441	94.69%	1061	0%	99.55%	269559
Kumbi Pukhri	575	99.37%	969	0%	91.83%	269560
Lajangphai	505	73.61%	1045	0%	97.03%	269561
K.Salbung (Srs)	764	91.76%	1054	0%	95.68%	269562
Bethel	752	92.13%	1180	0%	99.07%	269563
M. Ramthar	657	93.94%	1086	0%	98.78%	269564
Molnom	1466	92.87%	1112	0%	99.39%	269565
Khomoi (Srs)	605	93.07%	1101	0%	93.88%	269566
Tuibong	8085	92.06%	880	0.2%	84.22%	269567
Hmarveng	1127	95.61%	1103	0%	92.37%	269568
Bijang	5020	70.53%	1058	0%	93.25%	269569
Sielmat	1349	96.75%	1124	0%	96.37%	269570
Zomicolony	1145	95.56%	1116	0%	99.74%	269571
Hiangzo	369	90.34%	1073	0%	89.7%	269572
New Zoveng	298	54.79%	1144	0%	99.66%	269573
Zoumunnuam	270	86.58%	957	0%	99.26%	269574
Hiangtam Lamka	4830	92.72%	1079	0%	82.92%	269575
S. Monglenjang	144	66.07%	1118	0%	100.0%	269576
Salem Veng	1309	96.68%	1219	0%	96.49%	269577
Chengkonpang	2795	81.14%	1045	0.68%	91.91%	269578
Ccpur H.Q.	2050	90.52%	1069	0%	98.63%	269579
D.Phailian	3903	90.18%	1040	2.28%	88.24%	269580
Bungmual	4441	93.53%	1049	0%	99.53%	269581
Hmuia Veng	1052	97.3%	1067	0%	98.38%	269582
Vengnuam	7302	93.32%	1047	0%	99.12%	269583
College Veng	3254	89.42%	1048	0%	99.69%	269584
Dorcas Veng	3590	76.42%	1026	0%	99.19%	269585
Gouchinkhup Veng	3009	89.92%	1037	0%	97.87%	269586
Elim Veng	897	85.59%	1048	0%	99.78%	269587
Lailam Veng	782	95.2%	980	0%	99.23%	269588
Sim Veng	1391	94.52%	1092	0%	58.38%	269589
Hebron Veng	1746	96.1%	1086	0%	99.14%	269590
S. Haijang	463	85.68%	913	0%	99.78%	269591
D.M.Veng	593	86.67%	1031	0%	99.16%	269592
Tonglal	178	67.91%	1119	0%	100.0%	269593
Seilal Veng	214	91.49%	963	0%	99.07%	269594
L.Semol	445	91.95%	1014	0%	100.0%	269595
M.Songgel	1135	83.71%	1170	0%	98.5%	269596
Kingkin	333	97.17%	881	0%	100.0%	269597
Leijangkhopi	396	85.71%	922	0%	100.0%	269598
S.Molcham	712	90.22%	945	0%	99.58%	269599
Lhangnom	310	86.72%	1153	0%	98.39%	269600
Kotsohoi	226	92.43%	1132	0%	99.56%	269601
Lhangjol	804	85.06%	1062	0%	99.88%	269602
Tuinom Khopi	500	86.54%	894	0%	99.6%	269603
Gelmon Khuman	465	66.3%	987	0%	89.46%	269604
S.Khaomunnom	0	NA	NA	NA	NA	269605
Thinghangjang	160	25.56%	1051	0%	100.0%	269606
T.Jouzang	125	32.97%	786	0%	95.2%	269607
Tolphei	202	94.74%	980	0%	100.0%	269608
Mata Lambulane	316	96.65%	1150	0%	100.0%	269609
Pearson	1986	94.54%	1043	0%	97.53%	269610
Telsing Bazar	69	74.55%	971	0%	100.0%	269611
Songpi	554	69.45%	897	0%	89.35%	269612
Mission Compound(Ccp)	166	73.91%	1075	0%	98.8%	269613
Molhoi (S)	42	69.44%	1333	0%	95.24%	269614
N. Molhoi	275	78.85%	1115	0%	97.82%	269615
Songpi Kholui	273	82.86%	1184	0%	95.24%	269616
Hengkot	474	91.32%	1000	0%	99.79%	269617
Khotuh	216	87.94%	376	0%	63.89%	269618
T.Lhangnom	110	90.2%	897	0%	100.0%	269619
Sabual	210	76.07%	944	0%	97.14%	269620
T.Boljang	407	88.77%	966	0%	99.51%	269621
Takvom	80	98.68%	739	0%	86.25%	269622
Lenglakot	19	18.75%	1375	0%	10.53%	269623
Salva Lhanbung	164	50.0%	1130	0%	98.17%	269624
Haopi	75	8.82%	744	0%	100.0%	269625
Lamzang	322	82.5%	952	0%	99.69%	269626
Phaibem	195	89.74%	1053	0%	90.77%	269627
Ngoiphai	308	87.45%	1216	0%	99.35%	269628
Zoumun	66	89.66%	941	0%	96.97%	269629
Gelzang	287	82.66%	1110	0%	95.82%	269630
Matamualtam	474	89.74%	1043	0%	97.68%	269631
Buallian	281	77.95%	951	0%	88.97%	269632
Mata	2273	88.65%	677	0%	74.04%	269633
Ngaloimol	76	89.23%	1171	0%	93.42%	269634
Bishanmual	64	91.07%	1000	0%	98.44%	269635
Phaihel	185	95.24%	729	0%	100.0%	269636
Lingsiphai	1303	93.84%	1002	0.46%	99.16%	269637
Tualnuam	187	93.08%	1055	0%	99.47%	269638
Tangmual	603	87.7%	1116	0%	99.83%	269639
Suongsibok	125	91.09%	1049	0%	97.6%	269640
Thingkangphai	2017	76.57%	1013	7.59%	69.01%	269641
Konpui	625	92.01%	1076	0%	98.56%	269642
Pangjol	419	89.89%	931	0%	96.18%	269643
Tangnuam	929	94.51%	1042	0%	98.92%	269644
Lanva	905	95.28%	1057	0%	99.12%	269645
Gangpimual	2638	88.6%	1066	0.42%	96.78%	269646
Ngathal	932	84.87%	1031	0%	85.19%	269647
Saipum	1977	94.52%	303	0.2%	33.64%	269648
Misao Lhavom	622	78.7%	896	0%	100.0%	269649
Benazou	63	86.21%	658	0%	100.0%	269650
Sehken	305	24.37%	1033	0%	99.34%	269651
Tolyangkuki	77	98.33%	1406	0%	98.7%	269652
Bohlui	114	87.27%	1036	0%	100.0%	269653
M.Semol	197	70.99%	931	0%	100.0%	269654
Sumtuhphai	98	91.95%	885	0%	100.0%	269655
Mualkot	63	100.0%	1100	0%	100.0%	269656
Mualpi	159	92.13%	807	0%	99.37%	269657
Mualsan	181	80.82%	967	0%	97.79%	269658
Tuikham	100	82.61%	1564	0%	100.0%	269659
Khuangnung	118	85.57%	934	0%	98.31%	269660
Ngurte	604	86.59%	1061	0%	98.01%	269661
Tuikham Daizang	271	71.92%	1240	0%	98.52%	269662
Thenmuol	543	84.55%	1088	0%	97.61%	269663
Tuibul	75	30.56%	1083	0%	93.33%	269664
Tuaitengphai	310	75.08%	975	0%	100.0%	269665
Dumsaumual	252	48.19%	1083	0%	99.6%	269666
Mualbem	343	75.92%	971	0.29%	96.21%	269667
Khopuibung	580	87.27%	986	0%	99.31%	269668
G. Tonjang	67	92.31%	861	0%	100.0%	269669
Valpakot	369	63.38%	800	0%	92.41%	269670
Hmuntha Tampak	229	78.1%	1245	0%	100.0%	269671
Saikot	2486	91.0%	1058	0%	96.54%	269672
Mualvaphei	2207	91.94%	1053	0%	99.5%	269673
Tuithapi	324	89.89%	1051	0%	98.77%	269674
Saidan	1363	92.39%	1043	0%	98.17%	269675
Thingchom	354	91.54%	1046	0%	96.05%	269676
S.Mongkot	188	71.97%	1022	0%	0%	269677
Songpeh	220	98.27%	1222	0%	99.09%	269678
Mongnelphai	156	74.44%	1328	0%	1.28%	269679
B.Pangmual	73	47.46%	780	0%	86.3%	269680
G.Khonuam	136	50.89%	889	0%	99.26%	269681
B.Salvaphai	208	64.85%	944	0%	99.04%	269682
Chaljang	45	35.14%	1143	0%	100.0%	269683
G. Monglian	462	47.73%	901	0%	99.35%	269684
Tuitengjang	142	83.04%	797	0%	99.3%	269685
Tuinuphai	279	70.95%	951	0%	97.13%	269686
B.Kaljang	245	80.98%	976	0%	87.76%	269687
S. Moldung	184	79.74%	1091	0%	98.91%	269688
Dumlian (Salem)	194	95.51%	1000	0%	100.0%	269689
T.Bongpijang	106	87.36%	1208	0%	85.85%	269690
P.N.Khovong	43	88.1%	870	0%	95.35%	269691
Tuining	710	81.49%	1070	0%	99.3%	269692
Zomi Zion	56	79.07%	1074	0%	98.21%	269693
Tuiningkhal	191	89.38%	990	0%	99.48%	269694
Lhangnom	201	77.78%	896	0%	100.0%	269695
Moldenphai	31	26.09%	1214	0%	100.0%	269696
K.Jangnomphai	81	60.53%	884	0%	98.77%	269697
Tuitum (J)	101	86.42%	1405	0%	100.0%	269698
Muizol	108	87.78%	770	0%	100.0%	269699
Sangaikot	676	96.04%	1000	0%	95.12%	269700
Matijang	85	98.68%	1024	0%	94.12%	269701
Langvon	79	92.86%	881	0%	100.0%	269702
Mongbung	431	84.36%	1092	0%	97.45%	269703
Tuivelmual	88	50.68%	833	0%	100.0%	269704
T.Khonom	305	37.69%	1020	0%	97.05%	269705
Goupibung	44	79.49%	1095	0%	93.18%	269706
Zobethel	97	75.64%	830	0%	100.0%	269707
L.Gangpimual	174	65.81%	977	0%	100.0%	269708
Molvom (Srs)	223	58.46%	1009	0%	99.55%	269709
Kuwan	68	77.19%	943	0%	100.0%	269710
Lamlai	199	84.71%	895	0%	97.99%	269711
Khengmual	190	94.58%	759	0%	99.47%	269712
Leisen Tampak	198	59.12%	1106	0%	100.0%	269713
Patjang	157	80.56%	962	0%	100.0%	269714
Khodang	308	84.58%	974	0%	99.35%	269715
G.Songgel	400	79.23%	1083	0%	99.75%	269716
Makhao Bungmual	234	92.72%	1071	0%	99.15%	269717
Makhao Mollum	89	81.54%	1282	0%	100.0%	269718
Makhao Tampak	320	94.46%	829	0%	100.0%	269719
M.B.Saichang	246	90.32%	1016	0%	100.0%	269720
Pantha	195	91.02%	1349	0%	99.49%	269721
Makhao (H)	202	59.52%	1149	0%	99.5%	269722
Lunggil	306	54.01%	987	0%	100.0%	269723
Molzol (Moljol)	397	55.02%	1089	0%	97.73%	269724
L.Happyland	0	NA	NA	NA	NA	269725
L. Khonomphai	163	63.43%	918	0%	100.0%	269726
Dongjang	502	78.32%	992	0%	99.4%	269727
Hengken	421	98.17%	914	0%	100.0%	269728
M.Phaimol	158	93.55%	1135	0%	100.0%	269729
Saiboh	179	92.96%	946	0%	95.53%	269730
Suanggual	131	95.19%	1079	0%	100.0%	269731
Khaukual Khuman	145	81.51%	1164	0%	100.0%	269732
Zalenkot	103	83.95%	943	0%	99.03%	269733
Khuangkhaijang	141	70.43%	1014	0%	100.0%	269734
Dutezol	28	68.0%	867	0%	96.43%	269735
Khoinoi	197	80.0%	990	0%	98.48%	269736
Jangmun	157	85.83%	962	0%	100.0%	269737
Teisaljang	388	93.48%	874	0%	99.74%	269738
Walkhu	238	52.08%	1070	0%	99.16%	269739
Singheu	350	79.46%	832	0%	96.86%	269740
Tuisomjang	170	63.16%	977	0%	100.0%	269741
T.Khuangkhai	359	71.15%	941	0%	100.0%	269742
W. Joujang	99	66.29%	1106	0%	100.0%	269743
Phaisan	70	77.61%	1059	0%	100.0%	269744
Hita Khunou	359	86.8%	973	0%	94.71%	269745
Tuidam	162	56.16%	1077	0%	100.0%	269746
Govajang	155	43.7%	1039	0%	100.0%	269747
New Khuakual	127	23.89%	896	0%	90.55%	269748
S.Gelbung	156	63.57%	857	0%	100.0%	269749
Ngairong	183	88.51%	947	0%	98.36%	269750
Moirang Mantak	406	92.9%	1040	0%	99.51%	269751
Saiton Khunou (Seitual)	193	81.07%	1098	0%	100.0%	269752
Saiton Khullen	149	63.08%	886	0%	73.15%	269753
Kulbung	220	83.08%	1178	0%	99.55%	269754
T. Munnomjang	58	82.05%	1522	0%	100.0%	269755
Gotengphai	86	87.34%	1150	0%	98.84%	269756
Dopkon	111	84.69%	1176	0%	100.0%	269757
Khuangmun	167	62.5%	965	0%	100.0%	269758
Siden	158	64.63%	859	0%	100.0%	269759
Changpikot	202	60.69%	942	0%	99.01%	269760
T.Molkot	186	67.55%	824	0%	89.78%	269761
T.Kananphai	205	75.46%	898	0%	96.1%	269762
Lhungjang	98	67.95%	1042	0%	100.0%	269763
Saikul	185	86.63%	907	0%	100.0%	269764
Haotak Keirap	127	90.35%	1082	0%	100.0%	269765
Nomjang (Srs)	93	68.35%	1325	0%	98.92%	269766
S.Gotengjang	148	70.0%	850	0%	100.0%	269767
Khongjanglok	37	63.64%	1056	0%	100.0%	269768
H.Kotlian	29	70.83%	1071	0%	100.0%	269769
M.Kananphai	153	86.29%	987	0%	95.42%	269770
Bungsanglian	79	69.23%	1026	0%	100.0%	269771
Dampi	622	89.0%	950	0%	93.41%	269772
Thampilian	66	91.07%	1000	0%	93.94%	269773
Khonomphai	171	92.62%	943	0%	100.0%	269774
Tuiringphaisen	409	90.56%	985	9.05%	90.46%	269775
Sihjang (Srs)	104	94.44%	926	0%	100.0%	269776
Maojang	33	96.77%	650	0%	100.0%	269777
Lhangnomphai	98	76.83%	1130	0%	100.0%	269778
Pumkot Minzang	46	79.07%	1190	0%	97.83%	269779
Lailampat	129	91.6%	1115	0%	100.0%	269780
Bonglusi	110	45.92%	1075	0%	81.82%	269781
H.Gelbung	240	86.96%	935	0%	92.5%	269782
H.Vajang Khuman	70	98.25%	944	0%	47.14%	269783
Haotak Khullen(Srs)	108	95.83%	929	0%	89.81%	269784
Haotak Phailen	165	60.71%	1143	0%	100.0%	269785
Lukhumbi	259	66.67%	1123	0%	94.98%	269786
Sagang	1198	83.92%	1048	0%	81.47%	269787
Lalambung	227	54.5%	1009	0%	99.56%	269788
Theikakpi	45	97.14%	800	0%	100.0%	269789
Nungthang Tampak	157	81.12%	1275	0%	100.0%	269790
Lamngsei Tampak	106	12.94%	1000	0%	100.0%	269791
Samulamlan	270	55.32%	942	0%	100.0%	269792
Chinglangmei	310	77.37%	1026	0%	98.71%	269793
Molamphai	68	83.64%	619	0%	100.0%	269794
New Bijang	200	41.82%	980	0%	100.0%	269795
New Boljang	171	49.65%	819	0%	96.49%	269796
L. Muncham	119	41.35%	919	0%	99.16%	269797
Vaozang	80	88.89%	778	0%	100.0%	269798
Luihoihmolcham	496	95.56%	930	0%	99.6%	269799

=== Singngat block ===
Name	Population	Effective literacy rate	Sex ratio	SC population %	ST population %	Census code (2011)
Allusingtam	124	90.6%	797	0%	100.0%	269803
P. Suahzahau	216	81.77%	912	0%	100.0%	269804
T.Singtam	75	97.06%	1143	0%	97.33%	269805
Zabellei	163	95.56%	1117	0%	100.0%	269806
Vokbual (M)	99	84.71%	800	0%	100.0%	269807
Vokbual(L)	153	90.83%	866	0%	100.0%	269808
Tonglon (K)	354	86.5%	844	0%	100.0%	269809
Tonglon(D)	155	96.03%	987	0%	100.0%	269810
Tonglon (P)	178	89.29%	1070	0%	99.44%	269811
Tonglon (T)	208	82.01%	926	0%	100.0%	269812
Hiangmual	117	92.23%	918	0%	100.0%	269813
Chahnou	215	75.29%	1009	0%	100.0%	269814
Buksau	192	85.64%	1000	0%	100.0%	269815
Simbuk	106	78.0%	1120	0%	88.68%	269816
Molbungjang	127	95.54%	924	0%	100.0%	269817
New Laizang	240	77.84%	1087	0%	100.0%	269818
Kullian	256	92.34%	1081	0%	98.83%	269819
M. Lunmual	128	82.41%	910	0%	100.0%	269820
Hiangdung	90	90.67%	765	0%	88.89%	269821
Panglian	266	91.98%	900	0%	100.0%	269822
M.Tanglian	289	58.97%	901	0%	100.0%	269823
S.Munhoi	122	78.57%	1140	0%	100.0%	269824
Belbing	123	97.2%	757	0%	95.12%	269825
S.Geltui	320	75.34%	975	0%	100.0%	269826
Zezaw	268	86.55%	1015	0%	98.51%	269827
L. Phaimol	338	97.67%	988	0%	92.6%	269828
Bongbal	319	92.08%	1032	0%	97.81%	269829
Muallum	899	66.32%	901	0%	99.89%	269830
T. Khajang	261	87.78%	740	0%	100.0%	269831
S. Belpuan	105	93.81%	842	0%	100.0%	269832
Sumchinvum	999	63.6%	1014	0%	98.2%	269833
Singngat	3778	85.08%	679	0.13%	81.21%	269834
Zalenphai	150	92.97%	1027	0%	81.33%	269835
Lanchah	138	56.91%	1156	0%	100.0%	269836
Teikot	121	42.31%	1200	0%	100.0%	269837
Suangkuang	213	91.62%	972	0%	100.0%	269838
Saichang	151	96.0%	1097	0%	100.0%	269839
Mongjang	87	20.99%	977	0%	98.85%	269840
Sialnah	127	68.81%	1309	0%	93.7%	269841
Hiangtam (K)	167	97.1%	1037	0%	99.4%	269842
Theigotang	21	100.0%	1625	0%	100.0%	269843
Tangpijol	502	80.96%	969	0%	93.03%	269844
Likhai	140	39.26%	892	0%	97.86%	269845
Hiangtam (V)	465	64.03%	1039	0%	97.63%	269846
Behjang (V)	1019	59.65%	975	0%	98.53%	269847
Behiang (T)	202	82.93%	804	0%	100.0%	269848
Tonjang	590	26.52%	1007	0%	99.49%	269849
S. Sehken	108	23.33%	964	0.93%	96.3%	269850
Suangphu	306	69.23%	843	0%	99.35%	269851
Hangsum	51	86.49%	594	0%	100.0%	269852
Ngaljang	295	40.34%	879	2.37%	95.59%	269853
Lungchin	633	72.28%	1089	0.63%	94.79%	269854
Tuikuimuallum	501	16.28%	942	0%	97.41%	269855
Suangdoh	1402	67.66%	983	0%	99.86%	269856
Enpum	198	72.22%	941	0%	100.0%	269857
Lungthul (T)	245	75.0%	944	0%	100.0%	269858
Lungthul (L)	823	61.24%	969	0%	99.39%	269859
Lungthul (E)	138	86.82%	1000	0%	100.0%	269860
Kangkap	1044	81.27%	951	0%	99.9%	269861
Sialbu	223	58.01%	1027	0%	98.65%	269862
Chiangpi	222	88.37%	850	0%	99.1%	269863
Changlei	0	NA	NA	NA	NA	269864
Mongken	193	74.85%	892	0%	98.45%	269865
Maokot	251	49.3%	685	0%	95.62%	269866
Hengjang	121	75.49%	984	0%	100.0%	269867
