= Torbung Bangla =

Village in Manipur, India

Torbung Bangla Boljang
- Interactive map of Torbung Bangla
- Location in Manipur, India Torbung Bangla (India)
- Coordinates: 24.4164°N 93.7137°E
- Country: India
- State: Manipur
- District: Churachandpur, Bishnupur

Language(s)
  - Official: Meitei (Manipuri)
- Time zone: UTC+5:30 (IST)

Torbung Bangla (or Bangla) is a village in the geographical precincts of Churachandpur district in Manipur, India. It is populated mostly by Meitei people who regard themselves as being part of Bishnupur district. The village was originally called Boljang, (Note: Kukis' preferred spelling is Bualjang. It is also sometimes written as S. Bualjang, presumably to distinguish it from other villages with the same name.) with an educational sericulture farm established here. At present, the village is a site of contestation between the majority Kuki-Zo people of the Churachandpur district and the Meitei people that dominate the state of Manipur. During the 2023–2024 Manipur violence, the village was almost entirely burnt down by Kuki mobs.

== Geography ==
The (Torbung) Bangla village, originally called Boljang, is on the Tedim Road between Torbung and Churachandpur, in the Khuga River valley (also called "Lamka plain"). To its south is the village of Kaprang, a census village. Snuggled between the two is another small village called Waikhurok. Waikhurok and Bangla are populated by Meitei people, whereas Kaprang is populated by Kuki-Zo people. (Note: The 2011 census shows Kaprang's population being made up of 99 percent Scheduled Tribes.) More recently, a new Kuki-Zo settlement called Haolai Khopi has been founded around the year 2020, immediately to the south of the sericulture farm at the Boljang/Bangla village.

These villages are watered by streams diverted from the Loklai river as soon as it enters the plains, from near the Pengjang village.

== History ==
The village is marked as "Boljang" in the Survey of India data, indicating its original name. It was listed as "Bolzang" among the list of villages in Churachandpur Subvidision in 1956, along with the village "Kapprang". These villages likely date back to the times before Indian independence. In 1959–1960, Boljang was noted to have a private lower primary school, one of 149 such schools in the tribal areas recognised by the Government of Manipur. In 1964–1965, an experimental sericulture farm was established in the village by the Government of Manipur to popularise non-Mulberry silkworm rearing. In 1969, oak tasar silk was introduced by the Central Tasar Research & Training Institute of Ranchi. The sericulture farm still exists, and it is still mentioned as being in the Boljang village.

From 2000 onwards, the village of Boljang began to be overtaken by the newer village of Torbung Bangla. (The actual name of the village is "Bangla". The prefix "Torbung" indicates that it has associated itself with the Torbung gram panchayat.) In 2005, a resident of the village submitted testimony to the AFSPA review committee. In 2009, a driver from the village was abducted by armed miscreants, and the villagers claimed that the abductors were security forces themselves. In 2013, a bomb placed in a roadside culvert killed a security personnel of Gorkha Rifles and injured two others. The security forces suspected the hand of the People's Liberation Army of Manipur (PLA), a Meitei insurgent group, whose members were believed to be taking shelter in the village. Another bomb blast occurred in January 2015 near the 27 Sector Assam Rifles camp. The bomb blast, for which PLA claimed credit, was said to have been part of the "bycott" against the celebration of India's Republic Day. In May 2016, another IED was discovered near a post of the Border Security Force (BSF), which was safely detonated by the bomb disposal squad.

=== Hills–Valley divide ===
Scholar Rohlua Puia notes that the hills–valley distinction in Manipur is political rather than geographical. The hill districts and the valley areas have different administrative systems. The Kuki-majority areas in particular have villages headed by chiefs, as per their traditional custom. The land of the village is owned by the chief and the residents pay only house tax. In contrast, the valley areas have private land-ownership and the owners pay land revenue. A village like Torbung Bangla, where the valley population resides in a hill district (Churachandpur) produces an anomaly. The villagers of Torbung Bangla, despite living in the geographical precincts of a hill district, desire to be treated as belonging to a valley district (Bishnupur). Their land revenue records are maintained in the valley district, while the remainder of administration lies in the hill district.

However, at least since 2012, the Torbung Bangla and Waikhurok villages voted for the gram panchayat (village council) of Torbung. There may be an effort to enlarge the boundaries of the valley district to encompass such villages, noticed by the Registrar General of India and the National Commission for Scheduled Tribes. These efforts caused resentment among the hill populations.

=== 2023–2025 Manipur violence ===
On 3 May 2023, serious ethnic violence broke out between the Meitei and Kuki-Zo people, in which Torbung Bangla was a key location. On that day, a protest march was held in the Churachandpur town to protest the Meitei demand for a Scheduled Tribe status. (Note: This was part of a state-wide protest in all the hill districts organised under the banner of All-Tribal Students Union of Manipur (ATSUM).) Meitei groups organised a counter-agitation in the neighbouring areas of Bishnupur district against the protest march. The Kangvai village (a Kuki village to the north of Torbung) appears to have been attacked and houses ransacked, causing the death of two people. At the same time a fire was started at the base of the Anglo-Kuki War Memorial Gate in the Leisang village (to the south of Bangla and Kaprang). The people that started the fire were described as "unknown miscreants travelling in a white Bolero [van]", who fled the scene after being discovered. Kuki mobs from Churachandpur rushed to the border areas. As the Kuki fighters passed through Torbung Bangla around 3:30 pm, some with advanced weapons, a video of them got circulated on social media, which caused considerable alarm among the Meitei community.

The two sides clashed at the Torbung and Kangvai villages, injuring 30 people. Properties and vehicles are said to have been torched. Apparently after the police dispersed the mobs from these villages, the Kuki mobs returned to Bangla and burnt down almost the entire village. The residents had fled the village when the mobs arrived. According to a resident, the mobsters had complained about a sign board marking the village as being part of the Bishnupur district.

Three months later in August, the Indigenous Tribal Leaders Forum (ITLF), an umbrella body of Kuki leaders, proposed to bury the bodies of 35 Kuki people killed in the violence (Note: These were the bodies of the victims of violence accumulated in the Churachandpur District Hospital. Most of them were killed in or around the Churachandpur district. They do not include the victims of violence in the Imphal Valley.) near the sericulture farm at "S. Boljang" village. (The original announcement mentioned Haolai Khopi.). The proposal brought up strenuous objections from the Meitei community who got organised under the Torbung gram panchayat, calling it a "violation of international law". The International Meitei Forum filed a petition in Manipur High Court, which directed that status quo be maintained till the matter is decided. The Deputy Commissioner of the district said that the site was on land belonging to the Sericulture Department, while the Superintendent of Police noted that it was close to the boundary between Churachandpur and Bishnupur districts, which was a "buffer zone". After appeals from the Union home ministry and the Mizoram chief minister Zoramthanga, ITLF postponed the burial ceremony, and eventually accepted alternative sites. ITLF mentioned to The Hindu that the reason for its insistence on the original site was to assert that it was part of the Churachandpur district, and not Bishnupur district as some Meitei residents claimed.

== See also ==
- List of populated places in Churachandpur district

== Bibliography ==
- Puia, Roluah (2021), "When boundaries matter: land, laws and territorial conflict in Manipur, Northeast India", in Kedilezo Kikhi; Dharma Rakshit Gautam (eds.), Comprehending Equity, Taylor & Francis, pp. 98–, doi:10.4324/9781003182726-8, ISBN 9781003182726 – via academia.edu
