= Muallum =

Coordinates: 24.189°N 93.625°E

Muallum is a Zou village within Singngat Sub-Division, Churachandpur district of Manipur, India. It is located along the Tedim Road that connects the Indian city of Imphal with the Burmese town of Tedim. The word Muollum is a Zou word meaning round-shaped mountains found around the village. With the re-induction of the ADC in the Hill Districts of Manipur, it has become an ADC Constituency.
