= Torbung =

- Interactive map of Torbung
- Location in Manipur, India Torbung (India)
- Coordinates: 24°25′41″N 93°42′57″E
- Country: India
- State: Manipur
- District: Bishnupur, Churachandpur

Area (Note: area in Bishnupur district)
  - Total: 12.57 km^{2} (4.85 sq mi)

Population (2011)
  - Total: 5,139 (2,781 in Bishnupur) (2,358 in Churachandpur)

Language(s)
  - Official: Meitei (Manipuri)
- Time zone: UTC+5:30 (IST)

Torbung (Note: Alternative spellings: Turbung, Turpung, and Torpung.) is a cluster of census villages split across the Bishnupur district and Churachandpur district in Manipur, India. The Bishnupur part of the village has a population of 2781, and the Churachandpur part a population of 2358 in the 2011 census. Torbung is watered by the Loklai river and the Torbung stream, which flow down from Thangjing hills to join the Khuga River. Torbung is a village of historical as well as current political significance. The Manipur conflict of 2023 started in the vicinity of the Torbung village.

== Name ==
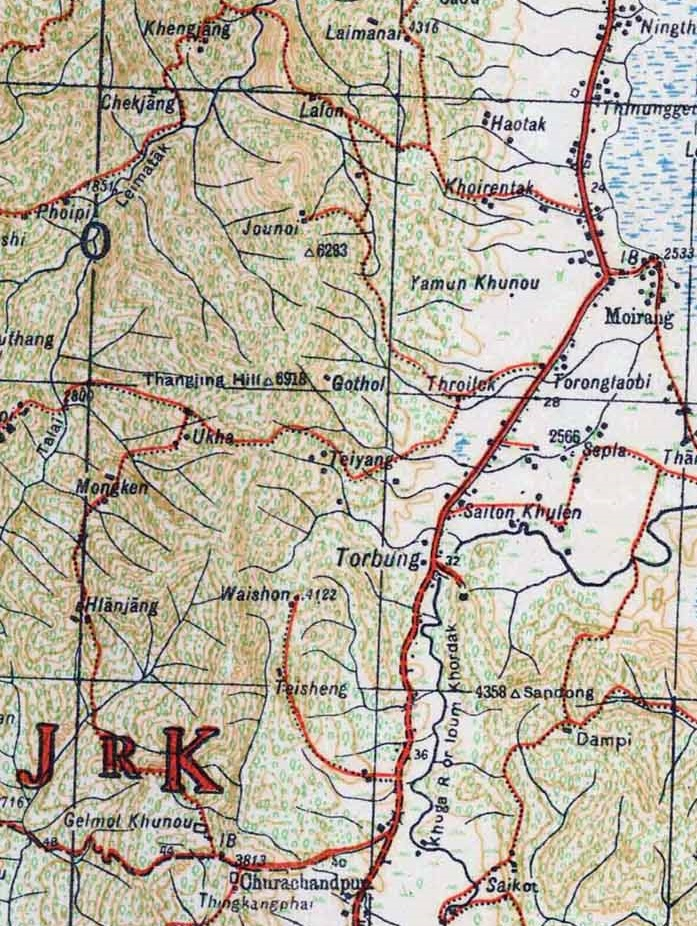
1944 Survey of India map showing Torbung to the south of the Loklai River.

Historical references indicate that the lower portion of the Khuga River valley (at the northern end) might have been referred to as "Torbung". The British Gazetteer of Manipur (1886) refers to the Khuga River as "Turbung stream", describing it as flowing in a "remarkably wide, flat-bottomed valley". It lists several villages in the Turbung valley as well as on the "Torbung stream", but none by the name Torbung.

A 1944 Survey of India map shows Torbung as a village at roughly the present location. But the use of "Torbung" to refer to the Khuga River valley continued beyond this date as a "Torbung road block" was fought during the World War II within the valley.

== Geography ==
The Torbung village is at the mouth of the Khuga River Valley bordering the Imphal Valley. A stream called Maichom Lok flows through the Torbung village. South of the area, another river called Loklai flows down from Thangjing Hills, takes a bend near the Pengjang village at the foothills and joins the Khuga River very near to the Torbung stream.

The Torbung village is split across the valley district of Bishnupur and the hill district of Churachandpur. The division is practically significant since the valley and hill districts in Manipur have different land revenue regulations. Scholar Roluah Puia states that the hill tribes (here Kuki-Zo people) living in border localities regard themselves as belonging to the hill districts (here Churachandpur), while the Meitei people in the same localities regarded themselves as belonging to the valley districts (here Bishnupur).

=== Torbung village in Bishnupur district ===
The Torbung village in the Bishnupur district is listed in the census with 1,257 hectares (12.57 km^{2}) area and a population of 2,781 people. This includes sub-villages such as Torbung Sabal and Torbung Govindpur, as well as villages further away such as Phougakchao Ikhai, Torbung Bangla and Waikhurok. All these villages are included in the gram panchayat (village council) of Torbung. Phougakchao Ikhai, which is really part of the Kangvai cluster of villages, is said to have a population of 2,000 people. Torbung Bangla and Waikhurok are further south, geographically in Churachandpur district. So, the population of the Torbung village itself may be only a few hundred people.

=== Torbung village in Churachandpur district ===
Churachandpur district's Torbung village is listed in the census with a population of 439 people, and other villages are listed separately: New Zalenphai (275 people), Matijang (646 people), Maichammun (290 people), S. Kotlian (411 people) and Torbung Loklaiphai (197 people), with a combined total of 2,358 people. The last two villages are on the bank of the Loklai River. All these villages are populated predominantly by Scheduled Tribes. (Note: The Scheduled Tribe proportions of the villages are: Torbung – 100 percent; New Zalenphai – 97 percent; Matijang – 91 percent; Maichammun – 98 percent; S. Kotlian – 99 percent; Loklaiphai – 97 percent.)

Tedim Road (part of the National Highway 2), connecting the Imphal and Churachandpur towns, passes through Torbung. About 1 km to the north of Torbung is the village of Kangvai, populated by Kuki-Zo people and the headquarters of a subdivision of the Churachandpur district. Further north is Phougakchao Ikhai, populated by Meitei people and included in the Torbung gram panchayat. These overlapping district jurisdictions makes it hard to depict geographic boundaries of districts. (Note: For example a government-sponsored map by the Manipur Remove Sensing Applications Centre puts almost all the villages described here within the geographical precincts of the Moirang Subdivision of Bishnupur district.)

== History ==
=== Early history ===
According to historian Jangkhomang Guite, during the medieval period, the Tripura kingdom extended its control over the southwestern hills of present-day Manipur up to the foothills of the Thangjing range. Manipur was at that time focused on its eastern frontier and conducted trade with the Burmese. In the 17th century, with the occasional invasions of Tripura into the Imphal valley, interactions began with Tripura. The southern frontier of the kingdom of Manipur was the southern end of the valley, i.e., the Torbung region.

Manipur's royal chronicle, Cheitharol Kumbaba mentions "Torbung" for the first time in 1712. An astrologer called Chantrasekhor, who was on his way to Tripura, was murdered "at Torbung, near Khuka" (possible reference to the Khuga River). In 1723, "Takhens" (Tripuris) are said to have attacked Manipur, encamping at present-day Torbung (mentioned as "Loklou" in the Chronicles). Skirmishes lasted an entire year and the Manipuris suffered significant losses. In the end, the ruler Gharib Niwaz himself came down to command the forces, there was hand-to-hand combat, and ten attackers were captured. "On the same day the Takhens [Tripuris] fled of their own accord from Loklou," says the Chronicle. (Note: It is quite possible that the "Takhens" mentioned in the Chronicle were local Kuki tribals, who were considered subjects of Tripura. For example, an entry in 1678 mentions that they were confused for the "Aaimon" people.)

In 1744, the "Katwan of Moirang" was given the charge of dredging the river in Loklou. There are also several mentions of "Loklaopung" (possibly a mound, which was dug up).

In 1769, during the rule of Bhagya Chandra (Chingthang-Khomba), the subsidiary ruler of the Moirang principality called Khellemba allied with the Burmese invading forces and governed the whole of Manipur while Bhagyachandra himself went into exile. Khellemba's capital was at Kwakta. He is said to have shifted the village of Kiyamgei (near Lilong Chajing) to Torbung, causing considerable hardship to people. Eventually Bhagyachandra defeated Khellemba and the forcible migration was reversed. In 1789–1790, Bhagyachandra launched an expedition to Saiton Hills lying to the south of the Imphal Valley, and encamped at Cheklapai near Torbung. (Note: The connection between Cheklapai and Torbung appears in a later entry of the Chronicle in 1862.) The result of the expedition seems to have been ambiguous since the tribals of Saiton Hills were not fully subdued. Cheitharol Kumbaba states that the soldiers blocked up the Loklai river.

Scholar Pum Khan Pau believes that the Khuga River valley might have been traversed by Manipuris for the first time in 1857, when Maharaja Chandrakirti led an expedition to Tedim (in the present day Chin State of Myanmar), which was then the central base of the Kamhau-Sukte tribes. The Manipuri troops fled "in confusion" after facing the combined troops of Kamhau, Sukte and Sihzang tribes, and returned to the Imphal Valley via a previously "unknown route", which is believed to be the Khuga River valley. The British laid the "Hiangtam Road" through the valley around 1920, and later expanded it to the Tedim Road during the Second World War.

In 1858, Torbung is mentioned as a region. The Maharaja of Manipur is said to have settled "Saitons" in a (new) village in Torbung. The Saiton Hills (the east–west-running range of hills on the southern boundary of the Imphal Valley) were invaded in 1789, but not fully subdued. In 1858 when the Maharaja came to Moirang to repel the Kamhaus (Aakam-Hao) tribes, a Haokip clan of Kukis apparently came down from Saiton hills to accept settlement in the Torbung region.

=== British Raj ===
The British-compiled Gazetteer of Manipur (1886) describes the "Turbung stream", which it describes as a fair-sized stream that enters the Manipur valley at its southwest corner. It is said to flow through a wide flat-bottomed valley, which is described as suitable for camping. The Gazetteer makes no mention of a village by the name Turbung, but mentions several villages along the stream or the valley of Turbung, including "Lairit" (a Kom village), "Mangyol" (a Kuki village of the Simmte clan), "Saikot" (a Kuki village of the Mangoung clan), "Saitul" (a Kuki village of Vungsun clan), and "Tunnam" (a Koireng village),

In 1872, the Maharaja sent an expedition to the Chivu salt springs (near Behiang, along the southern border of Manipur in the present time), ostensibly to support the British Lushai Expedition. The Manipuri troops camped there for two months, and arrested the Kamhau chief of Mualpi during their return journey. Even though the British officials decried the expedition as "treachery", the Maharaja succeeded in marking his desired territory. The Chivu expedition did not have any immediate consequences. The southern tribes continued to be either independent or tributary to the Kamhaus. From their base at Mualpi, the Kamhaus appear to have controlled the hills up to the Khuga River valley. The British administration reports narrate an incident in 1876, describing a clash between Manipur's Khongjai troops and the Kamhaus, with victory going to the Manipur troops.

In 1894, the British delineated the border between Manipur and the "Chin Hills", the latter being awarded to Burma. They ran the border close to the previously demarcated "Pemberton's line" (but not identical to it), and continued it to Chivu springs. According to scholar Pum Khan Pau, 47 tribal villages that paid tribute to the Kamhau chief were thus transferred to Manipur, including the entire southern part of the present-day Churachandpur district. Thus, Torbung became an interior location to the state of Manipur instead of being a border locality.

During World War II, the British constructed a motorable Tedim Road between Imphal and Tedim in 1942–1943. Seven decisive battles were fought along this road between the 17 Indian Division of British India and the 33 Division of Japan. The Japanese reached Churachandpur on 8 April 1944, and four of these battles were fought within Manipur, including one at "Torbung". The Japanese were eventually defeated at Imphal and withdrew from Manipur with heavy losses.

=== Independent period ===
After Manipur's merger with India in 1949, the whole state was administered as a single district. The Bishnupur ("Bishenpur") subdivision was established some time between 1951 and 1961, and Torbung was included in it. By 1991, Bishnupur has been made a district.

As a key interaction point between the valley communities of Meitei people and the Kuki tribes of the Churachandpur district, Torbung has often been in the news. Protests were held by the valley communities against the renaming of Thangjing Hill and another group opposed the protest. Women protesters from the tribal communities protested against three controversial bills passed by the Manipur assembly in 2015, who were in turn opposed by other women's groups.

=== Manipur conflict (2023–present) ===
The Torbung area was also the epicentre of the Manipur ethnic conflict that erupted in 2023. On 3 May 2023, as the tribal communities protested the Meitei community's demand for the scheduled tribe status, the valley communities organised a "counter-blockade" at Torbung and "counter agitation" from the Moirang subdivision, which led to clashes between the two sides near Torbung. Properties were burned on both the sides of the district border. The resulting tensions led to a multi-year ethnic violence resulting in over 260 deaths and over 60,000 people displaced.

The first casualty of the violence on 3 May was at Torbung. A pastor called Sehkhohao Kipgen was lynched to death. His body was dumped in a ditch in the Meitei part of the town and could not be retrieved by Kukis. A Meitei man was also fatally injured on that day in Torbung and died in an Imphal hospital the next day. He was an Arambai Tenggol activist from Ithai, who reportedly went to Torbung to "save people's lives and houses". The Kuki Organisation for Human Rights (KOHUR) said that it was only after the lynchings of Kipgen and another Kuki-Zo man that Kukis started firing gun shots. The mobs were very violent on that day according to a senior police officer. The Director General of Police P. Doungel, who went to Torbung to control the situation, had to be evacuated.

== See also ==
- List of populated places in Chandel district

== Bibliography ==
- Annual Administration Report of the Munnipoor Agency, For the year ending 30th June 1874–75, Selections from the Records of the Government of India (Foreign Department), Calcutta: The Foreign Department Press, 1876 – via archive.org
- Bishnupur District Census Handbook (PDF), Directorate of Census Operations, Manipur, 2011
- Churachandpur District Census Handbook (PDF), Directorate of Census Operations, Manipur, 2011
- Dun, E. W. (1992) [1886], Gazetteer of Manipur, Manas Publications – via archive.org
- Kamei, Gangmumei (1991), History of Manipur, Volume 1: Pre-colonial period, National Publishing House, ISBN 9788121403627 – via archive.org
- Guite, Jangkhomang (July–December 2024), "Peopling in the Empire's Borderland: A Note on Kuki History and Ancestry in Northeast India", Journal of North East India Studies, 14 (2): 43–75
- Parratt, Saroj Nalini Arambam (2005). The Court Chronicle of the Kings of Manipur: The Cheitharon Kumpapa, Volume 1. London: Routledge. ISBN 9780415344302.
- Parratt, Saroj Nalini Arambam (2009). The Court Chronicle of the Kings of Manipur: The Cheitharon Kumpapa, Volume 2. Foundation Books / Cambridge University Press India. ISBN 978-81-7596-854-7.
- Parratt, Saroj Nalini Arambam (2013). The Court Chronicle of the Kings of Manipur: The Cheitharon Kumpapa, Volume 3. Foundation Books / Cambridge University Press India. ISBN 978-93-8226-498-9.
- Pau, Pum Khan (2012), "Tedim Road—The Strategic Road on a Frontier: A Historical Analysis", Strategic Analysis, 36 (5): 776–786, doi:10.1080/09700161.2012.712387
- Pau, Pum Khan (2019), Indo-Burma Frontier and the Making of the Chin Hills: Empire and Resistance, Taylor & Francis, ISBN 9781000507454
- Puia, Roluah (2021), "When boundaries matter: land, laws and territorial conflict in Manipur, Northeast India", in Kedilezo Kikhi; Dharma Rakshit Gautam (eds.), Comprehending Equity, Taylor & Francis, pp. 98–, doi:10.4324/9781003182726-8, ISBN 9781003182726 – via academia.edu
