= Khuga River =

River in India

Khuga River Tuitha River
- Location within Manipur Location within India

Location
- Country: India
- State: Manipur
- Districts: Churachandpur, Bishnupur

Physical characteristics
- Source
  - coordinates: 24.0821°N 93.6479°E
- Mouth
  - coordinates: 24.4285°N 93.8378°E

Basin features
- Progression: Manipur River
- River system: Chindwin
- Waterbodies: Khuga Reservoir

Khuga River, (Note: Alternative spellings: Khuka and Khooka.) also known as the Tuitha River, is a river in Manipur, India. It originates in the Churachandpur district and flows through the district for much of its course. It enters the Imphal Valley near Torbung, and flows east, joining the Manipur River near Ithai. The Khuga River valley in the Churachandpur district is thickly populated, with the Churachandpur town and numerous villages.

== Course ==
The Khuga River originates in the southern part of the Churachandpur district, close to the border with Chin State (Myanmar), and flows north into the Imphal Valley south of Moirang. The upper course of the river is traditionally called "Tuitha" in Kuki-Chin languages. But the name is also applied to a south-flowing head stream of the river originating near Mount Mulam. British maps have noted this headstream as "Hilpi River". Another headstream flowing north from the southern borders joins this stream near Hiangtam Khul (24.0821°N 93.6479°E), forming the Khuga River.

The combined river flows due north, breaking into a wide plain near the Mata village, which is referred to as the "Lamka plain" (Lamka zaang). Near Mata, a multi-purpose dam called Mata Dam (or Khuga Dam) has been constructed in 2010. It forms a long reservoir, submerging much of the upper valley. After the dam, the Khuga river flows for about 16 km through the Lamka plain/Khuga valley before entering the Imphal Valley near Torbung (in the Bishnupur district).

Near Torbung, streams from Thangjing hills to the west, prominently the Torbung stream, join the Khuga River, as does the outlet stream of the Loktak Lake. The combined river flows east and joins the Imphal River near Ithai to form the Manipur River.

== Valley ==
Khuga River flows through a wide valley, which appears as if it is an extension of the Imphal Valley. The second largest town of Manipur, Churachandpur, locally known as Lamka, lies in the valley. Numerous other villages also dot the valley, housing a large portion of the Churachandpur district's population. The region has been referred to as the "Lamka plain".

The Tedim Road, running between the Imphal city and the town of Tedim in the Chin State of Myanmar, partly runs through the Lamka plain / Khuga river valley. It leaves the valley near the village of S. Geltui, and follows a hill route to reach Singngat, after which it enters the Tuivai River valley up to the town of Behiang on the India-Myanmar border.

== History ==
The Khuga River was relatively unknown to the history of Manipur. Its first mention is found in Cheitharol Kumbaba (Manipuri court chronicles) in the year 1712, noting a murder at "Torbung, near Khuka". After the British began to exert their influence in Manipur, they regarded the southwestern part of the present-day Manipur state vaguely as part of "Lushai hills". The Manipur kingdom extended only to the southern periphery of the Imphal Valley. It was referred to as the "Moirang frontier" in an administrative report in 1876. The Gazetteer of Manipur, published in 1886, makes no mention of the Khuga River and uses the name "Turbung stream" for its lower course running in the Imphal Valley.

Scholar Pum Khan Pau believes that the Khuga River valley might have been traversed by Manipuris for the first time in 1857, when Maharaja Chandrakirti led an expedition to Tedim (in the present day Chin State of Myanmar), then the central base of the Kamhau-Sukte tribes. The Manipuri troops fled "in confusion" after facing the combined troops of Kamhau, Sukte and Sihzang tribes, and returned to the Imphal Valley via a previously "unknown route", which eventually formed the route of the present day Tedim Road along the Khuga River valley.

In 1872, the Maharaja sent another expedition to the Chivu salt springs (near modern Behiang), ostensibly to support the British Lushai Expedition. The Manipuri troops camped there for two months, and, during their return journey, arrested the Kamhau chief of Mualpi by name Go Khaw Thang. Even though the British officials decried the expedition as "treachery", the Maharaja succeeded in marking his claimed territory. In 1894, when the British delineated the border between Manipur and Chin Hills, they rant it close to the Chivu salt springs.

During the Kuki Rebellion of 1917–1919, the British constructed a road to Hiangtam, south of Singngat along the Khuga River valley. Hiangtam was described as a stronghold of the Kuki rebels, and the British needed a way to send troops and supplies. The junction point of the Hiangtam road and the Tipaimukh road came to be known as Hiangtam Lamka, which formed the core of the modern Lamka or Churachandpur town.

During World War II, the British improved the Hiangtam road and extended it to Tedim for the defence of eastern frontier of India. The resulting road came to be known as the Tedim Road, running between the Imphal City and the town of Tedim. Seven decisive battles were fought along this road between the 17 Division of British India and the 33 Division of Japan. The Japanese reached Churachandpur on 8 April 1944, and four additional battles were fought within Manipur, including one near Torbung. Eventually the Japanese were defeated at Imphal and withdrew with heavy losses.

== Bibliography ==
- Churachandpur District Census Handbook (PDF), Directorate of Census Operations, Manipur, 2011
- Parratt, Saroj Nalini Arambam (2005). The Court Chronicle of the Kings of Manipur: The Cheitharon Kumpapa, Volume 1. London: Routledge. ISBN 0-415-34430-1.
- Pau, Pum Khan (2012), "Tedim Road—The Strategic Road on a Frontier: A Historical Analysis", Strategic Analysis, 36 (5): 776–786, doi:10.1080/09700161.2012.712387
- Pau, Pum Khan (2019), Indo-Burma Frontier and the Making of the Chin Hills: Empire and Resistance, Taylor & Francis, ISBN 9781000507454
