= L Khengjang =

L. Khengjang is a village in Churachandpur district of Manipur, India.
