= William McCulloch (political officer) =

British colonial administrator

Asst. Political Agent, Manipur
- In office 1840–1844

Political Agent, Manipur
- In office 1844–1863
- Preceded by: George Gordon
- Succeeded by: Dillon

Political Agent, Manipur
- In office 1864–1867
- Preceded by: Dillon
- Succeeded by: Robert Brown

Personal details
- Born: 28 February 1916 Edinburgh
- Died: 4 April 1885 (aged 69) Shillong, Assam
- Parent: John Ramsay McCulloch (father)
- Education: Addiscombe College

Military service
- Allegiance: Great Britain
- Branch/service: Bengal Native Infantry
- Rank: Lieutenant Colonel

William McCulloch (1816–1885) was a British army and political officer in India. He served as the Political Agent for the Manipur Kingdom, a de facto British protectorate on the border with Burma, for a period of 27 years. He acquired an intimate knowledge of the land and the people of Manipur, publishing a book, Account of the Valley of Munnipore and of the Hill Tribes, which has been regarded as authoritative by later writers.

== Early life ==
William McCulloch was born in Edinburgh in 1816 to John Ramsay McCulloch, political economist and wife Isabella. He was educated in Edinburgh high school. He joined East India Company Military Seminary (military academy) at Addiscombe in 1833 and was commissioned to the company army the following year.

== Career ==
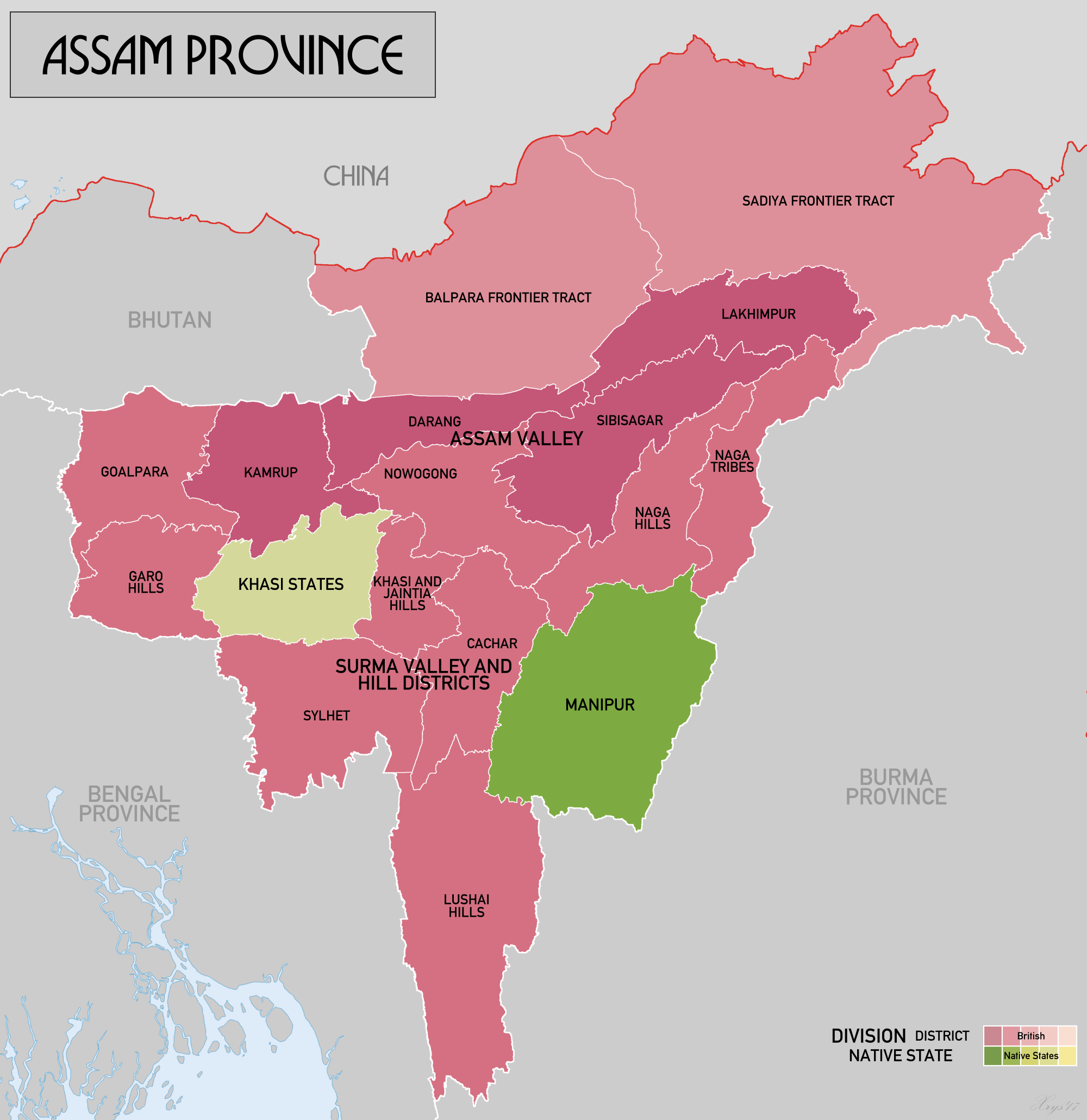
Manipur kingdom in green with respect to the Assam Province (1936 map)

McCulloch arrived at Fort William, Kolkata in 1835, and served in the Bengal Native Infantry at Dinapore (Danapur), Benares (Varanasi) and Bareilly. He commanded a detachment at Deolia and was promoted to lieutenant in 1839.

In 1840, he was appointed assistant to the Political Agent of the Kingdom of Manipur (which had a newly established Political Agency from 1835). In 1844 he was made the Political Agent, to succeed George Gordon. He held that post till 1867, with a year's intermission. According to T. C. Hodson, he acquired an intimate knowledge of Manipur and its inhabitants during this long tenure. He published a book titled Account of the Valley of Munnipore and of the Hill Tribes in 1859. Scholar Pum Khan Pau credits him with establishing "peace in the region", which was otherwise subject to raids by war-like tribes from the Chin Hills and Lushai Hills. In 1861, the Government of India considered abolishing the Political Agency in Manipur, regarding it uneconomical. McCulloch argued for its retention in the interest of peace in the neighbouring areas, and the agency was retained.

McCulloch married a Manipuri lady, from the family of Raja Nara Singh. After his retirement in 1867, he settled in Shillong (in the neighbouring Assam Province). He died in 1885.

== Manipur ==
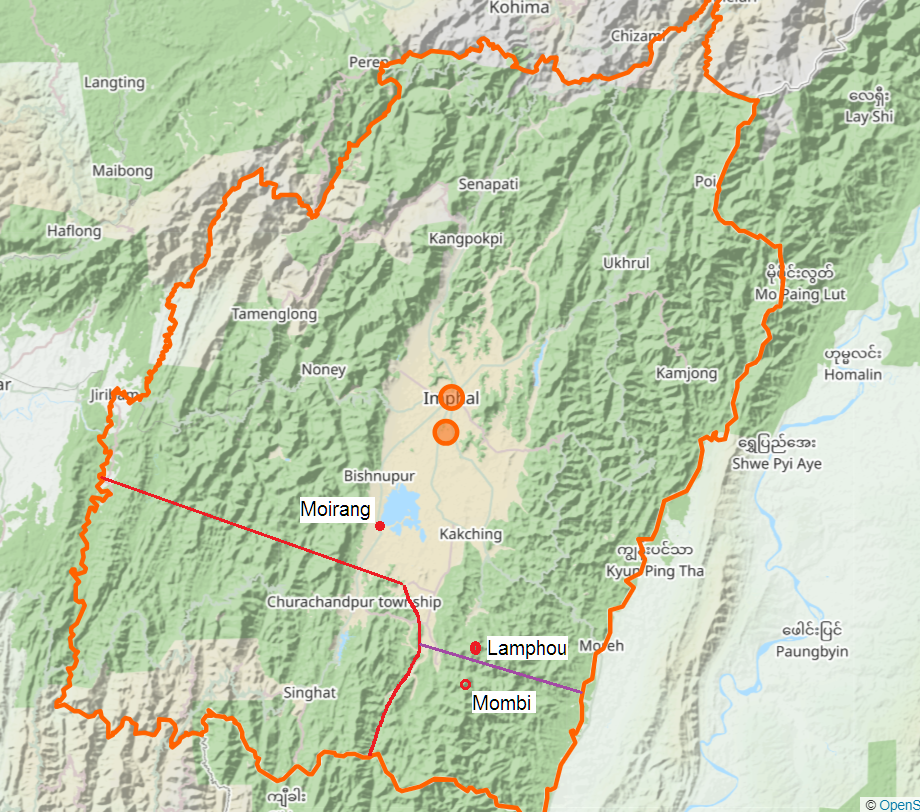
Manipur kingdom as it might have been during McCulloch's time; the southeastern part was nominally included in Manipur by Pemberton, but it was under the control of Kamhau-Suktes; the southwestern part was unknown and unexplored

Manipur, a small kingdom on the eastern frontier of India, became a British protectorate in 1826 at the end of the First Anglo-Burmese War. Major F. J. Grant and Captain Boileau Pemberton, acted as British commissioners to Manipur. After the death of Raja Gambhir Singh in 1834, his infant son Chandrakirti Singh was appointed the king, and brother Nara Singh was appointed as the Regent. At the same time, the British established a permanent political agency in Manipur with Captain George Gordon, the commander of the Manipur Levy, as the full-time Political Agent. In 1844, Chandrakirti went into exile with Nara Singh being made king. Nara Singh's rule lasted till 1850, when Chandrakirti returned and assumed the throne. The Political Agency ensured stability during this period of internal turmoil in Manipur.

=== Administration of hill tribes ===
Before his death, Gambhir Singh set about to subdue the hill tribes using the firearms provided to him by the British. The Kabuis, Tangkhuls, and Angamis (all Naga tribes) were apparently reduced and "severe measures" adopted. The Kuki tribes (called "Khongjais" by the Manipuris) were apparently not included in this action by Gambhir Singh. They inhabited the hills to the south and southwest of the Manipur valley, which were not subject to the Manipur kingdom at that time. Soon afterwards, the Kamhau-Suktes in the Chin Hills and the Lushai tribes in the Lushai Hills rose to prominence and exerted pressure on the Kukis, who started moving north as a result.

Scholar Pum Kan Pau states that it was only after the appointment of McCulloch in 1844 that an effort was made to establish peace in the region. With the agreement of Nara Singh, McCulloch undertook the settlement of Kukis, allocating them lands for cultivation. He also recruited them as irregular forces and asked them to man the villages on the southern frontier of the kingdom to guard against raids from the southern tribes. These villages came to be called "sepoy villages".

James Johnstone, a later Political Agent (1877–1886), portrays a dramatic picture of the developments during McCulloch's time:

The Kukis are a wandering race consisting of several tribes who have long been working up from the South. They were first heard of as Kukis, in Manipur, between 1830 and 1840; though tribes of the same race had long been subject to the Rajah of Manipur. The new immigrants began to cause anxiety about the year 1845, and soon poured into the hill tracts of Manipur in such numbers, as to drive away many of the older inhabitants. Fortunately, the political agent (at this time Lieutenant afterwards Colonel McCulloch) was a man well able to cope with the situation. Cool and resolute, he at once realised and faced the difficulty. Manipur in those days, owing to intestine quarrels, could have done nothing, and the Rajah Nur Singh [Nara Singh] gladly handed over the management of the new arrivals to him.

McCulloch's own writing does not paint such an exaggerated picture. He writes that the Kukis "until lately occupied the hills to the south of the [Kabuis]" (i.e. in the present day Churachandpur and Pherzawl districts). They were being driven north by the war-like tribes from the south, and are "now scattered around the Valley of Munnipore, and thence through the hills to North and South Cachar". McCulloch also records the curious tradition that the Kukis believed that they had come to the south from the north, which was also corroborated by the Kabui tradition that they were then living in sites previously occupied by Kukis. Robert Brown, Political Agent during 1866–1875, stated that the present day Churachandpur and Pherzawl districts were virtually uninhabited due to pressure from the Lushais.

In a memorandum of McCulloch from 1861, we notice him being exercised about the welfare of the Kabuis, (Note: Kabuis are a Naga tribe that inhabit the Tamanglong and Noney districts, to the northwest of Imphal Valley.) who lived along the Old Cachar Road and the area to the north of it. (Note: The Old Cachar Road, or simply "Cachar Road" or "Manipur Road", was a rugged mountain track between Silchar and Bishnupur. The British were unable to negotiate it during the Anglo-Burmese War and the Manipur Levy was utilised instead. After the war, the British set upon to improve it into a regular bridle path as it was a strategic border road.) McCulloch states that they were leaving their villages due to "oppression". Apparently, the British made a treaty with Manipur when they transferred Jiribam to the latter, placing the condition that the tribes along the road would not be oppressed or prevented from taking their products to Cachar. McCulloch was responsible for enforcing the treaty. McCulloch also states that he had the job of "superintendence" of the Kuki tribes, who were "all round the valley, and to the west", as they had been driven from their homes by their enemies.

By combining these two responsibilities, McCulloch states that he had established a line of Kuki villages to the south of the Kabui territory as a buffer to the Kabuis. He had also established such villages to the south of the valley to guard the territory of Manipur. The Kukis of such "sepoy villages" were given unrestricted lands for cultivation and arms, and had the job of sending around scouts to the south to bring advance warning of the southern war-like tribes that might conduct raids.

== Biography ==
- Brown, R. (1874), Statistical Account of the Native State of Manipur and the Hill Territory under Its Rule, Calcutta: Office of the Superintendent of Government Printing
- Carey, Bertram S.; Tuck, H. N. (1896), The Chin Hills, Volume I, Government Printing, Burma
- Dun, E. W. (1992) [1886], Gazetteer of Manipur, Manas Publications – via archive.org
- Hodson, T. C. (1908), The Meitheis, London: David Nutt – via archive.org
- Ibochou Singh, Khwairakpam (1985). British administration in Manipur 1891–1947 (PhD thesis). Gauhati University. hdl:10603/66697 – via Shodhganga.
- Johnstone, Sir James (1896), My Experiences in Manipur and the Naga Hills, London: Sampson Low, Marston and Company – via archive.org
- Mackenzie, Alexander (1884), History of the Relations of the Government with the Hill Tribes of the North-East Frontier of Bengal, Calcutta: Home Department Press – via archive.org
- McCulloch, W. (1859). Account of the Valley of Munnipore and of the Hill Tribes. Selections from the Records of the Government of India (Foreign Department). Calcutta: Bengal Printing Company. OCLC 249105916 – via archive.org.
- Pau, Pum Khan (2012), "Tedim Road—The Strategic Road on a Frontier: A Historical Analysis", Strategic Analysis, 36 (5): 776–786, doi:10.1080/09700161.2012.712387
- Pau, Pum Khan (2019), Indo-Burma Frontier and the Making of the Chin Hills: Empire and Resistance, Taylor & Francis, ISBN 9781000507454
- Tarapot, Phanjoubam (2003), Bleeding Manipur, Har-Anand Publications, ISBN 978-81-241-0902-1
