= Sumchinvum =

Village in India

Sumchinvum is a small village in Singngat-Sub-Division, Churachandpur District, Manipur, India. It was also known as 'Dimmual' by the Tedim people inhibiting in the village before the Kuki–Paite ethnic clash of 1997–98.

== Geography ==
Sumchinvum is located 29 km from the district headquarter, Churachandpur and 95 km from Imphal, the capital of Manipur. The postal index number, PIN code of Sumchinvum is 795139. It is surrounded by Muallum village, Haijang Village, New Laijang Village and Singngat Village. The time-zone of Sumchinvum is IST (UTC+5:30) and Telephone Code / Std Code is 03874. Singngat Post Office is the nearest Post Office from Sumchinvum.

== Demography ==
The 2011 census of India recorded the population of Sumchinvum as 999 of which 496 are males and 503 are females. The literacy rate of Sumchinvum is 63.60% which is relatively lower as compare to the state which is 76.94%. The literacy rate of male is 70.33% and female is 56.72%. Also the village code of Sumchinvum is 269833 according to the 2011 census of India.

== Ethnic groups ==
The Zou community are the majority ethnic group inhibiting in Sumchinvum. Though the Village Chief is from the Kuki community, still the languages, cultures and traditions of the Zou community is followed in the village. Apart from the Zou and Kuki, ethnic groups like the Meitei and the Tedim people also reside in the village.

== Languages ==
The main languages spoken in the village is Zou. Moreover, dialects like the Thadou-Kuki is also spoken by some households.
