= Simveng =

Simveng is a locality in the Churachandpur Town (also called Lamka), in the Indian state of Manipur in India. The name has a double relevance. It is the short for 'Simte locality' being a colony founded and inhabited by Simte tribesmen. But it may also stand for 'South colony' (Sim-south, Veng-colony), being situated toward the south of the township. Its neighbouring colonies are Rengkai towards the east, Tedim Road towards the west, Beulahlane and Lailam veng towards the north, and New Lamka towards the south. Over the years Simveng has grown to have a sizable concentration of people from other tribes like Zo, Mizo, and Paite, as well. The New Testament Baptist Church and the Simte Youth organisation's Community Hall are the landmarks of this locality in Lamka. Simveng is uniquely blessed with a perennial spring and water stream that does not dry up in any season when other parts of the town experience drought or scarcity of drinking water.
