= Peniel, Manipur =

Peniel
- Village
- Location in Manipur, India Peniel (India)
- Coordinates: 24°22′55″N 93°42′5″E
- Country: India
- State: Manipur
- District: Churachandpur
- Subdivision: Churachandpur
- Police Station: Churachandpur
- Established: 2005
- Founder: Elder T. Lhunkholet Haokip

Government
  - Body: Village Authority

Population
  - Total: 135
- Time zone: UTC+5:30 (IST)
- PIN: 795128
- Telephone code: +91-3874-
- Vehicle registration: MN-02
- Website: manipur.gov.in

Peniel is a village in Churachandpur district of Manipur, India.

== Etymology ==
The word Peniel is derived from Hebrew Language "Penuel" meaning "Face of God". It is then a name of a placed named when after Jacob see God face to face, and his life was spared; wherein Jacob's name was changed to Israel.
The same has been replicated to the name of village under Tuibong T.D. Block, Churachandpur Sub-Division, Churachandpur District, Manipur State, India.

== Chief ==
Elder T. Lhunkholet Haokip, Block Development Officer (BDO) in Sangaikot TD Block, Churachandpur, Manipur is the Chief of Peniel Village.

== History ==
Before the establishment of Peniel Village, on 15 January 2003 Peniel Evangelical Congregational Church was established among Indian Christians residing in Koite/Kumbipukhri; the village was established in the same year. Until April 2007, no form of layout plantation and construction was initiated. From 24 May 2007 till 7 July 2007 Peniel EC Church construction was completed within 54 days. On 7 July 2007 i.e., 07-07-07 Peniel EC Church was inaugurated and dedicated.

In the early part of 2008, Mr. Vungkholun Khongsai and their family completed their house and became the first to settler in Peniel Village. Later on, one by one, family from different place shifted and a complete village was fashioned in to being under the name "Peniel Village".

== Administration ==
The Village is administered by the Village Authority (VA) as its head of the village governing body. The Chief acts himself as the Chief Justice of the Village Court as per customary law practice of the Thadou.
Youth Club, Water Welfare and Electricity Welfare are all the autonomous body under the Village Authority of Peniel Village.

== Infrastructure ==
1. 24x7 Water supply funded by Non-Lapsable Central Pool of Resources (NLCPR) Scheme for Churachandpur Town Zone I where Tanky being situated at K. Mongjang Village at an estimated cost of Rs 14 crores with water source from Koite and Loklao rivers.
2. Electrified- Singhat Line Connection.
3. A Reserved of 100' X 150' size playground ground for children and sports activities.
4. Pucca Road- An IVR of 0.3 km from NH-150 or Koite Village i.e., SEDO Henglep Road.
5. Semi-Pucca Road within the village with pucca side drain or nullah.

== Composition ==
Peniel Village is populated by various ethnic tribes and clans. Majority of the villagers are Thadou and means of communication among the villagers is purely in Thadou language.

The total number of Household as per updated on 5 February 2015 is 40.
