= Kukimun =

- village
- Location in Manipur, India
- Coordinates: 24.595°N 93.682°E
- Country: India
- State: Manipur
- Churachandpur: Henglep

Languages
  - Official: Eipao (Kuki)
- Time zone: UTC+5:30 (IST)
- Postal code: 795124
- Vehicle registration: MN
- Website: manipur.gov.in

Kukimun is a village in the Churachanpur district of Manipur, India.
