= S. Haijang =

S. Haijang is a village in the Churachandpur District of Manipur, India.
