= Khuga Dam =

Dam in India

Tuitha dam
- Location within Manipur Location within India
- Coordinates: 24.2816949°N 93.679743°E
- Construction cost: ~ INR 2.5 billion

Dam and spillways
- Height: 38
- Width (base): 230

Tuitha Dam impounds the Tuitha River south of Churachandpur town (Manipur), India. The multipurpose project supplies electricity and water. It was started in 1983 and resumed in 2002 after being at a standstill for a period of time. The work is nearing its completion and the structure was scheduled to be commissioned during 2007. On 12 November 2010, Sonia Gandhi, then chairperson of the National Advisory Council, inaugurated the dam.

Description

- Height: 38 meters
- Width: 230 meters
- Cost estimate: INR 2.5 billion

Implementing companies:

- NPCC for earthen dam, spillways and canal
- R M Sinha & Co for power house and water supply

Present Status:

- Although the project has been inaugurated in 2010 by Smt. Sonia Gandhi, the irrigation canal is functional up to a few kilometres downstream, and the remaining part remains dry.
- The proposed hydroelectricity generation from the project never materialise. As of today not a single unit of electricity is generated from the dam. Paradoxically, no power house for generating electricity existed till today i.e. 17 March 2021 and may never be.
