= Suangdoh =

- village within Suangdoh subdivision
- Location in Manipur, India Suangdoh (India)
- Coordinates: 24°5′11.40″N 93°29′0.76″E
- Country: India
- State: Manipur
- District: Churachandpur
- Founder: Guite

Population (2001)
  - Total: 1,337

Languages
  - Official: Paite
- Time zone: UTC+5:30 (IST)
- PIN: 795139
- Vehicle registration: MN

Suangdoh is a mid-sized village and the headquarters of Suangdoh Sub-Division/TD Block, Churachandpur district, Manipur, Northeast India. It is located along Guite Road/NH-102B within what is known as the Guite Kual. Most of the villages in this area are headed by a Chief of the Guite clan.

== Political History ==
Suangdoh has always been under Guite rule. Among the Guites, the Suangdoh Chiefs are descendants of Thangpau, the third son of Innpipa Pu Vummang, the 17th direct descendant of Pu Guite. From his capital in present-day Teddim, Pu Vummang ruled over many villages who paid him taxes and owe him allegiance.

== Location ==
The village was originally situated on a hilltop approximately 5 km north of its current location. It bordered Sialbu to the north and Lungchin to the south, with the Tuivel and Tuilak rivers marking its eastern and western boundaries. Today, Tuiveljang, Tuilakjang, Doupau and Chiangpi were curved out of Suangdoh land, and its lands had been considerably reduced.

To the east, it borders Tuimanjang, Mualjin and Maukot villages while to the north lies C. Tuiveljang, Mongken, Doupau, Chiangpi and Sialbu villages. To the west lies Tuilakjang, G. Bualjang, Lungthul (T) and Lungthul (E) villages. And finally to the south were Enpum, Lungchin, Tuikuimuallum and Ngaljang villages.

In the early 1990s, the then Chief Mr Khamchinpau Guite decided to move the village to a place originally known as Hiangtui, as the “new” Guite Road did not pass through Suangdoh. Thus, the village is now situated about 5 km from its original location, on a low-lying flat top.

In the year 2016, Suangdoh Sub-Division/TD Block was established, covering about 30 villages in the region. The two nearest Tehsils are Singngat (35 km) and Mualnuam (40 km) while the district headquarters, Lamka is 60 km to its north. Today, the village has over 200 households, a PHC/ Health & Wellness Centre, a Government High School and a Church-run Junior High School called Kaikhoen Academy. It is approximately 2 km long.

The rivers Tuivel, Tuilak, Tuivai, Zaupilui, Louhak lui, Govomlui, and Enpailui flows in and around Suangdoh.

== People ==
As per Census of India 2011, Suangdoh is inhabited by 247 households with a population of 1402 persons out of which 707 are male and 695 female.

Their main occupation is jhuming cultivation while other forms of horticultural farming and animal husbandry are also practiced.
