= Ngurte =

Village in Manipur, India

Ngurte Ngurte
- Village
- Location in Manipur, India Ngurte (India)
- Coordinates: 24.297°N 93.720°E
- Country: India

Population (2011)
  - Total: 604.

Languages
  - Official: Hmar
- Time zone: UTC+5:30 (IST)
- PIN: 795143
- Vehicle registration: MN

Ngurte (anglicized: Ngoor-te) is a Hmar village in Churachandpur district, India.
