= Sangaikot =

- Town
- Location in Manipur, India Sangaikot (India)
- Coordinates: 24.293963°N 93.839343°E
- Country: India
- State: Manipur
- District: Churachandpur
- Subdivision: Churachandpur
- Police Station: Churachandpur
- Established: 1931

Government
  - Body: Village Authority

Population
  - Total: 2,000
- Time zone: UTC+5:30 (IST)
- PIN: 795128
- Telephone code: +91-3874-
- Vehicle registration: MN-02
- Website: manipur.gov.in

Sangaikot is a small town and a subdivisional headquarters in Churachandpur district of Manipur. It has a population of 676 of which 338 are males while 338 are females as per Population Census 2011

== Geography ==
Sangaikot has its own police station and Sub Divisional Office. One of the prominent schools Agape English High School is also situated. The town is a mix of Thadou and Zou tribes.
