= Tollen =

- village
- Location in Manipur, India Tollen (India)
- Coordinates: 24°24′08″N 93°42′20″E
- Country: India
- State: Manipur

Languages
  - Official: Meiteilon (Manipuri)
- Time zone: UTC+5:30 (IST)
- Vehicle registration: MN
- Website: manipur.gov.in

Tollen is a village in Churachandpur district in Manipur, India. It is located 6 km from Churachandpur and 54 kilometres (34 mi) from Imphal. In 2011, it had 551 inhabitants.
