= Rengkai =

- Village
- Interactive map of Rengkai
- Location in Manipur, India Rengkai (India)
- Coordinates: 24.34104°N 93.70418°E
- Country: India
- State: Manipur
- District: Churachandpur district
- Founded: 1938
- Founder: Kailien

Population (2011)
  - Total: 8,293

Languages
  - Official: Hmar

Literacy rate
  - Official: 93.29%
- Time zone: UTC+5:30 (IST)
- PIN: 795128
- Vehicle registration: MN 02

Rengkai is one of the constituent villages of what is normally called the "Churachandpur town" in Manipur, India. The Census of India tabulates Rengkai as a "town" based on its clear urban characteristics. It is also the largest such town with a population of over 8,000 people. (Note: The population of Rengkai in the 2011 census is 8,293 people. The other two census towns of Churachandpur are Zenhang Lamka, with 7,771 people, and Hill Town, with 2,293 people.)

== Geography ==
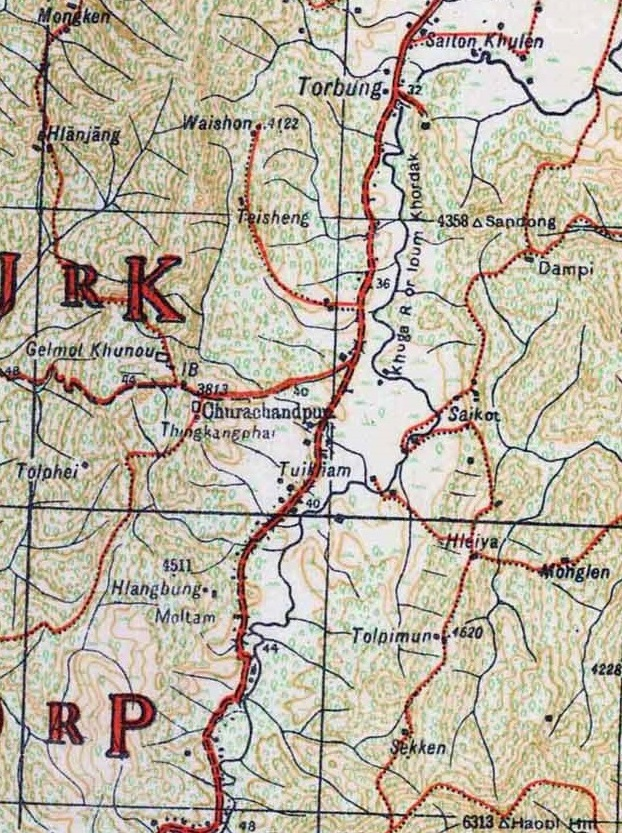
A 1944 Survey of India map shows a settlement at the junction of Tedim Road and Tipaimukh Road (Hiangtam Lamka) and two settlements to its east on both the sides of the Khuga River. The latter represent Rengkai.

Rengkai is to the southeast of the town centre of Churachandpur, spanning both the banks of the Khuga River. The town centre being the junction of Tedim Road and Tipaimukh Road, a road to the east leading to Sugnu also emanates from the same junction. The Sugnu Road is also called Rengkai Road within the Churachandpur town. It crosses the Khuga River inside Rengkai via the "Rengkai Bridge".

To the west of Rengkai is Simveng, to the northeast is Muol-Vaiphei, and to the south is New Lamka. The town is nestled alongside the Khuga River, characterized by a generally flat terrain with hills in the vicinity. Sitting at an elevation of 914 meters (2,999 feet) above sea level, the Muolhlum Hill stands as the principal elevation within the town. The topography gradually slopes downward towards Zote Veng in the eastern part of the town.

The Khuga River is locally known as "Tuithapui".

=== Localities ===
Rengkai is divided into 18 localities constituting a group of houses. Some of these localities vary in size and population. The 18 divisions of Rengkai based on localities are:

A.G. Road	Bethlehem Veng	Bible Hill
Bridge Street	Cemetery Road	Edenthar
Muolhlum	Nehru Marg	Rengkai Road
Shan Veng	Shillong Hills	Tahiti Hill
Thailane Veng	Venglai	Vengpui
Vengthlang	Zion Veng	Zote Veng

== History ==
The Rengkai village is said to have been founded in 1938 by the Hmar community. The first village chief was Kailien. It was listed among the hill villages of the Churachandpur Circle in the schedule to the Hill Peoples (Administration) Regulation, 1947.

In 1956, the village came under a Village Authority, with the village chief acting as its chairman.

Rengkai Village Authority (1956-2022)
Term	Chairman	Secretary	Members
1956-1960	Sailienlung	HB Duma	Ralleng, L. Taivel, Hleia, Vanrosang, J. Tusing
1961-1965	J.C. Chongkholien	Vanrosang	Ralleng, L. Taivel, Hrangkaphlei, Tluanga
1966-1970	J.C. Chongkholien	L. Taivel	Ralleng, Hrangkaphlei, Tluanga, Vanrosang
1971-1975	J.C. Chongkholien	H. Thuomte	Ralleng, L. Taivel, J. Tusing, Vanrosang
1976-1979	J.C. Chongkholien	H. Thuomte	L. Taivel, J. Tusing, Vanrosang, L. Neithang, Changa, Hrangkaphlei, S. Hnuna, Zothansei
1980-1991	J.C. Chongkholien	H. Thuomte	Zothansei, S. Hnuna, L. Taivel, Fima, J. Sanghlun, Hrangkaphlei, L. Sanglur, Thangsavung, Changa, Thangthuom, Thanglienthuom
1992-2007	J.C. Chongkholien	H. Thuomte, Thanglienthuom	Changa, Dr. HL Liensang, Joseph Lalrothang, HK Joute, LT Zuola, J. Lungawi, Phirthangsei Varte, Zothanglien, Lalhming Varte, Hmangkhum
2007-2012	J.C. Chongkholien	Thanglienthuom	Lal H Varte, Lienhmingthang, HK Joute, Joseph Lalrothang, Dr. HL Liensang, Zothanglur, Laltanlien Joute, Ramthanglien, Jousanghlei Joute, L. Ringum Joute
2012-2017	J.C. Chongkholien	Lienhmingthang	Dr. Thienkhogin, HK Joute, Thanglienthuom, Joseph Lalrothang, Upa Dr. HL Liensang, Zothanglur, L. Remvel, L. Hmingsang Joute, H. Zaneisang, Songneilien Songate
2017-2022	J.C. Chongkholien	L. Hmingsang Joute	Songneilien Songate, Dr. Ginte, HK Joute, Thanglienthuom, Joseph Lalrothang, Dr. HL Liensang, Zothanglur, L. Remvel, L. Rochung, H. Zaneisang,

== Schools ==
- Rengkai Higher Secondary School
- The Pathway School
- Douglas Memorial High School
- Heritage School
- Horeb Academy
- North Eastern Children's Academy

== Churches ==
Rengkai being a Christian-dominant town, there is division based on the denomination of the Church. Classification of the Church is based on their beliefs. The different denominations present within the town are:

- Independent Church of India

The Independent Church of India, or the ICI, is an evangelical church, headquartered in Sielmat, Churachandpur, Manipur, with a mission to 'propagate the Gospel across the Indian sub-continent with a major emphasis on the North Eastern states of India'. It was founded by Watkin Roberts, a Welsh missionary on 5 February 1910 at Senvon village in the southern part of Manipur state, India and is an indigenous, self-supporting, self-propagating and self-governing evangelical church.

The ICI church in Rengkai promulgated at the time of the village's inception, where its initial church members consisted of 10 households with a total strength of 63. The church has now grown to more than 2000 members.

- United Pentecostal Church
- Wesleyan Methodist Church of East India

WMCEI in Rengkai was founded on 6 February 1989 with an initial 63 members from 10 households. The church has now grown to more than 500 members.

- Evangelical Assembly Church

Originally called North East India General Mission, the EAC at Rengkai was established on 1982. The total church members currently exceeds 700 in number.

- Evangelical Free Church of India

The EFCI in Rengkai was established on 3 June 1972. The number of members at present exceeds 1700.

- Rengkai Local Church

Housing more than 250 members, the church settled its name on 10 May 1998 after being previously known as AGMM.

- Assemblies of God Church

The AG Church was established in 1962 at Churachandpur, Manipur.

- Lalsungkuo Unity Church

Established on 29 September 1998, the church is located at Muolhlum, Rengkai with total members greater than 200.

- Reformed Presbyterian Church

RPC church was established at Edenthar, Rengkai by Rev. K. Sanga on 23 April 2003. Now the church houses more than 400 members.

- World Missionary Evangelism

WME church was established on 15 February 1985 with 50 members at the time. Now it holds more than 100 members.

== Bibliography ==
- Churachandpur District Census Handbook (PDF), Directorate of Census Operations, Manipur, 2011
