= Saikawt =

Village in Manipur, India

Saikawt Saikot
- Village
- Location in Manipur, India Saikawt (India)
- Coordinates: 24.33140°N 93.72758°E
- Country: India
- Established: 1919

Population (2011)
  - Total: 2,486.

Languages
  - Official: Hmar
- Time zone: UTC+5:30 (IST)
- PIN: 795143
- Vehicle registration: MN

Saikawt (anglicized: Saikot) is a Hmar village in Churachandpur district, India. Saikawt is a Sub-division and a Block of churachandpur district.

== Miracle Plant of Saikot ==
The Miracle plant of Saikot is a common name given to a shrub (Croton caudatus), which received notability for its 'healing' properties, particularly Cancer, back in 2008. A purported 'founder' of the local 'medicine', Mr. Chawilien, resided in Saikawt (Saikot) hence giving the shrub its name. It is also locally known as 'Cancer Damdawi' (Hmar: Cancer Medicine), 'Chawilien Damdawi', 'Ranlung Damdawi'.

== Governance ==
Saikawt is governed by a Panchayati raj system called 'Saikawt Village Authority' and is chaired by the village's chief. The current chief of the village is James Cole, a Hmar.

Saikot Assembly constituency is named after the village and its incumbent MLA is Paolienlal Haokip.

== Transport ==
Manipur state highway known as 'Sugnu Road' traverses through Saikawt. The village is approximately 2.5 km from the district's HQ, Churachandpur.

== Public Utility ==
Saikawt hosts an annual state-level football tournament, Hmar Martyrs' Trophy, wherein its playground serves as the venue. The village also has a Community Health Centre (CHC).

== Notable people ==
- T. N. Haokip
- Paolienlal Haokip
