= Tuining =

- village
- Interactive map of Tuining
- Country: India
- State: Manipur
- District: Churachandpur

Languages
  - Official: Zou
- Time zone: UTC+5:30 (IST)
- Vehicle registration: MN
- Nearest city: Imphal
- Website: manipur.gov.in

Tuining is a village in Churachandpur district of Manipur, India.
