= Ngaloi =

Coordinates: 24.332°N 93.646°E

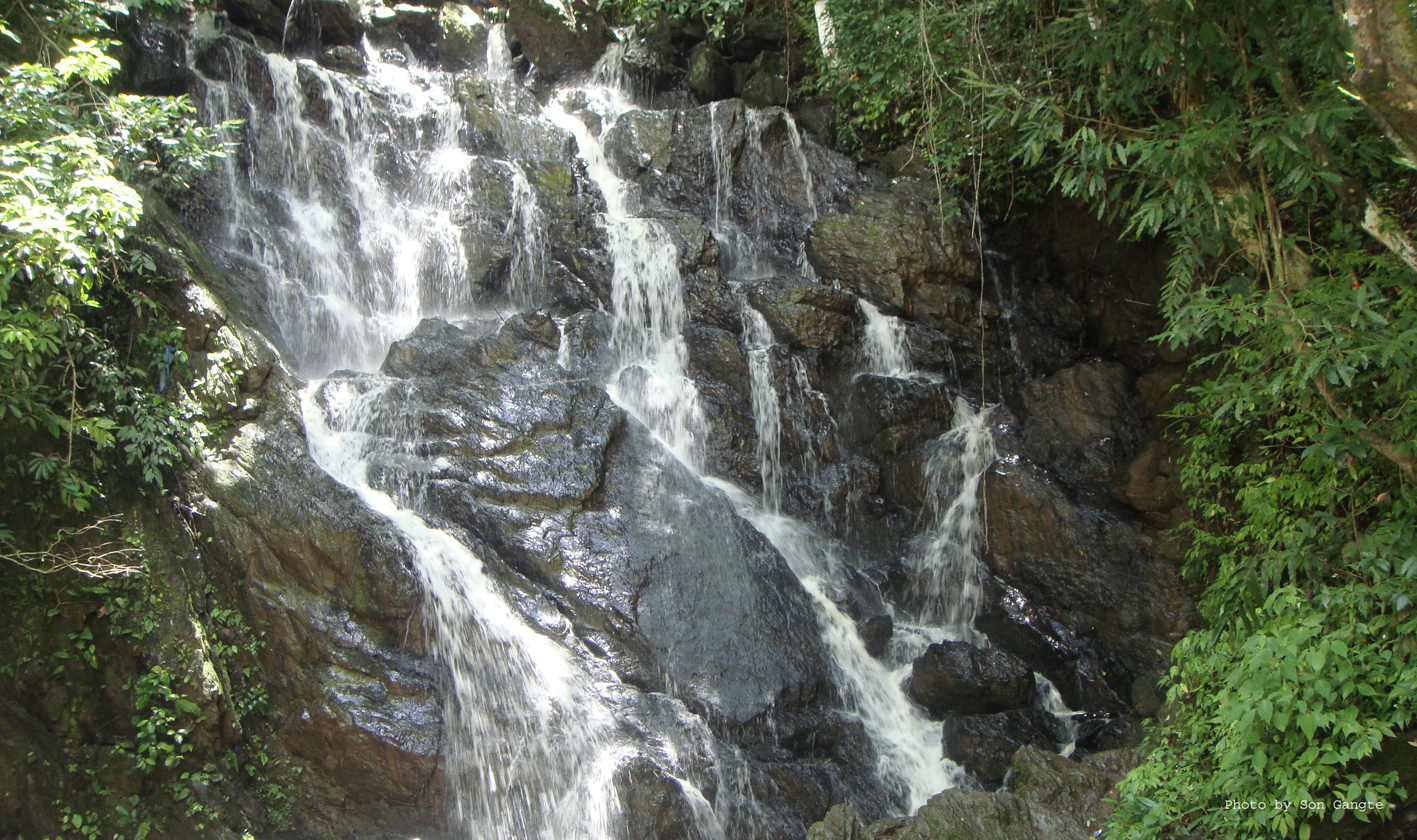
Ngaloi Waterfall

Ngaloi is a village in Churachandpur district, in the Indian state of Manipur. The village is about 9 km from Churachandpur town. Ngaloi Falls is located near the village.

== Village name ==
Ngaloi was formally known as Ngaloimoul.
