= Khopuibung =

Village in Manipur, India

Khawpuibung Khawpuibung
- Village
- Location in Manipur, India Khawpuibung (India)
- Coordinates: 24.319°N 93.737°E
- Country: India

Population (2011)
  - Total: 580

Languages
  - Official: Hmar
- Time zone: UTC+5:30 (IST)
- PIN: 795143
- Vehicle registration: MN

Khawpuibung (anglicized: Kho-pui-bung) is a Hmar village in Churachandpur district, India.
