= Behiang =

Behiang Village
- town
- Location in Manipur, India Behiang Village (India)
- Coordinates: 24.007071°N 93.557675°E
- Country: India
- State: Manipur
- District: Churachanpur District

Languages
  - Official: Zou(Thangkhal) & Paite
- Time zone: UTC+5:30 (IST)
- Vehicle registration: MN

Behiang is a border village in Manipur, India on the boundary with Burma. With roughly 1,000 size population, this village snakes for about 2 kilometres (1.2 mi) along the Tedim road. Majority of the local population belongs to the Zou (Thangkal)

== History of Behiang ==
Tuan Thawng Leivang Ngaihte purchased the Behiang range along with the chieftainship of Behiang village from Langzachin Manlun, chief of Behiang village in 1922 by paying a sum of Rs.100/-(Rupees one hundred) with one Mithun. The then Sub-divisional officer/south West B.C.Gasper approved the transaction of chieftainship from Langzachin Manlun to Tuan Thawng Ngaihte in case No.43/SW of 1922-23 dated 28 January 1923. Further, the Assistant President, Manipur State Darbar (Hill) confirmed B.C.Gasper's order vides case No. 444-South dated 28 January 1923. Behiang village is 24 kilometers away from Singngat sub-divisional headquarters to the south on the Indian - Myanmar border. After the dead of Tuan Thawng Leivang Ngaihte his son Lian Za Mung Leivang Ngaihte became the village chief.

== Successors of Behiang village chief ==
Tuan Thawng Leivang Ngaihte (1922–1957)

Lian Za Mung Leivang Ngaihte (1958–1973)

Lian Za Mung Leivang Ngaihte
Lian Za Mung Leivang Ngaihte died leaving behind his minor son master Thawng Son Mang to succeed his will. But Thawng Son Mang being minor, the Family Household Council (Indongta) members decided that Pau Do Mang, son of Chin Kam, who was the youngest brother of Tuan Thawng Leivang Ngaihte should be the guardian of the minor Thawng Sawm Mang and act as the village chief. Master Thawng Son Mang abdicated the chieftainship by executing a special power of attorney in 1980 under which option was given to him either to remain as chief, or to hand over the chieftainship to Pau Do Mang. Master Thawng Son Mang opted to hand over the chieftainship to Pau Do Mang. Thus, Pau Do Mang became the chief since 1980. The Government of Manipur had given recognition to the chieftainship of Pau Do Mang Leivang Ngaihte vide order by the Governor of Manipur No. CHCH/4/86 date 12.2.2004 published in the Manipur Gazette Extra Ordinary No. 396 date 18.2.2004 and No.CHCH/4/86 (Pt) date 5.12.2006.57.

Pau Do Mang Leivang Ngaihte (1974-till date)

== Ruins of World War II ==
Constructed during World War II, the Tedim road passes through this village, and connects the Indian city of Imphal and the Burmese town of Tedim. A contingent of the Japanese army took this road which was then still under construction. So, the Allied Forces destroyed some bridges on the Tedim road in order to check the advance of the Japanese troops. Ruins of British built bridges still remain near Behiang and surrounding villages like Tonzang and Zangnuam.

== The Old BSF Camp & the New AR Camp, Behiang ==
Behiang used to have a regular camp of India's Border Security Force until recently. The Camp site is located on a lovely and commanding hill lock over the left bank of the Tuivai River overlooking the entire village and a major portion of the international border. The BSF were withdrawn from their camp in December 1998 during the midst of the ethnic clashes between Kuki - Paite tribes.

In June 2006, the Assam Rifles (AR) were stationed in Behiang and they started constructing a new camp site which was officially occupied in January 2008. The AR Camp is currently located on the southern side of the village close to the Khenman boundary.

== Border Trade Centre Approved By Union Government ==
Khenman is the nearest Burmese village from Behiang. For a number of decades, a brisk border trade has been carried out unofficially at this border village. Despite its potential, this bazaar village still lacks the infrastructure to develop into a booming commercial town.

Aimed at boosting the Indo-Myanmar border trade, the Central Government of India had approved the setting up of an Integrated Check Post (ICP) at Behiang on 27 May 2012. On 3 October 2012, the State's Minister of Commerce and Industry, Konthoujam Govindas and the MLA of Singngat, GS Haupu accompanied by officials visited Behiang to ascertain land availability for the construction of the proposed Border Trade Center which is also part of the Union Government's Look East Policy. The visiting team has finalized a land area of 10 acres for the construction of the trade centre.

== Local Economy ==
Behiang has a strong network of mercantile families who live off the Indo-Burma border trade. Several others have family members working in the Indian Army, Para-Military Forces and a few each in the State and Center Govt. service. Yet more than half of the local population engages in agricultural labour - either swidden (jhum) or wet rice cultivation. All arable land along the Tuivai river have been brought under paddy cultivation. Food shortage during the lean season just before harvest usually is met by the surplus rice produced by Burmese jhum farmers.
