= Sielmat =

Village in Churachandpur district, Manipur, India

Sielmat Sielkhawpui
- Village
- Location in Manipur, India Sielmat (India)
- Coordinates: 24.35077°N 93.69676°E
- Country: India
- State: Manipur
- District: Churachandpur district

Population (2011)
  - Total: 1,345

Languages
  - Official: Hmar
- Time zone: UTC+5:30 (IST)
- PIN: 795128
- Vehicle registration: MN

Sielmat is a Hmar village in Churachandpur district, India. The late Indian minister and Bible translator, Rochunga Pudaite, resided here. Sielmat is also the headquarters of the Independent Church of India.

== Institutions ==
- Sielmat Bible College
- Trinity College & Seminary

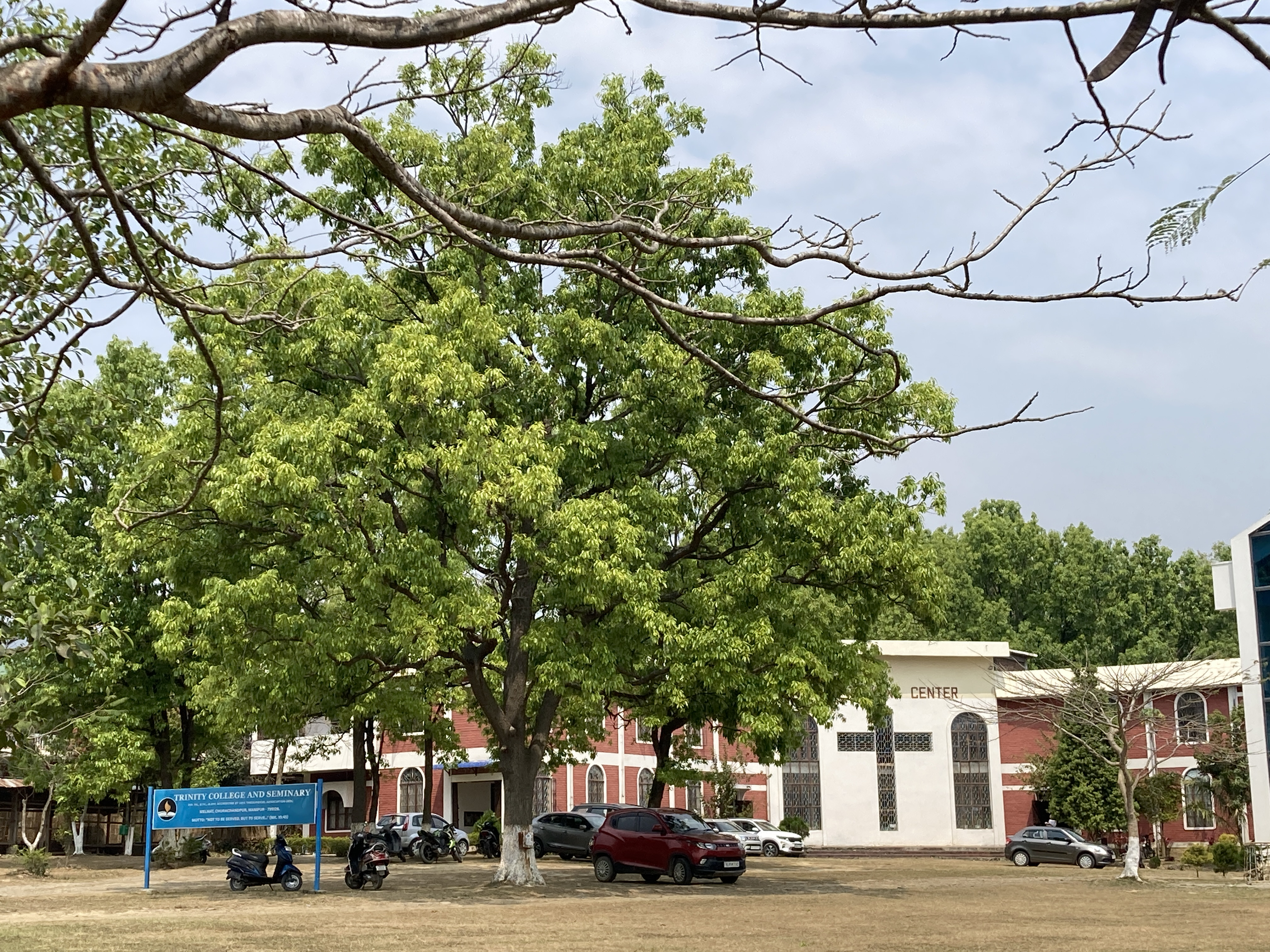
Trinity College & Seminary

- Sielmat Christian Higher Secondary School
- Sielmat Christian Hospital
- Hill Top School

== Churches ==
- Independent Church of India (Roberts Jubilee Chapel)
- Evangelical Free Church of India
