= Tuaitengphai =

Coordinates: 24.303°N 93.730°E

Tuaitengphai is a village in the Churachandpur district of Manipur, India. It has a total population of 310 people, out of which male population is 157 while female population is 153.
