= Bungmual =

Village in Manipur

Coordinates: 24.339°N 93.679°E

Bungmual is a Paite village in a Churachandpur district of Manipur, India. It is further sub-divided into "Veng"(Meaning Village), some of them are Lamlian Veng, Lennuam Veng, Lai Veng, Hausa Veng, Newlane, Colony Veng, Siloam Veng and Zoar Veng,

== Demographics ==
As per the 2011 Census there are 707 houses with a total population of 4441 of which 2167 are males while 2274 are females. Bungmual has a higher literacy rate compared to Manipur. The literacy rate is 93.53% compared to 76.94% of Manipur.

Particulars	Total	Male	Female
Total No. of Houses	707	-	-
Population	4,441	2,167	2,274
Child (0–6)	564	271	293
Schedule Caste	0	0	0
Schedule Tribe	4,420	2,157	2,263
Literacy	93.53 %	96.26 %	90.91 %
Total Workers	1,543	904	639
Main Worker	1,141	-	-
Marginal Worker	402	201	201

== Schools ==
- Hermon English School
- Lalpuithluaii Foundation School
- Kendriya Vidalya
- Dainty Daffodils School

== Post office ==
Bungmual Post Office is a Branch Office. Pin code is 795006 (New Lamka). or 795128 (Churachandpur)
