= Indian Political Department =

Department of British Raj in India

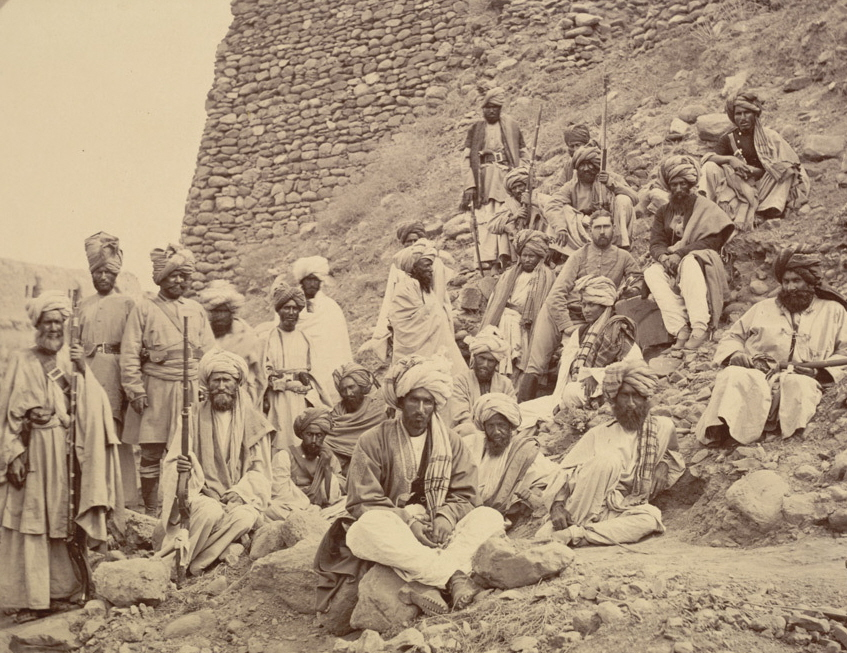
A captain of the Indian Political Department (centre-right) posing with Afghan chiefs at Jamrud Fort, 1878

The Indian Political Department, formerly part of the Foreign and Political Department of the Government of India, was a government department in British India. The department looked after the diplomatic and "political" relations with the subsidiary states of the British Raj in India, and some states overseas. The nature of its work was indirect rule. The department was disbanded at the time of Indian independence and replaced by a newly formed States Department in the Government of India.

== History ==
A department was originally formed under the name "Secret and Political Department" on 23 September 1783, It was created by a resolution of the board of directors of the East India Company; this decreed the creation of a department which could help “relieve the pressure” on the administration of Warren Hastings in conducting its "secret and political business". From 1784 to 1842, the department was divided into three branches: secret, political and foreign.

In 1843, the department was renamed the Foreign Department, and renamed again to Foreign and Political Department in 1914. A post of Political Secretary was created in 1914 as well.

A separate Political Department came into being only in 1937, necessitated by the Government of India Act 1935, which separated the two functions of the Viceroy of India, viz., Governor-General (for the administration of British India) and Crown Representative (for the supervision of the princely states). A fresh post of Political Advisor to the Crown Representative was created, with a cabinet rank. The post-holder headed the Political Department. Sir Conrad Corfield was the last person to hold this post before Indian independence.

== Staff ==
The staff employed by the IPD, known as the Indian Political Service, were generally referred to as political officers, and were recruited from four areas:

- Two thirds were recruited from the Indian Army
- Next most numerous were those recruited from the Indian Civil Service
- Some came from the Indian Medical Service
- Some came from the Indian Public Works and Engineering Department

All members of the IPS were seconded from their original service and were subject to their original service's pension and retirement rules. The IPS was allowed to recruit two ICS officers every year, which was reduced to one every fifth year. On the Army side, four or five Indian Army officers were recruited on alternate years. When the process of Indianisation reached the IPS, some were also recruited from the Provincial Civil Services and services connected with the frontier.

Employees of the political service were predominantly European, although small numbers of Indians were employed. In 1947 it had a staff of 170 officers, of which 124 were serving. They included seventeen Indians – twelve Muslims, four Hindus and one Sikh.

The political officers attached to individual states were called Political Agents or Residents, the latter rank being limited to large states like Hyderabad and Jammu and Kashmir (typically "salute states"). The large states had full legislative and judicial powers, and the role of residents would tend to be mainly diplomatic. In smaller states, some of the legislative and judicial functions would be carried out under the guidance of the political agents, or directly by them. In addition, the rank of Agent to the Governor-General (AGG) or Agent to the Crown Representative was used for officers in charge of collections of states in a region, which were then called Agencies. An Agency might have several Political Agents or assistants attached to it, reporting to the AGG.

The powers and duties of the political officers varied widely and were often left to the discretion of the officers themselves. They were also subject to the policies of the Viceroy in power, who might be interventionist or generous.

== Bibliography ==
- Chudgar, P. L. (1929), Indian Princes under British Protection, London: Williams & Norgate Ltd. – via archive.org
- Coen, Sir Terence Creagh (1971). The Indian Political Service: A Study in Indirect Rule. London: Chatto & Windus. ISBN 0-7011-1579-3 – via archive.org.
