= Singngat =

- Mini-Town
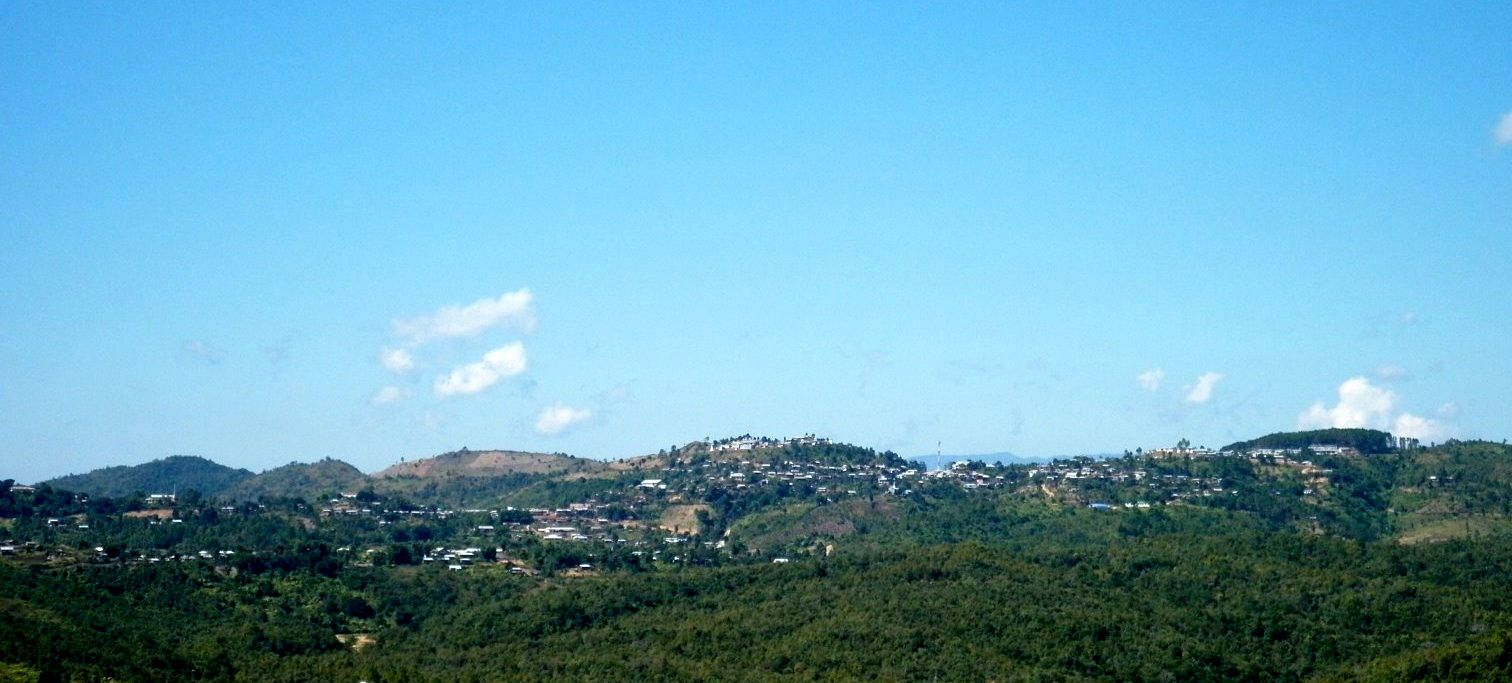
- Interactive map of Singngat
- Location in Manipur, India Singngat (India)
- Coordinates: 24.1424°N 93.5918°E
- State: Manipur
- District: Churachandpur

Population (2011)
  - Total: 3,778

Language(s)
  - Official: Meitei (officially called Manipuri) (Note: Meitei language (officially known as Manipuri language) is the official language of Manipur. Other regional languages of different places in Manipur may either be predominantly spoken or not in their respective places but "Meitei" is always officially used.)
  - Regional: Paite, Zou, Simte, Kuki
- Time zone: UTC+5:30 (IST)
- PIN: 795139
- Telephone code: 3852
- Vehicle registration: MN

Singngat, also spelt Singhat, is one of the sub-divisional headquarters of Churachandpur district in the Indian state of Manipur and is a key administrative centre in the southwestern border of the state. The Manipur Government officially recorded the name as Singhat, that's because the Meiteis find it difficult to pronounce the original name.

== Border Model Town ==
Thanks to efforts by the powers that be, Singngat has been part of a military and civilian partnership that seeks to redevelop it as a Model Town.

== Lifelines ==
=== Drinking Water ===
Water scarcity has been grappling the people of Singngat since time immemorial. People have to undergo tremendous hardships in fetching water to as far away a tiny stream at over one to two kilometers, everyday, which sometimes is just barely a trickle from a small rivulet. To address the issue of perennial scarcity of drinking water, certain initiatives had been undertaken in the past. These are as follows:

1980s: An earthen dam was constructed by Pu Gougin, the then MLA at Paldai which soon proved to be a dismal failure.

1990s: With aid from an UN agency, an underground water pump scheme was initiated. It made water available for everyday use and was a great success. Sadly, most of the equipments were damaged during 1997-98 ethnic conflict. No such activity has been undertaken since then and the free and abundant availability of clean drinking water remains a distant dream for the town's inhabitants.

2006-07: An amount of Rs. 16 Lakh was sanctioned for water harvesting scheme under the MCA project. The system works only during the rainy season. A few old tanks are the only existing testimony to this scheme.

2009-10: A sum of Rs. 204.64 lakhs was sanctioned by the Ministry of Development of North Eastern Region for the augmentation of water supply in Singngat for the period 2009–2010. This project was sanctioned on 20 July 2009 and according to the Detailed Project Report submitted by PHED, Churachandpur Division obtained from DONER, the source of water will be Tuisum river, 8 km from Singngat town. Work was started and the project was supposed to be completed by July 2011.

== Politics ==
Singngat is part of Outer Manipur (Lok Sabha constituency). It consists of Singngat (Singhat) Sub-division. Elected Members of Manipur Legislative Assembly from Singngat constituency since 1977 are as follows:

1. Thangkhanlal INC(I) 1980
2. T Gouzadou INC 1984
3. Thangkhanlal KNA 1990
4. T Gouzadou NPP 1995
5. N Zatawn JD(U) 2000
6. Thangso Baite MSCP 2002
7. T Hangkhanpao NPP 2007
8. Ginsuanhau Zou INC 2012
9. Ginsuanhau Zou BJP 2017
10. Chinlunthang Zou KPA 2022

== Singngat Vision 2020 ==
With a sense of deep concern on the current state of affairs, the collective leaderships of Team Delhi, Team Shillong, Team Lamka, Team Imphal, Team Singngat, etc. have painstaking deliberations on the issue. The collective leadership, thereupon, unanimously resolved to adopt a vision document "Singngat Vision – 2020" with a pledge to strive towards achieving the points given therein. The Vision is expected to be attained by 2020.
