= Tiddim Road =

Historical military road in India

The Tiddim Road (Tedim Road) is a historical road from Imphal, Manipur, India, to Tedim (Tiddim) in Chin Hills of Myanmar. It remains as a road connecting to highways today.

== Historical significance ==
Tiddim Road is around 265 kilometres (165 miles) long, starting from Imphal, running through Bishnupur and Churachandpur before terminating at Tedim, in Myanmar. The road runs through strategic valleys and forested hills, and was an essential military supply and retreat route during the Burma Campaign in World War II. The other key invasion route was the Kohima Road.

== Significance during World War II ==
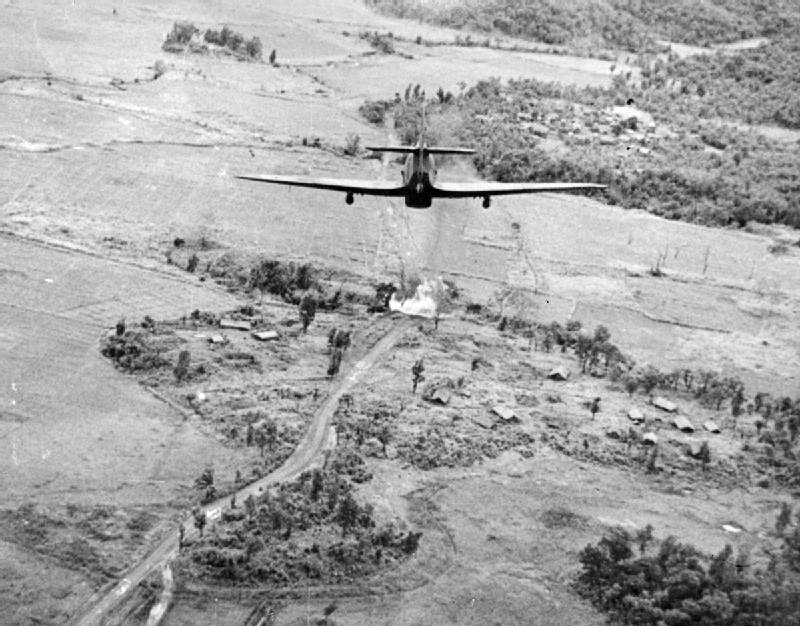
Hawker Hurricane Attack bridge in a Burmese settlement near Tiddim Road.

=== Japanese invasion ===
The Tiddim Road was the only southern invasion route for the Japanese 33rd Division during the Battle of Imphal (March–July 1944) under Operation U-Go. The Japanese troops had advanced from the Chin Hills region of Burma and moved north along Tiddim Road toward Imphal.

The capture of Milestone 109, perhaps the most significant strategic point along the route, occurred in early 1944 and cut off the rear supply line of Allied 17th Indian Division. The Japanese then established a large supply dump at Milestone 109, which was bombed heavily by the Royal Air Force.

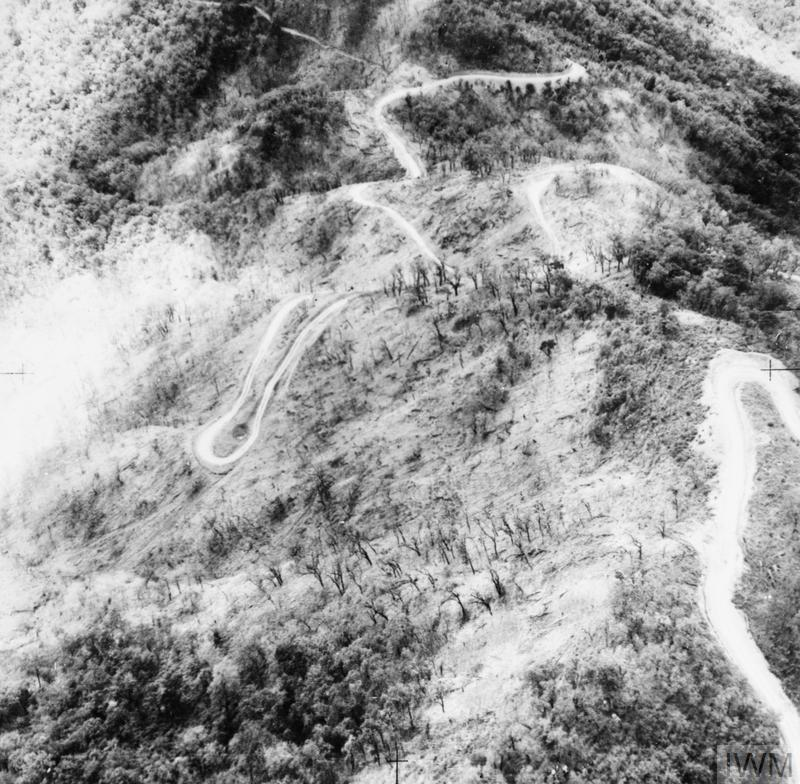
Milestone 109 where the Japanese cut the road behind the 17th Indian Division in March 1944 and where they subsequently established a supply dump which was heavily bombed by the RAF.

=== Allied defense and withdrawal ===
Tiddim Road saw bitter fighting as British and Indian forces tried to slow the Japanese invasion. The 17th Indian Infantry Division was able to make a fighting withdrawal, pulling back along Tiddim Road toward Imphal, while trying to slow the Japanese advance. Fighting at Bishnupur, Potsangbam and Nambol all occurred in this sector.

== Film and photographic documentation ==
Several films and photographic records from the war - held at the Imperial War Museums - document operations along the Tiddim Road including:

- Vehicle recovery, bridging, and resupply efforts by Allied engineers.
- Engineering workshops and field repairs made by the Indian troops
- Indian Mountain Artillery using mules and gun carriages to navigate hilly terrain.

== Cultural memory and tourism ==
Tiddim Road, a stretch close to Imphal, is now part of history battlefield tours. On this stretch of road there is Maibam Lokpa Ching (Red Hill), a site about 16 km south of Imphal, which is also currently a war memorial maintained by the government of Japan and the state of Manipur.

Many organized battlefield tours now line the mile of the road in order to visit the significant wartime sites and view those significant sites within the Imphal Campaign.
