= Churachandpur district =

- District
- Location of Churachandpur district in Manipur
- Interactive map of Churachandpur district
- Coordinates: 24.3466°N 93.6986°E
- Country: India
- State: Manipur
- Headquarters: Churachandpur

Area
  - Total: 2,392 km^{2} (924 sq mi)
  - Rank: 2
- Elevation (District headquarters): 914.4 m (3,000 ft)

Population (2011)
  - Total: 300,000+
  - Density: 59/km^{2} (150/sq mi)
  - Percent of state: 9.97%

Literacy (2001)
  - Literacy Rate: 84.29% (Rank 2/9)
  - Literacy by gender: Male 88.34%; Female 80.13%

Language(s)
  - Official: Meitei (Manipuri) (Note: Meitei language (officially known as Manipuri language) is the official language of Manipur. Other regional languages of different places in Manipur may either be predominantly spoken or not in their respective places but "Meitei" is officially used.)
  - Regional: Kuki-Chin
- Time zone: UTC+5:30 (IST)
- PIN: 795128, 795006
- Telephone code: 03874
- Vehicle registration: MN 02
- Website: churachandpur.nic.in

Churachandpur district (Meitei pronunciation: /tʃʊraːˌtʃaːnɗpʊr/), is one of the 16 districts of the Indian state of Manipur populated mainly by Kuki-Zo people. The name honours former Maharaja Sir Churachand Singh of Manipur. The district headquarters is located in the Churachandpur town, which is also locally known by the name Lamka.

The Churachandpur district first came into being as the South-West Area hill subdivision of Manipur in 1919. It soon acquired the name "Churachandpur subdivision" based on its headquarters at Songpi, which was also called "Churachandpur". After the independence of India, it remained one of the eight subdivisions of Manipur. A "New Churachandpur" town was built at the present location to serve as its headquarters. In 1969, the subdivision was upgraded to a district, initially called "Manipur South" and later "Churachandpur district". In 2016, the western part of the district consisting of the Tipaimukh and Thanlon subdivisions has been made a separate district called Pherzawl, and the rump territory remains Churachandpur district.

== Geography ==
2011 district map of Manipur; the Churachandpur district was divided into the present Churachandpur district and Pherzawl district in 2016

As per the 2011 census, the Churachandpur district covered an area of 4,520 square kilometres (1,750 sq mi) at the south-western part of the Manipur state. At that time, the Tipaimukh and Thanlon subdivisions were part of the district, which are now separated into the Pherzawl district. The two districts together form the jurisdiction of the Churachandpur Autonomous District Council (ADC).

=== Census towns ===
There are three census towns in Churachandpur District:

- Rengkai
- Zenhang Lamka
- Hill town

=== Villages ===
- B.Aijalon
- Ngaloi
- New Lamka
- Bungmual
- Henglep
- Hiangtam Lamka
- Kangvai
- Peniel
- Saikawt
- Sielmat
- Singngat
- Tuibong

== Demographics ==
Historical population
Year	Pop.	±%
1951	44,496	—
1961	66,304	+49.0%
1971	100,418	+51.5%
1981	134,494	+33.9%
1991	176,184	+31.0%
2001	227,905	+29.4%
2011	274,143	+20.3%
2011 Churachandpur district (includes present Pherzawl district); Source: Census of India

As of the 2011 Census of India, Churachandpur district had a population of 274,143, This gives it a ranking of 575th in India (out of a total of 640 districts). It has a population density of 60 inhabitants per square kilometre (160/sq mi). Its population growth rate over the decade 2001–2011 was 20.29%. Churachandpur has a sex ratio of 975 females for every 1000 males, and a literacy rate of 84.29%. Most of the people who live in the district are Kuki-Zo people. The composition of scheduled tribes in the 2011 district is as follows:

	Population	Percentage of Total Pop.
All Scheduled Tribes	254,787	92.9%
Kuki-Zo tribes (Note: The Kuki-Zo tribes include Gangte, Hmar, Paite, Simte, Sukte, Thadou, Vaiphei, Zou, and some smaller tribes designated as "Any Kuki" and "Any Lushai (Mizo)".)	238,547	87.0%
Naga tribes (Note: The Naga tribes include Angami, Kabui, Kacha Naga, Mao, Maram, Poumai, Sema and Tangkhul.)	1,148	1.1%
Old Kuki/Naga (Note: The Old Kuki tribes retaining the Kuki classification include: Aimol, Chiru, Kom, Koireng, Kharam, and Ralte. The tribes under the Naga umbrella include: Anal, Chothe, Koirao, Lamkang, Maring, Moyon, Monsang, Purum and Tarao.)	7,716	2.8%

Apart from the scheduled tribes, the district is populated by Meities, Nepalese, Biharis, Marwaris, and Punjabis, amounting to roughly 7% of the population.

Christianity is the majority religion (93%) in Churachandpur. Hinduism is the second largest (4%) religion. Then there are followers of Islam (1%), Sikh, Buddhist, Jain and other religions.

== Educational facilities ==
=== Colleges ===
- Churachandpur Medical College, Hiangtam Lamka
- Churachandpur Government College, Hiangtam Lamka
- Lamka College, New Lamka

==== Private Colleges ====
- Rayburn College
- VK Tawna College
- Bethany Christian College

==== Theological Colleges ====
- Evangelical College of Theology, Nehru Marg
- Trinity College of Seminary, Sielmat
- Sielmat Bible College, Sielmat
- Grace Bible College, New Lamka

=== Private Universities ===
- Sangai International University, Rengkai Road

== Health ==
District Hospital Churachandpur is located within Churachandpur town. Initially, it was a dispensary with few staffs and in the year 1968, it became a 50 bedded Civil Hospital which was inaugurated by Shri Baleswar Prasad, Chief Commissioner of Manipur on 8 June 1968. The hospital was extended with another 50 bedded new building inaugurated on 17 May 1985 by the Medical Minister Shri T. Phungzathang Tonsing and became a 100 bedded one. The present Building OPD block was inaugurated on 31 May 2002, O.T wing on 23 December 2013, and the Trauma Centre on 19 July 2014 by the Hon'ble Chief Minister in presence of the Health Minister and the Industries Minister. The Government of Manipur approved upgrading the hospital to a 200 bedded ward and started the process of making it a Hill Medical College under the leadership of Hon'ble Medical Minister.

== Economy ==
Khuga Dam in 2006

In 2006, the Ministry of Panchayati Raj named Churachandpur one of the country's most impoverished districts (out of a total of 640). It is one of the three districts in Manipur currently receiving funds from the Backward Regions Grant Fund (BRGF).

== Climate ==
The location is north of Tropic of Cancer in northern hemisphere, it has summer season in March, April and May with warm, hot and sunny weather. Rainy season starts April and last till October. The winter season is cool and dry.

Climate data for Churachandpur
Month	Jan	Feb	Mar	Apr	May	Jun	July	Aug	Sep	Oct	Nov	Dec
High °C	27	28	36	36	34	39	37	39	38	34	32	28
Low °C	7	4	14	18	21	22	24	25	22	19	16	8

== Transportation ==
=== Airport ===
Nearest airport from Churachandpur is Imphal Airport at Imphal which is about 60 km. However, during the 2023 Manipur violence, Imphal Airport was considered dangerous for some, and so the alternative route out was a 380 km, 14-hour drive to Aizawl.

== Media ==
Major private television channels/cables are :

• Angels Vision Digital Cable

• Hornbill Cable Network

• Skynet

• TC Network

• Tullou TV.

== Government, Politics and Administration ==
Administration is carried out by the Deputy Commissioners or District Magistrates with support of the District level officer and Block Development officers. The district collector office is located at Tuibong Town.

The administrative setup of Churachandpur District.

1. Sub Divisions & Blocks
2. Autonomous District Councils
3. Towns
4. Police Stations
5. Assembly Constituencies

=== Autonomous district council ===
At the district level, there is the Churachandpur Autonomous District Council created by "The Manipur (Hill Areas) District Council Act, 1971," passed by the Parliament of India. The Autonomous District Council is to administer areas which have been given autonomy within the states under Manipur (Hill Areas) District Councils Act, 1971. In accordance with this Act, the Autonomous (Hill) District Council is empowered to maintain and manage of property: movable and immovable, and institutions under their jurisdiction. Churachandpur Autonomous District Council has 24 constituencies.

== See also ==
- List of populated places in Churachandpur district

== Bibliography ==
- "Comprehensive details about Manipur State and its Environmental & Social Sensitivities" (PDF). Government of Manipur. March 2015. Archived (PDF) from the original on 10 September 2020.
- Churachandpur District Census Handbook (PDF), Directorate of Census Operations, Manipur, 2001
- Churachandpur District Census Handbook (PDF), Directorate of Census Operations, Manipur, 2011
- Manipur Administrative Atlas (PDF), Census of India, Government of India, 2005
- Chishti, S. M. A. W. (1979). Political Development in Manipur, 1919–1949 (PDF) (PhD thesis). Aligarh Muslim University – via core.ac.uk.
  - Chishti, S. M. A. W. (2005), Political Development in Manipur, 1919–1949, Gyan Publishing House, ISBN 978-81-7835-424-8
- Pau, Pum Khan (2019), Indo-Burma Frontier and the Making of the Chin Hills: Empire and Resistance, Taylor & Francis, ISBN 9781000507454
- Puia, Roluah (2021), "When boundaries matter: land, laws and territorial conflict in Manipur, Northeast India", in Kedilezo Kikhi; Dharma Rakshit Gautam (eds.), Comprehending Equity, Taylor & Francis, pp. 98–, doi:10.4324/9781003182726-8, ISBN 9781003182726, S2CID 238794539 – via Academia.edu
- Ibochou Singh, Khwairakpam (1985). British administration in Manipur 1891–1947. University (PhD thesis). Gauhati University. hdl:10603/66697 – via Shodhganga.
