= Christian persecution in Manipur =

Religious persecution in the Indian state of Manipur

Persecution of Christians in Manipur refers to religious violence, pressure to convert, and social exclusion directed at Christian communities in the Indian state of Manipur.. It is closely entangled with the state's ethnic divisions between the predominantly Hindu Meitei people of the Imphal Valley and the largely Christian Kuki-Zo and Naga communities of the surrounding hill districts. Commentators have differed over how far the 2023–2025 Manipur violence was ethnic and how far religious, but several observers and rights groups have described an overtly religious dimension, and have linked it to the growth of Hindutva politics and a revival of the Meitei indigenous religion Sanamahism. During the violence that began in May 2023, hundreds of churches were burned or damaged and tens of thousands of Christians were displaced, and rights groups and Christian organisations reported cases of coerced conversion to Sanamahism.

== Background ==
=== Demographics ===
Manipur state is split almost evenly between Hinduism and Christianity. The 2011 Census of India counted roughly 2.86 million people in the state, out of which 41.39% Hindu, 41.29% Christian. The Meitei people form the majority and live mainly in the Imphal Valley, a lowland pocket that covers about 10% of the state's total land area. The rest of Manipur, the hill districts, is home to the Kuki-Zo and Naga tribal communities. These groups are overwhelmingly Christian. Among Manipur's Christians, the Baptist tradition is the most common, followed by Presbyterianism and Roman Catholicism. A smaller but significant portion of Meitei have also converted to Christianity. With an estimated 300,000 members, Meitei Christians have been described as a "minority within a minority."

=== Historical context ===
Christianity arrived in Manipur through the Anglican missionary William Pettigrew, who came in 1894 working with the American Baptist Foreign Mission Society. The first Meitei convert is traditionally said to be Angom Porom Singh of Phayeng, baptised around 1896. A competing account credits Ningol Kaboklei, who may have met missionaries in Sylhet as early as 1893. Missionary activity expanded rapidly through the hill communities over the 20th century. By the 2011 census, Christians made up 97% of Manipur's Scheduled Tribe population.

The colonial period left a lasting imprint on ethnic relations. After the Anglo-Manipur War of 1891 the British took direct control of the hill areas. They tightened their grip further after the Kuki Rebellion of 1917 to 1919. When India gained independence, the hill tribes received Scheduled Tribe status under the constitution. That gave them protections over land ownership in tribal areas. Those protections remain a source of tension to this day.

=== Rise of Hindu nationalism and Sanamahi revivalism ===
Hindu nationalist organisations, such as the Rashtriya Swayamsevak Sangh (RSS) and the Bharatiya Janata Party (BJP), which had spent decades building a presence in northeast India. The RSS runs a network of Ekal Vidyalaya schools across the region. In many cases they had pushed for Scheduled Tribe status to be stripped from tribals who did not return to their indigenous faiths or Hinduism. After the BJP took power in Manipur in 2017 under N. Biren Singh, the administration started pushing this narrative that christians should no longer retain the Scheduled tribe status

During this same time, Sanamahism, which is the pre-Hindu indigenous religion of the Meitei, went through a significant revival. Herein, two organisations namely Arambai Tenggol and Meitei Leepun, the drove the revival the most aggressively. Both groups from the onset had framed the growth of Christianity as a direct threat to Meitei identity. Arambai Tenggol was founded by Manipur's titular king and Rajya Sabha member Leishemba Sanajaoba. Its founding oath-taking ceremony, held in September 2022 at Sanajaoba's residence, was conducted under Sanamahi rites. Journalists and rights groups have described it as an armed militia. Chief Minister N. Biren Singh gave the group political backing.

== Persecution before 2023 ==
=== Anti-conversion pressures ===
In the years before the 2023 violence, the Meitei Christians had faced a steady communal pressure to abandon their faith from extremist organizations like the Arambai Tenggol. Manipur was among the Indian states considering anti-conversion laws, which restrict conversions carried out through alleged "force, fraud, or allurement."

In April 2023, which was weeks before the major outbreak of violence, Arambai Tenggol activists had stormed into the home of Meitei Christian pastor Takhellambam Ramananda in Imphal. They accused him of making blasphemous remarks against Sanamahism and threatened assault on his children if he did not comply. The incident followed a public threat wherein the titular king Leishemba Sanajaoba had publicly made imflamotory post against the pastor on social media. On 11 April 2023, the ruling BJP demolished three churches in Imphal's Tribal Colony area. The demolitions by the Meitei Christian Association sharply heightened tensions.

== 2023–2025 Manipur violence ==
Full scale violence had broke out across Manipur on 3 May 2023. Tribal communities initially marched into the protest against the Manipur High Court order, issued on 20 April, which had recommended the Scheduled Tribe status be granted to the Meitei despite them being the ruling elite. Tribal groups feared this would let the Meitei purchase land in constitutionally protected hill areas, wiping out protections that had been in place since independence. The All-Tribal Students Union Manipur (ATSUM) organised a "Tribal Solidarity March." Counter-rallies and blockades by Meitei groups quickly spiralled out of control.

The destruction was staggering. By the evening of the 3rd of May, mobs started burning churches in Imphal. In addition to all this, a crowd estimated at over 2,000 raided the police armouries and Manipur Rifles camps, looted the weapons, and turned on Christians in the neighbourhoods across the city. By early 2026, government figures place the official death toll above 260. Alongside this, an estimated 1,500 people were injured and about 70,000 were displaced. Police also recorded an additional 4,786 houses which were set on fire and about 386 religious structures that were vandalised.

=== Destruction of churches ===
Churches had been the primary target since the initial hours. The Catholic Archbishop of Imphal, Dominic Lumon, had reported that 249 churches had burned within 36 hours of the violence starting. The Churachandpur district Christians Goodwill Council also documented over 150 church properties, across 15 denominations, to be either burned, demolished, or vandalised by 10 May 2023. The hardest-hit here, was the Manipur Presbyterian Singlup, which had lost 39 churches in just three days, between 4 and 6 May. The Evangelical Churches Association and the Manipur Presbyterian Church Synod each lost about 14 churches.

The United States Commission on International Religious Freedom (USCIRF) confirmed that more than 250 churches of various denominations were burned or damaged across the state. In September 2023, nineteen independent experts attached to the United Nations Human Rights Council cited the destruction of over 253 churches and 1,700 homes in a formal appeal to the Indian government.

=== Targeting of Christians across ethnic lines ===
Much of the world reported the conflict as an ethnic clash. But a number of observers pointed to a distinctly religious dimension. Christians from the Meitei community itself, not only Kuki-Zo tribals, came under attack. This suggested that faith, not just ethnicity, drove some of the violence. A human rights lawyer working with ADF International documented cases in which a Meitei Christian family's home burned while their non-Christian neighbour's property next door was left untouched.

Members of Arambai Tenggol and Meitei Leepun attacked and vandalised Meitei Christian churches in the Imphal Valley. Meitei pastors described being beaten, threatened with death, and forced to flee the state. Some Meitei organisations, including the Meitei Christian Churches Council (MCCC), tried to blame the destruction of Meitei Christian properties entirely on Kuki-Zo attackers. Archbishop Lumon and independent journalists disputed this account.

=== Forced conversions ===
In the months after the initial violence, Meitei Christians in the valley faced sustained pressure to renounce their faith. Pastors described being summoned by Arambai Tenggol and Meitei Leepun activists, backed by village committees, and ordered to abandon Christianity. According to multiple sources, the process demanded that individuals personally burn the Bible, strip their homes of all Christian symbols, and sign a legal affidavit declaring their conversion to Sanamahism.

Multiple pastors who declined to sign conversion affidavits reported mob beatings, vandalised homes, and death threats. Some were coerced into publicly worshipping Sanamahi deities while privately holding to their Christian faith. Others simply fled the state.

In April 2024, a Sanamahi flag was hoisted atop a crucifix at St. George Catholic Prayer Mount in Sugnu. The Senapati District Catholic Union condemned the act.

=== Restriction of worship ===
After the initial violence, Christians in Meitei-majority areas of the Imphal Valley were barred from holding prayer fellowships, even in private homes. Church services were suspended across the valley. Some pastors kept prayer meetings going by telephone conference call. Christians also lost social standing within their own communities.

== Humanitarian impact ==
The violence has displaced an estimate of 60,000 to around 70,000 people. A significant number of this were Kuki-Zo Christians. Displaced Christians who were sheltered in relief camps reported severely lacking adequate food, medicine, and hygiene supplies. Medical care for tribal Christians was also severely restricted and Meitei Christians were denied aid for being Christian. The administration in the capital of Imphal, which also became a Meitei-controlled zone, severely restricted meitei christians from receiving basic services. Additionally, many were instructed to report their own family members who were Christian so that action could be taken against them, for practicing the faith.

Around 4,000 school-age children were also caught up in the crisis and many meitei children were asked by teachers to renounced their faith. In the Churachandpur and Bishnupur districts alone, roughly 1,000 children were left without homes. Reports of severe psychological trauma, especially among children, were widespread.

On 20 December 2023, a mass burial was held for 87 Kuki Christians killed in the violence.

== Debate over characterisation ==
Whether the Manipur conflict is primarily ethnic or primarily religious remains contested. Some analysts and politicians, including members of the BJP government, insisted it was a purely ethnic clash between the Meitei and Kuki-Zo, with no meaningful religious dimension.

Others pushed back. Archbishop Lumon, a Meitei himself had also pointed to the attacks on Meitei Christian churches and pastors as evidence that religion, not only ethnicity, was at play. Writing in Foreign Policy in August 2023, journalist Ravi Agarwal additionally had observed that this conflict carried clear religious undertones with consequences for India's pluralist democracy.

Further, a researcher at Open Doors' World Watch unit offered a more nuanced reading. In the early stages, Kuki churches were targeted while Naga churches were spared. That pattern suggested ethnicity, not religion alone, was the initial driver. But the researcher warned the violence could escalate into broader religious persecution.

International Christian Concern described the conflict as "ethnoreligious." Dozens of Meitei-owned churches were among those destroyed by Meitei attackers. The organisation argued that mobs were targeting communities on the basis of faith as well as ethnicity.

== International responses ==
In September 2023, nineteen independent experts attached to the United Nations Human Rights Council formally appealed to the Indian government. They expressed alarm at the continuing violence and noted that Christians from both the Kuki and Meitei communities had been disproportionately affected. The experts said the violence appeared to have been preceded and incited by hate speech against the Kuki ethnic minority, targeting them for their ethnicity and religion alike.

Human Rights Watch called on Indian authorities to investigate impartially, citing allegations that police had sided with the Meitei. The Manipur police however denied having any bias. The United Nations High Commissioner for Human Rights Volker Türk, further also urged the Indian government to investigate and address the root causes of the violence. Following this in July 2023, the European Parliament passed a resolution which urged India to restore peace in Manipur while expressing concern about politically motivated, and divisive policies promoting Hindu majoritarianism.

Alongside this, the USCIRF has also recommended that the Indian state be designated a Country of Particular Concern every since the year 2020, citing the cases of systematic and egregious violations of religious freedom. The organisation highlighted the Manipur violence in its monitoring reports.

The Evangelical Fellowship of India (EFI) filed a petition at the Supreme Court of India calling for an agency to monitor anti-Christian attacks. The EFI argued such attacks had grown widespread since 2021, a period that coincided with a wave of new anti-conversion laws.

== Indian government response ==
The central government deployed additional security forces and assigned a security adviser to the chief minister. The state government imposed curfews, issued shoot-on-sight orders in certain areas, and suspended internet services. Human rights organisations condemned the internet suspension.

The BJP eventually paid a political price as at the 2024 Indian general election, the party lost both Manipur Lok Sabha seats to the Indian National Congress. In early 2025, Kuki civil groups had also submitted audio recordings to the Supreme Court of India alleging that Chief Minister N. Biren Singh had personally incited violence. The independent news site The Wire confirmed the recordings' date, subject matter, and content and attributed it to the Chief Minister. Biren Singh has since resigned on 9 February 2025. President's rule was imposed under Article 356 of the Constitution of India on 13 February 2025. President's rule officially came to an end on 4 February 2026, when Yumnam Khemchand Singh was sworn in as the new Chief Minister.

== See also ==
- 2023–2025 Manipur violence
- Christianity in Manipur
- Meitei Leepun
- Persecution of Christians in India
- Anti-conversion laws in India
- Religious violence in India
- Kuki people
