= Manipur tapes =

Controversial audio recording attributed to Manipur politician

In June 2024, an unnamed individual or individuals created an audio recording of an alleged closed-door conversation between N. Biren Singh – the Chief Minister of the Indian state of Manipur – and his associates, and leaked it to the government-appointed Commission of Inquiry for Manipur Violence. In it, Singh is heard taking responsibility for starting the "war", a reference to the still-ongoing ethnic conflict that had erupted in the state in 2023 between the Meitei and Kuki-Zo communities. In August 2024, clips from the recording were circulated on social media and went viral, becoming known as the Manipur tapes. The Kuki Students' Organisation shared a transcript of excerpts from the recording in a press release, and the news portal The Wire published a series of articles about the tapes.

The Government of Manipur responded to the audio clips on social media, claiming that they were "doctored" and threatening that those involved in their circulation would be "prosecuted under relevant provisions of law". The Kuki Organisation for Human Rights submitted transcripts of the tapes to the Supreme Court-appointed investigating officer and the National Human Rights Commission, urging an investigation of Singh. Subsequently, in October 2024, it filed a writ petition in the Supreme Court of India asking for a court-monitored investigation. After an initial hearing on 8 November, it submitted a forensic report from Truth Labs, which assessed that the voice in the recording belonged to Singh with 93% certainty. Five days later, Singh resigned as chief minister, and the state was put under President's rule. Even after year's worth of proceedings in the Supreme Court, no progress has been made in the case, as the government, while objecting to the Truth Labs as a "private organisation", refrained from getting the audio recording analysed in its own laboratories. Biren Singh has not commented on the matter, saying that it was sub judice.

== Context ==
The districts of Manipur as of 2011. The four central districts, Imphal East, Imphal West, Thoubal and Bishnupur, comprise the Imphal Valley. The remaining districts represent hill areas.

On 3 May 2023, after a protest rally in Churachandpur Town by Kuki-Zo tribals against a Meitei demand for Scheduled Tribe (ST) status, ethnic violence between the Meitei and Kuki-Zo communities erupted near the border between Churachandpur and Bishnupur districts. It quickly spiralled out of control, with 77 Kuki and 10 Meitei people killed within a week and over 60,000 displaced. The entire Kuki-Zo population living in the central valley was evicted from their homes, and all Meitei people living in Kuki-dominated hill districts were likewise displaced, resulting in a complete partition of the state along communal lines.

According to the Kuki Organisation for Human Rights (KOHUR), the violence was started at the behest of Manipur Chief Minister N. Biren Singh, who belongs to the majority Meitei community. The organisation states that on the same day as the tribal rally, talks were ongoing between the Kuki-Zo militant groups under Suspension of Operations ("SoO groups") and the Union government. The talks arrived at an agreement, which was to be finalised on 8 May 2023. Upon hearing the outcome, KOHUR's sources said that Singh became furious and told his associates that he was going to start a war against the Kukis.

Throughout the 20-month-long conflict, state complicity was widely alleged. Armed militias Arambai Tenggol and Meitei Leepun launched attacks on Kuki-Zo people; according to All India Lawyers Association For Justice, they did so with impunity under state patronage. The state police were seen to be acting as an 'ethnic army', using state resources against the Kuki-Zo people. Biren Singh himself launched a no-holds-barred campaign against the Kuki-Zo people, accusing them of "drug trafficking", "poppy cultivation", "forest encroachment" and harbouring "illegal immigrants" from Myanmar.

In August 2024, more than a year after the start of the violence, the Manipur tapes came to light in the form of audio clips circulated on social media. On 7 August, the Kuki Students' Organisation announced that it had the full audio recording, which contained numerous incriminating statements by Singh. It also shared a transcript of excerpts from the recording. On 19 August, the news website The Wire published a series of articles covering highlights from the recording, while also revealing that the full recording had been submitted by the sources to the government-appointed Ajay Lamba Commission in June 2024. The sources also submitted an affidavit attesting to its authenticity but requested protection and anonymity. The date of the recording and all other potentially identifying information were kept confidential.

== Contents of the tapes ==
The audio recording is reported to be 48 minutes long and purported to contain conversations of Biren Singh with his associates in a closed-door meeting at the Singh's official residence. The conversations are in the Meitei language with some parts in Hindi. The Wire said that it confirmed the date, subject and contents of the meeting with the meeting participants, who remain anonymous.

In one section of the tape, Singh is heard claiming credit for the conflict. The voice claims to have studied "all of these [issues]" (concerning land in the state) for the past 10–15 years and "when I saw all of these, I started operations". Singh had previously alleged that the number of Kuki villages had grown enormously over a 15-year period. Here the voice adds that Naga villages had not grown in the same fashion and quips, "Haven't you seen on the map? Don't you feel like crying?". It further claims, "We started seeking governmental [rights] over reserved forest land [and] protected forest land." The speaker also alleges that the Kukis were occupying too many civil service posts enabled by job reservations available to Scheduled Tribes, again exempting the Nagas from this alleged appropriation. Kukis were also blamed for growing through Imphal city by establishing colonies in a manner dissimilar to the Nagas. The Wire noted that Kuki residential colonies in Imphal were attacked by mobs in May 2023, leading to a substantial death toll among the Kukis.

In another section of the tape, the alleged voice of Biren Singh claims to have used bombs to prosecute the said "war". It also implies that the Union home minister Amit Shah was aware of this fact. During his visit to the state in May 2023, Shah is said to have warned the speaker as well as the DGP not to use bombs. But after Shah left, the speaker claims to have told his people to use the bombs covertly rather than openly. The speaker also claims credit for the looting of 4,000–5,000 weapons from the police armouries and the fact that no one has been arrested for the act. It says, "if they arrest, it, the CM, will be the first. It is me who will be arrested for the snatching away of the 4000–5000 guns." The speaker is also heard saying that he would ensure arms supply and that, if the state police arrest anyone, he "will handle it".

The speaker was also aware of resentment he was facing from the Kukis. "Kukis will scold me, abuse me... why won't they? I have destroyed a lot..." He also admits that their casualties are "a bit high", around 300 deaths. Yet the speaker also displays clear enmity towards the Kukis: "If I was not CM, I would have shelled bombs."

In yet another section of the tape, the recorded voice talks about the naked parade incident from the Manipur viral video. It makes light of the crime against the two women who were sexually assaulted and berates the Meitei civil society organisations for not taking credit: "it is we, the Meiteis who saved them from the mob". It asserts that the Meitei community was very badly shamed by the episode, but that it failed to claim credit for saving the women, clothing them and sending them home, ignoring the fact that their male relatives had not been spared by the mob. The recording makes it clear that the speaker was opposed to taking action against the perpetrators of the crime: "I told those people [...] that those people arrested should instead be rewarded. Rewarded for saving them". The Wire stated that the Singh had made similar statements in public.

The Wire commented that the statements as recorded were communally divisive and inflammatory. They also raised fundamental concerns about the ruling dispensation in the state.

== Attempts of suppression and diversion ==
The Government of Manipur issued a statement on 8 August labelling the audio clips on social media as "falsely claiming to be that of the Hon'ble Chief Minister, Manipur". It claimed that the clips were "doctored" and represented a "malicious attempt" to incite communal violence and to derail peace initiatives. It warned that legal action would be taken against all individuals and organisations involved in "this conspiracy", stating that the Manipur Police were actively investigating the matter and were committed to uncovering the origins of the clips. The Kuki Students' Organisation responded by announcing that it was willing to share the full audio recording with any media or government agency interested in conducting an analysis for authenticity.

On 20 August, the government effectively threatened The Wire, issuing a strong warning against all those involved in spreading "false and fabricated information" through "any media", threatening prosecution. It also branded the coverage of the audio clips an "anti-national activity" that would allegedly incite "hatred and mistrust among communities".

Despite the denials by the official government bodies, Singh's brother as well as Leishemba Sanajaoba, Manipur's titular maharaja and Rajya Sabha MP, mentioned the leakers on social media, labelling them as "traitors" who passed the tapes on to "the enemy". The Wire journalist regarded the posts as indication of the genuineness of the tapes.

After this, all efforts by the Kuki-Zo people to publicise the Manipur tapes were confronted with an escalation of violence, an apparent effort to divert media and public attention. The day after the Kuki-Zo people held nationwide rallies to protest the Singh's alleged statements in the Manipur tapes, a clash broke out near the village of Koutruk, where, according to Kukis, a key strategic road linking Churachandpur and Kangpokpi through the hills was ambushed by Meitei groups. It was alleged that in the ensuing retaliation, Kuki groups used armed drones. The resulting "drones controversy" played out in the media for weeks. On 5 September, the Kuki Organisation for Human Rights (KOHUR) wrote to the Supreme Court-appointed investigating officer, Dattatrey Padsalgikar, as well as the National Human Rights Commission, asking for an investigation of the Manipur tapes. Seemingly in response, further allegations arose in Manipur, accusing Kukis of shooting rockets into the Imphal Valley. Protesters marched on Raj Bhavan, the Governor's residence, pelted stones and demanded that Singh be given full control over security. Subsequently, the Chief Minister's Office issued a security alert claiming that 900 Kuki militants from Myanmar were planning to infiltrate into Manipur, further inflaming tensions. The alert was later cancelled after the Indian Army questioned the intelligence.

On 7 November, the day before the Supreme Court of India listed the Manipur tapes case for hearing, a major unprovoked attack took place on the village of Zairawn in Jiribam district, in which a Hmar woman was shot and brutally burnt to death. The attack initiated a major cycle of violence resulting in dozens of deaths in all communities. After the Supreme Court agreed to examine the Manipur tapes on 8 November, another crisis erupted at the village of Saibol, which lasted until mid-January.

The cycles of escalation ended after Singh's resignation on 9 February 2025, which came days after the Supreme Court ordered a forensic examination of the Manipur tapes. Afterwards, the state came under President's rule, and the legislative assembly was put under suspended animation.

== Supreme Court proceedings ==
KOHUR filed a writ petition in the Supreme Court of India in late October 2024, seeking a court-monitored investigation into the leaked tapes. Filed through its advocate Prashant Bhushan, the petition said that the tapes "prima facie show the complicity and involvement of the state machinery in violence against the Kuki-Zo community". Citing several portions of the contents of the tapes, it claimed that Biren Singh, as the chief minister of Manipur, was "instrumental in inciting, organising and thereafter centrally orchestrating" violence against the Kuki-Zo people.

The Supreme Court listed the petition for a hearing on 8 November. The Attorney General R. Venkataramani and Solicitor General Tushar Mehta urged the court not to take up the case, arguing that it should be heard by the Manipur High Court instead. Nevertheless, the Court agreed to examine the contents of the recording and asked the petitioner to file material to prove its authenticity. The Solicitor General vehemently objected to the plea and alleged that the intention of the petitioner was to "keep the fire burning", whereas Singh was working to reestablish peace in the state. He also berated the judges, who included the Chief Justice Y. V. Chandrachud, claiming that they were "living in ivory towers" without knowledge of the issues of a "porous border". The Court dismissed the objections and allowed the case to proceed.

On 3 February 2025, KOHUR submitted a forensic report from the reputed Truth Labs Forensic Services, a private non-profit organisation backed by former chief justice M. N. Venkatachaliah and other jurists, which confirmed with 93% certainty that the voice on the recording belonged to Singh. The report said that repeated critical listening indicated similarity of voices, and that the intonation patterns of 20 commonly uttered words and vowel distribution patterns were found to be similar with high probability. It also said that it detected no abrupt changes in the background noise, context, tone consistency, speech fluency or loudness in the acoustic analysis of the audio recording.

The Solicitor General however objected to the Truth Labs report, claiming that it was a private organisation and the petitioner's motives were questionable. He informed the court that investigators had already approached "the person who uploaded the clips on X (formerly twitter)" and added that the audio clips had been sent to the Central Forensic Science Laboratory (CFSL). According to The Hindu, the Solicitor General also stated that the Union government had sent "the content handed over to it by the petitioner" to CFSL. The court ordered a CFSL analysis of the tapes, instructed that the findings be submitted within a month, and ordered the case to be relisted for the week beginning 24 March.

After some delays, on 5 May, the solicitor general submitted a report from CFSL in a sealed cover, and added, "we need a month to probe it". The court however found the report inadequate. It asked the solicitor general to read the report and "bring a fresh report". The court took note of the solicitor general's statement that the investigation, presumably by the state government, would continue. KOHUR's advocate Prashant Bhushan objected to the investigation, stating that it would be conducted by the state police. The Court overruled him, stating, "Mr Bhushan, we are not staying that, we have seen the report."

When the "fresh report" from CFSL did not become available on 4 August, the Supreme Court questioned the delay. On 19 August, when the report was submitted, the court said it was "misdirected". The report was apparently addressing the question of whether the "clips" were authentic. Its answers were described by the Court as "wishy-washy". The court pointed out that it was not interested in the question of authenticity; rather, it wanted to know the identity of the voice on the recording, whether it belonged to the "individual", i.e., former chief minister Biren Singh. The court demanded the solicitor general produce the instructions that were given to CFSL.

On 26 August, CFSL admitted that it was unable to identify the voice, according to news reports. The court thanked it for its efforts, and ordered a fresh investigation by National Forensic Science Laboratory (NFSL) in Gandhinagar (Gujarat). It asked two questions: (i) whether the "audio clips" in question were modified, edited or tampered with, and (ii) whether the voice in the clips matches the voice in the "admitted audio sample".

On 3 November, NFSL submitted its report stating that the "four exhibits" it was provided showed signs of modification and tampering, and that they do not constitute the original source recording. It stated that the clips were not scientifically fit for forensic voice comparison. After a contest from the petitioner's counsel that the "50-minute recording" (marked as Y1) was unedited and certified by the Truth Labs, the Court ordered the NFSL report to be provided to the petitioner and scheduled a further hearing.

On 20 November, KOHUR filed a counter-petition pointing out that the 48-minute audio recording that it submitted in January 2025 was not analysed by the NFSL. Instead, only four short clips ranging from 30 seconds to two minutes, provided by Manipur Police, were apparently analysed, and they would have provided no meaningful analysis of continuity, authenticity or context. KOHUR called it "shocking" that the full recording was not sent to the government laboratory for analysis. On 15 December, the Supreme Court questioned the Manipur government why only a portion of the audio recording was sent to the forensic lab. It said that it was a "little disturbed" by this revelation. The Additional Solicitor General requested a week's time to respond.

== Bibliography ==
- Report on the Manipur Violence: A historical contextualization of state-sponsored ethnic cleansing, New Delhi: Kuki Organisation for Human Rights Trust, December 2024
- Manufacturing ethnic segregation and conflict: A report on the violence in Manipur, All India Lawyers Association for Justice, August 2023
