= Christianity in Manipur =

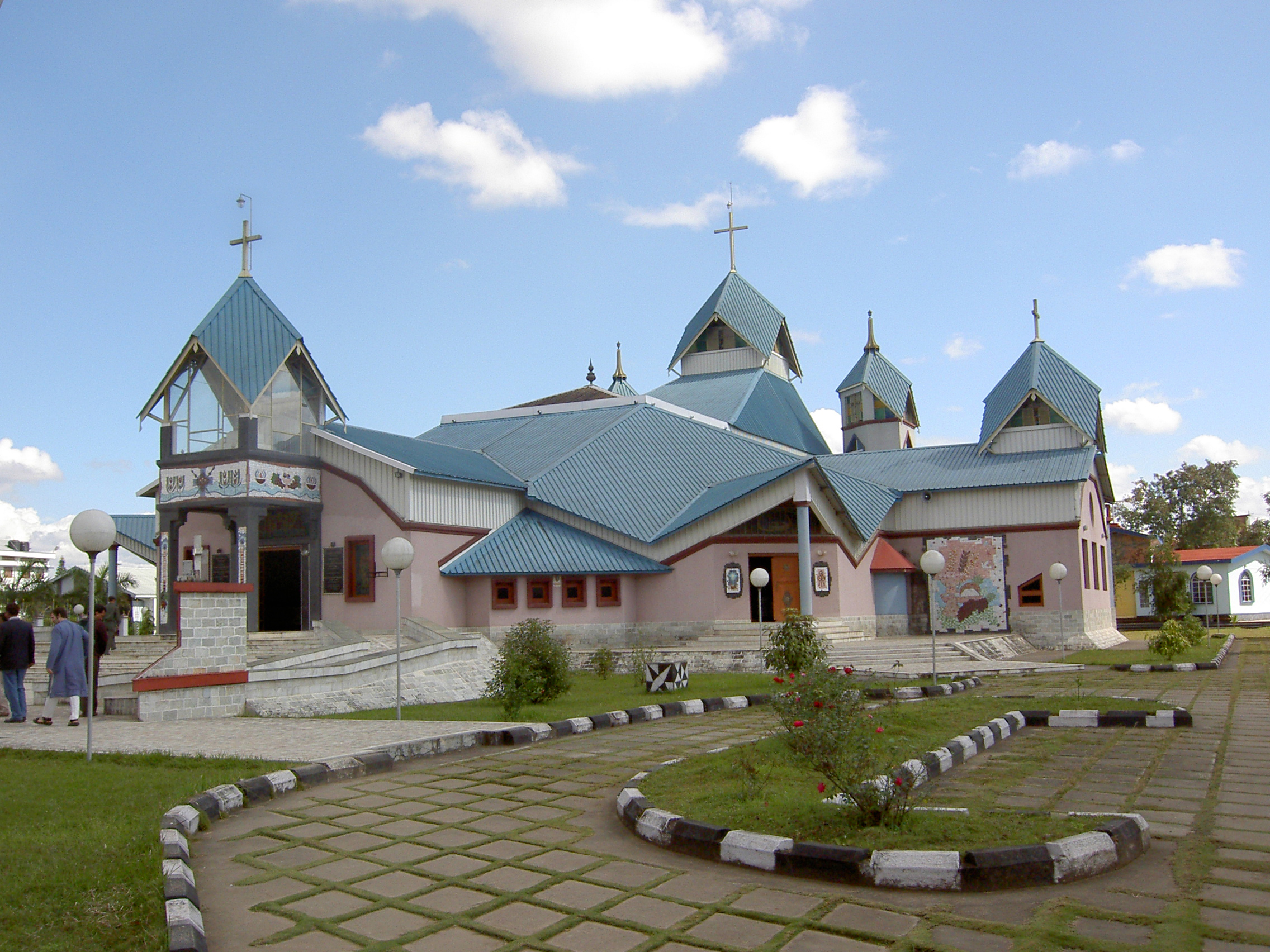
St. Joseph's Cathedral, Imphal

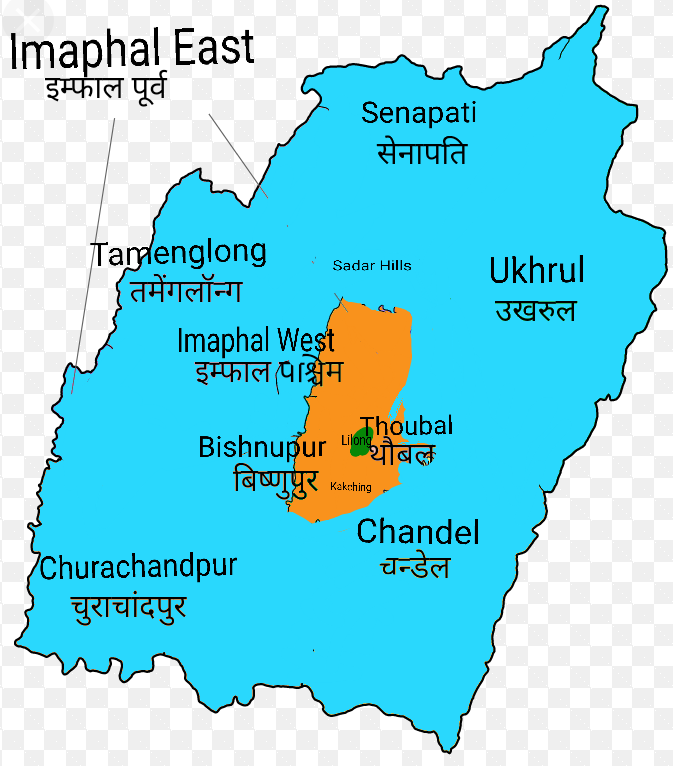
Majority religions in Manipur—Christian in blue, Hindu in orange, Muslim in green

Christianity is the second largest religion in Manipur, a state in Northeast India, according to 2011 census. The tribal communities, Kuki-Zo and Naga people, are overwhelmingly Christian, along with their kindred communities in the neighbouring states. (Note: Neighbouring Nagaland has 88 percent Christian population, as does Mizoram.) The dominant Meitei community has only small numbers of Christians, but Meitei groups claim Christianity to be a threat. At the start of the 2023–2024 Manipur violence, Meitei mobs burned down 200–300 churches in the Imphal Valley belonging to all communities, and prohibited pastors from rebuilding them. The vast majority of Manipuri Christians are Protestants; primarily Baptists and Presbyterians.

== Early missionaries ==
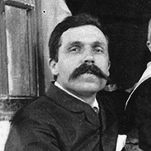
Rev Willian Pettigrew guess (1902) - first missionary to the Kingdom of Manipur

Christianity in Manipur can traced back to an Anglican missionary named William Pettigrew, who lived in India when Surchandra Singh was the maharaja of Manipur. Pettigrew. He was born in Edinburgh and educated in London, applied to work with the Arthington Aborigines Mission in India and travelled to Bengal in 1890. He worked for two years in Dhaka and Silchar. In 1891, Pettigrew applied for permission to work in Manipur, but this was not granted until 1894. He worked for a time as a teacher in Imphal, teaching the children of government civil servants and soon afterwards opened a school for boys in Manipuri and established a permanent mission station there.

== Origins ==
The first Meitei to convert to Christianity is debated. It is traditionally believed that Angom Porom Singh of Phayeng was the first to be converted in around 1896, but another tradition says that Ningol Kaboklei met a Christian missionary in Sylhet (presently in Bangladesh) and converted to Christianity in around 1893, a few years prior to the arrival of William Pettigrew.

In December 1912, Porom Singh became the headmaster of a school at Ukhrul, where his teaching responsibilities included preaching the gospel. He was one of only seven Christians who stood by Pettigrew. At the outbreak of the First World War, he helped Pettigrew raise a labour corps, later becoming a corps leader and an interpreter.

== Followers ==
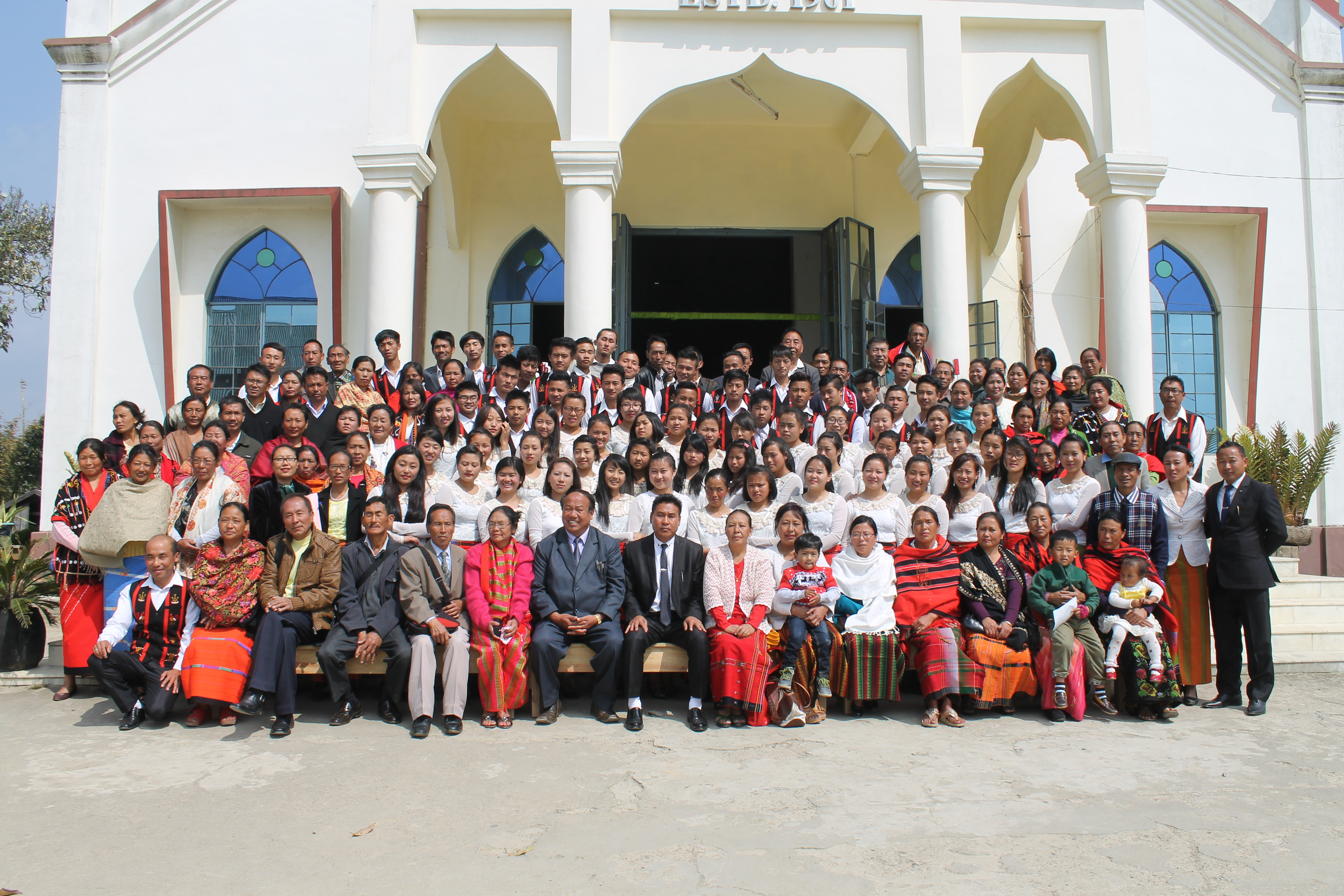
Phungyo Baptist Church along with its members

Protestants (mostly Baptists and Presbyterians) substantially outnumber Catholics in Manipur. A Manipur Baptist Convention exists. The Reformed Presbyterian Church North-East India Synod has its seat in Manipur. The Presbyterian Church in India and the Church of Christ are present in the state, too. The Roman Catholic Archdiocese of Imphal has its seat in the state. The Manipur Section of the Seventh-day Adventist Church has about forty congregations. The All Manipur Christian Organisation (AMCO) exists.

== Demography ==
Religion in Manipur (2011)
1. Hinduism (41.4%)
2. Christianity (41.3%)
3. Islam (8.40%)
4. Other religion (8.90%)

Historical Christian Population in Manipur
Year	Pop.	±%
1901	45	—
1911	132	+193.3%
1921	4,050	+2968.2%
1931	10,401	+156.8%
1941	25,727	+147.4%
1951	68,394	+165.8%
1961	152,043	+122.3%
1971	279,243	+83.7%
1981	421,702	+51.0%
1991	626,669	+48.6%
2001	857,285	+36.8%
2011	1,179,043	+37.5%
Source: Centre for Policy Studies

As per the 2011 census, there are 1,179,043 Christians in Manipur, making up 41.3 percent of the population. Of these, 1,119,719 people are in the hill districts, (Note: The hill districts in 2011 were Senapati, Tamenglong, Churachandpur, Ukhrul and Chandel.) where they make up 92 percent of population.

The valley districts (Note: The valley districts in 2011 were Bishnupur, Thoubal, Imphal East and Imphal West. (The Jiribam subdivision was included in the Imphal East district.)) have 59,324 Christians, making up 3.6 percent of the population. The majority of them are expected to be tribals (56,913 in the 2011 census). (Note: There are 28,205 Nagas, 20,618 Kuki-Zo people and 6,590 Old Kiki/Naga people living in the valley districts.) The remaining 2,000–3,000 people would belong to the non-tribal communities including the Meiteis. (Note: Estimates of 300,000 (3 lakh) Meitei Christians given by some journalists are not supported by the census data. The number is closer to 3,000.)

=== Tribes ===
Christianity among social group of Manipur, 2011 census
1. Scheduled Tribes (96.5%)
2. General (incl. converted Scheduled Castes) population (3.54%)

The Christian population in the state is predominantly composed of members of the Scheduled Tribe communities, accounting for 97.42% of the total Scheduled Tribe population. They are:

Tribe	Christians	Percent
Thadou	211,272	97.85%
Tangkhul	175,200	98.11%
Poumai	126,092	98.99%
Kabui	93,416	89.90%
Mao	92,602	99.21%
Kacha Naga	64,357	97.28%
Paite	54,815	98.69%
Hmar	47,804	98.82%
Vaiphei	42,224	98.29%
Kuki	27,784	98.03%
Maram	27,221	98.90%
Maring	25,858	97.86%
Zou	23,718	97.63%
Anal	23,107	98.29%
Gangte	16,859	98.14%
Kom	14,345	98.74%

== Persecution and violence ==
During the past seven decades, Hindu nationalist organisations have demanded the revival of the indigenous faiths of tribal communities in Northeast India. The Rashtriya Swayamsevak Sangh (RSS) has also demanded that the Scheduled Tribe status of tribals should be revoked unless they return to their indigenous faiths or Hinduism.

It was reported that the Meiteis were alarmed by the rapid rise of Christianity in Manipur in recent years. Claims were made that there was a 62% increase of Christians in the state between 2001 and 2011, and that the valley districts saw a jump of 15%. (Note: The census data shows only an increase of 37% and the increase in valley districts could be partly attributed to the migration of tribal Christians into the valley.) In recent decades, the Meiteis aimed to revive the traditional religion called Sanamahism, and many Meitei Hindus started adopting it. Pressure was brought on Meitei Christians as well to convert to Sanamahism. The Meitei activists organisations Arambai Tenggol and Meitei Leepun instrumental in applying this pressure, as well as the leadership of the ruling Bharatiya Janata Party (BJP). According to Meitei pastors, the terms of conversion for Meitei Christians required them to personally burn the Bible, remove all Christian symbols from their homes, and sign a legal affidavit declaring their conversion to Sanamahism.

There were various points of tension between the Meitei Christians and non-Christians in the months prior to May 2023. A rally held by Meitei Christian MLA Paonam Brojen Singh came in for criticism because he is alleged to have admired tribal Christians for their recent progress and claimed that Meiteis were being held back by their "old religion". After the ethnic violence started in May 2023, a mob of several thousand people attacked his house.

The 2023 ethnic violence started on 3 May at the border between Kuki-dominated Churachandpur district and Meitei-dominated Bishnupur district, soon after a tribal solidarity march held by tribals against a Meitei demand for Scheduled Tribe status. The first victim of the violence was a pastor from Torbung–Kangvai area called Haopu Kipgen, who was bludgeoned to death. The violence spread to Churachandpur Town and the Imphal City on the same day, and to the rest of Imphal Valley quickly afterwards. A very large number of churches (estimates ranging from 200 to 300) were burnt down by Meitei mobs in the next few days. The Catholic Archbishop of Imphal Dominic Lumon has said that 249 churches were burnt down in 36 hours. While he claimed that all these churches belonged to Meitei Christians, it was not corroborated by others. Congress leader Bhakta Charan Das said 18 churches belonging to the Meitei community and 2 churches belonging to the Naga community were destroyed, while the others were of unspecified affiliation. Many of the destroyed churches are believed to have served multiple communities. Some of the pastors had to flee under the cover of darkness to escape death.

After this initial spurt of destruction, the Christians in the valley appear to have been extensively persecuted. A pastor said that a mob forcefully entered his home and burned all Christian texts, including the Bible. Most pastors were found to be too afraid to speak to journalists. Some were beaten up. Some had fled the state. Others were forced to convert to Sanamahism.

There were also attempts to downplay the role of extremist Sanamahi groups and push the blame on to the Kuki people. The Meitei Christian Churches Council issued a press statement claiming that all the destruction of Meitei Christian properties was carried out by the Kukis. But the Archbishop denied it, saying there was no evidence for the claim. Philem Rohan Singh, a celebrity cyclist who emerged as a Meitei Christian leader after the violence, claimed that the Kukis had burnt down Meitei Christian churches in the Kuki-dominated districts, giving a list of such churches. Again this was denied by the Archbishop as well as journalists who verified that many of those churches were still standing unharmed. Rohan Singh also claimed that an agreement had been reached with Arambai Tenggol and Meitei Leepun to resume church services in the valley. However the displaced pastors did not believe the claim saying he could have said under threats.

There were also efforts to paint the Manipur violence as a purely ethnic clash, with no religious angle. The BJP quoted Cardinal Oswald Gracias, the Archbishop of Bombay, as stating this. However, Archbishop Lumon took a firm stand in an interview with Karan Thapar, pointing out the attacks on Meitei Christian churches and pastors. The British Foreign Secretary David Cameron made a similar point in the House of Lords, based a report by David Campanale. The Meitei groups continue to make the claim.

== List of denominations ==
Sources:

- Evangelical Congregational Church
- United Pentecostal Church International
- Kuki Baptist Convention
- Kuki Christian Church
- Manipur Baptist Convention
- The Pentecostal Mission
- Presbyterian Church in India (Reformed)
- Roman Catholic church
- Manipur Evangelical Lutheran Church (49) 8,500
- Christian Revival Church

== See also ==
- List of Christian denominations in North East India
- Christian Revival Church

== Bibliography ==
- Manimohan Singh, Karam (1991), History of the Christian Missions in Manipur and Neighbouring States, Mittal Publications, ISBN 81-7099-285-0 – via archive.org
