= Licypriya Kangujam =

Indian climate activist (born 2011)

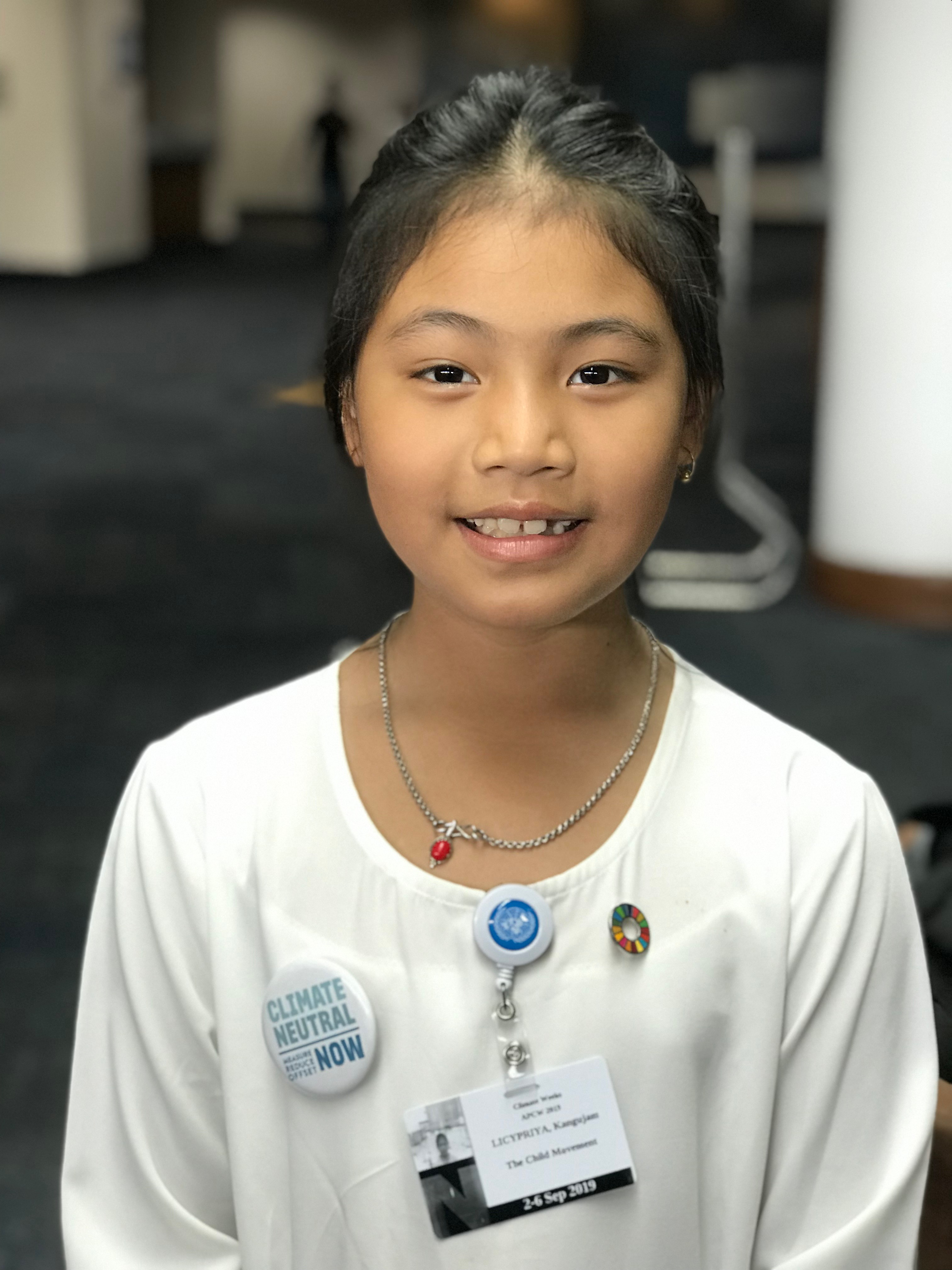
- At the United Nations Asia-Pacific Climate Week in Bangkok, 5 September 2019
- Born: Licypriya Kangujam; 2 October 2011 (age 15); Bashikhong, Manipur, India
- Occupations: Student, environmental activist
- Years active: 2018–present
- Relatives: Chinglensana Kangujam (uncle)
- Website: Licipriya Foundation

Licypriya Kangujam (Meitei pronunciation: [lisipɾija kaŋŋud͡ʒɐm]; born 2 October 2011) is an environmental activist from Manipur, India. She has appeared at United Nations climate conferences, including speaking at COP25 in Madrid and staging a protest during a high-level session at COP28 in Dubai.. Since 2023, through her social media accounts, she has endorsed the Meitei militia Arambai Tenggol involved in Manipur ethnic conflict, and crowdfunded military equipment for the group.

== Early life and activism ==
Kangujam was born on 2 October 2011 in Bashikhong, Manipur, India, in a family of Meitei ethnicity. After attending a UN disaster conference in Mongolia with her father in 2018, she began public activism and founded an organisation called the "Child Movement" with assistance of her parents. .

In June 2019, she protested outside the Indian parliament calling for climate change legislation. She spoke at COP25 in Madrid in December 2019, with her attendance sponsored by the Government of Spain and the European Climate Foundation. In January 2020, she co-signed a letter to the World Economic Forum with Greta Thunberg and others calling on governments to stop subsidising fossil fuels. She also campaigned to make climate change education mandatory in Indian schools, though critics disputed her claimed influence on Gujarat's curriculum changes, alleging that the government's acknowledgement was a routine response rather than evidence of direct impact.

During the COVID-19 pandemic, Kangujam launched a crowdfunding appeal on seeking ₹1 crore (US$100,000) to purchase 100 oxygen concentrators, which later drew scrutiny following the arrest of her father and legal guardian, Kangujam Karnajit. She received the T. N. Khoshoo Memorial Award in 2020 from the Ashoka Trust for Research in Ecology and the Environment (ATREE) for "having achieved monumental impact while campaigning for climate change at the young age of 9" but later erased from records. Her climate change campaigns on social media were also promoted on Twitter (now X) by the UK High Commission and the official account of the UN Climate Change Conference (COP26). The Print contacted COP26 to ask whether it had fact-checked the activists claims but did not receive a response. A spokesperson for the UK High Commission stated, "As one of the biggest issues facing the world today, it's important that all generations work together to tackle climate change. We cannot comment on individuals' personal affiliations or activities.

On 11 December 2023, Kangujam ran onto the stage at COP28 in Dubai with a sign reading "End fossil fuels. Save our planet and our future" and repeatedly heckling those on stage. After receiving a round of applause from the audience, she was subsequently removed by security from the conference and had accreditation removed. Kangujam expressed frustration at her removal from the conference.

Kangujam's climate activism story has been included in a Grade 5 English textbook under the CBSE syllabus. Her work has also been featured in educational materials for Grades 4 and 7 and referenced in courses offered by several universities under the framework of the National Education Policy (NEP) 2020. She attempted to enter the Guinness World Records by spelling the sentence "Save our Planet and our Future" using 6,056 plastic bottles.

== Role in the Manipur ethnic conflict ==
Following the outbreak of the ethnic violence in Manipur in May 2023, which displaced over 60,000 people and killed more than 258, Kangujam posted on social media on 9 May alleging that she had received threats of sexual violence from individuals associated with the Kuki community, sharing a photograph of an individual she identified as a perpetrator. Licypriya's social media profile subsequently endorsed Arambai Tenggol on Facebook on the 16th, writing: "I support Arambai Tenggol. More power to you all." The group, a Meitei militia, was described by Amnesty International as a radical extremist group responsible for assaults, sexual violence, and murder against the Kuki-Zo community. Licypriya posted a photograph with members of the group, pledging support for the Meitei cause, and was photographed with its commander-in-chief, who was under investigation by the National Investigation Agency for allegedly looting arms from state armouries. She used her social media accounts to characterise the Kuki-Zo community as a threat, describing the "true mentality of Kuki everywhere" and stating they were "not just [a] threat to Manipur, but to entire India."

Her posts on the conflict, which portrayed the Meitei community as victims, were mostly written in Meiteilon, keeping her international followers unaware of her positions, and she framed her support for the militia as part of a "climate war" between communities who "love nature" and those who "hate nature". The Quint identified her as one of several prominent social media figures through whom the dominant community's narrative was promoted during the conflict, and The Wesean Times & BOOM identified her as helping elevate the group's profile as it used social media to radicalise Meitei youth, including minors.

=== Crowdfunding military equipment ===
In December 2023, shortly after her appearance at COP28, Licypriya used Facebook to crowdfund a thermal drone worth ₹7 lakh (approximately US$8,500), writing in Meiteilon that the drone was needed for "entering war" and that fighting without it "increases casualties". She posted personal digital payment details for donations.

In early 2024, she publicly donated military equipment, including thermal drones, to Arambai Tenggol. The Indigenous Tribal Leaders' Forum (ITLF) and the Committee on Tribal Unity (COTU), Kuki-Zo civil society organisations, alleged that the drones were used in attacks against Kuki-Zo settlements. They criticised the absence of legal action against her, contrasting it with the prompt arrest of a Kuki youth on a similar charge. Her drone crowdfunding was cited in an academic study on the national security implications of the Manipur conflict published in the Journal of Asian and African Studies.

== Child welfare concerns ==
Keisam Pradipkumar, Chairperson of the Manipur Commission of Protection of Child Rights, stated in 2021 that if Licypriya was found to have been manipulated by her father, she would be classified as a child in need of care and protection. After speaking with the family, he said he found no evidence of manipulation, but noted that further investigation would fall outside his commission's mandate. The Manipur Alliance for Child Rights called for child protection officers to offer Licypriya counselling, citing concern about the impact of the situation on her wellbeing. Its convenor Montu Ahanthem warned of potential trauma.

== See also ==
- Ridhima Pandey
- Vanessa Nakate
