= Vungzagin Valte =

Indian politician (1964–2026)

Member of Manipur Legislative Assembly
- Constituency: Thanlon

Personal details
- Born: 3 April 1964
- Died: 20 February 2026 (aged 61)
- Party: Bharatiya Janata Party (from 2017)
- Other political affiliations: Indian National Congress

Vungzagin Valte (3 April 1964 – 20 February 2026) was an Indian politician from Manipur. He was a three-time member of the Manipur Legislative Assembly from the Thanlon constituency in Pherzawl district, first as a member of the Indian National Congress and later, from 2017, as a member of the Bharatiya Janata Party. He was a cabinet minister during 2017–2022, holding the portfolios of Transport, Tribal Affairs & Hills, and General Administration. After 2022, he had the role of chief advisor to the chief minister N. Biren Singh on tribal affairs.

After the eruption of the 2023–2025 Manipur violence, Valte was brutally attacked by a Meitei mob in Imphal while returning from a meeting with the chief minister. He was seriously crippled and partly paralysed, and spent months hospitalised. After partial recovery and return to Churachandpur, he continued to suffer from ailments related to the attack, and finally succumbed to them in February 2026. No one was held accountable for his killing.

== Early life ==
Valte was born on 3 April 1964 in the village Mualnuam in Churachandpur district. He belonged to the Paite tribe, and adopted the Zomi identity in preference to the Kuki-Zo identity. Valte held a Bachelor of Arts degree.

== Career ==
Valte was elected to the Manipur Legislative Assembly from the Thanlon constituency in 2012 on an Indian National Congress ticket. In 2017, Valte switched to the Bharatiya Janata Party (BJP) along with a number of Manipur legislators, and retained his Thanlon seat. In 2020, after a Cabinet shuffle, he was appointed as a Cabinet minister, holding the portfolios of Transport, Tribal Affairs & Hills, and General Administration. In 2022, he retained his Thanlon seat again. Valte did not receive a ministerial post this time, but was given the role of "Advisor to the Chief Minister".

== Attack and death ==
On 3 May 2023, ethnic violence broke out between the Meitei and Kuki-Zo (or "Kuki") communities in the state. The Kuki & Zomi people living in the Meitei-dominated Imphal Valley bore the brunt of the violence, with 18 people getting killed on 3 May and 33 people the next day. According to the Kuki Organisation for Human Rights (KOHUR), most Kuki & Zomi colonies in the Imphal City were attacked on the night of 3 May, partially burnt down and the residents driven out.

The following day, Valte attended a meeting called by the chief minister N. Biren Singh in the secretariat, where he is reported to have argued for the safety and transport of the Kuki & Zomi people fleeing Imphal. He received a government order addressing the issues, with which he was returning to his official residence. On the way, his car was stopped by a group of people wearing black clothes, whom Valte later described as "Meitei militia", widely understood to be Arambai Tenggol militias. According to his son, Valte was stunned with a taser gun and repeatedly hit on the head with a sharp object.

He was airlifted to Delhi in critical condition and nearly spent two years undergoing treatment. He returned to Churachandpur on 18 April 2025, bound in a wheel chair. Talking to Press, he emphasised that the path to peace in Manipur lies in granting autonomy to the Kuki-Zomi-Hmar people through Union Territory status. He expressed unwillingness to sit with the Meiteis at the negotiation table. He also thanked the Ministry of Home Affairs for establishing buffer zones between Kuki-Zo- and Meitei-dominated areas.

Valte continued to suffer from complications due to the life-threatening injuries suffered during the attack. On 8 February 2026, he was airlifted Delhi again and taken to a private hospital in Gurugram. He died in hospital on 20 February 2026 and buried in July 4th,2026.
