= 2026 Manipur bombing =

2026 bombing and protests in Manipur, India

A bomb attack took place on 7 April 2026 at a village called Tronglaobi near Moirang in the Imphal Valley in the state of Manipur, India. The blast hit a civilian house at 1:00 a.m. and resulted in the death of two children and critical injuriy to their mother Coming after a year of relative calm in the Imphal Valley during the President's Rule, the incident caused significant outrage among the Meitei community, which automatically blamed the Kuki people for the bombing. Initial investigations revealed that the bombs were launched from close vicinity of the house and pointed to the involvement of "local elements". Nevertheless, the Meitei community launched protests led by Meira Paibis, which lasted for weeks, causing further violence, attacks, deaths and arrests. The Kuki community objected to the unwarranted blame game and pointed to the presence of former chief minister N. Biren Singh in Moirang on the day of the bombing.

== Incidents ==
After the attack, about 500 angry protesters attacked a nearby CRPF camp located near the Bishnupur–Churachandpur border area at Gelmol. Protesters set the cars on fire and the police resorted to firing bullets and using smoke bombs to disperse the crowd. During the rioting, two protesters were shot dead, another thirty-one protesters suffered gunshot wounds, and a third protester died of injuries on 8 April. After the incident, the state government imposed curfew in the Bishnupur district and restricted the use of mobile data/internet for three days in five valley districts under Rule 3 of the Temporary Suspension of Telecommunication Services Rules, 2024.

== Investigations ==
The National Investigation Agency took charge of the case investigation and on 8 April. Security forces arrested three members of the UKNA in Churachandpur district after finding arms and 21 kilograms of raw opium in the raid. The current, Chief Minister Yumnam Khemchand Singh condemned the attack as an attempt to destabilise the recently formed state government and derail ongoing peace efforts.

== See also ==
- Manipur conflict
