= 2001 Manipur Uprising =

2001 civil uprising in Manipur, India

- Part of Naga Conflict and Insurgency in Manipur
- Date: 18 June 2001
- Location: Imphal Valley, Manipur, India
- Caused by: Extension of ceasefire with NSCN-IM "without territorial limits"
- Methods: Arson; Vandalism; Rioting
- Result: Withdrawal/modification of ceasefire clause

Casualties
- Deaths: 13–18 civilians killed
- Injuries: 50+

The 2001 Manipur Uprising, also known as the Great June Uprising or 18 June Uprising, was a mass civil protest and violent unrest that took place on 18 June 2001 in Imphal Valley in the Indian state of Manipur. The uprising was triggered by the Government of India's decision to extend the ceasefire agreement with the NSCN-IM "without territorial limits", which was widely perceived as a threat to Manipur's territorial integrity.

The protests escalated into large-scale violence, including arson and attacks on government buildings. Security forces opened fire on demonstrators, resulting in the deaths of at least 13 civilians, though later commemorations recognize 18 people as martyrs.

The day is commemorated annually in Manipur as Uprising Unity Day.

== Background ==
One of the central issues has been the demand for a "Greater Nagalim" by the NSCN-IM, which seeks to integrate Naga-inhabited areas across Manipur, Assam, Arunachal Pradesh and Nagaland.

=== Ceasefire agreement ===
On 14 June 2001, the Government of India extended its ceasefire agreement with NSCN-IM during talks held in Bangkok, Thailand. The extension included the phrase "without territorial limits", implying that the ceasefire would apply beyond Nagaland into neighboring states.

The decision triggered widespread opposition in Manipur, where it was seen as a threat to the state's territorial integrity. Civil society organisations such as the United Committee Manipur (UCM) and All Manipur United Clubs Organisation (AMUCO) led protests against the move.

== Event ==
Following the announcement of the ceasefire extension, protests erupted across Imphal Valley on 18 June 2001. A general strike (bandh) was called and large numbers of people gathered in the streets of Imphal. The protests escalated into violent clashes:

- Demonstrators attacked and set fire to the Manipur Legislative Assembly building
- Several government offices and infrastructure were destroyed
- Public property was extensively damaged

Security forces responded by opening fire on the protesters.

=== Casualties ===
At least 13 civilians were killed in the firing, while over 50 people sustained injured. Later commemorations in Manipur recognize 18 individuals as martyrs of the uprising.

== Aftermath ==
=== Policy changes ===
Following the unrest, the Government of India revised the ceasefire terms and removed the controversial "without territorial limits" clause.

== Legacy ==
=== Uprising Unity Day ===
18 June is observed annually in Imphal Valley as Uprising Unity Day. The day is marked by shutdowns, memorial events and tributes to those killed during the uprising.

== See also ==
- 2016 Manipur unrest
- Naga nationalism
