= Asha Menon =

Asha Menon may refer to:

- Asha Menon (judge) (born 1960), judge of the Delhi High Court
- Asha Menon (writer) (born 1947), Indian writer and reviewer of Malayalam literature
- Asha G. Menon (born 1985), Indian Malayalam film playback singer
