= Manipuri calendar =

Manipuri calendar may refer to:

- Meitei calendar, the traditional calendar of the Meitei people based on traditional Meitei religion (Sanamahism)
- Regional system of the Hindu calendar as used by the Hindus in Manipur
