= Manipur conflict (2023–present) =

Ongoing ethnic conflict in Manipur, Northeast India

- Date: 3 May 2023 – present (3 years, 6 months, 1 week and 4 days)
- Location: Manipur, India; 24°36′N 93°48′E
- Caused by: Ethnic conflict, (Note: Sources:) Meitei majoritarianism, (Note: Sources:) anti-Christian sentiment, (Note: Sources:) Hindutva ideology, (Note: Sources:) refugee influx (alleged), (Note: Sources:) drug trafficking (alleged) (Note: Sources:)
- Methods: Arson (including churches and temples), (Note: Sources:) vandalism,rioting, murder (including lynching), (Note: Sources:) mutilation, (Note: Sources:) plundering, (Note: Sources:) mass rape (Note: Sources:)

Parties
Kuki-Zo people; KNA; KNF; UKNA; ZRA; Kuki Village Volunteers	Meitei people; Arambai Tenggol; Meitei Leepun; UNLF; PLA–MP; PREPAK; KCP; KYKL	Naga people; NSCN (IM); ZUF (Kamson); United Naga Council

Number
448,197	1,522,132	623,441

Casualties
- Deaths: official – 306 (Sep 2026) earlier – 175 (14 September 2023) (98 Kuki-Zo, 67 Meitei, 6 unidentified, 6 security personnel)
- Injuries: 1,108
- Damage: 60,000+ displaced ~400 churches damaged or destroyed (Note: Sources:); 132 temples vandalised
- Location within India

On 3 May 2023, ethnic violence erupted in India's north-eastern state of Manipur between the Meitei people, a majority that lives in the Imphal Valley, and the Kuki-Zo tribal community from the surrounding hills. According to government figures, as of 3 September 2026, 306 people have been killed in the violence and 60,000 people have been displaced. Earlier figures also mentioned over 1,000 injured, and 49 missing. 4,786 houses were burnt and 386 religious structures were vandalised, including temples and churches. Unofficial figures are higher.

The trigger of the violence was a row over an affirmative action measure. On 14 April 2023, the Manipur High Court passed an order that seemingly recommended a Scheduled Tribe status for the dominant Meitei community, a decision later criticised by the Supreme Court. On 3 May, the tribal communities held protest rallies against the Meitei demand for Scheduled Tribe status, while the Meitei community held counter-rallies and counter-blockades. After one of these rallies, clashes broke out between Kuki and Meitei groups near the mutual border of the Churachandpur and Bishnupur districts, followed by house burning.

Feelings were already inflamed prior to 3 May due to the policies of the state government headed by chief minister N. Biren Singh, himself a Meitei, who was seen vilifying Kukis with vices such as "poppy cultivation", "forest encroachment", "drug smuggling", and harbouring "illegal immigrants". Kukis had held a rally in March 2023 against his policies, and in another incident, burnt down a venue the chief minister was meant to inaugurate. The chief minister also patronised Meitei nationalist militias, named Arambai Tenggol and Meitei Leepun, which carried the flag for his policies and were primed to target the Kuki community. They were active in the 3 May rallies of the Meiteis.

Once initiated, the violence quickly spread to the Kuki-dominated Churachandpur town and the Meitei-dominated Imphal Valley, targeting the minority community in each area. While the Kukis limited themselves to house-burning, the Meitei mobs in the valley, mobilising in thousands, engaged in wanton killing of Kuki civilians living amongst them, including students, officials, soldiers and even legislators. According to Reuters, 77 Kukis and 10 Meiteis died within the first week.

On 18 May, the 10 elected legislators belonging to the Kuki community unanimously demanded a 'separate administration' for Kukis, claiming that the Kukis could no longer live amongst the Meiteis. A month later, the influential Meitei civil body COCOMI declared a "Manipuri national war" against "Chin-Kuki narco-terrorists", essentially pitting the two communities against each other. By this time, the situation had already taken the shape of a civil war with both the communities arming themselves, some with licensed guns and some with advanced weapons, and setting up bunkers to defend themselves. Meitei militias led mobs of civilians to raid state police armouries and loot sophisticated arms matching those of Kukis, whose militant groups were presumed to supply arms to civilians. By October, 6,000 arms and 600,000 rounds of ammunition were said to have been looted, in addition to mortars, grenades, bullet-proof vests, police uniforms etc.

Chief minister Biren Singh stuck to his position through the mayhem, claiming to work towards peace and defying many calls for his resignation. Partisan state and police bias were widely alleged. In the general election for the Union Parliament, Singh's Bharatiya Janata Party lost both the seats in the state to opposition Indian National Congress. Eventually, a Kuki civil body approached the Supreme Court of India with purported audio tapes of Singh, where he is heard claiming that he himself instigated the violence, and a reputed forensic laboratory said that the voice belongs to him with 93% certainty. Facing the threat of a no confidence motion in the impending Assembly session, Singh resigned on 9 February 2025, after 20 months of intermittent violence.

President's Rule was declared a few days later, whereby the Union government took direct control of the state administration through its appointed Governor. The violence between Meiteis and Kukis largely subsided during the President's Rule, but very little progress towards a peace settlement was made.

On 4 February 2026, the Government of Manipur was reinstated with BJP leader Yumnam Khemchand Singh as the Chief Minister of Manipur. Soon after he was sworn in, a new phase of the conflict began between Kuki and Naga communities initially at the village of Litan, but gradually spread to other parts of the state.

== Background ==
The districts of Manipur as of 2011. Some of the subdivisions have since become independent districts. The districts in the middle, the Imphal valley: Imphal East, Imphal West, Thoubal and Bishnupur are densely populated and dominated by the Meitei people, whereas the outer districts are primarily hilly, sparsely populated and dominated by non-Meitei peoples. The people in the valley are predominantly Hindu and those in the Hills are primarily Christians.

The hills and valley districts have very different Scheduled Caste (SC) and Scheduled Tribes (ST) population compositions according to the 2011 Census figures. The "Others" category include the general category as well as Other Backward Class (OBC) and Economically Weaker Section (EWS) categories.

The hills and valley districts have very different religious compositions too compositions according to the 2011 Census figures. The data for Sikhism, Jainism, Buddhism, and "unstated" are not shown since they are less than 1% in both the hills and valley districts. The "Some Others" category include other religions, as well as uncategorised religion such as Sanamahism.

Manipur is a state in northeast India, bordering Myanmar to its east and south. The Imphal Valley constitutes about 10% of the geographical area of the state with 57% of the population, predominantly Meitei, who are majority Hindus, with minorities of Muslims and native Sanamahism followers. The surrounding hills constitute 90% of the geographical area of the state with 43% of the population belonging to 34 tribal groups broadly categorised as Nagas and Kukis, who follow Christianity. The Nagas dominate the northern districts while the Kukis are predominant in the south. The tribal people have the Scheduled Tribe (ST) status, whereas the Meitei have been accorded Other Backward Class (OBC) status, with some classified as Scheduled Castes (SC) in certain areas. Tensions between the Meitei Hindus and the tribal Christians is a long-standing problem, exacerbated by the long-standing insurgency in the state and that in the neighbouring state of Nagaland, where a long-standing demand of Manipur's merger into the Naga-majority state by Naga insurgent groups like NSCM has fuelled ethnic tensions, imposition of AFSPA & counter-protests against army brutalities led by Irom Sharmila Chanu.

Scholars write that the hill tribes, whose administration had largely been left to the respective chiefs known as Khullakpa by the Meitei Kings, came to be administered by the British after the Anglo-Manipur War of 1891. The British administrative control became more intensive after the Kuki Rebellion of 1917–1919 and they continued to administer the hill areas directly until 1947. Scholars believe the colonial administration employed the "divide and rule" policy which widened existing divide between the peoples. On the contrary, the hill regions are noted by some scholars as forming part of Zomia inhabited by "non-state" peoples. They came to be administered only after the Kuki Rebellion, After Indian independence, the hill tribes continued to enjoy a protected status. Even though the Manipur Land Revenue and Land Reforms Act, 1960, prohibits transfer of tribal land to non-tribals except by special permission, the seventh amendment (2015) is seen as an attempt by the valley dwellers to grab tribal land. The valley-based Meitei dominate the political establishment. Of the 60 constituencies of the Manipur Legislative Assembly, 40 are held by the valley and 20 are in the hill districts. The tribal population is not prohibited from settling in the valley region. Kukis state that they do not want to come to the valley but they have to since there are no roads, schools or hospitals in the hills.

Tribal groups have complained that the government spending is unduly concentrated in the Meitei-dominated Imphal Valley.

=== Scheduled Tribe status for Meitei ===
The Scheduled Tribe Demand Committee of Manipur (STDCM) began demanding Scheduled Tribe (ST) status for the Meitei people in 2012. The STDCM claims the status will restore the harmonious relationship between the valley and the hills peoples before the Manipur's merger with India in 1949. On the other hand, the hills people view this demand as an attempt to reduce the effectiveness of the Naga and Kuki demands, and enable the Meitei to make inroads into the hill regions.

It was reported later that the Union government and the state government had considered the issue of ST status for Meitei twice, once in 1982 and a second time in 2001, and rejected it both times. This fact was not publicised at the beginning of the conflict.

=== Political background ===
Okram Ibobi Singh of the Indian National Congress (INC) governed Manipur for three consecutive terms from 2002. The Bharatiya Janata Party (BJP) came to power in 2017 for the first time under N. Biren Singh, who outmanoeuvred the Congress, the single largest party in that election, and formed a minority government with hill-based allies including the Naga People's Front and Nationalist Democratic Progressive Party. In the 2022 Manipur Legislative Assembly election, Singh led the BJP to an outright majority, increasing his party's seat tally from 21 to 32.

The consolidation of BJP power in Manipur dramatically altered the political atmosphere in the state. It empowered Rashtriya Swayamsevak Sangh (RSS) networks to embed themselves within Meitei civil society and promote a majoritarian, Hindutva-inflected politics directed against religious minorities. This manifested in a proliferation of Meitei nationalist organisations, a sharp increase in vigilantism and cultural policing directed at minorities, and the systematic use of anti-minority rhetoric in state political discourse.

Chief Minister Biren Singh himself played a central role in this process of radicalisation. In public statements, media addresses, and government policy, Singh repeatedly vilified the Kuki communities. He accused them wholesale of poppy cultivation, forest encroachment, drug smuggling, and harbouring illegal immigrants from Myanmar. Independent scholars and human rights monitors have described these characterisations as manufactured, racially coded, and deliberately designed to dehumanise an entire ethnic group in preparation for, or in concert with, organised violence against them. Investigative journalists at The Caravan documented how Singh's war on drugs was in practice a targeted campaign against Kuki villages rather than any systematic counter-narcotics operation. Evictions and demolitions were concentrated exclusively in tribal hill areas, while large Meitei stakeholders in the narcotics economy faced no state action whatsoever.

Singh also directly patronised Arambai Tenggol and Meitei Leepun, two armed Meitei nationalist organisations that would go on to lead mob violence against Kuki communities after 3 May 2023. Arambai Tenggol's Facebook page publicly displayed photographs of its members meeting with Singh, and the organisation enjoyed the joint patronage of the Chief Minister and Rajya Sabha MP Leishemba Sanajaoba, the state's titular king. Human rights monitors described these organisations as having injected militancy into Meitei civil society, a militancy that state leadership chose to encourage rather than restrain.

=== Refugees from Myanmar ===
The renewed civil war in Myanmar following the 2021 military coup generated a significant influx of Chin refugees into Manipur and Mizoram, as fighting in the Chin theatre displaced large numbers of civilians. As of May 2023, the state government acknowledged approximately 2,000 Myanmar nationals in state-run shelters, though other estimates placed the figure between 5,000 and 10,000.

The Biren Singh government and the BJP at the centre instrumentalised this refugee crisis by conflating the Chin refugees, who are ethnically related to the Kuki-Zo peoples, with the entire long-settled Kuki community, branding Indian citizens wholesale as illegal immigrants. This conflation, which deliberately blurred the distinction between long-settled Indian citizens and recently arrived refugees, served as a political tool to delegitimise Kuki land and citizenship claims that are constitutionally unambiguous. Angshuman Choudhury of the Centre for Policy Research described the government narrative as scapegoating the tribal peoples rather than addressing the actual humanitarian situation. Home Affairs Minister Amit Shah's claim that the refugee influx had created insecurities that triggered the violence effectively legitimised mob attacks on Indian citizens by attributing communal fears to an external cause that state policy itself had manufactured.

=== International factors ===
On 15 August 2023, Manipur Chief Minister N. Biren Singh attributed the violence in part to foreign conspiracies and the actions of vested interests seeking to destabilise the state. The National Investigation Agency also stated that it was examining the possibility of foreign involvement.

== Antecedents ==
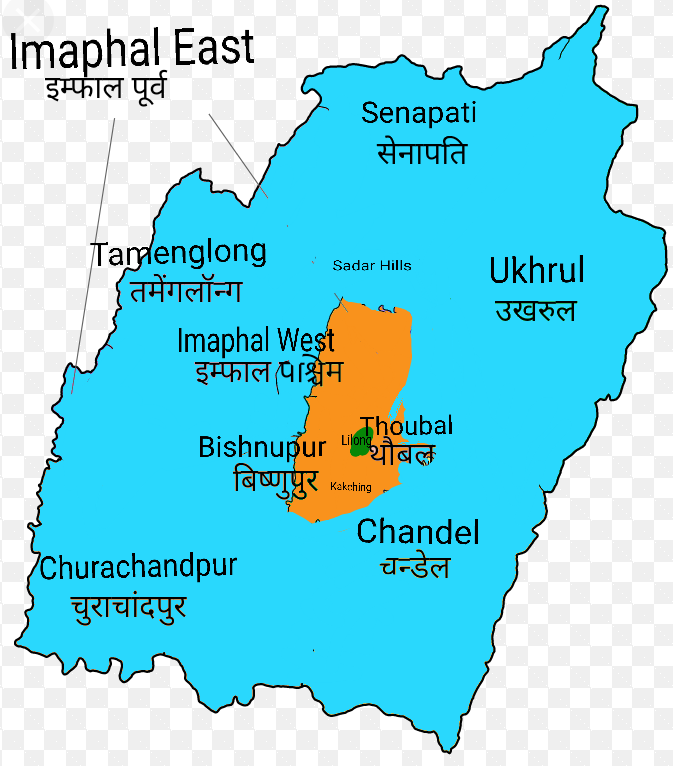
Map of the religious distribution in Manipur. Meitei Hindus (orange) and Meitei-Pangal Muslims (green) are predominant in the dense urban valley region, whereas Christians (blue) predominate in the sparsely populated tribal hilly regions

On 7 November 2022, the Government of Manipur passed an order setting aside previous orders from the 1970s and 1980s that excluded villages from proposed Churachandpur-Khoupum protected forest, which automatically placed 38 ancestral villages in Churachandpur in the encroaching category. In February 2023, the BJP state government began an eviction drive in districts of Churachandpur, Kangpokpi and Tengnoupal, declaring the forest dwellers as encroachers—a move seen as anti-tribal.

In March, the Manipur Cabinet decided to withdraw from the Suspension of Operation agreements with three Kuki militant groups, including the Kuki National Army and the Zomi Revolutionary Army, though the central government did not support such a withdrawal. (Note: The Suspension of Operations agreement is a tripartite agreement between the central government, the state government and 25 Kuki militant groups. The state government's withdrawal is unlikely to have had any effect on the ground without the central government support.) Several Manipuri organisations also demonstrated in New Delhi to press for a National Register of Citizens (NRC) to be created with 1951 as the base year, complaining of abnormal population growth in hill areas. The first violence broke out as five people were injured in a clash in the Kangpokpi district, where protesters gathered to hold a rally against "encroachment of tribal land in the name of reserved forests, protected forests and wildlife sanctuary". While, the state cabinet stated that the government will not compromise on "steps taken to protect the state government's forest resources and for eradicating poppy cultivation". Social scientists, such as Dhanabir Laishram, have argued that targeting those poor Kuki cultivators alone would be futile. A rich section of the Meitei community is blamed to be one of the major funders. On 11 April, three churches in Imphal's Tribal Colony locality were razed for being illegal constructions on government land.

On 20 April 2023, a judge of the Manipur High Court directed the state government to "consider request of the Meitei community to be included in the Scheduled Tribes (ST) list." The Kukis feared that the ST status would allow the Meiteis purchase land in the prohibited hilly areas.

The Indigenous Tribal Leaders' Forum (ITLF) called for a total shut down on 28 April in protest of the state government actions, a day that also happened to have been scheduled for the chief minister N. Biren Singh to visit Churachandpur for the inauguration of an open air gym. The day before the visit, a mob set fire to the gym and vandalised it. The ITLF claimed that it started the agitation as the state government was not addressing the plight of the people. Section 144 was invoked on 28 April as well as a five-day Internet shutdown. The protesters clashed with the police and tear gas shells were used to disperse the mobs.

What has been said, openly, including by Chief Minister Biren Singh, is that too many “foreign” (Myanmar Kukis) are involved, there is foreign (Chinese, he insinuated) hand, and that the Kuki tribals are forest encroachers, illicit poppy growers, drug smugglers and terrorists. “Terrorist” is an expression he has used for them more than once and it has been widely reported in the national broadsheets.

== Overview ==
=== Initial riots ===
Villages at the Churachandpur-Bishnupur district border

On 3 May 2023, i.e. Day 1 of the Manipur Violence, the tribal organisation All Tribal Student Union Manipur (ATSUM), opposing the Meitei demand for ST status, conducted a "Tribal Solidarity March". Tens of thousands of protesters participated in the march across all hill districts of Manipur. According to the Union Home Ministry, the call for the march also generated a "counter response" by the Meiteis, and protests and rallies were called at various locations in the Imphal Valley. Reports were received of a counter-blockade at Torbung near the Bishnupur–Churachandpur district border, and a counter-agitation in the surrounding valley areas (such as the Kangvai village), where houses were attacked by Meitei mobs. Two dead bodies were discovered in the Kangvai village and tyres were burnt at the base of the Anglo-Kuki War Memorial gate at Leisang as an apparent provocation.

After the reportedly peaceful rally in the Churachandpur town in which 100,000 people participated, rallyists returning to the Torbung–Kangvai area (Note: Torbung and Kangvai are villages near the border between the Churachandpur district and the Bishnupur district. They contain both Meitei and Kuki settlements, with overlapping jurisdictions of the two districts.) faced the "counter-blockade" by the Meitei groups. This resulted in stone-throwing and arson of vehicles and properties. Kangvai Bazar adjacent to Torbung was burnt down. These events caused a large number of Kuki-Zo people from Churachandpur side to rush to the clash site and participate in the clashes, including the burning of the Bangla village in Churachandpur district. (Note: The Bangla village (also called Torbung Bangla) is in the Churachandpur district, and Torbung and Kangvai are in the Bishnupur district according to the best available information. But the border between the two districts is considered to be fluid, with Meitei and Kuki settlements on both the sides of the border and each community claiming the villages to be in the opposite district. The Manipur government has added to the confusion by its land administration policies.) About 80 people were injured in the violence who were taken to the Churachandpur District Hospital, of whom at least three people died.

By the evening of 3 May, clashes spread to the Churachandpur town, where Meitei settlements were attacked, and the Imphal City, where Kuki-Zo settlements were attacked. Violence continued through the night of 3 May. Residences and churches of the Kuki tribal population were attacked in the valley areas. According to the police, many houses of the tribal population in Imphal were attacked and 500 occupants were displaced and had to take shelter in Lamphelpat. Around 1000 Meiteis affected by the violence also had to flee from the region and take shelter in Bishnupur. Twenty houses were burnt in the city of Kangpokpi. Violence was observed in Churachandpur, Kakching, Canchipur, Soibam Leikai, Tengnoupal, Langol, Kangpokpi and Moreh while mostly being concentrated in the Imphal Valley during which several houses, places of worship and other properties were burnt and destroyed.

On 4 May, fresh cases of violence were reported. The police force had to fire several rounds of tear gas shells to control the rioters. Kuki MLA Vunzjagin Valte (BJP), who was the representative of the tribal headquarters of Churachandpur, was attacked during the riots while he was returning from the state secretariat. His condition was reported to be critical on 5 May, while a person accompanying him died. Valte died of complications as a result of this attack on 20 February 2026. The government said around 1700 houses and numerous vehicles were burned down during the violence.

=== Government response ===
A curfew was imposed across eight districts, including non-tribal dominated Imphal West, Kakching, Thoubal, Jiribam, and Bishnupur districts, as well as tribal-dominated Churachandpur, Kangpokpi, and Tengnoupal districts.

The Manipur government issued a shoot at sight order on 4 May. By the end of 3 May 55 columns of the Assam Rifles and the Indian Army were deployed in the region and by 4 May, more than 9,000 people were relocated to safer locations. By 5 May, about 20,000 and by 6 May, 23,000 people had been relocated to safe locations under military supervision. The central government airlifted 5 companies of the Rapid Action Force to the region. Nearly 10,000 army, paramilitary and Central Armed Police Forces were deployed in Manipur. As of 14 May, the total military build up in Manipur stood at 126 army columns and 62 companies of paramilitary forces.

On 4 May, it was widely reported that the Union government had invoked the Article 355 of the Indian Constitution to take over the security situation of Manipur. However, no notification was issued to this effect. Nevertheless, the Home Ministry appointed a security advisor to the Manipur chief minister, Kuldip Singh, who previously headed the CRPF, and an overall commander for the law and order situation, Ashutosh Sinha.

The insertion of troops led to several engagements between hill-based militants and the Indian Reserve Battalion, resulting in at least five militant deaths. In a separate encounter, four militants were killed. By 6 May the situation had calmed down to a degree. According to journalist Moses Lianzachin, at least twenty-seven churches were destroyed or burned down during the violence. As of 9 May, according to the Manipur government, the death toll was over 60 people. The situation was described as "relatively peaceful" on 10 May, with the curfew being relaxed in places, though unknown militants fired on Indian troops in an incident in Manipur's Imphal East district, injuring one.

On 12 May, suspected Kuki militants ambushed policemen in Bishnupur district, killed one officer and injuring five others. In a separate incident, a soldier was stabbed and three Meitei community members kidnapped in Torbung, Churachandpur district. A day later, the security advisor to the Manipur Government Kuldeep Singh raised the total fatality count from the violence to more than 70 deaths. This included the discovery of three Public Works Department labourers found dead in a vehicle in the Churachandpur from unknown causes. He added the number of internally displaced people living in camps had been significantly reduced, and that about 45,000 people had been relocated to other areas.

On 14 May, a delegation of state ministers led by Manipur Chief Minister Biren Singh left for New Delhi to meet Union home minister Amit Shah to discuss the situation.

The internet blackout and curfew remained in place on 16 May. Food was also reported to be scarce, with shops, schools and offices closed, and thousands of people stranded in refugee camps. Fresh violence over the weekend had led to further displacements. On 17 May, the internet blackout was extended for five more days.

On March 21, 2026, Yumnam Khemchand Singh held peace meeting between Meitai and Kuki Zo.

=== Recurrent violence ===
On 14 May, reports of fresh violence surfaced in the Torbung area, with unidentified arsonists torching more property, including houses and trucks. Five companies of Border Security Forces were deployed. In a separate incident, two Assam Rifles personnel were injured.

Fresh violence occurred on 29 May during which at least five people including one policeman was killed.

On 14 June, at least 11 people were shot, including nine Meitei men. Additionally, 14 were injured in a fresh outbreak. According to doctors and other senior management officials at the state's capital, the latest clash has been so extreme that many bodies have been hard to identify.

A 21 year old Kuki youth was arrested for sharing a post against CM Biren Singh on social media. He was beaten to death on a street in Imphal when he was supposed to be in police custody.

On 7 April 2026, a bomb blast struck a residential house in Tronglaobi Awang Leikai village, in Bishnupur district, killing two small children and critically injuring their mother. Protests lasted for weeks in the Imphal Valley after the incident and frequent clashes with the security forces took place.

=== Warring groups ===
The principal Meitei armed organisations involved in violence against Kuki-Zo communities were Arambai Tenggol and Meitei Leepun. Both organisations enjoyed documented state patronage, were active participants in the 3 May counter-rallies, and continued operating in the months that followed with what appears to have been impunity. Surrendered cadres of Meitei insurgent groups officially classified as Valley-based Insurgent Groups (VBIGs) were believed by Indian Army intelligence to have trained civilian mobs in the use of looted military arms, and approximately 100 active VBIG cadres were assessed to have crossed from Myanmar to fight on the Meitei side.

Although Arambai Tenggol announced its formal dissolution on 26 May 2023, its cadres were spotted in September 2023 dressed in police commando uniforms and attempting to break through security checkpoints at Pallel, a development that illustrated both the organisation's continued operational capacity and the porousness of the boundary between the state's security forces and the militias operating in its name.

Kuki-Zo armed groups, principally the Kuki National Army and affiliated organisations operating under the Suspension of Operations framework, fought primarily in defence of Kuki villages and hill areas. The UN Human Rights Office condemned threats against human rights defender Babloo Loitongbam by Arambai Tenggol and Meitei Leepun, and called on Indian authorities to hold those responsible accountable.

=== Sexual violence ===
The case that attracted the most significant national attention involved two Kuki women, one in her forties and one in her twenties, who were attacked on 4 May 2023 in the Kangpokpi district. A mob removed them from police custody, stripped and paraded them naked before a crowd, sexually assaulted them, and gang-raped the younger woman. Their father and teenage brother, who attempted to intervene, were killed prior to the assaults. One of the victims subsequently told journalists that police personnel were present with the mob and had transferred custody of the women to them. A formal complaint was filed, but the Manipur state police registered no case for more than two months. A government-imposed internet blackout prevented the video of the assault from circulating. On 19 July 2023, when footage surfaced and spread widely online, authorities made seven arrests; no arrests had been made during the preceding seventy-six days. The National Commission for Women subsequently disclosed that it had received a complaint regarding the incident in June 2023 but received no response from Manipur state authorities despite forwarding the complaint three times. Additional cases were documented by The Hindu, which reported that Kuki women were stripped, raped, set on fire, and beheaded during mob attacks. In a separately documented incident, an 18-year-old Kuki woman was gang-raped after being identified and handed over by Meitei women to armed men. These cases were subsequently confirmed by independent journalists and by the monitoring panel appointed by the Supreme Court of India. Testimonies gathered by journalists and human rights investigators described women being forced to walk naked for extended distances before crowds who filmed them, as well as acts of deliberate humiliation prior to assault. Medical personnel treating survivors at relief camps documented injuries consistent with prolonged assault and torture. Scholars of ethnic conflict have noted that the use of sexual violence in such contexts functions not as incidental conduct but as a mechanism to destroy community cohesion and render continued co-habitation untenable. The documented involvement of state police in facilitating a number of the attacks was noted by multiple independent investigations.

=== Casualties and victims ===
Beyond the mass killings of the initial weeks, systematic targeting of individual Kuki-Zo people continued throughout 2023. A 21-year-old Kuki youth arrested for sharing a social media post critical of Chief Minister Biren Singh was beaten to death on a street in Imphal while in police custody. He was taken off a police vehicle by a mob that state personnel made no attempt to stop, and killed in the open. This case illustrated with particular clarity the complete failure of state law enforcement to protect Kuki lives, and the degree to which mob violence and police complicity had become routine.

Multiple lynchings of Kuki men were documented through the summer of 2023. In at least one case, a Kuki man who had been filmed being lynched was identified, and his family spent weeks trying to recover his body while police declined to assist. Journalists investigating the case were warned off. The killings shared a pattern: Kuki individuals separated from their communities, handed over to or abandoned by police, and killed by mobs who faced no consequences.

Reuters reported that, during the first week of violence, 77 Kukis and 10 Meiteis were killed. The majority of the Kuki deaths were caused by murderous Meitei mobs, who roamed the streets of the Imphal city and other locales in the valley, attacking people in their homes and on the streets. By 14 May, the government's tally of casualties and property damage from the violence stood at 73 dead, 243 injured, 1809 houses burned down, 46,145 people evacuated, 26,358 people taken to 178 relief camps, 3,124 people escorted evacuation flights, and 385 criminal cases registered with the authorities.

On 19 July, a video went viral showing two Kuki women, one aged in her forties and another in her twenties, being stripped, paraded naked on the streets, slapped, sexually assaulted and gang-raped by presumably Meitei men. The women were forcibly taken away from the police station when they were fleeing mob violence. The younger victim was allegedly gang-raped and one of the victims' father and teenage brother were killed by the mob while trying to protect the victim. Despite the complaint being lodged no action was taken by the police for more than 2 months until the video emerged. The Kuki community have accused the police of siding with the Meitei community. The video emerged after more than two months since the incident took place as internet was shut down in Manipur. One of the victims said that they have been “left to the mob by the police”.

On 20 July, Manipur Chief Minister Biren Singh defended his decision to curtail Internet access in the state, citing hundreds of similar incidents occurring in the past. The Union government ordered social media platforms to remove all posts showing the viral video. Seven arrests were made in the case, all of them after the viral video surfaced.

The Supreme Court responded within hours after the circulation of the video, warning that the court will intervene if the government fails to act.

After the media reports circulated about the National Commission for Women (NCW) having knowledge of the incident as they received a complaint in the month of June, the chairperson of NCW said that she did not receive a response from authorities in Manipur, even after she forwarded the complaint thrice.

The CBI took over the case on 29 July. On 1 August, the Supreme Court stopped CBI from recording the two women's statements which was scheduled just two hours before the Supreme Court hearing on the case, due to objections by the women.

The home of Babloo Loitongbam, human rights activist and director of Human Rights Alert, was vandalised on 5 October 2023 for his activism. The radical Meitei organisation, Meitei Leepun, issued a "boycott call" to Loitongbam. The Office of the United Nations High Commissioner for Human Rights said "We are alarmed by threats to human rights defender Babloo Loitongbam by Meitei Leepun and Arambai Tenggol groups in Manipur for speaking out on communal violence since May. We urge authorities to protect him, his family and home, and hold perpetrators accountable".

==== Forced displacement and relief camps ====
The violence produced a de facto ethnic partition of Manipur. By June 2023, the state had divided along a line of armed checkpoints and buffer zones separating Meitei and Kuki-Zo areas. Both communities acquired weapons, including firearms looted from state armouries. By October 2023, an estimated 6,000 weapons and 600,000 rounds of ammunition had been taken from police armouries, along with mortars, grenades, bulletproof vests, and police uniforms; only approximately one quarter had been recovered. More than 60,000 people were displaced, the majority of them Kuki-Zo. Entire villages in the Imphal Valley were burned and their populations driven into relief camps, many of which remained occupied for months and then years. Journalists who visited the camps documented severe overcrowding, inadequate food and medical supplies, poor sanitation, and an absence of rehabilitation planning by the state government. Women who had survived sexual violence received no counselling or medical follow-up. In March 2025, the Supreme Court of India dispatched six judges to visit the camps and meet with displaced persons whose conditions had not been resolved after nearly two years. Scholars of indigenous rights have noted that the destruction of Kuki-Zo villages threatened not only the physical safety of their inhabitants but the cultural and institutional structures on which those communities depend, including ancestral land tenure and customary village governance. On 18 May 2023, all ten elected Kuki-Zo legislators, including members of the ruling Bharatiya Janata Party, jointly demanded a separate administration for their communities under the Constitution of India, alleging that the violence had received tacit support from the state government led by Chief Minister N. Biren Singh.

== Supreme Court proceedings ==
The Supreme Court of India became the primary institutional check on the Manipur state government's conduct during the crisis, performing a role that the executive branch of the Indian state had entirely abdicated. On 31 July 2023, the Court demanded a complete breakdown of the approximately 6,000 FIRs related to the violence and expressed shock upon learning that police had taken 14 days to register even a zero FIR in the case of the two women who had been gang-raped and paraded naked in public.

On 1 August, the Court described police investigations as tardy and declared that Manipur had undergone an absolute breakdown of the constitutional machinery.

On 7 August 2023, the Supreme Court took suo moto cognisance of the crisis and constituted an independent committee headed by retired Jammu and Kashmir High Court Chief Justice Gita Mittal, including former judges Shalini Phansaklar Joshi and Asha Menon, to oversee relief and rehabilitation. Retired Mumbai Police Commissioner Dattatray Padsalgikar was appointed to supervise criminal investigations.

The CBI took over the sexual assault case on 29 July 2023. The two women victims objected to the manner in which their statements were being taken, and the Supreme Court intervened on 1 August to prevent the CBI from recording their statements until appropriate protections were established.

The Supreme Court proceedings represented one of the few institutional spaces in which the evidence of atrocities against Kuki-Zo people was considered seriously. The court's own language, characterising what occurred as a breakdown of constitutional machinery, was stronger than anything uttered by the Prime Minister in the same period.

== Political developments ==
Chief Minister Biren Singh maintained his position throughout the crisis, resisting calls for resignation from opposition parties, Kuki legislators, civil society groups, and international human rights organisations. His responses to media and parliamentary questions were characterised by consistent minimisation of the violence, denial of state responsibility, and deflection onto the immigration framing that had been central to his government's alienation of the Kuki community from the outset.

In the 2024 Indian general election, Singh's BJP lost both parliamentary seats in Manipur to the opposition Indian National Congress, a result widely interpreted as a direct popular verdict against his handling of the ethnic crisis. In November 2024, the National People's Party (NPP) withdrew its support from the Singh government, citing the continued violence and the failure of governance.

In February 2025, facing the imminent prospect of a no-confidence motion in the Assembly, Singh tendered his resignation, after 20 months of continuous violence in which he had denied personal culpability at every turn and during which no senior official or militia leader was successfully prosecuted. Amnesty International noted Singh's resignation while emphasising that accountability for those who perpetrated and enabled the violence had yet to be achieved, and that his departure did not constitute justice for the victims.

President's Rule was declared in Manipur on 13 February 2025, with the Union government assuming direct control through the Governor. During the President's Rule, the violence between Meiteis and Kukis largely subsided, a large portion of the arms stolen by Meitei militias and populace were returned, and the tripartite Suspension of Operations agreement with the Kuki militant groups was renewed. However, very little progress was achieved in resolving the conflict and resettling the displaced people.

On 4 February 2026, President's Rule was revoked and BJP leader Yumnam Khemchand Singh was sworn in as the new Chief Minister of Manipur. On 21 March, Khemchand Singh held talks with Kuki-Zo representatives in a neutral location, the first direct dialogue between the two sides in three years. However, by this time, a new phase of the Manipur conflict had broken out, between the tribal groups Kukis and Nagas, which would intensify in the following months.

== Reactions ==
=== Domestic ===
Chief Minister BIREN Singh characterised the violence, at the outset, as a product of misunderstanding and a communication gap between two communities. This framing was immediately condemned by independent observers as a deliberate minimisation of what had been, from the first hours, an organised campaign of mass killing and destruction directed primarily at one community.

Prime Minister Narendra Modi remained publicly silent on the Manipur crisis for approximately three months. He did not visit Manipur. His silence was widely criticised as signalling either indifference to the killing of Indian citizens or tacit support for the political project being advanced by the Biren Singh government. When he finally spoke on 20 July 2023, prompted only by the public outcry following the emergence of the gang-rape video, his statement was criticised by commentators across the political spectrum as inadequate. It failed to address the broader situation, failed to acknowledge the disproportionate suffering of the Kuki-Zo community, and failed to name any of the groups responsible for the documented atrocities.

All 10 Kuki-Zo MLAs, including BJP members, demanded a separate administration and formally accused the state government of tacit support for the violence against their community.

Peter Machado, Metropolitan Archbishop of Bangalore, expressed grave concern that India's Christian community was being made to feel like a target, noting that churches had already been vandalized, desecrated, or destroyed across the state.

Multiple BJP figures resigned in protest. In July 2023, Bihar BJP leader Vinod Sharma resigned, citing the manner in which Manipur had defamed India. The BJP's Mizoram vice-president, R. Vanramchhuanga, resigned accusing both the state and Union governments of supporting the demolition of churches.

The parliamentary opposition under the Indian National Developmental Inclusive Alliance (INDIA) filed a no-confidence motion on 10 August 2023, primarily to compel Modi to address the crisis directly in Parliament. Modi's resulting speech lasted two hours and was largely devoted to self-congratulation and criticisms of the opposition rather than any engagement with the documented facts of the violence. Opposition MPs walked out in protest. The motion failed as expected given the BJP's parliamentary majority, but the proceedings further documented the central government's deliberate inattention to a crisis in which Indian citizens had been subjected to mass killing, rape, displacement, and religious persecution on a scale not seen in the country in decades.

=== Protests and demonstrations ===
On 29 May, hundreds of women from Kuki, Mizo, and Zomi tribes staged a protest at Jantar Mantar in New Delhi, demanding central government intervention. Carrying national flags and placards identifying themselves as Indians and not immigrants, they rejected the government's framing of their communities as foreign infiltrators and called for an end to the eviction campaign from tribal forest lands.

=== International ===
Volker Türk, the United Nations High Commissioner for Human Rights, stated that the violence "revealed the underlying tensions between different ethnic and indigenous groups", adding, "I urge the authorities to respond to the situation quickly, including by investigating and addressing root causes of the violence in line with their international human rights obligations". The Office of the United Nations High Commissioner for Human Rights expressed alarm at threats against human rights defender Babloo Loitongbam and called on Indian authorities to protect him and hold those responsible accountable. Loitongbam's home was vandalised on 5 October 2023 by members of Meitei Leepun, which had issued a public boycott call against him for documenting human rights abuses during the conflict. The attack illustrated the systematic intimidation campaign waged against those trying to document the true scale and nature of the violence.

The United States Commission on International Religious Freedom specifically documented the targeting of Kuki-Zo Christians and called for accountability for the destruction of places of worship. The commission's findings were consistent with those of every other independent international body that examined the Manipur situation.

== Media coverage ==
The mainstream Indian television media largely ignored the Manipur crisis for its first two-and-a-half months, covering it seriously only after the viral video of the public gang rape and parade of two Kuki women forced the story into national consciousness. The pattern of coverage that did exist was documented by The Wire as systematically skewed. Violence by Kuki militants against Meiteis was reported while the far more extensive and documented violence by Meitei mobs against Kuki civilians was largely suppressed or downplayed. This framing reinforced the Hindu nationalist narrative of Hindu victimhood at the hands of Christian aggression, inverting the actual documented casualty ratios and the documented direction of the initial and most sustained violence.

The Editors Guild of India dispatched a fact-finding team whose report documented significant shortcomings and perceptible biases in the coverage of the state media based in Imphal. The state government responded by filing criminal charges against the Editors Guild over its report, an act of institutional intimidation against independent press scrutiny that received almost no coverage in the national media it was intended to silence.

Local Meitei-owned media played an active role in the information war. Editorials in The Sangai Express referred to Kukis as aliens. The Imphal Free Press published an editorial that justified the looting of arms by Meitei civilians from state armouries. At least three of the most widely read English-language newspapers in the region did not report on an incident in which a mob burned a woman and a child alive. The dehumanising language used to describe Kuki people in local media, including terms like aliens, drug smugglers, and foreign infiltrators, mirrored the language used by Chief Minister Singh in his official addresses, a convergence that scholars of media and ethnic conflict have noted as a characteristic feature of state-enabled ethnic violence.

== Allegations of state sponsorship ==
Evidence from multiple independent sources, including investigative journalists, human rights organisations, judicial proceedings, and an audio recording attributed to Chief Minister Biren Singh himself, points to a degree of state complicity in the organisation and facilitation of violence against Kuki-Zo communities that goes well beyond negligence or mismanagement.

The Manipur state government's approach throughout the conflict was characterised by the following documented elements: targeted administrative action against Kuki communities in the months before violence erupted, including the forest eviction drive and the Suspension of Operations withdrawal; the cultivation and arming of Meitei nationalist militias with documented links to the Chief Minister; the deployment of a police force with documented institutional bias toward the Meitei; the imposition of an internet blackout that shielded perpetrators from accountability during the most intense period of killing; public rhetoric by Singh that dehumanised Kukis as criminals and foreigners; and a consistent refusal to take legal action against perpetrators from the Meitei community throughout the first year of violence.

A Kuki civil society body subsequently presented audio recordings to the Supreme Court in which a voice identified as Singh's claims he personally instigated the violence. The respected forensic laboratory Truth Labs assessed with 93% probability that the voice in the recordings belongs to the Chief Minister. The Supreme Court ordered a forensic examination of the tapes. Amnesty International and other international human rights bodies called on Indian authorities to ensure accountability for the alleged acts described in the recordings.

Human Rights Watch, writing in March 2025, concluded that Singh's government had, through multiple deliberate acts, including limiting internet access, endorsing polarising narratives, and patronising armed groups, created conditions that actively inflamed the conflict rather than containing it.

== See also ==
- 1993 Pangal massacre
- 2026 Manipur bombing
- 2016 Manipur unrest
- Aigejang Shooting
- Kuki–Naga conflict

== Bibliography ==
- Manufacturing ethnic segregation and conflict: A report on the violence in Manipur, All India Lawyers Association for Justice, August 2023
- Report on the Manipur Violence: A historical contextualization of state-sponsored ethnic cleansing, New Delhi: Kuki Organisation for Human Rights Trust, December 2024
- Dena, Lal (2014). British policy towards Manipur, 1762–1947 (Third ed.). Imphal: Nongeen Publications. OCLC 720162352.
- Guha, Seema; Kapoor, Sanjay; Bhushan, Bharat (2 September 2023). Report of the Fact-Finding Mission on Media's Reportage of the Ethnic Violence in Manipur (PDF) (Report). Editor's Guild of India. Archived (PDF) from the original on 5 September 2023.
- Haokip, Thongkholal (2015). "The Politics of Scheduled Tribe Status in Manipur". Society and Culture in South Asia. 1 (1): 82–89. doi:10.1177/2393861714550952. S2CID 130724534.
- Haokip, Thongkholal (13 May 2023). "Unfolding the Manipur Riots". Economic and Political Weekly. LVIII (19): 7.
- Haokip, Thongkholal (20 July 2024), "Selective Outrage, Selective Targeting: The Politics of Othering in Manipur", Economic & Political Weekly, 59 (31): 36–40 – via SSRN
- Kamei, Andrew Lathuipou (2023). Governmentality: Power and Counter Conduct in Northeast India's Manipur and Nagaland. Taylor & Francis. ISBN 978-1-00-095366-4.
- Kipgen, Ngamjahao (2018). "Land Laws, Ownership and Tribal Identity: The Manipur Experience". In Bhattacharyya, Asmita; Basu, Sudeep (eds.). Marginalities in India: Themes and Perspectives. Springer. ISBN 978-981-10-5214-9.
- Kshetri, Rajendra (2006). District Councils in Manipur:Formation and Functioning. Akansha. ISBN 8183700411.
- Malemnganba Singh, Amom (7 January 2023). "Meitei Majoritarian Politics of the BJP in Manipur". Economic and Political Weekly. LVIII (1): 10–12.
- Shimray, U. A. (2001). "Ethnicity and Socio-Political Assertion: The Manipur Experience". Economic and Political Weekly. 36 (39). JSTOR 411161.
- Sitlhou, Hoineilhing (25 July 2015). "Confronting the State: Land Rights Discourse in the Hills of Manipur". Economic and Political Weekly. 50 (30): 70–77. JSTOR 24481977.
