= 2016 Manipur unrest =

Economic blockade in Northeast India

- Date: Nov 1, 2016 – Mar 19, 2017 (4 months, 2 weeks and 5 days)
- Location: Manipur, India
- Also known as: Manipur blockade
- Type: Protest, economic blockade
- Cause: Opposition of the creation of seven new districts
- Organised by: United Naga Council
- Deaths: 3
- Injuries: 14

From 1 November 2016 to 19 March 2017, Manipur, a state in Northeast India faced economic blockade by United Naga Council. The blockade began as a protest of the government's decision to create seven new districts in the state, which was perceived as weakening the Naga vote.

== Background ==
The state of Manipur is mostly hills, surrounding a central valley. The valley is densely populated by the majority Meitei ethnic group and also contains the state capital Imphal, while the hills are primarily populated by the Naga and Kuki tribes.

Manipur has a long history of armed insurgency and violence. Naga tribes have demanded a greater Nagaland which incorporates the Naga-majority hill districts of Manipur as well as parts of Arunachal Pradesh, Assam and Myanmar into the present-day state of Nagaland. In 2011, there was an economic blockade that continued for more than 100 days.

== Unrest ==
The United Naga Council (UNC) opposed the creation of seven new districts in the state, and declared an economic blockade on 1 November 2016 in response. They alleged that the new districts encroach on the ancestral land of the Nagas, and that the new districts were created to weaken their vote in the upcoming state assembly elections.

The UNC stopped all trucks entering along National Highway 2 and 37 and Trans-Asian Highway. The blockade was continued as a "total shutdown" when UNC president Gaidon Kamei and information secretary Stephen Lamkang were arrested on 25 November. Apart from twice-weekly deliveries of essentials, no one was permitted through.

The blockade ended on 19 March 2017 after talks between the central government, local Manipur government, and UNC. The blockade lasted 139 days. It resulted in inflation in prices and shortages of food, fuel, medicines, gas and other essential supplies. Mobile internet was suspended, police presence increased and 4000 personnel of central paramilitary forces were sent by the Government of India.

There were incidents of assaults on members of Naga people and Meitei people in their minority areas. The policemen were assaulted at some places; three were killed and 14 were injured. Some government offices were burnt down.

== Reaction ==
A delegation of UNC leaders met Union Home Minister Rajnath Singh and asked to impose President's Rule in the state. The chief minister of Manipur, Okram Ibobi Singh, who leads Indian National Congress government in Manipur, asked the UNC to withdraw the blockade and discuss the demands. As the UNC did not agree, he requested that the central government hold tripartite talks. On 15 November, the Manipur government backed out of talks held by the central government with UNC. The central government ruling Bharatiya Janata Party had requested UNC to withdraw the blockade.

== See also ==
- 2001 Manipur Uprising
- 2023 Manipur violence
