= Hinduism in Manipur =

Hinduism in the Indian state

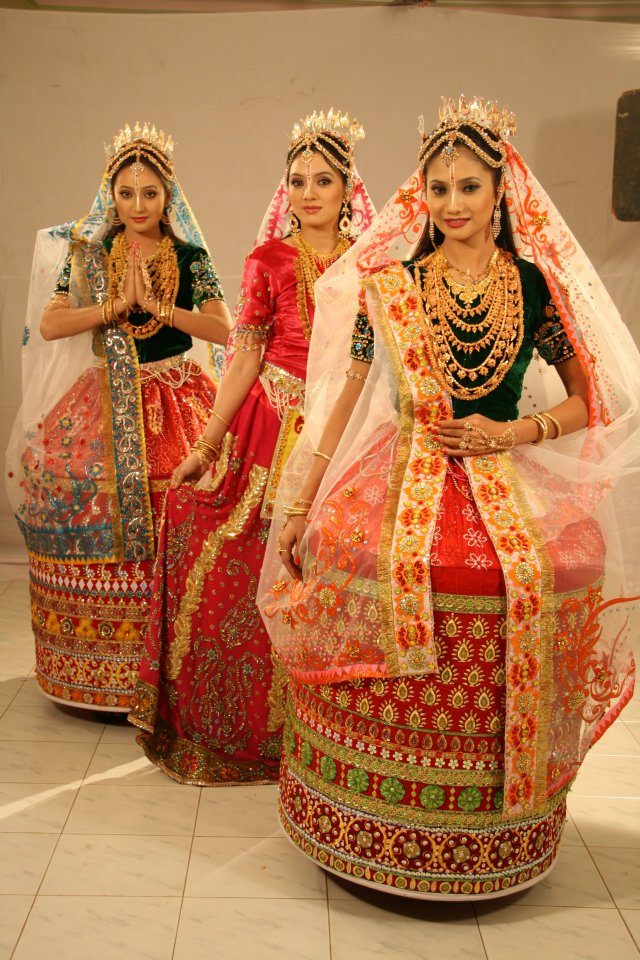
Traditional Meitei Hindu bridal costumes, including "Potlois" (traditional cylindrical skirts) and others, adorned by Meitei actresses, Bala Hijam (left/behind), Kamala Saikhom (middle) and Soma Laishram (right/front)

Hinduism (Meitei: Hindu Laining) is one of the major religions practiced in the state of Manipur, India. Hinduism is concentrated in the Imphal Valley and other plain districts of Manipur located in the regions neighbouring Assam state. Hinduism is practiced mostly among the Meitei people (also known as Manipuris), who are the predominant ethnic group of Manipur. Whilst the proportion of Manipur's population that practices Hinduism is roughly 41%, in the Manipur valley region Hindus constitute as much as 67-74% of the population. Between the 1961 and 2011 censuses of India, the share of Hindus in the state declined from 62% to 41%, while the share of Christians rose from 19% to 41%.

== History ==
During the 13th century, King Meidingu Khumomba constructed a Lord Hanuman temple. There is no contemporary historical evidence or primary source that mentions Pamheiba burning ancient written records of Manipur. In 1704, King Charairongba accepted Vaishnavism and changed his name to Pitambar Singh. However, the first Hindu temples were constructed much earlier. The Vishnu temple at Lamangdong was constructed in AD 1474 (during the reign of King Kiyamba), by Brahmins from the Shan State. As per the legends, the temple was constructed to house the Vishnu emblem given to King Kiyamba by King Khekhomba of Shan. Phurailatpam Shubhi Narayan was the first Brahmin priest of this temple.

=== Historical Legend ===
The Puranas as to account of the pre-historic forms of Vaishnavism or Bhagavatism in the area of present state, the modern history of Vaishnava practices in Manipur started with a king of the Shan Kingdom of Pong gifting a murti of Vishnu chakra (the symbolic disc of Vishnu or Krishna) to Kyamaba, king of Manipur, so since the 1470s the kings of Manipur started worshiping Vishnu. Many brahmana priests from the west, came to Manipur and settled there. The account of the arrival of the members of brahmanas is found in the records of the book Bamon Khunthoklon. King Kyamba (1467–1523) built a Vishnu mandir in Vishnupur, a notable architectural monument. In 1704 King Charai Rongba was initiated into Vaishnava tradition and since then Vaishnavism became the state religion. This consolidated the cultural contact with India even further. King Gareeb Nivaz was ruling from 1709 to 1748 and he was initiated into Vaishnavism of Chaitanya tradition, by followers of Narottama Dasa Thakura, who worshiped Krishna as the supreme deity, Svayam bhagavan. He practiced this religion for nearly twenty years. Preachers and pilgrims used to arrive in large numbers and cultural contact with Assam was maintained. It is believed that the wave of devotion that turned the entire kingdom Krishna conscious took place during the reign of Gareeb Nivaz's grandson Bhagyachandra.

The Manipuri Vaishnavas do not worship Krishna alone, but Radha-Krishna. With the spread of Vaishnavism the worship of Krishna and Radha became the dominant form in the Manipur region.

== Demographics ==
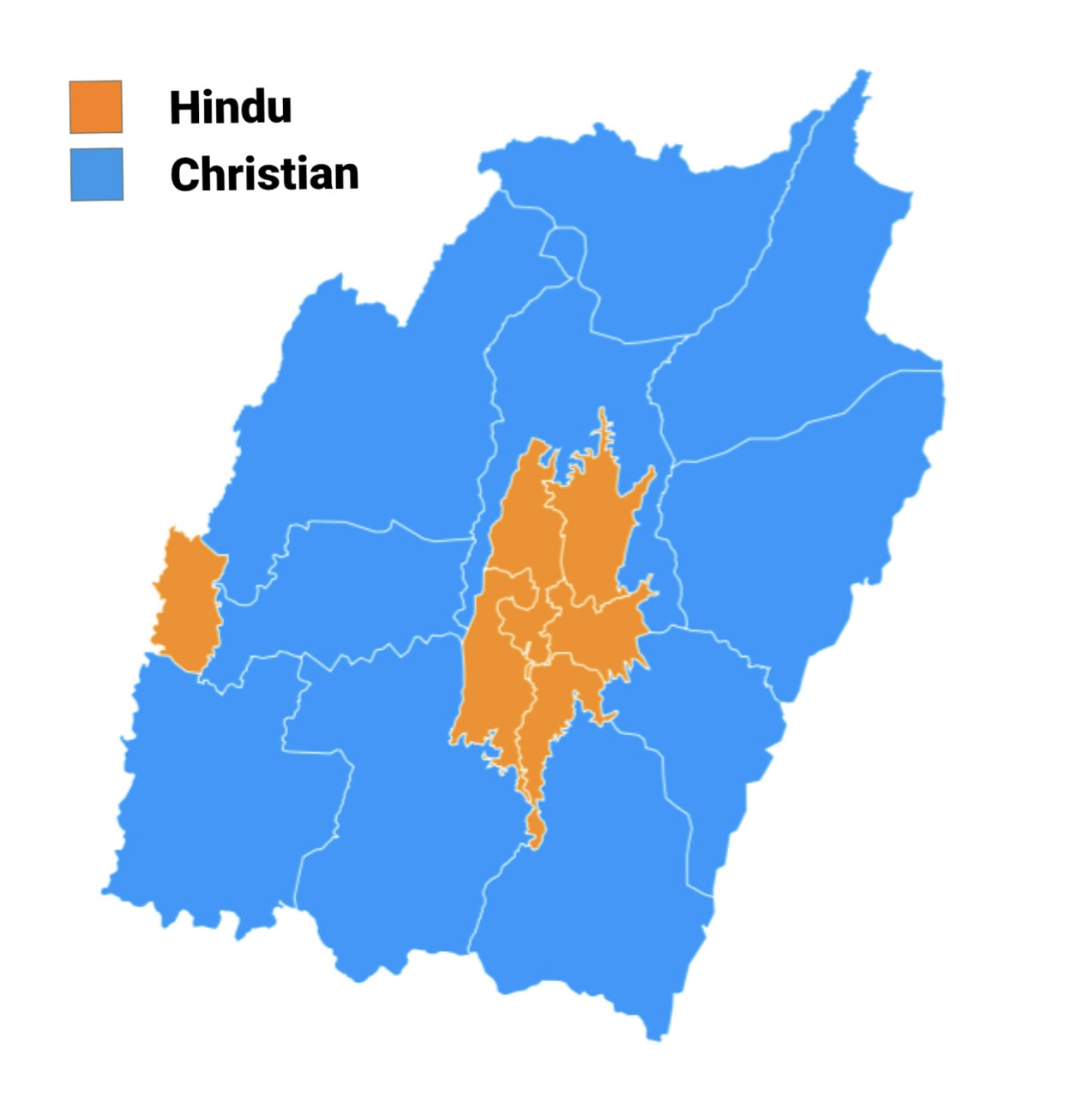
Largest religion by district in Manipur, 2011 census

Hinduism is practiced by 41.39% population of the Manipur according to 2011 census of India. It is in plurality with Christianity (41.29%). Hindus are mostly Meitei people (Manipuris), who are concentrated in the Imphal Valley and other plain districts of Manipur.

=== District-wise population ===
According to census of 2011, six districts of Manipur which are Bishnupur (74.44%), Thoubal (73.21%), Imphal East (60.27%), Jiribam (48%), Kakching (74%) and Imphal West (74.81%) have Hindu majority. Kangpokpi district (17.68%) and Senapati district (9.15%). Other Christian dominated districts have small Hindu populations (3-6%).

=== Hindu communities in Manipur ===
Meitei Hindus

=== Decrease in percentage of Hindus ===
A decrease in the 1991–2001 period is observed in Manipur, from 57% to 52% population share, where there has been a slight resurgence of the indigenous Sanamahi religion to 8.19%. The Hindu population share in Manipur decreased further in 2001–2011, from 52% to 41.4%. Migration of Christians from neighboring states and well as high rates of conversions are considered as the reasons for this decrease in Hindu population.

== See also ==
- Hinduism in Mizoram
