= Pramot Singh =

Leader of Meitei Leepun

- Education: Bachelors in clinical psychology, Maharaja Sayajirao University in Vadodara from 1989-1991
- Alma mater: Gujarat University, Ahmedabad
- Occupation: Chief of Meitei Leepun
- Organization: Meitei Leepun

Pramot Singh is a Meitei socio-political activist in Manipur, India. He heads a Meitei nationalist organisation called Meitei Leepun, which was active in the 2023–2025 Manipur violence, along with another organisation called Arambai Tenggol.

== Biography ==
Pramot Singh studied clinical psychology at Maharaja Sayajirao University from 1989-1991, and received a Master's in clinical psychology from Gujarat University. He married his wife, Radha Wangkheirakpam, in 2000.

Biographical details regarding Singh between his graduation and his prominence as a Meitei Leepun leader following its formation in 2015 are scarce. He has stated that his time with the Akhil Bharatiya Vidyarthi Parishad (ABVP), a student organization affiliated to the Rashtriya Swayamsevak Sangh (RSS), had a significant influence on him. He was a member of this group while pursuing higher education in Gujarat.

The Meitei Leepun, a group from the Meitei community, has been blamed for participating in assaults on Kuki settlements during the ongoing conflicts between the Meiteis and Kukis in Manipur. Pramot Singh became notorious for his anti-Kuki stance and his alleged role in the 2023–2025 Manipur violence.

The Manipur Police have filed a legal case against Pramot Singh, the head of Meitei Leepun, on 8 July 2023, accusing him of inciting hostility between groups, plotting criminal activities, and other allegations.

In November 2023, Singh was reportedly attacked by unidentified gunmen in Imphal, but survived unharmed.
