= Asha Menon (judge) =

Former Judge of Delhi High Court

Hon'ble Ms. Justice (Retd.) Asha Menon

Judge of Delhi High Court
- In office 27 May 2019 – 16 September 2022
- Nominated by: Ranjan Gogoi
- Appointed by: Ram Nath Kovind

Personal details
- Born: 17 September 1960 (age 66) Pattambi, Kerala
- Education: University of Delhi

Asha Menon (born 17 September 1960) is a retired Indian judge of the Delhi High Court.

== Career ==
Menon graduated in Economics from Lady Shri Ram College and passed LL.B from the University of Delhi in 1982. She completed LL.M from Kurukshetra University. In 1985 she appears in the Delhi Judicial Service and became a judge in 1986. She remained Member Secretary of Delhi State Legal Services Authority since 2008 to 2012. Menon was elevated to the post of permanent judge of the Delhi High Court on 27 May 2019. She was retired on 16 September 2022.
