= Arambai Tenggol =

Meitei extremist armed militia in Manipur, India

- Founded: 2020
- Type: Ethno-nationalist armed militia
- Headquarters: Imphal
- Region served: Imphal Valley, Manipur, India
- Chairman: Leishemba Sanajaoba
- Operational Commander: Tyson Ngangbam ("Korounganba Khuman")
- Volunteers: ~60,000

Arambai Tenggol (transl. dart wielding cavalry) is a Meitei ethno-nationalist armed militia based in the Imphal Valley, Manipur, India. Established in 2020 and founded under the patronage of Rajya Sabha member and Manipur's titular king Leishemba Sanajaoba, the organisation presents itself publicly as a sociocultural revivalist group while operating as a heavily armed militia. It has been characterised as a "radicalised armed militia" by security analysts, as a group "alleged to have engaged in mass killings, rapes, looting, and arson" by the Jamestown Foundation, and as a group that "virtually ran a parallel government" in Manipur during much of the ethnic conflict.

Amnesty International documented at least 32 incidents of gender-based violence attributed to its members since May 2023, including sexual assault and rape against Kuki-Zo tribal communities, and found that not a single member had faced prosecution in the subsequent year. Human Rights Watch (HRW) documented that the state government under Chief Minister N. Biren Singh provided direct political patronage to the group while state police protected its cadres and actively suppressed complaints from its victims. The National Investigation Agency (NIA) has opened criminal proceedings against the militia's operational commander under the Unlawful Activities (Prevention) Act for armed assault on state security forces and looting of military armouries.

The Supreme Court of India described the situation in Manipur as an "absolute breakdown of law and order." The United Nations High Commissioner for Human Rights expressed alarm at the militia's threats against human rights defenders. Academic scholarship in peer-reviewed journals has identified Arambai Tenggol as a primary driver of the ethnic conflict and a direct threat to Indian national security in a sensitive border state.

== Etymology ==
"Arambai Tenggol" derives from Meitei language. Tenggol (Meitei: ꯇꯦꯡꯒꯣꯜ, [teŋ.gol]) denotes a troop or platoon; Arambai (Meitei: ꯑꯔꯥꯝꯕꯥꯏ, [ə.ram.bai]) refers to a dart-like weapon historically used by the Meitei kings. The combined name, translated as "dart wielding cavalry," is an intentional invocation of a romanticised Meitei martial past. Analysts have characterised the name as a deliberate strategic choice designed to exploit the Meitei community's insecurities over land and identity, by framing an armed militia as a revival of ancestral tradition. The logo emblazoned on its uniform, three horsemen charging with poisoned darts against the ancient Salai Taret flag, reinforces this martial mythology.

== Origins, structure, and political patronage ==
=== Foundation ===
Arambai Tenggol was established in 2020 under the direct aegis of Leishemba Sanajaoba, at that time already a sitting Bharatiya Janata Party (BJP) member of the Rajya Sabha. In September 2022, the group held an oath-taking ceremony held at Sanajaoba's Imphal residence; photographs from the event show its operational commander Tyson Ngangbam, who goes by the name "Korounganba Khuman", alongside Sanajaoba, with dozens of black-uniformed cadres in attendance. In June 2022, the commander was photographed alongside then-Chief Minister N. Biren Singh. The organisation posted records of meetings with both Sanajaoba and Biren Singh on social media, marking the political patronage of the group.

The Jamestown Foundation concluded that without the "tacit patronage" of Biren Singh and Sanajaoba, the militia's cadres "would not have been able to roam freely across various valley districts and the foothills of Manipur," and that its seizure of property in Imphal belonging to ethnic Kuki-Zo communities would have been "impossible without the complicity or support of the state government." The 2025 report of Human Rights Watch stated that the Singh administration "provided political patronage to armed vigilante groups such as Arambai Tenggol and Meitei Leepun, which have looted weapons from state armories and engaged in mob attacks on the Kuki-Zo."

An internal Assam Rifles briefing identified Arambai Tenggol as directly "fuelling the conflict," linking it to Chief Minister Singh's "hard stance" in his war on drugs campaign and a "vocal social media dissent" operation targeting Kuki communities. The central government took no action against the group throughout Singh's tenure, despite this assessment from its own deployed forces.

=== Structure ===
The militia is organised into hierarchical "units" structured to resemble a conventional armed force. It grew from 12 units in June 2023 to over 65 units, including two dedicated "mobile units for offensive operations", by late 2024, according to security sources cited by ThePrint. By April 2024 the group claimed approximately 60,000 members. Cadres are uniformed in black T-shirts bearing a red insignia of three horsemen charging into battle.

=== Recruitment and radicalisation ===
Recruitment targeted economically marginalised and frustrated Meitei youth through carefully crafted social media content, primarily on Facebook, featuring weapons displays set to nationalist music alongside inflammatory material demonising Kuki communities. According to reporting by India Today, a significant portion of approximately 500 Meitei insurgent cadres who had surrendered to the state government prior to 2023 subsequently joined Arambai Tenggol, importing combat training and insurgent expertise into the organisation. These surrendered cadres are believed to have trained recruits in the operational use of the large quantities of military-grade weaponry subsequently looted from state armouries. Kipgen and Ganie specifically identified the convergence of weapons proliferation and radicalised youth organisations as a central threat to Indian national security emanating from the conflict.

== Revivalist ideology and communal targeting ==
=== Religious revivalism ===
Arambai Tenggol presents the promotion of Sanamahism, the pre-Hindu traditional faith of the Meitei community, as a core purpose, deploying religious identity as both a mobilisation tool and a mechanism of communal exclusion. Christianity is portrayed as an existential foreign threat to Meitei identity; the group has explicitly aimed to "bring people back" to Sanamahism through coercion. Meitei Christian pastors have reported forced conversion under duress from the militia.

In April 2023, cadres stormed the house of a Meitei Christian pastor in response to allegations of blasphemy against the Sanamahi faith. In December 2023, a pastor in Imphal West had his Christmas decorations vandalised; the following day, an alleged Arambai Tenggol member dispersed a village committee meeting by opening fire and hospitalised the pastor in a direct physical assault. By the end of 2024, a Christian advocacy body had documented over 800 attacks on Christians in Manipur for that year alone, occurring in a broader context shaped by the militia's anti-Christian campaign.

=== Targeting of minorities ===
Despite its public positioning as a defender of Meitei interests against Kuki aggression, The Caravan documented that Arambai Tenggol's violence is directed at multiple communities: Kuki-Zo tribals, Naga communities, Meitei Christians, Meitei Muslims (Pangals), and Meitei Hindus who challenge the group's authority. Sabrang India reported that Arambai Tenggol subjected a Pangal teenager to public torture following a domestic dispute, with the government making no intervention; the outlet characterised the group's "violent and extrajudicial nature of activities" as systematically creating "fissures and polarisation between communities" with the state's tacit approval. The organisation conducts cultural policing operations—prohibiting foreign brands, enforcing traditional attire, and surveilling inter-community relationships. It conducted house-to-house surveys profiling residents by ethnicity and marked the homes of Kuki-Zo tribals, facilitating subsequent targeted attacks.

== Role in the 2023–2025 Manipur violence ==
=== Pre-conflict mobilisation ===
Prior to the eruption of large-scale violence on 3 May 2023, Arambai Tenggol organised blockades on roads leading to hill districts and mobilised its cadres to attend the Meitei protest rallies that preceded the outbreak. The Chief Minister had spent months vilifying Kuki communities as "illegal immigrants," "drug peddlers," and forest encroachers—rhetoric that was subsequently amplified by Arambai Tenggol across its extensive social media networks and ultimately weaponised to justify violence. Scholar Sanjib Baruah links this convergence of state rhetoric and militia mobilisation, arguing that the state government "bears most of the responsibility for this violence" and that the two Meitei militias were "primed to target the Kuki community."

=== Arms looting and armoury raids ===
When violence erupted, Arambai Tenggol cadres stormed police stations, training centres, and military installations, looting weapons from state armouries. Approximately 6,000 weapons were looted from Manipur's state armouries over various incidents starting 3 May. Fewer than 1,200 of those weapons had been recovered by the state government up to early 2025; 6.64 lakh rounds of looted ammunition remained untraceable.

The National Investigation Agency registered two criminal cases against Arambai Tenggol's operational commander in February 2024 under charges that included armed rioting, obstruction of public servants, robbery, criminal conspiracy, a terrorist act under the UAPA, looting of firearms from security forces, and unauthorised use of police and defence uniforms. The first NIA case concerned a 1 November 2023 incident in which hundreds of cadres, responding to a social media call for all "brave brothers" to assemble, gathered at the Palace Compound in Imphal East, fired upon and overpowered local police, and then advanced to Imphal West. The second case arose from the same date: the same group then attacked the 1st Manipur Rifles Battalion, ransacking government property and looting arms before escaping on the arrival of Assam Rifles and CRPF reinforcements. The Supreme Court subsequently transferred these NIA cases from Imphal to a special court in Guwahati after the investigation agency reported that the probe was being "jeopardised" in Imphal by mob interference.

Despite the gravity of these charges and the scale of documented criminality, no senior Arambai Tenggol leader had been arrested as of early 2025.

=== Documented atrocities and human rights violations ===
Amnesty International documented at least 32 incidents of gender-based violence committed by Arambai Tenggol and its sister organisation Meitei Lippun against Kuki-Zo tribal communities between May 2023 and mid-2024, including rape and sexual assault, with not a single member prosecuted during that period. The organisation's members publicly and routinely referred to tribal communities as "outsiders" and "illegal," calling for their "annihilation and killing," and no state or central authority took any measures to curb this incitement.

HRW documented the systematic blocking of victims' attempts to register complaints with the Manipur Police: in documented cases, Kuki-Zo individuals who approached police were assaulted, intimidated, or had their belongings confiscated; when victims subsequently filed FIRs, police visited their families and pressured them to withdraw the complaints. Multiple Kuki women reported rape by Meitei men during the violence; the Supreme Court of India criticised the Manipur Police for taking 14 days to register even a preliminary FIR in the viral case of two women paraded naked and sexually assaulted in public—a case that only received state attention after the video circulated internationally.

Arambai Tenggol cadres led mob attacks on Kuki-Zo villages, burning homes, businesses, and places of worship. By June 2024, journalists documented more than 200 villages destroyed, approximately 7,000 houses demolished, and 360 churches razed or desecrated across Manipur.

On 16 June 2023, the militia was blamed for the killing of a 55-year-old Naga woman through sustained gunfire at close range. Reports indicate she was first apprehended by Meira Paibi groups and then handed to Arambai Tenggol for execution.

On 28 May 2023, fighters operating under the Arambai Tenggol banner, including cadres from officially surrendered Meitei insurgent groups, engaged in a direct armed confrontation with an Assam Rifles unit at Serou in the Sugnu area.

=== Impersonation of state forces and police collusion ===
Arambai Tenggol cadres systematically wore stolen Manipur Police commando uniforms during offensive operations. During the September 2023 attack on the town of Pallel, journalists on the scene observed cadres in these stolen uniforms being granted safe passage by state policeː indicating, in the analysis of The Caravan, a deliberate operational nexus between the militia and state security forces.

In January 2024 in the border town of Moreh, militia members in police commando uniforms set fire to eight Kuki houses, two churches, and three schools. CCTV footage examined by ThePrint confirmed the testimony of residents.

=== Suppression of dissent ===
Arambai Tenggol and its affiliates carried out systematic intimidation campaigns against journalists, human rights workers, and political critics. The United Nations High Commissioner for Human Rights issued a public statement expressing alarm at threats made by the group against human rights defender Babloo Loitongbam, Director of Human Rights Alert, whose home was ransacked by approximately 15 armed militia members in October 2023 after he publicly documented the group's role in the violence. In October 2023, cadres also attacked the house of a former police officer who had publicly criticised the militia; in October 2024, the same individual's family was assaulted and detained, and police subsequently pressured the family to withdraw their complaint to the National Human Rights Commission. In September 2023, the Manipur Police filed criminal cases against journalists from the Editors Guild of India who had conducted a fact-finding inquiry into the violence, a further indicator of institutional bias in favour of perpetrators over victims.

A leaked audio recording that surfaced in July 2024, and was submitted by activists to the Ministry of Home Affairs Commission of Inquiry and the Supreme Court, purportedly captured the voice of the Chief Minister expressing intent to bomb Kuki villages and describing the shielding of Meitei attackers; a private forensic laboratory found a 93% voice match. The former Chief Minister's government denied the tape's authenticity. The Supreme Court is examining the matter.

== The Kangla Fort meeting: constitutional subversion ==
In January 2024, following a wave of retaliatory Kuki attacks that killed seven people, Arambai Tenggol summoned all elected Meitei legislators in the state, including ministers, to a meeting at the Kangla Fort on 24 January, threatening to designate any absentee as an "enemy of the Meiteis." On the day, dressed in military fatigues and openly bearing weapons, the militia's commanders rode into the Kangla Fort in jeeps as crowds lined the streets; the entry gate was conspicuously controlled by militia foot soldiers rather than the Manipur Police.

Thirty-seven members of the Manipur Legislative Assembly across multiple parties, BJP (25), Indian National Congress (5), National People's Party (4), Janata Dal–United (2), and one independent, along with two parliamentarians including a Union Minister of State for External Affairs, attended and took an oath before a shrine, then signed a six-point demand document pledging to communicate it to the central government. The Chief Minister did not attend but subsequently signed the demands. Legislators who refused to comply with the militia's programme were physically assaulted; two BJP legislators and the state president of the Indian National Congress were beaten. The NIA subsequently reported that it had transferred the Manipur proceedings to Guwahati because investigation was being "jeopardised" by mob interference—a tacit acknowledgment that the rule of law had effectively collapsed in Imphal.

The six-point demands presented to the legislators were: (1) implementation of the National Register of Citizens based on a 1951 baseline to strip citizenship from Kuki communities; (2) abrogation of the Suspension of Operations agreements with Kuki militant groups; (3) deportation of Myanmar refugees to a detention centre in Mizoram; (4) fencing of the India–Myanmar border; (5) withdrawal of the Assam Rifles from Manipur; and (6) revocation of Scheduled Tribes status for Kuki communities.

The Jamestown Foundation described the event as unprecedented in the history of India's insurgency-affected northeast, arguing that while armed groups had historically pressured elected officials, the public capitulation of an entire state legislature to a militia that had conducted mass killings, rapes, and arson represented a qualitatively new collapse of democratic governance. Writing in The Wire, commentators characterised the ceremony, conducted under duress, as "nothing short of an insurrection, a direct challenge to the state's constitutional authority to enforce law and order." The Union Home Ministry sent a negotiating team from Delhi to hold discussions with the militia, conducting meetings at Sanajaoba's residence under his private "royal flag", a spectacle that commentators described as the Indian state's "abject surrender" to a group whose members faced credible accusations of murder, rape, and arson.

== Academic assessment ==
Analysts have drawn structural parallels between Arambai Tenggol and the Salwa Judum, the state-sponsored vigilante force deployed against Naxalites in Chhattisgarh, which the Supreme Court of India later declared unconstitutional in 2011. The deliberate classification of an armed organisation as a "socio-religious group" mirrors the mechanisms by which the Salwa Judum provided state forces with plausible deniability.

Baruah, writing in Studies in Indian Politics, characterised the conflict as a collision between BJP-led "civilizational nationalism" at the national level and Meitei subnationalism at the state level, with Arambai Tenggol as the militia through which the latter was expressed and the former enabled it through political convenience. Baruah documented the militia's transformation from a "shadowy group of young armed fundamentalists from which most Meitei people seemed to want to distance themselves" to the most politically influential "civil society group" in Meitei life, a transformation made possible entirely by state-provided impunity. Frontline concluded:

"Manipur today has become a militia state, with Arambai at the centre of it all. No other non-state armed entity in Manipur today enjoys the kind of political protection, firepower, and strategic legroom that Arambai does. Imphal and New Delhi need to show political will to contain it."

Amnesty International summarised the institutional failure: "The (BJP)-led governments at both state and central level have utterly failed to end the violence in Manipur, impunity of vigilante groups, and the divisive rhetoric that has flamed the ethnic violence. Their actions have led to repression of dissenting voices and an abject humanitarian crisis in the state."
