= Leishemba Sanajaoba =

Titular king and politician in India

Member of Parliament, Rajya Sabha
- In office 19 June 2020 – 21 June 2026
- Preceded by: Bhabananda Singh
- Succeeded by: Adhikarimayum Sharda Devi
- Constituency: Manipur

Personal details
- Born: 1 March 1972 (age 54)
- Party: Bharatiya Janata Party
- Parent: Maharaja Okendrajit Singh (father)
- Relatives: Bodhchandra Singh (grandfather) also see Kingdom of Manipur
- Education: B.A. (English Hons.), Maharaja Bodhchandra College

Leishemba Sanajaoba is the current head of the former royal family of the princely state of Manipur in India, and a politician belonging to the Bharatiya Janata Party from Manipur. In 2020, he was elected as the member of Rajya Sabha from Manipur. He is often addressed with the honorific "Maharaja", which is not a statutory title. He continues to be the symbolic and spiritual head of ritualistic traditions of the erstwhile Kingdom of Manipur.
