= Imphal Valley =

Valley in Manipur, India

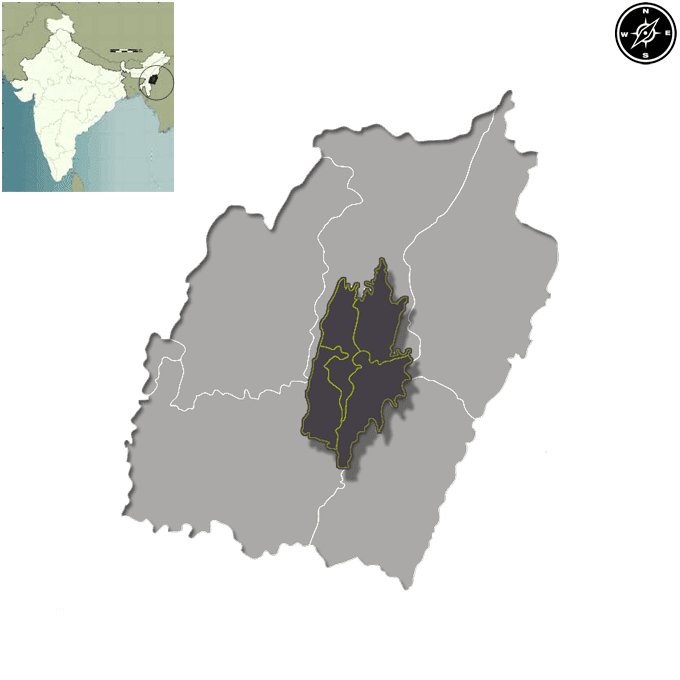
Imphal Valley of Manipur

Imphal Valley (/ˈɪmpɑːl/; Meitei: Imphal Tampak) or Manipur Valley (Meitei: Manipur Tampaak) is located in the Indian state of Manipur and is an irregular almost oval shaped canyon that was formed as a result of the multiple small rivers that originate from neighbouring hill regions surrounding the valley and flow through it. The water in the Imphal valley is fetched from several rivers that flow via the valley, such as Imphal River, Iril River, Thoubal River, Khuga River and Sekmai river.

Imphal River is the most prominent of the rivers which pass through the heart of the valley, and the river for which the entire valley is named. The Imphal valley is located in almost the centre of the state of Manipur and is surrounded by hills on all sides.

Manipur has multi-topographical characteristics; it is a part of the eastern Himalayas, especially its lower hills, and it is an important feature of the landscape of Manipur. The hills forms one of the two main physical regions of the state, the other being the Manipur valley or the Imphal valley where the state capital, Imphal city is located. The hill ranges that surround the valley include Naga hills to the north, the East Manipur hills along the eastern Myanmar border, the Kuki hills to the south, and the West Manipur Hills to the west. Many geologists have suggested that the Imphal valley is actually a lacustrine plain formed by siltation of an ancient lake. The Loktak Lake, biggest fresh water lake in the northeast region of India, located in the south west of the valley, is believed to be a remnant of the ancient lake.

The valley is about 57.92 km from north to south and 32.19 km from east to west at its broadest. The area of the valley is only 1,864.44 sq.km. This plain area extends to the foothills of the mountains. All rivers of the valley flow south due to the slope of the valley from north to south. The average elevation of the valley is 790 m above mean sea level but in the north it is 832.2 m and in the south it is 760.01 meters from mean sea level.

== Demographics ==
Manipur has a total population of around 2,855,794 as per the 2011 census. Out of this around 60% (approx) of the total population lives in the Imphal valley and the remaining 40% (approx) lives in the hill regions of Manipur. The valley region is mainly populated by the Meitei people (also known as the Manipuris).

== Climate ==
The climate is temperate in the valley but comparatively cold in the hilly regions of Manipur. In summer the average high temperature is about 32–34 °C, while in the winter temperatures can drop to as low as about 1–2 °C.
