= Churachandpur-Khoupum Protected Forest =

Protected forest in Manipur, India

Churachandpur–Khoupum Protected Forest
- Location within Manipur Location within India
- Location: Manipur, India
- Nearest city: Bishnupur, Churachandpur
- Coordinates: 24.4682°N 93.6624°E
- Area: 51.4866 km^{2} (19.8791 sq mi)
- Established: September 17, 1966
- Governing body: Government of Manipur, Forest Department

The Churachandpur–Khoupum Protected Forest was declared by the Government of Manipur in India in 1966. It is believed to be largely coincidental with the Thangjing Hills range that bounds the Imphal Valley on the southwest. The protected forest designation was relatively unknown until November 2022, when the government issued a memorandum derecognising 38 tribal villages embedded in the forest area, mainly populated by Kuki-Zo people. Amidst the uproar caused by the announcement, a small village called K. Songjang was dramatically bulldozed in February 2023, with the claim that it had encroached into the protected forest. Tensions arising from this event are stated to be one of the causes of the long drawn 2023–2024 Manipur violence.

== Context ==
Manipur is a state embedded within the Patkai-Arakan Yomas, the eastern counterpart of the Himalayas that interject between the Indian Plate and the Eurasian Plate. The state consists of a central valley portion, occupying roughly 1,820 km^{2} (700 sq mi), and the surrounding hill regions of 20,507 km^{2} (7,918 sq mi). The total forest area of the state is 17,346 km^{2}, forming 77.7% of the land area of the state.

The protected-area network, consisting of wildlife sanctuaries and national parks, covers 1,132 km^{2} (roughly 5.07% of the area of the state). In addition, the state has 36 reserve forests (1,467 km^{2}) and 22 protected forests (4,171 km^{2}). The remaining area of 11,131 km^{2} is unclassified.

== Establishment ==
The Churachandpur–Khoupum Protected Forest was notified by the Government of Manipur on 17 September 1966 under Section 29 of the Indian Forest Act, 1927. Manipur was a union territory at that time, governed by a centrally-appointed Chief Commissioner, and guided by a Legislative Assembly consisting of 30 elected members and 3 nominated members. The assembly was led by Chief Minister Mairembam Koireng Singh.

The protected forest covers 51.49 km^{2} land area, mainly comprising the Thangjing Hills range, which borders the central Imphal Valley on the southwest. Its geographical extent seems to cover the ridge and the slopes on the east and west, including the embedded valleys. It stretches from Songpi in the south to a little north of the Cachar–Bishnupur road. The highest peak on the ridge is Thangjing Hill (2109 m), which is held in reverence by the dominant Meitei community of the Imphal Valley. It is believed to be the abode of god Thangching, the presiding deity of the people of Moirang, and southwest guardian deity for all the Meitei. The devotees of the god conduct an annual pilgrimage to the top of the hill.

According to the government record, there are 38 tribal villages embedded in the forest area, with about 1,000 people each. Each village has several subvillages as per the tribal custom. After the establishment of the protected forest, a settlement officer received claims from villages, evaluated them, and issued settlement orders, defining the land area allocated to the village, which was then excluded from the protected area. (Note: An example of this for the Ukha Loikhai village was mentioned by the state legislator Paolienlal Haokip: "The MLA said that so far as the Thangjing Hills are concerned, the Chief of Ukha (Loikhai) has clear orders of the settlement officer, excluding the land belonging to Loikhai village, which includes Thangjing Hills, from the Churachandpur Khopum Protected Forest.") Within the protected area, it is said that even the cutting of firewood is restricted.

== Derecognition of villages ==
On 7 November 2022, the state government issued an "office memorandum" cancelling the recognition of all the villages embedded in the protected forest. It stated that assistant (forest) settlement officers (ASOs), who were appointed as enquiry officers in 1971, were only expected to conduct an enquiry into the "existing rights" of the communities living in the protected forest; they weren't authorised to pass settlement orders. It said that it had appointed a committee to examine the orders issued by the ASOs in June 2022, and cancelled them in December 2022, while also initiating fresh enquiries into the "nature and extent of existing rights of people prior to the notification of protected forests". All the villages were apparently issued "show cause notices" in May 2022 to submit relevant documents to support their claims of ownership.

The Kuki Students Organisation, which also acts a community advocacy group, raised serious objections to the "office memorandum" of 7 November 2022. It questioned the very formation of the protected forest, claiming that the Government of Manipur "does not have any proprietary rights" over the area, as allegedly required by the Indian Forest Act, 1927. It asked the government to reverse its policy and start proceedings to ascertain the rights of the government, rather than those the villages.

The state legislator Paolienlal Haokip (MLA from Saikot) questioned how the state government could nullify orders passed by the ASOs who, he claimed, were the statutory authority to settle claims of pre-existing rights in the absence of an FSO (forest settlement officer). There was no special need for the state government to "authorise" them as claimed in the November 2022 notification.

== Eviction of K. Songjang ==
The K. Songjang village demolished in February 2023

K. Songjang (24.6278°N 93.6948°E) is a small Kuki village of 16 families on the Cachar–Bishnupur Road (also called "Old Cachar Road"), which is said to have been a spin-out (or "bifurcation", machete) of an older village called Kungpi Naosen. The village was sent a show cause notice on 10 August 2022 and a reminder notice on 30 January 2023. According to the village chief, this was the first he heard about the Churachandpur–Khoupum Protected Forest. After he sent a response on 6 February, he heard back within four days the decision of the forest officer informing him that the village was an encroachment into protected forest and that he should vacate it. In a press note, the forest department claimed that the village was established "only in the year 2021", which was apparently concluded by examining Google Maps imagery.

On 20 February, a demolition team arrived with 6 JCB bulldozers and a large number of police and forest personnel. "They threw stones at the poultry coops, took away the chickens, destroyed the pigsty, and towed away the squealing pigs," according to a former resident. The houses and a church were razed to the ground. A request for additional time to collect their belongings was denied. The villagers, who used to live on farming vegetables and fruits, have no livelihood after the demolition of the village.

Commentators note that the villagers have deep roots in the area. The village chief said his parents arrived in the area in 1800s, lived through Japanese attacks during the World War II and the chief himself helped the government officials carry out a road survey in 1958. But the forest department said there was no record of a bifurcation of a village and even if that were the case, bifurcation was not allowed in a protected forest.

Two writ petitions were filed in the Manipur High Court to contest the government claims about K. Songjang, one by the daughter of the village chief and another by the son of the former village chief of Kungpi Naosen. The court documents show the government having argued that the settlement order of Kungpi Naosen was now "null and void", on account of the November 2022 notification.

== Ukha Loikhai ==
Thangjing Hill and environs

Ukha Loikhai is a village close to the peak of Thangjing Hill, the highest peak in the Churachandpur–Khoupum Protected Forest, which is also of historical and religious significance to the Meiteis. The vicinity of the hill is however populated by the Kuki-Zo people. Ukha, locally known as Loikhai, is a compact village on the western slope of the hill. According to legislator Paolienlal Haokip, the lands around the top of the hill were included the village lands of Ukha Loikhai by the settlement order which is now declared contentious.

Disputes around the Ukha Loikhai village arose in May 2022 when the Meitei activists belonging to Bharatiya Janata Yuva Morcha (the youth wing of the ruling Bharatiya Janata Party) went to carry out tree plantation in the deforested areas of the Thangjing Hill. The villagers opposed their efforts, and subsequently the Kuki Students Organisation of the Henglep block issued a statement saying that they were village lands under the control of the Ukha village chief.

Meitei activists in Moirang, organised under the Committee on Protection and Preservation of Historical Rights of Koubru and Thangjing Hill Range (CPPKT), questioned these claims and their own rights as supposedly "indigenous" people. While the immediate dispute was resolved by the Director General of Police, CPPKT asked the government to clarify the issue of ownership. The government's appointment of a committee to study the settlement orders followed these developments.

Following further disputes during the 2023–2024 Manipur violence, the Government of Manipur issued a statement calling the Kuki bodies' claim on ownership of the Thangjing Hill "fabricated and concocted", citing its erstwhile cancellation of settlement orders in the protected forest. However, it also said that a fresh inquiry has been initiated. According to The Hindu, the National Commission for Scheduled Tribes has also initiated an inquiry.
