= Kangvai =

Village in Manipur, India

- Interactive map of Kangvai
- Location in Manipur, India Kangvai (India)
- Coordinates: 24.4411°N 93.7123°E
- Country: India
- State: Manipur
- District: Churachandpur

Population (2011)
  - Total: 1,084

Language(s)
  - Official: Meitei (Manipuri)
- Time zone: UTC+5:30 (IST)

Kangvai (Note: Alternative spellings: "Kangwai" and "Kangbai".) is a village in the Churachandpur district of Manipur, India, near its contested border with Bishnupur district. It is on the bank of the Kangvai stream that flows down from the eastern slopes of the Thangjing Hill into the Imphal Valley, stretching from the foothills to the Tedim Road. Kangvai is also the headquarters of the Kangvai Subdivision in the Churachandpur district. In the 2011 census, it had a population of 939, most of them Kuki-Zo people. Next to Kangvai along Tedim Road is a Meitei village called Phougakchao Ikhai, which is considered part of Bishnupur district.

According to many sources, the 2023–2025 Manipur violence began at Kangvai, causing most residents to abandon the lower portion of the village near Tedim Road known as "Kangvai Bazar". Phougakchai Ikhai was also evacuated in the initial days of the conflict, by the residents started returning in October 2023.

== Geography ==
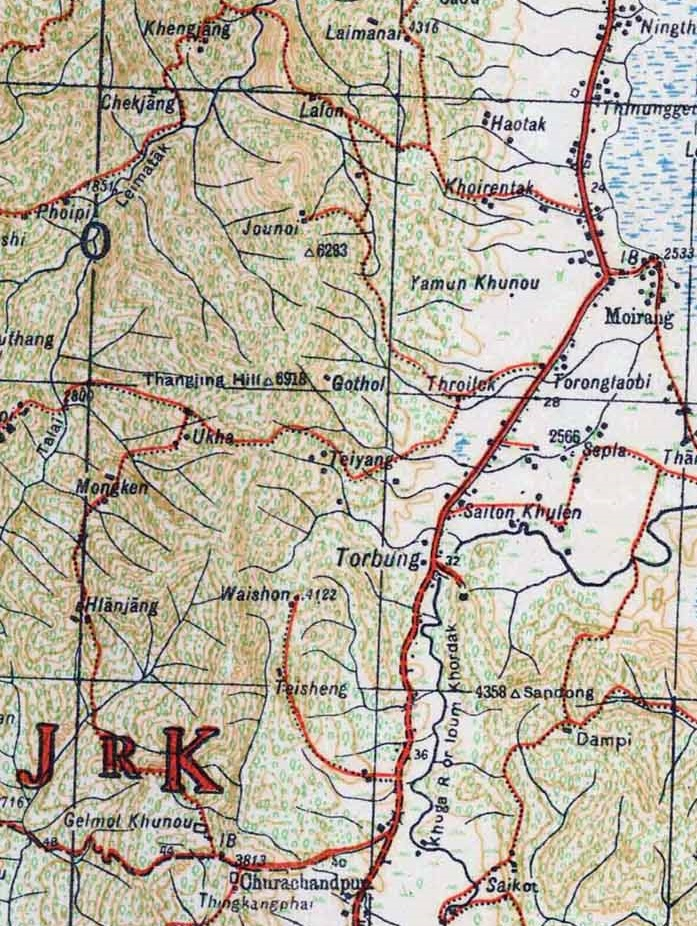
1944 Survey of India map of the region: the Kangvai settlements are shown to the east of Thangjing Hill, but not labelled

Kangvai is at the eastern foothills of Thangjing Hill at the southwestern corner of the Imphal Valley. The village belongs to the Churachandpur district, which extends to the west as well as south of Kangvai. The village stretches east-west from the foothills to the Tedim Road (now part of NH-2). The area near Tedim Road is referred to as "Kangvai Bazar". The central portion of the village is called "Khawpi", which is the main settlement area, and the western portion at the foothills is called "Uzuak". Adjacent to the Uzuak area of Kangvai, to its south, is a smaller village called K. Kotlian (or K. Kawtlian), whose access to the outside world is through Kangvai.

Kangvai Bazar is about 1 km north of Torbung. Torbung is considered to be partly in the Bishnupur district, even though it is to the south of Kangvai. This results in a complex boundary between two districts, which is difficult to depict on maps. (Note: For example, the map of Kangvai Subdivision by the Manipur Remote Sensing Applications Centre puts Kangvai itself outside the subdivision, but rather in the Moirang Subdivision of the Bishnupur district.) Adjacent to Kangvai, to its northeast, is a Meitei village called Phougakchao Ikhai, which is considered to be part of Torbung.

Kangvai as well as Phougakchao Ikhai are on the bank of the Kangvai stream, which flows down from the Thangjing Hill and nominally drains into the Loktak Lake, but most of the water is used up for cultivation.

== Demographics ==
Kangvai is populated by a majority of Kuki-Zo tribal population (91 percent according to the 2011 census), predominantly Vaiphei people. The overall population is 939 living in 171 households. The K. Kotlian village has a population of 145 people living in 26 households.

Phougakchao Ikhai, which is not a census village, is believed to have 2,000 residents living in 300 households. They live in several subvillages named Phougakchao Ikhai Mamang Leikai, Maning Leikai, Mayai Leikai, Awang Leikai, Makha Leikai and Phougakchao Ikhai Bazar. The entire Phougakchao Ikhai village is under the Torbung gram panchayat. In 2012, there were three panchayat wards in Phougakchao Ikhai, named Awang, Mayai Maning and Ikhai Maning.

== History ==
Kangvai is first seen mentioned during the Kuki Rebellion of 1917–1919 (also called Anglo-Kuki War). During the Kuki war preparations in December 1917, the chief of Ukha (on the western slopes of the Thangjing Hill) sent 12 Kukis to collect his mithuns from Kangvai. These Kukis were fired upon by British troops, an action that enraged the Kangvai Kukis, leading them to join the Ukha Kukis in their rebellion. On 19 December, the combined Kukis of Ukha and Kangvai raided the Manipur State forest toll station at Ithai, presumably for arms and for neutralising the state forces. On 25 December, the British Political Agent J. C. Higgins went with a force to the foothills of Thangjing Hill to punish the Ukha Kukis. The force was beaten back by sniper attacks and home-made leather cannons (pumpi). Subsequently, the British gathered larger forces to attack Ukha and burnt down that village.

According to Kuki sources, in 1941–1942, the Manipur State Darbar delineated the borders of the area known as "Haokip Reserved" (the northern part of the present-day Churachandpur district), originally established in 1907 by the British governor, W. A. Cosgrave. The northern border of Haokip Reserve passed through Kangvai.

Christianity had an early start at Kangvai, with the Welsh missionary Watkin Roberts having established a Bible School there. When Roberts decided to shift the school to Sielmat, near Lamka, as well as to establish his headquarters there, the Vaipheis of Kangvai were peeved and disowned him. Nevertheless, the early adoption of Christianity helped the Vaipheis to get ahead in education. In 1968, Kaikhogin Vaiphei from Kangvai became the first Kuki to enter the Indian Foreign Service. The Vaiphei Students Association, called Zillai, is based in Kangvai, and celebrated its 75th anniversary (Platinum Jubilee) in 2014.

During World War II, the Tedim Road was laid by the British administration as part of its defence against Japanese invasion. The road-widening project in the Torbung area (between Oksonbung and Leisang) was contracted to a Kangvai man named Thawngzagin. The labourers were paid one and a half rupee as daily wages, which appears to have been exploitative. When the British withdrew from Tedim to Imphal, seven decisive battles were fought along Tedim Road. All the villages within seven kilometre distance of the road were asked to be evacuated within two days. The villagers of Kangvai mostly went to southwest Manipur to stay with relatives or acquaintances. They originally planned to stay at Ukha Loikhai, on the western side of Thangjing Hill, but that village did not have enough food supplies to support them. Modern commentators notice that no refugee camps were set up anywhere in the vicinity, which must have caused considerable hardship.

Being on the border between the valley district of Bishnupur and hill district of Churachandpur, Kangvai is often a site of dispute and contestation. Bandhs (shutdowns) and blockades are conducted here as well as at Torbung as a way of asserting the rights and privileges of the valley and hill communities.

=== Phougakchao Ikhai ===
Compared to Kangvai, the Meitei village Phougakchao Ikhai considerably modern.

In 1955, a grass mahal (a grassland under the ownership of the state) named "Phougakchao" was listed under the Imphal West tehsil, whose grass was auctioned annually. Later it became a village, but it is far away from the present-day Phougakchao Ikhai.

The earliest mention of Phougakchao Ikhai is found in 1964. Records are scant because it was never listed as a census village. It is rather counted as part of Torbung, whose gram panchayat (village council) covers the village. In October 2023, it was reported that 2,000 residents normally lived in Phougakchao Ikhai, of whom 1,700 were displaced during the 2023 Manipur violence.

=== Kangvai Subdivision ===
During 2014–2015, the Government of Manipur created a Kangvai Subdivision in the Churachandpur district. The new subdivision includes 66 villages, which were previously under the Churachandpur Subdivision and the Henglep Subdivision. Initially, the Government planned to call the subdivision after the Thangjing Hill, using the Kuki spelling "Thangting" for it. The move was seen by the Meiteis as an attempt to rename their sacred hill, and led to protests. Eventually the government chose the more neutral name after the village of Kangvai.

== 2023–2026 Manipur conflict ==
The 2023–2026 Manipur violence between the Meiteis and Kuki-Zo people is believed to have started at the Kangvai village on 3 May 2023. On that day, between 11 am and 1 pm, Kukis held a protest march in the Churachandpur town against the Meitei demand for a Scheduled Tribe status. Kuki-Zo people from all parts of the district, including Kangvai, attended the march. The call for the march also generated a "counter response" by the Meiteis according to the Union Home Ministry. Reports were received of a counter-blockade at Torbung, and a counter-agitation in the surrounding valley areas (such as the Kangvai village), where houses were attacked by Meitei mobs. The residents were seen fleeing their homes and gathering in the fields. Two dead bodies were found by the police in Kangvai sometime between 1:30 pm and 2:15 pm, indicating the first victims in the violence. According to Kukis, the police and commandos either stood aloof or sided with the attackers. The attackers moved back only after Kukis from neighbouring villages and towns came to confront them. But they came back around 8 pm after the police had left and burnt down more houses. A reporter visiting the Kangvai Bazar three months later, described the scene thus:

Homes and shops have been flattened and torched; charred remains of vehicles are everywhere. It is like crossing the site of a natural disaster. The bazaar is entirely empty, except for the vast number of troops who now occupy this ghost town.

The residents of Kangvai that fled on 3 May never returned to their homes. The Kangvai Bazar area was taken control of by the Meiteis, who used it as a checkpoint. All vehicles coming from the Churachandpur side were stopped here, making Kangvai a transit point where human couriers sent by the officials from the two sides exchanged deliveries. In June, the central armed forces defined a "buffer zone" between Churachandpur and Bishnupur districts, which included the Kangvai village.

Meitei groups said that the village of Phougakchai Ikhai was also attacked by the Kuki mobs. The Sangai Express reported that the mobs attempted to burn the forest office at the village and that the police dispersed them by firing tear gas shells and blank fire. Nevertheless it is said that the mobs set fire to at least six houses and some vehicles. The Sangai Express did not mention that Arambai Tenggol was present in the village, which was later admitted by its chief Korounganba Khuman. In December 2023, a phone call made by the former police officer Thounoujam Brinda was leaked, where she is heard stating that Arambai Tenggol were responsible for the arson of "Meitei houses" at Torbung gram panchayat (which includes Phougakchao Ikhai) on that day. The Torbung United Club secretary disagreed with Brinda's claim and demanded a public clarification. The women's vigilante group called Meira Paibi ransacked Brinda's house demanding clarification.

According to later reports, the villagers of Phougakchao Ikhai also fled their homes on 3 May. Out of 2000 residents, 1700 people were said to have been displaced, with only 300 remaining. Phougakchao Ikhai was later included in the "buffer zone", and the security forces erected barricades. In August, the Meitei civil society organisation COCOMI demanded the removal of barricades by the end of the month, and then organised mobs to storm the barricades. This resulted in clashes with the security forces and several people got injured in the stampedes. Eventually the residents were allowed to return in early October 2023 and some 550 people did so.

== Bibliography ==
- "Tribal Solidarity March takes ugly turn; houses, offices, vehicles burnt". The Sangai Express. 4 May 2023.
- Churachandpur District Census Handbook (PDF), Directorate of Census Operations, Manipur, 2011
- Guite, Jangkhomang (2019), "'Fighting the White Men till the Last Bullet': The general course of the Anglo-Kuki War", in Jangkhomang Guite; Thongkholal Haokip (eds.), The Anglo-Kuki War, 1917–1919: A Frontier Uprising against Imperialism during World War I, Routledge, pp. 37–, ISBN 978-1-138-50704-3
- Soilalsiam (2009), Changing Vaiphei Society: A Geographical Study, Shillong: North-Eastern Hill University
- Vaiphei, S. Lalthamuan (2022), Second World War and Southern Manipur (PDF), Aizwal: Mizoram University
