= Thangjing Hill =

Mountain in Manipur, India

- Location within Manipur Location within India

Highest point
- Elevation: 6,918 ft (2,109 m)
- Coordinates: 24.4682°N 93.6624°E

Geography
- Location: Churachandpur district, Manipur
- Country: India

Thangjing Hill (also called Thangching Hill and Thangting Hill) (Note: Older spellings: "Tangching" and "Thungching".) is a mountain peak in the Indian state of Manipur. It is in the Churachandpur district, to the west of Moirang. The north–south-running mountain range on which it sits is also called Thangjing range or Thangjing Hills. The range forms part of the western border of the Imphal Valley.

The Thangjing Hill is believed by the Meitei people (the dominant valley-based community of Manipur) to be the abode of Thangching, regarded as the ancestral deity of Moirang. In the Meitei cosmology, the "body" of Manipur is represented with various natural features of the land, including the Thangjing hill as its right leg.

The Meiteis of the Moirang region carry out an annual pilgrimage to the top of the hill. Some Kuki commentators have said that this is a recent practice.

== Geography ==
The Thangjing Hill is at an elevation of about 2,100 metres (6,900 ft) above the mean sea level. It is part of the western hill range that bounds the Imphal Valley. The entire hill is in the Churachandpur district, which is a hill district dominated by the Kuki-Zo people. The peak of the hill and the western slopes are in the Henglep Subdivision (or "Henglep block"), while some part of the eastern slopes are in the Kangvai subdivision.

Streams rising in the western slopes of the hill flow into the Leimatak River, which flows north to join the Irang River. To the south rises the Tuila River, which joins the Tuivai River, a major river of the Churachandpur district. (Tuila was once considered the "Manipur source" of the Tuivai River, but now the main source is taken to lie in the Chin State of Myanmar, and Tuila regarded as its tributary.) To the east of the Thangjing Hill rise the Loklai, Torbung and Kangvai streams, which water the villages named after them. To the southeast of the range rises the Lanva River, which flows south till Songpi, whose ridge deflects the stream to the east, eventually draining into the Khuga River near the Churachandpur town.

== Mythology ==
In Meitei mythology, the hill is mainly associated with the deity Eputhou Thangjing who is considered the guardian of the mountain and the protector of the south of the Kanglei world. The hill is also mentioned in the love story of Khamba Thoibi.

In the mythology of the Koireng people, Thangjing Hill was a sacred worship site where they revered the deity "Ibudhou Thangching Koirel Lai", known commonly as "Koren Lai" (literally, god of the Koireng). He was incorporated into the Meitei pantheon.

== History ==
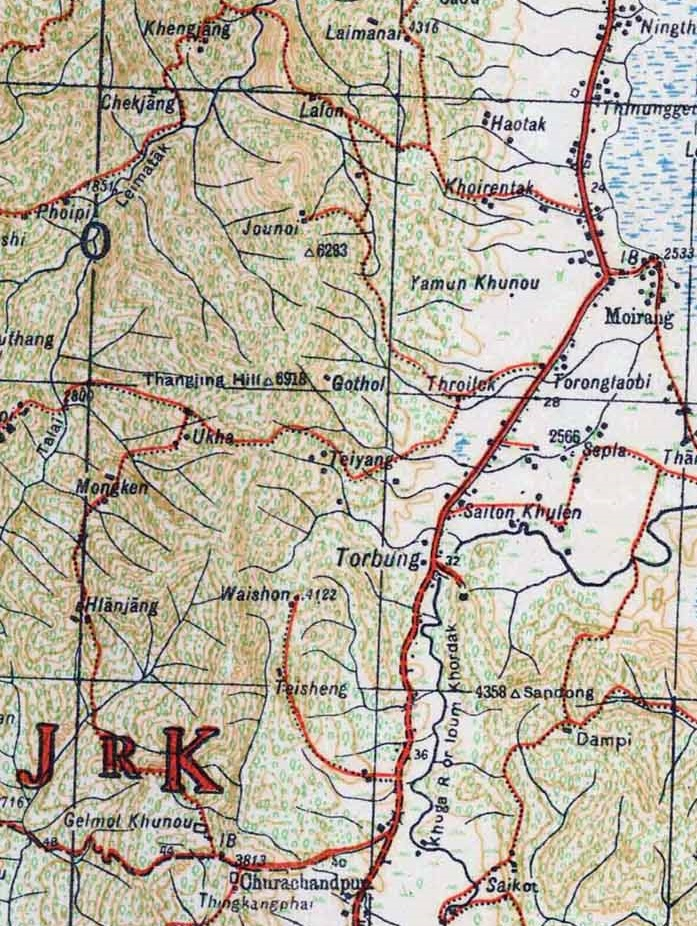
1944 Survey of India map of Thangjing Hill and environs

=== Traditions ===
According to the Moirang kings' chronicle Ningthourol Lampuba, the Koireng people, an "Old Kuki" tribe, used to be settled around the Thangjing Hill. The Moirangs under king Thingre Nachaoba raided them and defeated them. Historians believe that the Koirengs migrated away from the region due to the repeated incursions by the Moirang people. The Thangjing Hill was also deified by the Koireng people and the deity has since been adopted by the Moirangs, and eventually by the Meitei people in general. The Chiru people, another Old Kuki tribe, have historical memory of having lived on the Thangjing Hill. The villagers later migrated to a new location in the present day Kangpokpi district for better availability of agricultural land and named the new village "Thangjing Chiru".

One of the Kabui Naga tribes, named Sungbu, also have a tradition of having originated from the Thangjing Hill. The Moirang people have a tradition of having been saved from a man-eater by the Kabui chief from Thangjing Hill during the rule of Thangtek Soinaiba.

=== British Raj period ===
By the time British Raj arrived in Manipur (c. 1830), the Sungbus had moved to the region around the Cachar–Bishnupur Road on sites that were previously occupied by Kuki people (called "Khongjais" by Manipuris).

According to British commissioner Pemberton, Kukis were in occupation of all the southern hills from Tipaimukh to Thangjing Hills.

William McCulloch, British resident between 1844 and 1867, found that Kukis were living all around the Manipur valley, which was confirmed by later commentators.

These descriptions suggest that the Thangjing Hill itself was under the occupation of the Kukis.

A village called Ukha (also called "Loikhai" or "Luaikhai") on the western slopes of the Thangjing Hill is mentioned in the Gazetteer of Manipur (1886). It is described as being at an elevation of 3,500 ft (1,100 m), with a population of 150 people belonging to the "Changput subdivision of the Kongjai Kuki tribe". Its current population per 2011 census is 418, and the elevation on modern maps is 1,500 metres.

After the Lushai Expedition of 1871–1872, Manipur received additional Kuki-Zo refugees from the Lushai Hills region, who were settled in the Thangjing Hills range and in the valley southwest of Moirang. Land and protection were provided by Raja Chandrakirti Singh, as well as food for subsistence till they could grow their own crops. The Gazetteer of Manipur lists over 20 Kuki villages in the valley of the Tuila River, which flows south from the Thangjing Hills range.

After the British took over Manipur as a princely state in 1891, they decided to administer the hill regions directly, outside the control of the Manipur State Darbar. Thangjing Hill came under the Southwest Subdivision, initially administered from Moirang.

During the Kuki Rebellion of 1917–1919, the Thangjing Hills and the Ukha village played key roles. In early 1917, the local chiefs met at Ukha and Henglep to discuss the emerging conflict with the British authorities. After Mombi was burned by the British, an all-Kuki War Council was called by the chief of Chassad, and the chiefs received a signal to resist and fight. War preparations were begun in October after another gathering of chiefs. The British attack came in December, led by the Political Agent J. C. Higgins. The Ukha Kukis staged an able defence of the Thangjing Hill, with sniper attacks and home-made leather cannons, causing several casualties on the British troops, but no Kuki was captured. Ukha was reportedly burnt down, and the Kukis escaped into the forests. The failure of the operation and a similar one at Mombi stunned the British officers. Another attack with a larger force was launched in February 1918, with similar results. Eventually the rebellion was suppressed only by wholesale destruction of villages, including their livestock and foodgrains, driving the people into the woods to starve, along with women and children.

After the Rebellion, the British reorganised their hill administration by establishing a new headquarters for the South-West Subdivision at Songpi (then called "Churachandpur"). The Churachandpur Subdivision eventually became the Churachandpur district in independent India in 1971.

=== Post-independence history ===
In 1966, the Government of Manipur included the entire Thangjing Hills range in Churachandpur-Khoupum Protected Forest under Section 29 of the Indian Forest Act, 1927. As per the law, the pre-existing settlements in the designated area are meant to be excluded from the protected forest. An (Assistant) Settlement Officer reportedly issued a settlement order for the Ukha-Loikhai village, excluding it from the protected forest areas.

Indian Airlines Flight 257 on 16 August 1991 crashed into Thangjing Hills range, killing all 69 people on board.

Occasional disputes have arisen over the Thangjing Hill, with the Kuki-Zos claiming to be the inhabitants of the region and the Meiteis claiming it to be their holy site. In 2010, a clash occurred between Meitei pilgrims on their annual pilgrimage and the local residents, with two Kuki youth being killed and four injured.

During 2014–2015, the Government of Manipur created a Thangting Subdivision in the Churachandpur district, using the Kuki spelling "Thangting" for the Thangjing Hill. The new subdivision was to include 66 villages, which were previously under the Churachandpur subdivision and the Henglep subdivision. The move was seen by the Meiteis as an attempt to rename their sacred hill, and led to protests and shutdowns. Eventually, the government renamed the subdivision as the Kangvai subdivision.

=== Current disputes ===
In May 2022, Meitei activists under the banner of Bharatiya Janata Yuva Morcha (BJYM, the youth wing of the ruling party) organised a tree plantation drive in Thangjing hills, which was opposed by the local villagers. The Kuki Students Organisation (KSO) of the Henglep block raised the issue and barred the entry of "outsiders" into the hills without the permission of the village chief of the area. The chief of the Ukha Loikhai village was mentioned as the "rightful owner" of the Thangjing Hill, whose permission was necessary for any such efforts.

The Meitei community got organised under the banner of Committee on Protection and Preservation of Historical Rights of Koubru and Thangjing Hill Range (CPPKT) and announced counter-restrictions on the hill people from entering the valley areas. A confrontation was averted by the involvement of the Director General of Police, P. Doungel, who arranged a negotiated settlement. The dispute also brought into focus the issue of ownership of the Thangjing Hill, and CPPKT asked the government for clarification.

Soon afterwards, the Government of Manipur said it formed a committee to look into the settlement orders and, in November 2022, cancelled all the orders issued for the Churachandpur-Khoupum Protected Forest on the ground that they were issued by Assistant Settlement Officers rather than a full-ranked Forest Settlement Officer. The Manipur cabinet also proposed to include four hectares on the Thangjing Hill under Manipur Ancient and Historical Monuments Act in order to protect it from encroachments.

Thangjing Hill came to be contested again during the 2023–2024 Manipur violence. Within a few weeks of the onset of violence in May, the Meiteis and Kukis were separated into their own areas. In September, the Kuki community installed a Christian cross on top of the Thangjing Hill, which the Meitei community regarded as desecration of their holy site. It appears that the cross was later removed, presumably by Meitei activists. It was re-erected again in December–January, leading to loud protests from the Meitei community again. The Kukis have denied that the hill is exclusively a sacred site of the Meiteis. Responding to a claim by a Kuki-Zo body that the hill was included in village lands, the Government of Manipur issued a statement calling the claim "fabricated and concocted", citing its erstwhile cancellation of settlement orders in Churachandpur-Khoupum Protected Forest. However, it also said that a fresh inquiry has been initiated. According to The Hindu, the National Commission for Scheduled Tribes has also initiated an inquiry.

== See also ==
- Mount Koubru
- Baruni Hill

== Bibliography ==
- Churachandpur District Census Handbook (PDF), Directorate of Census Operations, Manipur, 2011
- Brown, R. (1874), Statistical Account of the Native State of Manipur and the Hill Territory under Its Rule, Calcutta: Office of the Superintendent of Government Printing
- Dun, E. W. (1992) [1886], Gazetteer of Manipur, Manas Publications – via archive.org
- Jangkhomang Guite; Thongkholal Haokip, eds. (2019), The Anglo-Kuki War, 1917–1919: A Frontier Uprising against Imperialism during World War I, Routledge, ISBN 978-1-138-50704-3
  - Guite, Jangkhomang (2019), "'Fighting the White Men till the Last Bullet': The general course of the Anglo-Kuki War", Ibid, Taylor & Francis, pp. 37–, ISBN 978-0-429-77494-2
  - Haokip, D. Letkhojam (2019), "'These Crafty Jungle Fighters': Tactics, technology and symbols of Kuki war", Ibid, Taylor & Francis, pp. 118–, ISBN 978-0-429-77494-2
  - Haokip, Thongkholal (2019), "Breaking the Spirit of the Kukis: Launching the 'largest series of military operations' in the northeastern frontier of India", Ibid, Taylor & Francis, pp. 93–, ISBN 978-0-429-77494-2
- McCulloch, W. (1859). Account of the Valley of Munnipore and of the Hill Tribes. Selections from the Records of the Government of India (Foreign Department). Calcutta: Bengal Printing Company. OCLC 249105916 – via archive.org.
- Parratt, Saroj Nalini Arambam (2005). The Court Chronicle of the Kings of Manipur: The Cheitharon Kumpapa, Volume 1. London: Routledge. ISBN 9780415344302.
- Parratt, Saroj Nalini Arambam (2009). The Court Chronicle of the Kings of Manipur: The Cheitharon Kumpapa, Volume 2. Foundation Books / Cambridge University Press India. ISBN 978-81-7596-854-7.
- Pau, Pum Khan (2019), Indo-Burma Frontier and the Making of the Chin Hills: Empire and Resistance, Taylor & Francis, ISBN 9781000507454
