= New Zoveng =

Coordinates: 24.351°N 93.707°E

New Zoveng is a village in the Churachandpur district of Manipur, India. Geographically, it is an extension of the Zoveng and Hiangzou wards. Its inhabitants are mainly from the Zou community. Mr.Khup Mangte is the present chief of New Zoveng.
