= Kamdou Veng =

Coordinates: 24.357°N 93.706°E

Kamdou Veng is a town ward within the Churachandpur Town (also called Lamka) in the Indian state of Manipur. Kamdou Veng is sometimes referred to as Phiamphu Veng. The locality has a high concentration of ethnic Zou and Thado communities. Kamdo veng is located close to other Zou settlement sites like Hiangzou, New Zoveng and Zoumunnuam. There are more than 500 households and is one of the most populous villages among the Zou people. It was established in 1993 under the chairmanship of Shri Kamzadou Phiamphu.
