= Henglep =

- Interactive map of Henglep
- Location in Manipur, India Henglep (India)
- Coordinates: 24.484°N 93.52°E
- Country: India
- State: Manipur
- District: Churachandpur
- Subdivision: Churachandpur North
- Elevation: 1,100 m (3,600 ft)

Population (2011)
  - Total: 992

Language(s)
  - Official: Meitei (Manipuri)
  - Regional: Kuki-Chin languages
- Time zone: UTC+5:30 (IST)

Henglep (Note: Alternative spelling: Hinglep.) is a village in the Churachandpur district in the Manipur state of India, populated by about a thousand Kuki-Zo people. Henglep is also the headquarters of the Churachandpur North subdivision (or Henglep Subdivision) with a population of more than 30,000 people. Henglep was a key area of operations during the Kuki Rebellion of 1917–1919 (also called the Anglo-Kuki War).

== Geography ==
Henglep is situated on a mountain ridge to the west of the Leimatak River at an elevation of 1,100 metres (3,600 ft). The river is actually a headstream of the Leimatak River called "Tuibin", which originates in the Mamunlhang hill ranges and flows north. It combines with a south-flowing headstream called "Thingbong" a short distance to the north of Henglep, to form the Leimatak River.

The Tuibin river valley below Henglep is referred to as the "Kuchu valley" (roughly at 24°26′57″N 93°32′36″E) in the Manipur royal chronicle Cheitharol Kumbaba. The Manipur ruler Ching-Thang Khomba (Bhagyachandra or Jai Singh) had a temporary royal residence built here while waging war on the Khongjai hills to the west of Henglep. A key village called "Khongchai" was subdued and all its inhabitants, who were Kukis, became subjects of the Manipur kingdom, acquiring the name "Khongchais" (or "Khongjais") in the process. According to scholar Saroj Nalini Parratt, the king's court in the Kangla Fort was also named "Kuchu", possibly as a remembrance of this victory.

== History ==
After the British took over Manipur as a princely state in 1891, they decided to administer the hill regions directly, outside the control of the Manipur State Darbar. Thangjing Hill came under the Southwest Subdivision, initially administered from Moirang. Henglep was part of the subdivision.

During the Kuki Rebellion of 1917–1919 (also called the "Anglo-Kuki War"), the Henglep area was a key war theatre ("area of operations" in British terminology). Another village called Ukha to the east of Henglep, closer to the Thangjing Hills range, was also part of the area. Pakang Haokip in Henglep, along with Semchung Haokip at Ukha, Haoneh Haokip at Nabil and Paosum Haokip at Songhphu, led the war effort. In early 1917, the local chiefs met at Ukha and Henglep to discuss the emerging conflict with the British authorities. After Mombi was burned by the British, an all-Kuki War Council was called by the chief of Chassad, and the chiefs received a signal to resist and fight. War preparations were begun in October after another gathering of chiefs at Ukha. The British attack came in December, led by the Political Agent J. C. Higgins. The Ukha Kukis were supported by Henglep and other villages, and staged an able defence, with sniper attacks and home-made leather cannons, causing several casualties on the British troops, but no Kuki was captured. Ukha was reportedly burnt down, and the Kukis escaped into the hills. Another attack with a larger force was launched in February 1918, with similar results.

Eventually the rebellion was suppressed only by wholesale destruction of villages, including their livestock and foodgrains, driving the people into the woods to starve, along with women and children.

After the Rebellion, the British reorganised their hill administration by establishing a new headquarters for the South-West Subdivision at Songpi (then called "Churachandpur"). The Churachandpur Subdivision eventually became the Churachandpur district in independent India in 1971.

== Transportation ==
The Henglep Road connects Henglep to the National Highway 2 (NH2) near the village of Thingkeu, 43 kilometres (27 mi) to the south. NH2 connects to the district headquarters at Churachandpur as well as the western periphery of Manipur at Tipaimukh. The Henglep Road continues on to the north till Kolchung.

Henglep also has a road to Ukha Loikhai in the east, which continues on to Thangjing Hill and Torbung.

== Henglep Subdivision ==
The Henglep Subdivision, officially the "Churachandpur North" subdivision, consists of a single tribal development block, which is also referred to as the Henglep block. It has 122 villages under its jurisdiction, with a combined population of 30,616 people in the 2011 census. It has a sex ratio of 942 females to 1000 males. About 95 percent of the population belong to Scheduled Tribes.

== See also ==
- List of populated places in Churachandpur district

== Bibliography ==
- Churachandpur District Census Handbook (PDF), Directorate of Census Operations, Manipur, 2011
- Jangkhomang Guite; Thongkholal Haokip, eds. (2019), The Anglo-Kuki War, 1917–1919: A Frontier Uprising against Imperialism during World War I, Routledge, ISBN 978-1-138-50704-3
  - Guite, Jangkhomang (2019), "'Fighting the White Men till the Last Bullet': The general course of the Anglo-Kuki War", Ibid, pp. 37–
  - Haokip, D. Letkhojam (2019), "'These Crafty Jungle Fighters': Tactics, technology and symbols of Kuki war", Ibid, pp. 118–
  - Haokip, Thongkholal (2019), "Breaking the Spirit of the Kukis: Launching the 'largest series of military operations' in the northeastern frontier of India", Ibid, pp. 93–
- Parratt, Saroj Nalini Arambam (2005). The Court Chronicle of the Kings of Manipur: The Cheitharon Kumpapa, Volume 1. London: Routledge. ISBN 9780415344302.
- Parratt, Saroj Nalini Arambam (2009). The Court Chronicle of the Kings of Manipur: The Cheitharon Kumpapa, Volume 2. Foundation Books / Cambridge University Press India. ISBN 978-81-7596-854-7.
