= Hiangtam =

Hiangtam Hengtam
- Interactive map of Hiangtam
- Location in Manipur, India Hiangtam (India)
- Coordinates: 24.0589°N 93.6192°E
- Country: India
- State: Manipur
- District: Lamka District
- Elevation: 1,350 m (4,430 ft)

Population (2011)
  - Total: 632 (167 in Hiangtam-K and 465 in Hiangtam-V)

Language(s)
  - Official: Paite (Zomi)
- Time zone: UTC+5:30 (IST)

Hiangtam or Hengtam is a village in the Churachandpur district of Manipur, India. It is located in the southern part of the district in the Singngat Subdivision. It was the site of fierce resistance during the Kuki Rebellion of 1917–1919 (or Anglo-Kuki War) fought by the Zou people.

== Historical significance ==
Hiangtam is a large, but historic village on the Indo-Myanmar border. It is one of the oldest settlements of the Zou community in Manipur, India. Hiangtam is best known for its association with the Kuki Rising (locally called "Zogal") during World War I. The Manlun chief Goulun of this Zou village rebelled against British colonial rule in 1917–19. The immediate cause of the uprising was forced recruitment of the natives for the Labour Corps in France. Goulun was one of the bravest Zou leader and the greatest of his time. In The Battle of Hiangtam(Hengtam), a few miles away from Singngat (Singhat), was the main headquarters of the Zou fighter during the Zou Gal (1917–1919). The war and its strategic policies seemed to be hatched from this village. Goulun was the chief of Hiangtam.

There is a unique local tale about the battle of Hiangtam (Hengtam) among the Zou people. It is said that the British troops conveyed a message to the Zou fighters to surrender or else they would drop bombs on the village. To this, Goulun responded, "Vanleng a na'ng len uleh ahgochieng a ka'ng satkhiet ding uh" (If you would attack us with plane we would strike down with a long stick). Local songs were even composed on this plan and long stick story. According to local sources, a number of Siallum thau (leather cannons) were used in this battle by Zou fighters. The official recorded that after burning Singngat (Singhat), Cosgrave and his column continued to March to Hiangtam (Hengtam) on 19 March 1918. On their way they burned down 100 maunds of paddy from the village Jhum Lands. As they climbed up Hiangtam village, the Zous began firing from elongated stockades behind which stood a large fort (popularly known as Hiangtam fort). Cosgrave estimated that the Zous had at least 20 guns behind the elongated stockades. In this incident, one of the Cosgrave's army sepoys, Harka Bahadur Chettri, was shot in the head and died.

The Zous kept extremely strong defences and were not in a position to dislodge from the big stockade (the main fort) until the British military forces fired several shells of cannon (mortar) at it from close range and overran it with a rain of bullets from their magazine rifles. Cosgrave wrote: 'As they ultimately entered the main stockade, they found evidence of a man killed by a hit as the man's brain was found lying over the ground. He also assumed that from numerous marks of blood that was spilled around some other defenders of the stockade were believed to be either killed or wounded too".

Cosgrave mention that apart from a sepoy Chettri, his men suffered not many casualties despite being engaged in a close-range fight with the Zou defenders. A bullet struck a jamadar of Naga Hills Battalion in the arm while some shot hits captain Ostrehan's boot.

Cosgrave had to admit that the battle of Hiangtam was one of the toughest fights he had ever seen in his Manipur expedition. To quote him:

"The defence of Hengtam village was by far the most stubborn and well organised fight I have seen the Manipur Kukis put up, and there is every sign that our present foes Manlun Manchong Kukis (Zous) are a more formidable foe than the other Kuki with whom No.2 Column has so far dealt".

The British troops fired 1,300 rounds of .303 and Martini Henry ammunition during the exchange of fire with the Zous at Hiangtam. Captain Ostrehan regretted that the troops should have been equipped with Maxim guns. The British wanted to punish Hiangtam as much as possible. However, to their disappointment, they could find nothing much except for five goats. There were no jhums, metnas or paddy left to destroy.

Goulun was arrested and jail and release shortly. According to the locals, after the Zou-Gal, the British offer him land from Hiangtam - Singngat-Mata. He denied the offers because of mosquitos; hilly regions were more valuable during that time.

Unlike the valley of Manipur, Hill areas administration was based mostly in Chieftainship. After 1917–1919, Political Agents were appointed for the administration of the hill areas. After the death of Goulun, Thangkhochin (his younger brother son) was called from Burma (now Myanmar) to be Chief-in-Charge (Caretaker) of the village. The boundary of Hiangtam became smaller during Thangkhochin. Some machette/hamlet villages of Hiangtam are Likhai, Hiangtam (K), Sialnah, Henjang,Tangpizawl,Hiangtam(v). Thangkhanlal, son of Thangkhochin was an MLA-60-Singhat/Singngat and Minister from Hiangtam Village. On January 27, 2001, Thangchinmang, son of Goulun become the Chief of Hiangtam village under Manipur Gazetted No. DC(CCP)/Hill-MIsc/98-1: Refer :- Hill MIsc Matter No.23 of 1999. Thangchinmang later changed Bualkot to Hiangtam and became the Chief of Hiangtam which includes Hiangtam(V)/Hiangtamjang village and Hiangtam(Bualkot).

The village is recognized village No.47 of 1956. In 2022, Chinlunthang from Hiangtam Village son of Thangkhanlal become elected Manipur Legislative Assembly member of 60 Singhat constituency. The village is a Christian village where 99% are Christian (Presbyterian). In December 2025, M Thangchinmang was taken to District hospital,Churachandpur and admitted to ICU due to old heart injury and pass away on his way to Guwahati for further treatment inside flight, 5 minutes before reaching Guwahati Airport on January 6, 2026. On 10 April 2026, Lunsianmung eldest son of M Thangchinmang and Grandson of Pu Goulun officially inherited and become the Chief of Hiangtam which covers Hiangtam(V), and Hiangtam(Bualkot)/Hiangtam via order No.4/272/2025-DC/CCP/1931 by the office of the Deputy Commissioner,Churachandpur.

== Related place names ==
The local name of Churachandpur town in Manipur is Hiangtam Lamka, or generally shortened as Lamka. Though permanent settlement in Lamka began only in 1930, the British had already built a rudimentary road from Lamka to Hiangtam as part of their effort to suppress the tribal uprising - hence the term "Hiangtam-Lamka".

In 1999, a new Zou settlement, Hiangzou, came into existence within Churachandpur town. The name, Hiangzou, was inspired by the historic Hiangtam village further south.

== Bibliography ==
- Jangkhomang Guite; Thongkholal Haokip, eds. (2019), The Anglo-Kuki War, 1917–1919: A Frontier Uprising against Imperialism during World War I, Routledge, ISBN 978-1-138-50704-3
  - Guite, Jangkhomang (2019), "'Fighting the White Men till the Last Bullet': The general course of the Anglo-Kuki War", Ibid, pp. 37–
  - Haokip, D. Letkhojam (2019), "'These Crafty Jungle Fighters': Tactics, technology and symbols of Kuki war", Ibid, pp. 118–
  - Haokip, Thongkholal (2019), "Breaking the Spirit of the Kukis: Launching the 'largest series of military operations' in the northeastern frontier of India", Ibid, pp. 93–
- Pau, Pum Khan (2012), "Tedim Road—The Strategic Road on a Frontier: A Historical Analysis", Strategic Analysis, 36 (5): 776–786, doi:10.1080/09700161.2012.712387
- Pau, Pum Khan (2019), Indo-Burma Frontier and the Making of the Chin Hills: Empire and Resistance, Taylor & Francis, ISBN 9781000507454
