= Flight 257 =

Flight 257 may refer to:

- Indian Airlines Flight 257, crashed on 16 August 1991
- Trigana Air Service Flight 257, crashed on 16 August 2015
