= Ukha Loikhai =

Village in Manipur, India

- Interactive map of Ukha Loikhai
- Location in Manipur, India Ukha Loikhai (India)
- Coordinates: 24.4603°N 93.6374°E
- Country: India
- State: Manipur
- District: Churachandpur

Population (2011)
  - Total: 418

Language(s)
  - Official: Meitei (Manipuri)
- Time zone: UTC+5:30 (IST)

Ukha Loikhai (Ukha or Loikhai) (Note: Alternative spellings: "Luaikhai" and "Loaikhai".) is a village in the Churachandpur district of Manipur, India. It is on the western slopes of the Thangjing Hill and has ongoing claims to the top of the hill itself. In the 2011 census, Ukha Loikhai had a population of 418 people. Ukha was one of the leading villages in the Kuki Rebellion of 1917–1919.

== Name ==
The village is marked as "Ukha" in the documents of the British Raj, but it is said to be locally known as "Loikhai". It is currently called "Ukha Loikhai" in official documents. The combined name also serves to distinguish it from Ukha Tampak on the eastern foothills of Thangjing Hill.

== Geography ==
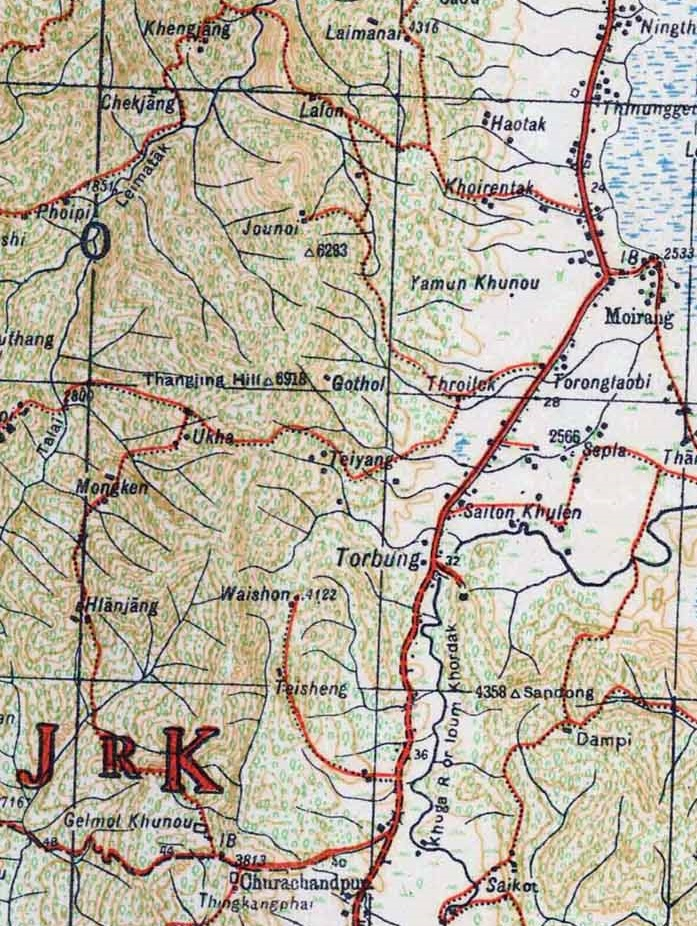
1944 Survey of India map of the region: Ukha is marked to the southwest of Thangjing Hill

Ukha is on the western slopes of Thangjing Hill, one of the tallest peaks of the state, in Churachandpur district. It is on a sloping ridge, flanked by streams on both sides, which, after reaching the bottom, join the Talai River, a tributary of the Leimatak River. Early 20th century British maps show a road passing through Ukha, which leads to Chothe Munpi in the west, and Kangvai in the east. The present-day road is similar but goes up to Henglep in the west, and runs to Torbung in the east.

Ukha is listed in the Gazetteer of Manipur as a village at an elevation of 3,500 ft (1,100 m), with a population of 150 people belonging to the "Changput subdivision of the Kongjai Kuki tribe". Its current population per 2011 census is 418, and the elevation on modern maps is 1,500 metres.

== History ==
Ukha was part of the "Haokip Reserved" area (the northern part of the present-day Churachandpur district), defined by William Alexander Cosgrave, the president of Manipur State Darbar, in 1907. The reserve was apparently reconfirmed in 1941–1942, and its borders delineated.

Ukha played a leading role in the Kuki Rebellion of 1917–1919 (also called Anglo-Kuki War). The village chief at that time was Semchung Haokip (or Semkholun Haokip). In early 1917, the local chiefs met at Ukha to discuss the emerging conflict with the British authorities. The chief of Aishan, considered the tribal chief (piba) of Thadou Kuki tribes, presided over the meeting. After Mombi was burned by the British, an all-Kuki War Council was called by the chief of Chassad, and the chiefs received a signal to resist and fight. Another meeting was held in October, with 22 chiefs attending, and a decision was made to resist. War preparations were begun immediately. In December 1917, the chief of Ukha sent 12 Kukis to collect his mithuns from Kangvai. They are said to have been fired upon by British troops, an action that so enraged the Kangvai Kukis that they joined the Ukha Kukis in their rebellion. On 19 December, the combined Kukis raided the Manipur State forest toll station at Ithai, presumably for arms and for neutralising the state forces.

On 25 December, the British Political Agent J. C. Higgins went with a force to the foothills of Thangjing Hill to punish the Ukha Kukis. The Ukha Kukis staged an able defence of the Thangjing Hill, with sniper attacks and home-made leather cannons, causing several casualties on the British troops, but no Kuki was captured. Ukha was reportedly burnt down, and the Kukis escaped into the forests. The failure of the operation and a similar one at Mombi stunned the British officers. Another attack with a larger force was launched in February 1918, with similar results. Eventually the rebellion was suppressed only by wholesale destruction of villages, including their livestock and foodgrains, and driving the people into the woods to starve, along with women and children.

During World War II, the British withdrew from Tedim to Imphal, fighting seven decisive battles along the Tedim Road. All the villages within seven kilometre distance of the road were asked to be evacuated within two days. The people of Kangvai and other villages mostly went to southwest Manipur to stay with relatives. The original intention appears to have been to stay at Ukha, but the village did not have enough food supplies to support them and it was not considered safe enough either. Modern commentators notice that no refugee camps were set up anywhere in the vicinity.

== Bibliography ==
- Churachandpur District Census Handbook (PDF), Directorate of Census Operations, Manipur, 2011
- Dun, E. W. (1992) [1886], Gazetteer of Manipur, Manas Publications – via archive.org
- Jangkhomang Guite; Thongkholal Haokip, eds. (2019), The Anglo-Kuki War, 1917–1919: A Frontier Uprising against Imperialism during World War I, Routledge, ISBN 978-1-138-50704-3
  - Guite, Jangkhomang (2019), "'Fighting the White Men till the Last Bullet': The general course of the Anglo-Kuki War", Ibid, Taylor & Francis, pp. 37–, ISBN 978-0-429-77494-2
  - Haokip, D. Letkhojam (2019), "'These Crafty Jungle Fighters': Tactics, technology and symbols of Kuki war", Ibid, Taylor & Francis, pp. 118–, ISBN 978-0-429-77494-2
  - Haokip, Thongkholal (2019), "Breaking the Spirit of the Kukis: Launching the 'largest series of military operations' in the northeastern frontier of India", Ibid, Taylor & Francis, pp. 93–, ISBN 978-0-429-77494-2
- Vaiphei, S. Lalthamuan (2022), Second World War and Southern Manipur (PDF), Aizwal: Mizoram University
