= Hiangzou =

- Village
- Location in Manipur, India Hiangzou (India)
- Country: India
- State: Manipur
- District: Churachandpur
- Founder: Khamkam Guite
- Elevation: 914.4 m (3,000 ft)

Languages
  - Official: Zou (Manipuri)
- Time zone: UTC+5:30 (IST)
- Vehicle registration: MN
- Website: manipur.gov.in

Hiangzou is a ward within Churachandpur town (also called Lamka) in Manipur, India. Situated on the bank of the Khuga (Tuitha) river, this residential settlement developed from paddy fields. Its first settler, Upa P. Tuahchinhau, moved to Hiangzou on 31 January 1999. More settlers joined within a couple of years.

Hiangzou became "a full fledged hill house tax paying village" on 10 July 2007 Village Authorities in Hill Areas) Act 1956. There are 72 houses in the village.

== Urban Sprawl ==
Hiangzou has electricity and metalled road. The growth of Hiangzou and its surrounding settlements partly reflect the urban sprawl of Lamka, (Churachandpur), which is the fastest growing town of modern Manipur.

== Location ==
Branching off from Tedim road, Hiangzou is an extension of Zoveng and Khuga Tampak (Zoveng Meitei Leikai). Previously, the area was referred to as Lower Lamka or Zenhang Lamka. New Zoveng and Zomunnuam are eastward extensions of Hiangzou.

== Background ==
Most Hiangzou residents are migrants from rural areas who fled their villages as a result of the Zomi-Kuki ethnic conflict (1997–98). In fact, a large number of them hailed from Singngat and Behiang area. The name "Hiangzou" is derived from another village, "Hiangtam" located in the Singngat-Behiang area.Hiangzou was named by Thonghoikim, wife of M.Thangchinmang manlun(chief of Hiangtam villages). Some students also live here to pursue their education in the schools and colleges of Churachandpur town.

== Neighborhood ==
Residents of Hiangzou almost exclusively belong to the Zou community. It is located adjacent to settlement site of a different community, Meitei Leikai. Most residents of Hiangzou are bilingual: they fluently speak both Zou and Meitei languages. (Meitei, also called Manipuri, is the official language of the Indian state of Manipur).

== Community life ==
Two churches -- Lutheran Bethel Church and Manipur Gam Presbyterian—are located in this ward. Majority of church members at the Lutheran Bethel Church are from Hiangzou. Some members are from other areas and wards of the Lamka town, and Bethel Church practically functions like a Free Church. The Christian Goodwill Youth Fellowship (CGYF) organizes recreational activities for the youths of Hiangzou and surrounding areas.
