= Songpi =

Songpi Old Churachandpur
- Interactive map of Songpi
- Location in Manipur, India Songpi (India)
- Coordinates: 24°20′04″N 93°39′09″E
- Country: India
- State: Manipur
- District: Churachandpur

Population (2011)
  - Total: 670

Language(s)
  - Official: Meitei
  - Regional: Paite and Thadou languages (Kuki-Chin group)
- Time zone: UTC+5:30 (IST)

Songpi (at one time called as "Churachandpur") is a village in the Churachandpur district, Manipur, India. It served as the headquarters of one of the first hill subdivisions established under the British Raj in the 1920s, which also came to be called the "Churachandpur Subdivision". Later, the Songpi cum "Churachandpur" village served as the headquarters of the Christian missionary organisation, North-East India General Mission (NEIGM).

After the British departure, a new headquarters was built at "New Churachandpur" 6 km to the east (which became the presen-day Churachandpur Town), and Songpi reverted to a regular village. The area around the old headquarters is called the Mission Compound and listed in the census as a separate village.

== Geography ==
Songpi is 6 km west of the Churachandpur Town on the Tipaimukh Road (National Highway 2).

== History ==
During the Kuki Rebellion of 1917-1919, the chief of Songpi, Semthong Haokip, refrained from taking part in the rebellion and was regarded as a "friendly" chief by the British. Songpi was also at a strategic height overlooking the valley leading to the Thangjing Hill, and used as the location of an Assam Rifles post.

=== Subdivision headquarters ===
After the rebellion, the British Raj decided to set up four subdivisions for the hill areas, one of which, the South-West Subdivision, was headquartered at Songpi. (Note: A "sub-division" in the British system was a smaller unit of administration than a district, but often larger than native units of administration such as tehsil or taluka, which were styled "circles". The whole of Manipur was a single district under the British Raj. Four sub-divisions for hill regions were created in 1919. Other than Churachandpur, there was a North-West Sub-division headquartered at Tamenglong, a North-East Sub-division headquartered at Ukhrul, and a fourth sub-division headquartered at Imphal that covered the remaining areas (extreme north and the south-east).) B. C. Gasper was appointed as the subvidivisional officer. In 1921, Gasper organised a feast to welcome back the labour corps workers that returned from World War I, to which Maharaja Churachand Singh was invited. It was decided on that occasion to give the name "Churachandpur" to the Songpi village. In due course, the subdivision headquartered here also came to be known as the "Churachandpur Subdivision". In 1930, the Sub-Divisional Officers (S.D.O.'s) were withdrawn due to dearth of staff and the subdivision was administered directly from Imphal. The Songpi/Churachandpur office fell into disuse. (Note: While two other subdivision offices, at Ukhrul and Tamenglong, were reopened due to disturbances, the Churachandpur office remained closed.)

=== Churachandpur Mission ===
Subsequently the Manipur administration sold the buildings of the Sub-Divisional Office to the North-East India General Mission (NEIGM, a Christian mission). (Note: It was originally called Indo-Burma Thadou-Kuki Pioneer Mission.) The Mission also acquired the land around the site from the chief of Songpi. A village grew up on this land, which continued to be called "Churachandpur", while the Songpi village reverted to its original name. The village was called "Churachandpur Mission" as late as 1971. It had twice the population of Songpi.

== Demographics ==
In the 2011 census, the Songpi village has a population of 554 people, and the village associated with the "Mission Compound" (Old Churachandpur) has a population of 116.

== See also ==
- List of populated places in Churachandpur district

== Bibliography ==
- Churachandpur District Census Handbook (PDF), Directorate of Census Operations, Manipur, 2011
- Chishti, S. M. A. W. (1979). Political Development in Manipur, 1919-1949 (PDF) (PhD thesis). Aligarh Muslim University – via core.ac.uk.
  - Chishti, S. M. A. W. (2005), Political Development in Manipur, 1919-1949, Gyan Publishing House, ISBN 978-81-7835-424-8
- Jangkhomang Guite; Thongkholal Haokip, eds. (2019), The Anglo-Kuki War, 1917–1919: A Frontier Uprising against Imperialism during World War I, Routledge, ISBN 978-1-138-50704-3
  - Guite, Jangkhomang (2019), "'Fighting the White Men till the Last Bullet': The general course of the Anglo-Kuki War", in Jangkhomang Guite; Thongkholal Haokip (eds.), The Anglo-Kuki War, 1917–1919, Routledge, pp. 37–, ISBN 978-1-138-50704-3
  - Haokip, Thongkholal (2019), "Breaking the Spirit of the Kukis: Launching the 'largest series of military operations' in the northeastern frontier of India", in Jangkhomang Guite; Thongkholal Haokip (eds.), The Anglo-Kuki War, 1917–1919, Routledge, pp. 93–, ISBN 978-1-138-50704-3
- Ibochou Singh, Khwairakpam (1985). British administration in Manipur 1891–1947 (PhD thesis). Gauhati University. hdl:10603/66697 – via Shodhganga.
- Singh, K. M. (1991), History of the Christian Missions in Manipur and Neighbouring States, Mittal Publications, ISBN 81-7099-285-0 – via archive.org
  - Vaiphei, Lianboi (2015), "Christian Missionaries and Colonialism in the Hills of Manipur", in Arambam Noni; Kangujam Sanatomba (eds.), Colonialism and Resistance: Society and State in Manipur, Routledge, pp. 183–, doi:10.4324/9781315638317-16 (inactive 1 July 2025), ISBN 978-1-317-27066-9
