= Kuki Students' Organisation =

Kuki Students Organisation
- KSO(Ghq) Logo
- Location: India

Kuki Students' Organisation (KSO) is a generic name of an organisation comprising many Kuki student bodies in India. It functions under a general headquarters, with districts and other branches at different states and cities of northeast India and mainland India.

== Formation ==
With the objective of forming a pan–Kuki student body an all India Kuki Students Conference was held at Tamphasana Girls High School, Imphal on 20–23 October 1958. Representatives from Assam, Naga Hills, Lushai hills, Tripura, Shillong, etc. attended the conference. The congregation felt the need for formation of a student body to take care of their problems, and if needed, to support the demand for a Kuki State. The 1960s set the tone for the installation of a full-fledged student body. KSO was formally established with a written constitution on 17 October 1963 at the residence of Shri Paokhohang Haokip (Late father of Mrs. Achin Haokip, IPS -Manipur Police), G.M. Avenue, Imphal. The first Executive members were:

- P.K. Singson - President
- Haokholun Haokip - Vice President
- Lamkhohen Misao - General Secretary
- Ngulkhohao Lhungdim - Secretary, Magazine
- Neishi Kipgen - Secretary, Debate and Extension
- Janghao Touthang - Secretary, Information

== Objectives ==
The constitution broadly provides the objectives of KSO which are:

- to promote education among the students, and sense of unity and fraternity;
- to strive towards progress and prosperity of the Kuki society;
- peaceful coexistence with all other organisations within and outside the community;
- to inculcate and develop scientific temper in the minds of the students in the pursuit and realisation of modern education system; and
- to strive for the participation and integration of all the scattered Kuki people.

== Branches ==
KSO has four state units, namely Manipur, Assam, Tripura and Nagaland. The Manipur state unit functions as the General Headquarters. There are five district units, namely Sadar Hills, Churachandpur, Chandel, Ukhrul, and Tamenglong. It has about twenty city branches in all over India. Some of the prominent city branches are Shillong branch, Delhi branch, Bangalore branch, Chennai branch, Hyderabad branch, and Mumbai branch.
