= Indian Airlines Flight 257 =

1991 aircraft accident in India

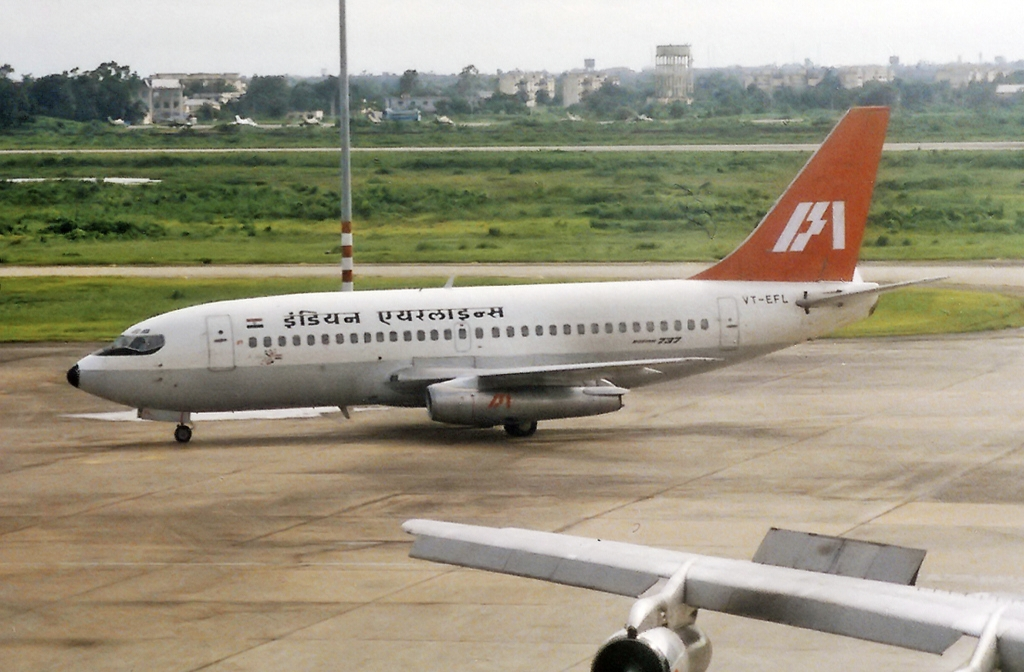
- VT-EFL, the aircraft involved in the accident, seen in 1988

Accident
- Date: 16 August 1991
- Summary: Controlled flight into terrain due to pilot error
- Site: Thangjing Hill, Manipur, India; 24°29′54″N 93°40′20″E

Aircraft
- Aircraft type: Boeing 737-2A8
- Operator: Indian Airlines
- IATA flight No.: IC257
- ICAO flight No.: IAC257
- Call sign: INDIA 257
- Registration: VT-EFL
- Flight origin: Calcutta airport, West Bengal, India
- Stopover: Imphal Municipal Airport, Manipur, India
- Destination: Dimapur Airport, Nagaland, India
- Occupants: 69
- Passengers: 63
- Crew: 6
- Fatalities: 69
- Survivors: 0

Indian Airlines Flight 257 was an Indian Airlines domestic passenger flight operating on the Calcutta–Imphal–Dimapur route. On 16 August 1991, the Boeing 737-200 registered VT-EFL crashed into the hilly terrain of Thangjing Hill during its descent, killing all 63 passengers and 6 crew members on board.

The crash was attributed to the pilot's non-adherence to the written procedure for an approach to Imphal. The crew decided to violate the approach procedure by taking a short cut and eventually slammed the aircraft into the hilly terrain. During the approach, the crew did not adequately monitor their instruments, despite the deteriorating weather condition at the time. Their actions were influenced by the pilot's decision to solely rely on his extreme familiarity with the terrain.

== Aircraft ==
The aircraft involved in the accident was a Boeing 737-2A8, delivered to Indian Airlines in 1977 with an Indian registration of VT-EFL. The aircraft had been switched from civilian aircraft to military aircraft at least twice, in 1981 and 1986, with a military registration of K2371. It had accumulated more than 33,000 total flight cycles and had undergone a major aircraft inspection in July 1990. The aircraft was equipped with two Pratt & Whitney Canada JT8D-17A engines.

The aircraft was maintained in accordance with the approved schedules. No major defects were listed in the technical log. However, it had been involved in an accident in 1978 when it struck a person during landing in Hyderabad.

== Passengers and crew ==
=== Passengers ===
There were 69 people on board, consisting of 63 passengers and 6 crew members. According to the manifest, there were 68 adults and 1 infant on board Flight 257. A total of 32 passengers were booked for Imphal and 31 were booked for Dimapur. There were no foreigners on board. Among the passengers were Irengbam Tompok, former Deputy Chief Minister of Manipur and Keisham Bira, former Minister of Education of Manipur.

=== Crew members ===
Of the 6 crew members, 2 were flight crew and the other 4 were cabin crew members. The flight was piloted by Captain Sekhar Heldar and Captain D. B. Roy Choudhury. Captain Heldar (37) had a total flying experience of 3,783 hours, of which 2,369 hours were on the Boeing 737 and the other 1,414 hours were on the Fokker F27 aircraft. Captain Roy Choudhury (26) had a total flying experience of 1,647 hours, of which 1,397 hours were on the type. Both pilots were based in Calcutta.

== Accident ==
Flight 257 took off at 11:54 a.m from Calcutta to Imphal, the capital of the Indian state of Manipur in the Northeast. The flight was supposed to take about 60 minutes and later on the aircraft would have continued its journey to Dimapur in the neighboring Nagaland state. Captain Sekhar Heldar was the pilot flying (PF) and Captain Roy Choudhury was his co-pilot. For a flight to Manipur, the aircraft was cleared to fly at 29,000 feet (8,800 m).

At 12:34 p.m, after contacting Chittagong's Comilla Airport and Tripura's Agartala, the crew was asked to contact Imphal Tower for a descent clearance. Imphal Tower granted their request and later asked the crew to descend to 10,000 feet (3,000 m) and to report back to the ATC if they had reached the VOR for the runway. Before Flight 257 had reached the VOR, Imphal Tower asked for another position report from Flight 257. The crew then requested to set course for a preparation to land at Imphal, which was granted by ATC.

The crew reported that they were above the supposed VOR. After reporting back on the VOR, they were asked to inform the tower on a procedural turn towards the airport and later were asked to descend to 5,000 feet (1,500 m). After the transmission, another Indian Airlines was about to take off from Imphal. Flight 257 then reported that they were commencing the turn. ATC later warned the crew that there was rain on the eastern area of the airport, which was acknowledged by Flight 257. The ATC then turned their attention to the departing Indian Airlines flight. Following the departure of the said flight from Imphal, the ATC then contacted the crew of Flight 257 again.

This time, there was no response. Imphal Airport lost contact with the aircraft just after 12:45, at 1,500 metres (4,900 ft) altitude on the Instrument Landing System (ILS). Several other flights then tried to contact Flight 257 as well, but there was still no response from the crew. Firefighting personnel were alerted and crew from other Indian Airlines were asked to contact on their company channel. The departing Indian Airlines aircraft was later asked to fly to the area where Flight 257 was last contacted. Due to clouds, the aircraft eventually discontinued the search and immediately flew to its intended destination of Guwahati. ATC then tried to give the crew of Flight 257 several blind calls by clearing them to land at the runway, but the transmission was met with silence again.

At 12:55 p.m, a full emergency was declared on the missing aircraft. Airport personnel immediately contacted Imphal's airport and city firefighters and ambulance services to assist with the search and rescue effort. The search and rescue area was concentrated within 5–15 miles (8.0–24.1 km; 4.3–13.0 nmi) southwest of the airport. Another Indian Airlines aircraft in the vicinity was later asked to look for the missing aircraft, but due to deteriorating weather condition the aircraft eventually discontinued the search. A few hours after the formation of a search and rescue party, several villagers reported that an aircraft had crashed somewhere in the Thangjing Hill range.

The search and rescue team eventually reached the site about 5–6 hours later. It was located in Churachandpur district at an altitude of 6,700 feet (2,000 m), just 300 feet (91 m) below the highest peak of the area, about 37 kilometres (23 mi; 20 nmi) south-west of Imphal Airport. The aircraft was destroyed as it had slammed head-on with the slope of the hill. Bodies could be seen around the wreckage. There were no survivors. All 69 passengers and crews on board Flight 257 were killed. Due to the hilly and slushy terrain, added with the heavy rain condition at the crash site, the evacuation of the bodies was hampered and had to be delayed until dawn. By 19 August, all of the bodies had been recovered and identified.

== Response ==
Indian Minister of Civil Aviation Madhavrao Scindia along with senior officials from the ministry visited the crash site on the next day. A total of 300 relatives were flown to Imphal.

Indian Airlines paid compensation to the families of the deceased at the rate of ₹500,000 Indian Rupees for each adult passenger and ₹250,000 for the one infant passenger.

== Investigation ==
On 26 September 1991, the Indian government appointed permanent judge of Calcutta Umesh Chandra Banerjee to hold a formal investigation into the crash. The investigation was assisted by members from Air India, India's Directorate General of Civil Aviation, Hindustan Aeronautics Limited, Boeing and Pratt & Whitney Canada.

=== Sabotage ===
While there was no indication that the flight had been deliberately brought down, authorities decided to investigate on the possibility of a sabotage. According to eyewitnesses, the aircraft had gone down "in a ball of fire" over the nearby Loktak Lake. Approximately one day before the crash, a separatist group based in the neighboring state of Assam had threatened a hijacking of a flight from Calcutta to Jorhat, Assam. Manipur is in Northeast India, where low-level insurgencies were raging across the region at the time.

As there was no evidence that the aircraft had been bombed, hijacked, shot down or sabotaged in any kind of way, investigators ruled out sabotage from the possible causes of the crash.

=== Flight recordings ===
Both flight recorders were recovered from the crash site in damaged condition. The data inside both recorders however was usable. Both recorders were sent to New Delhi for data extraction. The flight data recorder had only captured 5 parameters: altitude, heading, airspeed, vertical acceleration and time. The data of vertical acceleration was described as "limited" as the device had only recorded the aircraft's vertical acceleration during its take-off from Calcutta. Meanwhile, the cockpit voice recorder managed to obtain good quality of the intra-cockpit conversations.

The flight was uneventful throughout the take-off phase. After crossing Comilla Airport in Bangladesh, Flight 257 began to deviate to heading 053, significantly off to the right from its supposed heading of 007, by-passing the planned waypoint of Agartala. Instead of going over Agartala, the crew decided to fly nearly direct towards Imphal. The crew, however, reported to the controllers that they were above Agartala, even though in reality they were nowhere near the said location. The heading that had been put by the crew was maintained for approximately 12 minutes. The crew then turned the aircraft further right to heading 081 for another 9 minutes, before turning left a bit to around heading 070.

After executing the short cut, the crew reported to Imphal about the revised estimated time of arrival (ETA) of 12:42 IST, 4 minutes ahead of its previous ETA. As per the given flight plan, Flight 257 was expected to start its descent about 45 minutes after its departure from Calcutta. By taking the revised ETA into account, the aircraft should start its descent at 12:35 local time. The crew, however, decided to descend early, approximately 6 minutes short of the supposed time to commence descent. If the revised ETA was not taken into account, the aircraft had actually descended 10 minutes short of the flight plan's expected time to descend.

By 12:38 local time, Captain Heldar informed co-pilot Roy Choudhury that they were approximately 25 nautical miles (46 km; 29 mi) from Imphal, based on his observation on the geographical features in the area. About a minute later, the crew told the tower that they were 12 miles (19 km; 10 nmi) inbound, suggesting that they had covered the last 13 miles (21 km; 11 nmi) in about a minute. The crew also reported that they were near the VOR for Imphal. In truth, the aircraft was actually 15 nautical miles (28 km; 17 mi) from the VOR. The crew then asked permission from the controller to clear them to set a direct outbound track, which was granted by the ATC. According to the CVR, the crew was trying to attempt an offset entry for the airport's holding pattern.

A depiction of an offset/teardrop entry (green) to an airport holding pattern (blue). In this image, the entry is from the north. The red dot is the "fix" point. In the case of Flight 257, the entry was from the southwest and the fix point was the VOR for Imphal.

Approximately 14 nautical miles (26 km; 16 mi) southwest from the VOR, the crew reported that they were on the outbound leg, turned the aircraft to the right and announced that they were going to descend to 5,000 feet (1,500 m). The aircraft started to descend and the turn was eventually completed approximately two minutes later. By this time, the aircraft was still too far away from the airport and was nowhere near the holding pattern. With a distance of approximately 10 nautical miles (12 mi; 19 km) southwest from the airport's VOR, they were somewhere among the hills of Thangjing range.

The aircraft then changed its heading from 196 to 210 for about a minute and 35 seconds. It had descended to an altitude of 6,880 feet (2,100 m). At 12:44 p.m, one of the crew exclaimed "Two minutes up", referring to the usual expected time for an outbound leg towards the airport. In reality, the crew had only taken about one minute and 35 seconds. The crew then initiated the procedural turn to the left. As the aircraft was nowhere near any kind of navigational devices of the airport, the instruments that were supposed to tell the crew that they were on the right track (i.e. outer marker signal) eventually could not sound.

Flight 257 had gone off course from its track and eventually flew onto areas that had not been charted by the airport. Six seconds before impact, the GPWS warning repeatedly sounded. For a split second, the crew attempted to put the aircraft into a climb but due to insufficient altitude and distance between the aircraft and the terrain, collision was unavoidable.

=== Conduct of approach ===
Investigators did not note any abnormality from the approach of Flight 257 until the flight passed over Comilla Airport. As there was no more radar coverage from Comilla to Agartala and Imphal, the pilots, according to the investigators, started to innovate their own procedure and new flight plan by cutting corners in several places. The aircraft was supposed to head over to Agartala, but the crew intentionally deviated from its heading. They later gave the controller a false position report by saying that they were over Agartala, even though the aircraft was virtually nowhere near the said location. This would have given a false impression to the ATC that they had followed the flight plan. Fellow pilots who had been interviewed by investigators described the actions of the crew as "total, grossest indiscipline".

Imphal Airport was not equipped with radar. Subsequently, the ATC could not know the exact position of the pilots and could only rely on intermittent positional reports from the pilots. The controller would then assist the pilots to finally reach the airport in a safe manner, away from the mountainous terrain around the city of Imphal. Imphal Airport itself was located in a mountainous area and the weather condition was known for its unpredictability. If the pilots decided to falsify their actual position, ATC could not help much on the matter.

The decision to not head over to Agartala was probably to cut time. As a result of this short cut, the crew revised their estimated time for arrival in Imphal for approximately four minutes earlier than the previous ETA. The aircraft then inexplicably put into a descent much earlier than their expected time to descend. According to investigators, the crew probably thought that they were already near the VOR even though their actual distance was still too far from the VOR. This was probably influenced by the difference between the flight plan's airspeed and the true airspeed of the aircraft, wherein the actual airspeed was higher than the supposed airspeed, causing the crew to think that they would reach their destination much earlier than usual.

At 12:39 IST, the crew transmitted another positional report again. This time, the crew requested for a direct track to the outbound leg, even though they had not reached the VOR (fix point) for an entry to the airport's holding pattern. Their request however was immediately granted by the ATC. Fellow senior pilots reported that, for an approach to Imphal, it is necessary for pilots to fly above the VOR first (the fix point) before conducting a direct landing.

In accordance with Flight 257's flight plan and the approach chart for Imphal, Flight 257 was expected to arrive at the airport from the southwest, flying with a northeast direction with a heading of 070. It would then reach the VOR and descend from 10,000 to 8,000 feet (3,000 to 2,400 m) in order to enter the holding pattern for Imphal Airport. The VOR for Imphal was located at 24°46′01″N 93°54′28″E. The holding pattern itself was located northeast of the airport, above the city of Imphal. Upon reaching the holding pattern, the crew should proceed to the outbound leg of the teardrop entry for approximately 2 minutes and 30 seconds and descend the aircraft further to 5,000 feet (1,500 m). After completing the holding pattern, the aircraft would continue towards a turn (radial) of 217 degree with a speed of no more than 170 knots (310 km/h; 200 mph). Later, the crew should descend to 4,200 feet (1,300 m) to capture the localizer for its inbound leg. The localizer would eventually help the crew to safely land at the airport.

According to the report, the VOR was also crucial for the approach as it was used by passing aircraft as a time reference for the landing. By using the VOR, pilots could estimate the exact time that would be needed to conduct a proper entry into the airport's holding pattern. Disobeying the approach procedure by not flying over the VOR would have caused the pilots to lose, not only their time reference but also precise location that had been set by the written procedure, enabling them to fly above the areas that had not been covered by the airport's navigational aids.

At 12:11 IST, the crew stated that they were approaching the VOR of Imphal Airport, when in actuality they were still 15 nautical miles (28 km; 17 mi) south-west from the VOR. The pilots had possessed false knowledge on their exact position. A few minutes later, the aircraft turned to the right and started to descend to 10,000 feet (3,000 m). By doing so, they could not follow the airport's ILS. Flight 257 was already way off course as it was being flown across uncharted territory. Signals from the airport's beacon eventually could not be received by the aircraft as it was not flying on the proper ILS track anymore.

One of the crew later stated "two minutes up", indicating that they had accounted the exact time for the outbound leg. According to the investigation, this was also proof that the pilots had actually understood the proper procedure for an approach, however they decided to disobey it. The crew then announced that they were commencing the turn (radial). The crew thought that they were inside the protected area of the holding pattern (the inside of the holding), but the aircraft was not even in the holding pattern. It was actually somewhere between the hills southwest of the airport.

=== Decision to continue the approach ===
Local weather station reported that the sky was in overcast condition with a total of 8 okta in the area of Thangjing Hill range, meaning that the visibility would have limited the crew's vision. In addition, the crew had taken a short-cut by deviating from the approved flight track, and would transmit deliberately false reports to Imphal Airport regarding their actual position. This, as well as the deteriorating weather, led the pilots to underestimate their position and distance from Imphal as they started their approach.

Checks on the pilots flight history revealed that the pilot flying (PF) of Flight 257, Captain Heldar, had previously made at least 36 flights to Imphal. Indian Airlines did not limit how often pilots could use the same route, so some pilots occasionally chose to fly one specific route over and over again. Over time, Captain Heldar requested that flights to Imphal be assigned to him, leading to him becoming very familiar with the route. This seems to have led Captain Heldar to be somewhat over-confident in his ability to navigate purely by instinct. In the CVR recording at 12:38 IST, Captain Heldar could be heard saying "this is one hill, that is another hill and in between the two." His familiarity with the terrain around Imphal seems to have caused Haldar to base his time distance calculations on seemingly-familiar terrain features, rather than the data from the aircraft's instruments.

While there were clear violations of the proper procedure for an approach to Imphal, Captain Heldar was accompanied by Captain Roy Choudhury acting as co-pilot. Captain Roy Choudhury should have corrected Captain Heldar's actions, but the CVR indicated that he did not give any kind of caution, advice or corrective responses to Captain Heldar's actions. Investigators described his demeanor on the entire flight as that of a "mere passive and mute spectator". Hence, Captain Roy Choudhury was also blamed by the investigators for being equally undisciplined and lacking in professionalism.

=== Conclusion ===
The final report was submitted to the Indian government on 30 April 1992, approximately eight months after the accident. The investigation concluded the cause of the crash as follows:

The accident occurred by reason of a grave error on the part of the Pilot-in-Command in not adhering to the operational flight plan and ILS let down chart and not realizing that his early descent to 10,000 feet (3,000 m) and turning right for outbound leg without reporting overhead VOR would result in loss of time reference and as such misplace him in the hilly terrain. The Pilot-in-Command's action may have been influenced by his extreme familiarity with the terrain.

— Board of Inquiry

As a result of the crash, a total of 50 recommendations were issued by members from the Board of Inquiry, particularly on flight crew training and discipline. The Board of Inquiry also issued a recommendation for the establishment of an independent investigative body for transport accidents in India.

== See also ==
- Indian Airlines Flight 113 the cause of the accident is error of judgment on the part of the Pilot-in-command as well as the Co-pilot associated with poor visibility which was not passed to aircraft.
- Alliance Air Flight 7412, an Indian air disaster which was caused by the crew's decision to violate approach procedure.
- Aviastar Flight 7503, pilots decided to deviate from their designated route and took a short cut over mountainous area.
- Aerosvit Flight 241, confused flight crews falsified their position to the ATC and decided to re-orient themselves, causing the aircraft to crash into a mountain.
