= Leimatak River =

Leimatak Leimata
- Location within Manipur Location within India

Location
- Country: India
- State: Manipur

Physical characteristics
- Source: Mamun Lhang peak
  - location: Churachandpur district
  - coordinates: 24.385°N 93.546°E
  - elevation: 1,699 metres (5,574 ft)
- 2nd source: Nungsai hills
  - location: Churachandpur district
  - coordinates: 24.558°N 93.535°E
  - elevation: 1,692 metres (5,551 ft)
- Mouth: Irang
  - location: near Tamlok, Tamenglong district
  - coordinates: 24°49′20″N 93°30′22″E
  - elevation: 250 metres (820 ft)
- Length: 74.6 km (46.4 mi)
- Basin size: 627 km^{2} (242 sq mi)

Basin features
- Progression: Irang, Barak
- River system: Brahmaputra
- Tributaries
  - left: Thingbong
  - right: Talai, Iring

The Leimatak River (or Leimata River) is an upstream tributary of the Barak River in Manipur, India. It originates in the Churachandpur district near the Mamun Lhang peak (or Khaorang peak), and flows north for 34 km (21 mi) before entering the Noney district. After flowing an equal amount of distance in the Noney district, it enters the Tamenglong district, where it drains into the Irang River, a major tributary of the Barak River.

== Course ==
The Mamun Lhang peak (1,699 m) is on a mountain range to the west of the Thangjing Hills range, running roughly parallel to it. The main head stream of Leimatak River, called Tuibin river, comes down from the peak on its west, flowing north. A second head stream, called Thingbong, flows south from the hills around the Nungsai peak (1,692 m). The two streams meet near the Thangsi village and form the Leimatak River, flowing due northeast.

A tributary called Talai flows parallel to Tuibin/Leimatak, east of the Mamun Lhang range and west of the Thangjing Hills range collecting drainage from both.

The combined river flows northeast till the base of the Thangjing Hills range, and turns northwest, near the village of L. Phaikholum. The Leimatak Power Station is located here. Also called the Loktak Power Station, it is powered by water from Loktak Lake, via a pipeline that is tunnelled through the Thangjing Hills. The Loktak Lake is at an elevation of 768 m above sea level, and the power station on Leimatak is at an elevation of 454 m. The resulting head is used to generate 105 MW of power.

Near the Pinjang village in the Noney district, the Cachar–Bishnupur Road (or "Old Cachar Road") crosses the Leimatak River. The bridge is known as the Leimatak Bridge, and the locality itself is called "Leimatak" in historical documents.

Near Awangkhal, a tributary called Iring joins the Leimatak River, which flows down from Noney in the northeast. The combined river flows west in the channel of Iring to join the Irang River near Tamlok. The Cachar-Imphal Road (or "New Cachar Road", part of National Highway 37) runs in the valley of Iring, crossing the Irang River close to the confluence with Leimatak.

The overall length of the Leimatak River is 74.6 km (46.4 mi) and the basin area is 627 km^{2} (242 sq mi).

== History ==
The Old Cachar Road was the primary travel route between Manipur and the Indian plains. It was traversed often by traders, travellers, troops, as well as the rulers when they fled Burmese occupation. In one of the first such events, the ruler Ching-Thang Khomba (also called Bhagyachandra or Jai Singh, r. 1759–1798) fled Manipur during a Burmese occupation and used Cachar as his base. He is said to have made four attempts to oust the Burmese between 1775 and 1782, but beaten back each time. After 1782, the Burmese withdrew and left the kingdom to the ruler.

Even 1786, Ching-Thang Khomba mobilised his forces to attack the Kuki tribes to the west of the Leimatak River valley, based at a village called "Khongchai" in the Tuipui River valley. (Note: Tuipui river is another tributary of the Irang River that flows north, parallel to the Leimatak River.) The forces travelled up the Leimatak River valley up to a location called the Kuchu valley in the Tuibin headstream (at coordinates 24°26′57″N 93°32′36″E estimated by the Kuki Research Forum scholars), where they made their base. They also constructed a temporary royal residence there. From this base, they attacked the Khongjai villages (Kuki villages) in the Tuipui river valley across the hill range to the west. The name "Kuchu" was apparently reused to name the king's court in the Kangla Complex, probably in remembrance of the victory over the Khongjais.

After Manipur became a British protectorate, c. 1830, a frontier military post of Manipur was located at "Leimatak", possibly at the crossing of the Old Cachar Road. Other posts in the west were at the Khoupum valley and "Moirung Hills" (Thangjing Hills).

== Bibliography ==
- Churachandpur District Census Handbook (PDF), Directorate of Census Operations, Manipur, 2011
- Harvey, G. E. (1925). History of Burma: From the Earliest Times to 10 March 1824. London: Frank Cass & Co. Ltd – via archive.org.
- Parratt, Saroj Nalini Arambam (2009). The Court Chronicle of the Kings of Manipur: The Cheitharon Kumpapa, Volume 2. Foundation Books / Cambridge University Press India. ISBN 978-81-7596-854-7.
