= Zoveng =

- Ward
- Location in Manipur, India Zoveng (India)
- Coordinates: 24.3488°N 93.7029°E
- Country: India
- State: Manipur
- District: Churachandpur

Languages
  - Official: (Manipuri)
- Time zone: UTC+5:30 (IST)
- Vehicle registration: MN
- Website: manipur.gov.in

Zoveng (Zoukhopi) is one of the oldest wards within the Churachandpur Town (also called Lamka) in the Indian state of Manipur. This residential area is mostly located along S. Chinzagin Road and Zoveng-Kaivung Road along Bijang Loubuk Government School that branches off from Tedim road. The ward has a high concentration of ethnic Zou and mostly Zou/Zo people communities.

The Zogal Memorial Hall is located in Zoveng. The Hall was constructed in memory of the Zogal also known as the Kuki Rising(1917–19) against the British in History. Presently Zoveng is also known as the Heart of Lamka.
