= William Alexander Cosgrave =

British administrator in India

Sir William Cosgrave CIE

Chief Commissioner of the Andaman and Nicobar Islands
- In office 1935–1938

Personal details
- Born: 1879
- Died: 11 September 1952

Sir William Alexander Cosgrave, CIE (1879 – 11 September 1952) was a British administrator in India. A member of the Indian Civil Service, he was Chief Commissioner of the Andaman and Nicobar Islands from 1935 until 1938.

== Biography ==
The son of H. A. Cosgrave, JP, of County Dublin, William Cosgrave was educated at Shrewsbury School and Trinity College, Dublin, where he was a classical scholar. He passed into the Indian Civil Service in 1903 and was posted to the Bengal.

Cosgrave was appointed a CIE in 1931 and was knighted in 1938.
