= Churachandpur =

Churachandpur Lamka
- Interactive map of Churachandpur
- Location in Manipur, India Churachandpur (India)
- Coordinates: 24°20′46″N 93°42′00″E
- Country: India
- State: Manipur
- District: Churachandpur
- Named for: Churachand Singh, the Maharaja of Manipur Kingdom
- Elevation: 800 m (2,600 ft)

Population (2022)
  - Total: 120,000

Language(s)
  - Official: Meitei (Note: Meitei language (officially known as Manipuri language) is the official language of Manipur.)
  - Regional: Paite, Thadou and other Kuki-Chin-Mizo languages
- Time zone: UTC+5:30 (IST)
- PIN: 795128
- Telephone code: 03874
- Vehicle registration: MN 02

Churachandpur (IPA: /tʃʊRVːˌtʃaːnɗpʊr/), locally known as Lamka is the second largest town in the Indian state of Manipur and the district headquarters of the Churachandpur district. The name "Churachandpur" was transferred from the earlier headquarters of the region at Songpi to the present location, (Note: It was referred to as "New Churachandpur" during the 1950s and 1960s.) and honours Churachand Singh, former maharaja of the Manipur princely state. The local people reject the name as a colonial imposition and prefer using the native name "Lamka".

Churachandpur is not a statutory town and does not have a municipality. It is governed by the Autonomous District Council of the Churachandpur district.

== Name ==
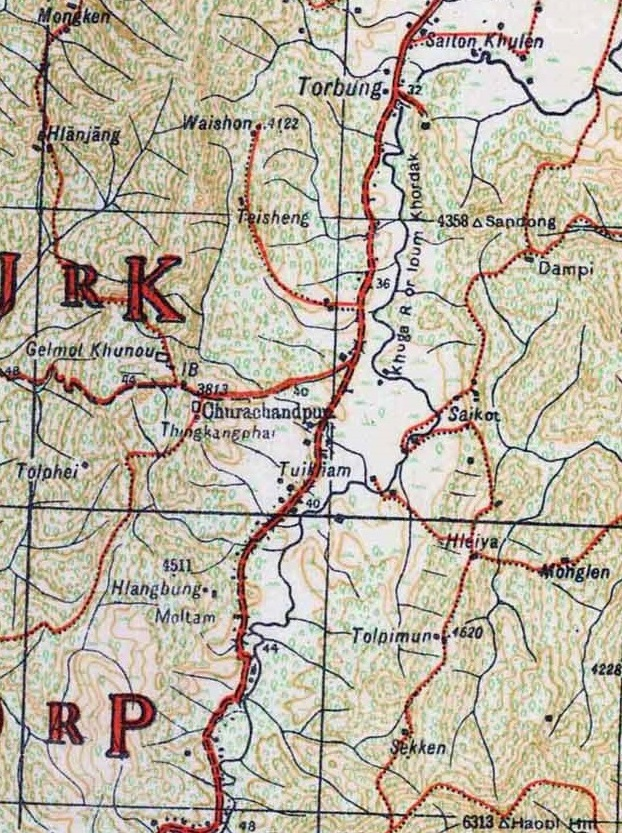
Old and New Churachandpur towns in a 1944 Survey of India map. The location marked as Churachandpur is the old Churachandpur (Songpi). The new location is at the junction of Tedim Road (then called Hiangtam Road) and Tipaimukh Road.

The name "Chura Chandpur" was originally given to the village of Songpi in 1921, where the British Raj administration had previously established a subdivision office. (Note: A "sub-division" in the British system was a smaller unit of administration than a district, but often larger than native units of administration such as tehsil or taluka, which were styled "circles". The whole of Manipur was a single district under the British Raj. Four sub-divisions for hill regions were created in 1919. Other than Churachandpur, there was a North-West Sub-division headquartered at Tamenglong, a North-East Sub-division headquartered at Ukhrul, and a fourth sub-division headquartered at Imphal that covered the remaining areas (extreme north and the south-east).) The name was coined in honour of Churachand Singh, the reigning maharaja of the Manipur princely state at that time. The Khuga river valley, the present site of Churachandpur was forested and mostly uninhabited at that time. In 1930, the Sub-Divisional Officers (S.D.O.'s) were withdrawn due to dearth of staff and the subdivision was administered directly from Imphal. The Songpi/Churachandpur office fell into disuse. (Note: While two other subdivision offices, at Ukhrul and Tamenglong, were reopened due to disturbances, Churachandpur remained closed.)

Around the time of Indian independence, the new administration set up under the Manipur State Constitution decided to establish administrative circles in the state, with one of them based at Churachandpur. Finding that the old offices at Songpi were unusable, they decided to build a new headquarters near Hiangtam Lamka, under the name "New Churachandpur". This eventually gave the name Churachandpur to the entire area, at least in the official parlance.

The village called Hiangtam Lamka was established in the 1920s. It was at the junction ("lamka" in Kuki-Chin languages) of the Hiangtam Road the British laid during the Kuki Rebellion of 1917–1919, and the pre-existing Tipaimukh Road. With the rise of new villages surrounding it after the independence, the area around the road junction came to be called "Lamka", and the whole plain in the Khuga River valley "Lamka plain".

The local people are said to have always used the name "Lamka" for the town in preference to "Churachandpur". With the rise of ethnic tensions during the 2023–2025 Manipur violence, the Kuki-Zo people have increasingly spurned the name "Churachandpur".

== Geography ==
The Churachandpur town is in the valley of Khuga River (called "Lamka plain"), which flows north from the southern border of the state towards the Imphal Valley. The town is at the intersection of two roads: the Tedim Road, which runs from the Manipur state capital Imphal to the Tedim Town in the Chin State of Myanmar, and the Tipaimukh road that goes to Tipaimukh in the southwest corner of the state and continues on to Mizoram. The junction of the two roads is called "Lamka" in Kuki-Chiin languages. At present, the northern portion of the Tedim Road and the Tipaimukh Road make up the National Highway 2, connecting the states of Assam, Nagaland, Manipur and Mizoram. In addition to these roads, the road to Sugnu via the Tuineng valley also leaves from the Churachandpur town.

Churachandpur is a sprawling urban agglomeration, said to be the second largest town in Manipur. However it is not a statutory town and does not have a municipality. The region is divided into multiple villages and towns, under the supervision of the Autonomous District Council of the Churachandpur District. Notable among the towns are Hiangtam Lamka, west of Tedim Road, Zenhang Lamka, east of Tedim Road, and Rengkai to the southeast, apart from other town wards like Kamdou Veng.

== History ==
The Khuga River Valley, the location of the present-day Churachandpur Town, was forested and mostly uninhabited at the time of the Kuki Rebellion of 1917–1919. However, it was used for grazing mithuns (also called metna), of which the chief of Ukha, was the largest owner in the area. Prior to the Kuki Rebellion, the British had also allowed some number of Nepali ex-servicemen to settle in the valley and use it for grazing cattle. The destruction caused by the cattle to the crops of the Kuki people in the surrounding areas was considered a significant grievance causing antipathy towards the British administration. The Nepalis were however loyal to the British, paid regular taxes, and also supplied ghee to the British troops. One of the first events of the Kuki Rebellion was to raid the Nepali graziers of the Khuga Valley on 28 December 1917, which was carried out by the Thadou and Zou tribes jointly.

Also during the Rebellion, the British constructed a road to Hiangtam in the southern part of the subdivision, which branched off the Tipaimukh road at a location that lataer came to be called "Hiangtam Lamka". It became the site of a new village. (Note: "Lamka" means "crossroads" in the Kuki languages. "Hiangtam Lamka" was the village at the intersection of the Tipaimukh road and the Hiangtam road (now called "Tedim Road").)

During the World War II, the British constructed a motorable "Tedim Road" between Imphal and Tedim, extending the former Hiangtam Road. Seven decisive battles were fought along this road between the British 17 Indian Division and the Japanese 33 Division. The Japanese reached the Churachandpur area on 8 April 1944, and four battles were fought to the north of it, within Manipur, including one at Torbung. Eventually the Japanese were defeated at Imphal and withdrew from Manipur with heavy losses.

=== Independent period ===
In 1947, on the eve of Indian independence, the Maharaja's administration decided to form circles for local administration, designating two of them as Churachandpur Circle and Thanlon Circle respectively. Finding that the old offices at Songpi had been reused for other purposes, in 1949, it decided to construct a town called "New Churachandpur" next to Hiangtam Lamka to serve as the headquarters for the Churachandpur Circle. After Manipur's merger with India, the two Circles were combined into a Subdivision based at New Churachandpur. The name "New Churachandpur" was used for at least two decades, until 1969. In that year, the subdivision was converted into a district and the prefix "New" was dropped. Tourist guide books continued to use the term well into the 1990s.

Under the township of "New Churachandpur" the area grew rapidly. The 1971 census mentioned five areas comprising the town:

1. Churachandpur Headquarters – 0.35 km^{2} (0.14 sq mi)
2. Hill Town – 0.32 km^{2} (0.12 sq mi)
3. Hiangtam Lamka (or Hiangtam Lamka, "Upper Lamka") – 0.14 km^{2} (0.054 sq mi)
4. Zenhang Lamka ("Lower Lamka") – 0.29 km^{2} (0.11 sq mi)
5. Rengkai – 0.41 km^{2} (0.16 sq mi)

The Churachandpur Town was described as the third largest in Manipur in 1971.

The Churachandpur Town was however "denotified" in 1988 upon the recommendation of the Hill Areas Committee, and its area was placed under the Churachandpur Autonomous District Council. The 1991 census listed it as a Census Town, but the practice has since been discontinued. The whole area is considered "rural" for administrative purposes despite having clear urban characteristics. The 2011 census lists three census towns in the region, viz., Rengkai, Zenhang Lamka, and Hill Town (to the west of Hiangtam Lamka).

== Demographics ==
The population of the Churachandpur Town is approximately 120,000 people. The majority of the population consists of Kuki-Zo people, with the dominant segment being the Paite tribe. The Paite language is considered the lingua franca of the town.

The town also contains 18 villages (neighbourhoods) with Meitei populations, totalling approximately 8,350 people. Almost all the Meitei were internally displaced during the 2023–2025 Manipur violence.

== See also ==
- List of populated places in Churachandpur district

== Bibliography ==
- Churachandpur District Census Handbook (PDF), Directorate of Census Operations, Manipur, 2001
- Churachandpur District Census Handbook (PDF), Directorate of Census Operations, Manipur, 2011
- Chishti, S. M. A. W. (1979). Political Development in Manipur, 1919-1949 (PDF) (PhD thesis). Aligarh Muslim University – via core.ac.uk.
  - Chishti, S. M. A. W. (2005), Political Development in Manipur, 1919-1949, Gyan Publishing House, ISBN 978-81-7835-424-8
- Ibochou Singh, Khwairakpam (1985). British administration in Manipur 1891–1947 (PhD thesis). Gauhati University – via Shodhganga.
- Jangkhomang Guite; Thongkholal Haokip, eds. (2019), The Anglo-Kuki War, 1917–1919: A Frontier Uprising against Imperialism during World War I, Routledge, ISBN 978-1-138-50704-3
  - Guite, Jangkhomang (2019), "'Fighting the White Men till the Last Bullet': The general course of the Anglo-Kuki War", in Jangkhomang Guite; Thongkholal Haokip (eds.), The Anglo-Kuki War, 1917–1919, Routledge, pp. 37–, ISBN 978-1-138-50704-3
  - Haokip, Thongkholal (2019), "Breaking the Spirit of the Kukis: Launching the 'largest series of military operations' in the northeastern frontier of India", in Jangkhomang Guite; Thongkholal Haokip (eds.), The Anglo-Kuki War, 1917–1919, Routledge, pp. 93–, ISBN 978-1-138-50704-3
  - Ningmuanching (2019), "'As Men of One Country': Rethinking the history of the Anglo-Kuki War", in Jangkhomang Guite; Thongkholal Haokip (eds.), The Anglo-Kuki War, 1917–1919, Routledge, pp. 168–197, ISBN 978-1-138-50704-3
  - Zou, David Vumlallian (2019), "Patriots and Utilitarians in the Anglo-Kuki War", in Jangkhomang Guite; Thongkholal Haokip (eds.), The Anglo-Kuki War, 1917–1919, Routledge, pp. 168–197, ISBN 978-1-138-50704-3
- Guite, M. Pauminsang; Vualzong, Langthianmung (2018), "Community Resilience Building and the Role of Paitei Tribe of Churachandpur in Manipur", in Amita Singh; Milap Punia; Nivedita P. Haran; Thiyam Bharat Singh (eds.), Development and Disaster Management: A Study of the Northeastern States of India, Springer, pp. 331–348, ISBN 9789811084850
