= Kuki Rebellion of 1917–1919 =

1917-1919 Tribal revolt against the British Empire

Kuki Rebellion Anglo-Kuki War
- Part of Tribal revolts in India before independence
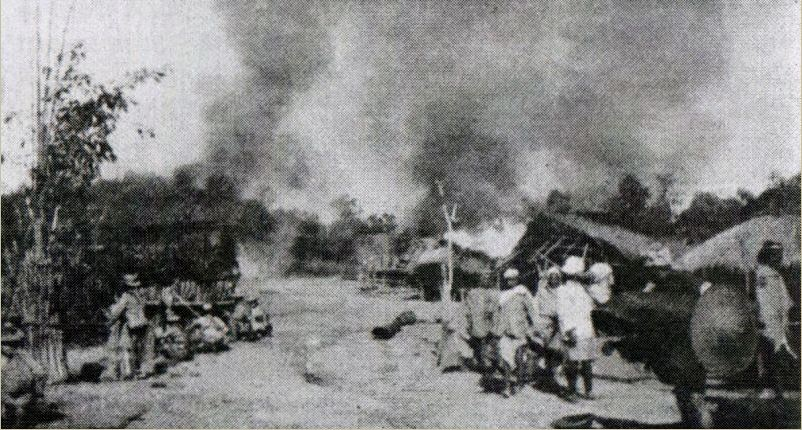
- The Burning of Longya
Date	1917 - 1919
Location	Manipur; Naga Hills; North Cachar Hills; Chin Hills; Kabaw Valley; Somra Tract
Result	British victory

Belligerents
British Raj	Kuki chiefs Chin chiefs

Commanders and leaders
Henry Keary; L.W. Shakespear; C.E. Macquoid; Francis Tuker; M.C. Coote	Chengjapao (Chief of Aishan); Khutinthang (Chief of Jampi); Pache (Chief of Chassad); Ngullen (Chief of Khongjang)

Strength
6,234	unknown

Casualties and losses
60 killed 142 wounded 97 died of disease	120 killed (est.); 126 villages burned

The Kuki Rebellion or Anglo-Kuki War also known as the Kuki Rising (Zou: Zou Gal), was a tribal revolt during the British colonial rule in India during World War One.

It was a rebellion by the Kuki tribes of Manipur, ostensibly to resist their forcible recruitment into labour corps for the First World War. From a wider historical perspective, it can also be read as a response to the colonial intrusion into Kuki livelihoods, with new forms of economic relations and land policies, as well as the declining authority of Kuki chiefs. The colonial government responded with military operations which burned at least 126 Kuki villages and several food stocks, which the government deemed necessary to suppress the rebellion. During 2017–2019, the Kuki community of Manipur arranged centennial commemorations for the event at multiple locations in Manipur. Their celebration of the event as a "war" came into contestation by the Meitei and Naga communities of Manipur.

== Background ==
Ashok Kumar Ray gives four causes for the uprising. These are the labour recruitment drives for World War One, the corruption of lambus, customary payments to hillmen on Pothang or for foreign service, and house tax. Lambus were hill advisors and administrators who gained influence in Manipur and became infamous for corruption and bribery practices. This behaviour also challenged the prestige and authority of the Kuki chiefs, thus leading to resentment. Historians have argued that the Kukis were led by their chiefs to rebel against the British due to fear of exploitation of their traditional village authority and chieftainship. Under direct administraiton in Manipur since 1982, the Hill men were made to pay house tax and forced labour (pothang). Taxes were raised double for small villages to discourage the splitting of villages. The Kukis resented the regime and some had left to maintain independence to unadministered areas or reject British demands. This tax boycott led to an expedition in 1910 against the Aishan tribe.

Zou outlines that the chiefs also held a fear of the overseas and the absence of able-bodied men to sustain crops and cultivation of the land. Traditional beliefs also played a role. The siampu (transl. priest) could not perform kithoina (transl. ritual) for healing sick people without the head of the family present at the rite. This belief also applied to communal feasting which did not occur normally with absent family members. Other reasons cited were the romantic courtships of the tribal youth. Girls in villages courted boys, spreading rumours about bad omens and dreams of overseas journeys.

Historian Jankhomang Guite points out that resistance in colonies to enlistment for the World War 1 were also experienced in Africa with passive resistance. France experienced armed rebellions in Bélédougou, West Volta, South Constantinois, Tunisia and Benin; the British in Kenya, Southern Nyasaland (Zimbabwe), Egypt and Nigeria. In India, such resistance resonated with the Santhal Rebellion in Orissa and the Northwest Frontier, which experienced five uprisings

With the outbreak of war, the Kukis were subject to rumours that the Germans were winning the war and the British were withdrawing from India. Another rumour detailed that labour corps, which was intended to be a non-combat role, were being used on the front lines and guaranteeing death.

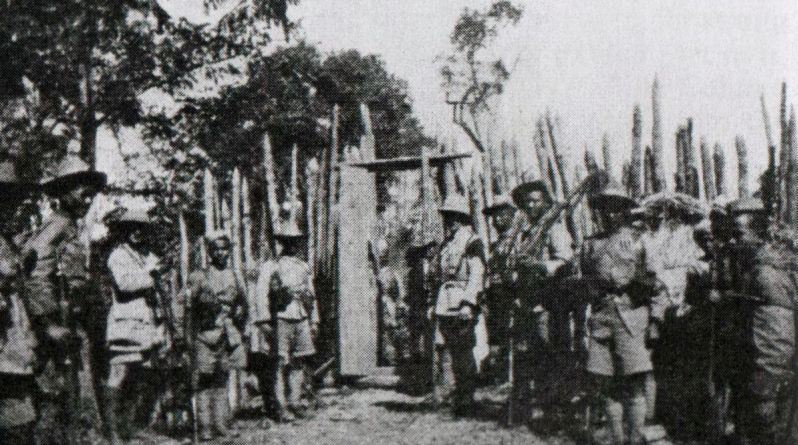
Coote and Higgins inside the Mombi Stockade

The British entered into negotiations, and some tribes gave in. The Kukis, however, remained adamant and opposed the conscription. The chiefs who cooperated with the British were mostly Christian converted chiefs. The traditional animists chiefs held a belief in khuarum which protected them in their jurisdiction of rule. In particular, the Chiefs of Mombi and Longyi refused to cooperate. When warned, they retorted that any attempts to punish them would see them use force in retaliation. In September, Captain Coote with 100 rifles marched to Mombi to investigate the issue but was met with a skirmish which destroyed the village. Attempts to reach Longyi was halted and the negotiations with Kukis were resumed. The negotiations concerned the wife of H.W.G. Cole, who personally knew the chief of Mombi. The Mombi chiefdom had been making raids into the Manipur Valley while Cole was in France. The Mombi Chief, Ngulkhup, agreed to negotiate and met with Mrs Cole, who was accompanied by an interpreter. Mrs Cole met with Ngkhulp but was frustrated as he did not listen to reason. Mrs Cole returned to Imphal. Negotiations failed, and J.C. Higgins took 50 soldiers to Mombi Kuki village and burned it down on 17 October 1917. The Political Officers in Manipur were reprimanded for the burning of Mombi and forbidden to use force for labour recruitment. No Military expeditions were permitted without the sanction of the Government of India. The Political Agent however, sensing the preparations for war, applied for punitive action to induce submission. The Government of India invoked the doctrine of minimum force to be used only for preserving order.

== Planning ==
The rebellion was planned in coordination with the Grand Chiefs-in-council in several regions, who decided to wage war against the British. A total of 150 chiefs met during the assembly and resolved to not obey any orders or sommon from Government and to fight any attempts to enforce order. A ritual was performed known as sathin-salung-neh (transl. feasting on the liver and heart). The confederation of Kuki chiefs at Aisan, Chassad, Jampi and Khongjang formed the basis of the revolt. Colonel H.W.G. Cole, the political agent of Manipur, recorded that the Kuki chiefs had taken an oath via killing a mithun that no one would go to France or send their subjects there. The four chiefs who made this oath were: Chengjapao (Chief of Aishan), Khutinthang (Chief of Jampi), Pache (Chief of Chassad) and Ngullen (Chief of Khongjang). Khutinthang had already shown hostility by prohibiting the entrance of lambus into his village, seizing their property, and destroying it.

The Zou chiefs made an alliance with the Haokip (Thadou) of Ukha and Mombi. There was another meeting at Haopi peak (Tuidam) to decide on the practical strategies of the resistance. Considerations included breakdown of British stockades during the rain and to punish friendly villages of the British. The Zou's backed the Haokip and threatened to attack Thiangkangphai village when travelling to Ukha as it was friendly to the British. The Zou at Ukha reinforced the Haokip and settled along the IMphal and Khana River valleys. They fired upon the British. The Gotengkot encounter saw high casualties on British forces.

The Kukis began sending messages through traditional communication channels. The messages were disseminated to the Kuki tribes in Manipur, the Naga Hills, the North Cachar Hills, the Chin Hills, Thaungdut State, and the Somra Tract. The messengers used thingkhuo-le-malcha, a relayed message of unity to face against a common enemy in an emergency. The contacted villages sent messengers to further villages and spread the scheme. The tribes involved ranged from Thadou tribes, Zou tribes and the Chin tribes.

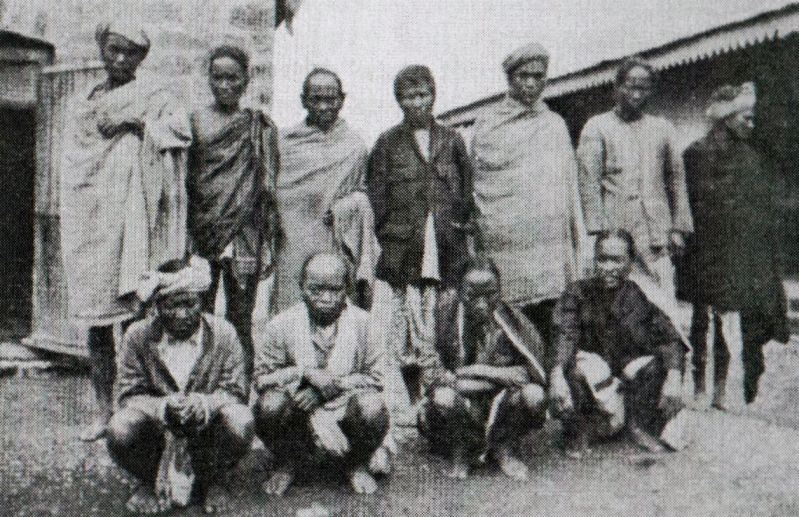
Kuki prisoners of War

== Conflict ==
The beginning of the war is debated. Generally it is stated as December 1917 following draft opposition in March 1917. 10 December 1917 was given as the official day of the beginning of the outbreak as that is when the attack on Itoll Station occurred according to the Assam Government. The Burmese Government fixes it at 21 December when the 'revolt' broke out.

J.C. Higgins became the Political Officer of Manipur and led a column of 160 rifles into the hills in December 1917. The Kuki's resisted the column with the use of guerrilla warfare. They utilised old flintlock and muzzle-loaders alongside their pumpi (leather cannons) using homemade gunpowder. The pumpi was a tightly bound leather rolled into a compact tube and bound with leather strips. A vent is made, and gunpowder is poured in with slugs or stones. It was activated by hand or tripwire but could mostly be used once. The British described them as snipers who did not rush their camps. The Kukis would routinely target the British soldiers and the subordinates over soldiers in the column. The raids by the Mombi and Longya chiefs were soon joined by the Hinglep and Ukah in the surrounding hills. A raid on the Itoll Police Thana near Shuganoo and another raid on Moirang led to the Assam Rifles at Imphal being dispatched. A group of 80 men were assigned to Lieutenant Halliday towards Mombi and another 80 was assigned to Captain Coote and Lieutenant Hooper to Hinglep. Halliday was overwhelmed during engagement and withdrew to Imphal. Coote succeeded in Moirang where he punished the allied tribes of the kuki chiefs. As a result of this escalation, the southern and southwestern hills became an activie rebellion zone and closed the roads to Burma, destroyed telegraph lines and killed officials.

In December 1918 the British stationed themselves and built a military post at Sugunu. Political agent of Manipur, Cosgrave and Lieutenant Halliday marched to punish the Mombi rebels. The Zou ambushed them at Tuibom at the crossing of the Chakpi River. Cosgrave thus retreated due to the disabling of his advance by casualties. The bodies of Halliday's killed men were thrown into a ravine with their heads, hands and feet cut off. The Zou fighters composed a hla (transl. song) of the encounter.

Tuizum pan leidou hing khang el; tuonglam ah mataan ing e,
Tuonglam ah mataan ing e; Tuibom ah lal luong awng e!
English:
The enemies had come to invade us; I lay and waited for them on the way
My enemies groaned in pain, at the Tuibom river point!

In late 1917, the Southern Chin Hills in Burma also began to call for the services of the Assam Rifles. The Chin Hills' attempt to raise a labour corps aggravated tribal discontent. In early December 1917, the southern Chins began a rising and surrounded Haka Station. The British in Haka requested urgent assistance. Captain Falkland of the Assam Rifles in Aizawl marched with 150 soldiers to Haka. During the march, another wire from Falam also requested help. Captain Montifiore of the Assam Rifles in Kohima marched with 150 soldiers to relieve them.

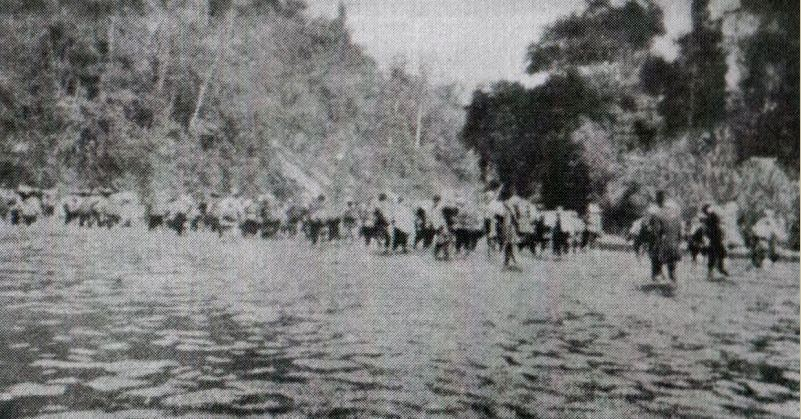
Montefiore's Column crossing a river in the Chin Hills

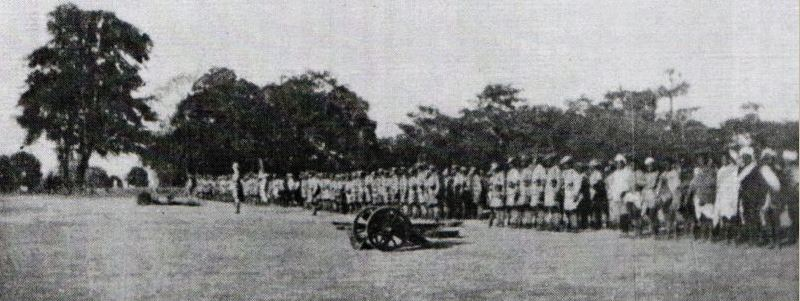
Coote and Higgins preparing their columns at Imphal

At Imphal, two columns were trained by 22 January 1918. 120 rifles were assigned each to Captain Coote and Political Agent Higgins to move through Mombi and Longyi. The two columns left Imphal on 23 January 1918. The village of Longyi was destroyed for its participation in the raid on the police Thana. Coote reached the old site of Mombi which had been burned in September by him. He encamped there and the next day discovered the new village of Mombi, 4 miles east of him. The new village was destroyed. Coote and the column moved towards Longyi and discovered that Steadman's column from Chin Hills had arrived at Longyi and burnt it quickly when they arrived on 27 January. Coote continued to punish the remaining villages under Mombi. He reached Nungoinuw with a strong stockade, which was evacuated when his column reached it. His second settlement found was already destroyed.

On 27 January 1918, Captain Steadman's column marched from Lenakot to Khullen Khoilet village located in South Manipur along the Imphal River. Steadman met no resistance at Longya (Chief Ngulbul's village), which they burned. Steadmen then crossed the river and climbed a hill to plan an attack on a Haika village. However, at Gotengkot, they met fierce opposition from the Zou and Haokip fighters. Steadman lost 11 men, and several were wounded. Gotengkot was defended under the combined leadership of Doungul, Thongkhai, Ngulbul, Somthawng, Samkhohau, Amvum and others. Doungul and his men fired at the British advancing troops while Mangvung (Haokip chief) released stone traps that rolled down the slope and killed the soldiers. Chief Doungul, standing in the front line in the ensuing shootout, was shot in the chest and died later on. Captain Steadman was seriously injured. His interpreter, Paudailou Sukte, was also killed in the fight. Reinforcements were sent through Coote's column, but the Zous and Haokips had escaped into the jungle.

In the village of Buhsau, which was a Zou village near the military post at Muollum village, an open encounter occurred. Local sources claim the villagers were sick on their deathbeds due to an epidemic outbreak. The British raided them at midnight, and Chief Hengthang surrendered. However, Hengthang was shot dead with his whole family, and all other sick individuals were also killed, including children and women. The British sources, such as Cosgrave's diary, record that the British camped at Muollum and attacked the village, burning the houses and marching to Singngat. The next day, at 7am 17 March, Singngat was attacked by the British. Only one shot was fired by the Zous on the way to the village. The villagers evacuated the village and the British encamped in it, counting 47 houses.

Following Singngat, Hiangtam (Hengtham) was targeted which was the headquarters of the Zou rebels of the rebellion. The chief of Hiangtam was Goulun. Local sources state that the British sent a message to the Zou to sdurrender or they would drop bombs on the village. The fighters were said to have responded with "Vanleng a na'ng len ulehg ahgochieng a ka'ng na satkhiet ding uh'" (transl. If you would attack us with an aeroplane we would strike you down with a long stick). This story became the basis for many songs. During the battle of Hiangtam, the Zou used a significant number of Siallum thau (transl. leather cannons). The British marched on 19 March 1918 and burned 100 maunds of paddy from the village jhum fields. They climbed to Hiangtam and the Zou began to fire from stockades prepared for the attack. The Zous kept an extremely strong defence and were not in a position to dislodge from the stockade until mortar shels were fired and it was overran. Cosgrave admitted that the battle of Hiangtam was one of the toughest fights during the rebellion. He quoted it as "The defence of Hengtam village was by far the most stubborn and well organised fight I have seen the Manipur Kukis put up." The British planned to harshly punish Hiangtam, but could find nothing to destroy, except for five goats. Ponies were found, which led the British to speculate that Chingkhama Sana Chauba, a Manipuri rebel, was leading the Kukis in an uprising.

After a skirmish during a precarious terrain obstacle, the British managed to inflict casualties on the Kukis. Following this, they reached the village of Khengoi, which sat on a ridge overlooking Kalay. Khengoi was empty, and a tiger skin was stuffed and hung on a trestle. The column encamped in it and burnt the village the next morning. More villages were destroyed, including Changbol, Gnarjal, and Pantha. Following this the column returned to Imphal.

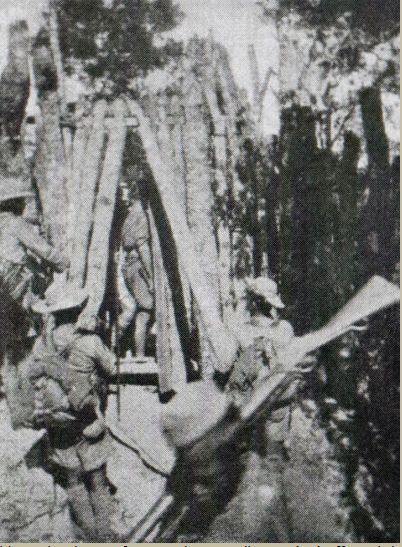
British forces entering the Kamkhong Stockade

By March, the village of Dulin began to show trouble. 150 rifles of the Assam Rifles were sent to cross the Barak River and destroyed Dulin. Several more detachments of the Assam Rifles were dispatched to secure the card road at posts in Kairong and Kanpopki. The rebellion continued to expand and many villages began to become victoms of raids which spread the Assam Rifles thin. More manpower was requested from Sadiya and Kohima to cooperate with the Burmese column against the Chassad under Chief Pache. Pache had destroyed numerous villages in the Chindwin and Manipur valleys. A combined volume of 150 rifles under Captain Coote, with Lieutenant Parry and Higgins, left for the Chassad villages in the hills. Pache's village of Kamjong was destroyed along the way. The columns then fought in Pache's settlement, but he evaded capture and fled into the Somra Tracts.

During the second half of April, the Hinglep, Ukah and Manglung resumed raiding, and this obliged a column of 150 to be sent to them. Lieutenant Tuker was in charge of a detachment near the Burma road where Kukis were active at this time and responding to cut telegraph cables. He destroyed the Aihang and Aimol and returned to Imphal. The change of season in April had made the heat too intense for continuing operations effectively. Parties of Kuki raiders also hovered in the North Cachar Hills, which led to panic among tea estate owners, but no attack was made.

Captain Falkland and Montifiore, who were assigned columns for the Chin Hills, arrived in Haka to relieve it. Following this, the column cooperated with Burmese columns and engaged the Zokhua chiefs at Kapi, Aiton, Shurkwa, Naring and Sakta. Montifiore, on reaching Haka, was sent to revolting villages northeast of the Tao range with lots of opposition at Bawkwa and Bwenlon. In February 1918, he was sent to the stockades at Haika and shot the Gnulbul, Chief of Longya, who was carrying his son in his arms. In April, Montifiore was sent to operate on the Kaladyne River. In June, Falkland returned to Aizawl, and Minotifiore was sent to Rangoon, Calcutta and then Kohima.

A conference was held in Shimla where the Chief Commissioner discussed the need for new logistics and modern equipment. Four mountain guns, a supply of rifle grenades and new rifles were supplied to the Assam Rifles. General Sir Henry Keary was assigned the command in Burma, with Colonel Macquiod assigned to Imphal as commander. The rebel hills were divided into zones, which were to be handled with detachments and lines of outposts. The British struggled to differentiate between friendly and hostile villages, so they set up a concentration camp full of claimed friendly Kukis to repair. A large number applied, but some of these were informants to the rebels. A total of 54 outposts were laid out. The scheme for the areas division set up six areas:

- Jampi area
- Mombi area
- Burma road area
- Chassadh areas
- North Tangkhul area
- North Somra and Tuzu river area

The Jampi chief was captured following Henry Keary's establishment in Burma. In September 1918, Pache approached the Burmese with terms of surrender which were sent to Assam and ultimately rejected. Pache and his men continue to raid and Lieutenant Parry was sent with a detachment to capture him and his men. He successfully ambushed them at Hoondong where a large number of rebels were captured. In October new British officers were transferred to Imphal and 30 of them were divided in the new rebel areas for pacification. Forces from Aizawl and Sadiya reached in November and was placed under Brigadier-General Macquiod. In January 1919, Goodall's column continued to pacify the Hinglep-Manglung area and pursued Chief Ngulkhup of Mombi to Tamu where he surrendered. The Burma column continued to pursue Pache into the Somra area. By spring, the Kukis began to surrender and Pache surrendered in April. Two more chiefs in Jampi were also captured thus ending the active phase of the rebellion. In total, 86 villages were destroyed, 112 surrendered and submitted, and 15 became deserted by the people.

== Aftermath ==
The rebel areas were fined for the rising. Prominent leaders were imprisoned and or deported. The Kuki peoples were made to open up their country by constructing fair bridle paths through the hills. As a result, 740 miles of bridle road were made in 1919–1920. After the rising, fines were imposed for the Kukis amounting to one lakh rupees. The Government disagreed with local officers on the question of punishment following the uprising. Local officers wanted to treat the rebels as murderers and have them executed or deported. The Government, however, treated the Kuki rebels as "enemies in arms" in an act of "barbarous warfare". The Kuki chiefs were tried under Bengal Regulation III of 1818. They were detained outside the state. Nine of the chiefs were detained in Sadiya, Assam. Another thirteen chiefs were detained in Taungyi, Burma. They were released after three years, except Chengjapao, Chief of Aishan, who was released after four years.

The Kukis employed in penal labour lost time recovering from the damages of the conflict. Furthermore, the British abolished the doctrine of indirect rule and the power and influence of the chiefs. The destruction of authority deprived the British Government of legitimacy to rule the hills and sowed discord. The Kukis maintained their staunch spirit of independence after the conflict, and many deposed chiefs joined the Japanese Army and the Indian National Army in World War II against the British.

== Disputes on terminology ==
Several Naga groups of Manipur opposed the term "Anglo Kuki War", holding that the conflict between the British and the Kukis was a "rebellion" as mentioned in British records, rather than a war. They requested the Government of Manipur to stop the commemoration events of the "Anglo-Kuki War".

In October 2019, the Meitei civil society organisation Federation of Haomee sent a memorandum to Union home minister Amit Shah, and claimed that Shah had supported their demands. Subsequently, the Manipur Government ordered the destruction of all the recently erected centenary monuments mentioning "Anglo-Kuki War". In 2020, a monolith that mentioned "Anglo-Kuki War" was forced to change it to "Kuki Rising".

In August 2023, in the midst of unprecedented ethnic violence in the state of Manipur that has seen over 50,000 people displaced, Federation of Haomee has registered two FIRs against authors that have written books mentioning "Anglo-Kuki War". Retired colonel Vijay Chenji, who wrote a book titled The Anglo-Kuki War 1917-1919, JNU academics Jangkhomang Guite and Thongkholal Haokip, who edited a volume titled The Anglo- Kuki War, 1917-1919: A Frontier Uprising against Imperialism during the First World War, were accused under section 120/121/123/153-A/200/120-8 of IPC. The complaint claimed that there was no Anglo-Kuki War in Manipur's history, and the authors had lied.

== See also ==
- Bhumij rebellion
- Indian Rebellion of 1857
- Kol rebellion
- Santhal rebellion

== Sources ==
=== Books ===
- "Plan of Operations against the Kuki rebels: Reports regarding the progress of the operations (Digitized Document)", indianculture.gov.in, National Archives of India, August 1919
- Guite, Jangkhomang; Haokip, Thongkholal, eds. (2019), The Anglo-Kuki War, 1917–1919: A Frontier Uprising against Imperialism during World War I, Routledge, ISBN 978-1-138-50704-3
  - Ningmuanching (2019), "'As Men of One Country': Rethinking the history of the Anglo-Kuki War", in Jangkhomang Guite; Thongkholal Haokip (eds.), The Anglo-Kuki War, 1917–1919: A Frontier Uprising against Imperialism during World War I, Routledge, pp. 168–197, ISBN 978-1-138-50704-3
  - Guite, Jangkhomang (2019). "'Fighting the White Men till the Last Bullet: The General Course of the Anglo-Kuki War". In Jangkhomang Guite; Thongkholal Haokip (eds.). The Anglo-Kuki War, 1917–1919: A Frontier Uprising against Imperialism during World War I. Routledge. pp. 168–197. ISBN 978-1-138-50704-3.
- Guite, Jangkhomang (19–25 February 2011), "Monuments, Memory and Forgetting in Postcolonial North-East India", Economic and Political Weekly, 46 (8): 56–64, JSTOR 41151794
- Ngamjahao Kipgen; Doungul Letkhojam Haokip, eds. (2021), Against the Empire: Polity, Economy and Culture during the Anglo-Kuki War, 1917–1919, Routledge, ISBN 978-1-003-00065-5
  - Hanneng, David (2021), "From Co-operation to Coercion: The Anglo-Kuki War as a response to changing British geopolitics", in Ngamjahao Kipgen; Doungul Letkhojam Haokip (eds.), Against the Empire: Polity, Economy and Culture during the Anglo-Kuki War, 1917–1919, Routledge, pp. 53–70, ISBN 978-1-003-00065-5
  - Zou, S. Thangboi (2021). "The Zou Gal (1917-1919)". In Ngamjahao Kipgen; Doungul Letkhojam Haokip (eds.). Against the Empire: Polity, Economy and Culture during the Anglo-Kuki War, 1917–1919. Routledge. pp. 71–90. ISBN 978-1-003-00065-5.
  - Lunkhopao, Robert (2021), "Empire of Violence: Colonial state-making and frontier violence during the Anglo-Kuki War", in Ngamjahao Kipgen; Doungul Letkhojam Haokip (eds.), Against the Empire: Polity, Economy and Culture during the Anglo-Kuki War, 1917–1919, Routledge, pp. 71–90, ISBN 978-1-003-00065-5
- Shakespear, Colonel L. W. (1929), History of the Assam Rifles, London: Macmillan And Co – via archive.org

=== Journals ===
- Guite, Jangkhomang (2019). "Colonial violence and its 'Small Wars': fighting the Kuki 'guerillas' during the Great War in Northeast India, 1917–1919". Small Wars & Insurgencies. 30 (2): 447–478. doi:10.1080/09592318.2018.1546369.
