= List of populated places in Bishnupur district =

Villages in Bishnupur district of Manipur, India

The Bishnupur district of Manipur state in India is divided into 3 administrative sub-districts called blocks. As per the 2011 Census of India, it has 7 towns and 49 villages. Some of these village administrations have been re-organized since then.

== Blocks ==
Name	Population	Effective literacy rate	Sex ratio	SC population %	ST population %	Census code (2011)
Nambol	61882	80.51%	1008	3.27%	2.0%	01873
Bishnupur	62778	77.43%	997	0.32%	2.25%	01874
Moirang	112739	72.38%	995	17.64%	0.56%	01875

== Towns ==
Name	Type	Block	Population	Effective literacy rate	Sex ratio	SC population %	ST population %	Census code (2011)
Nambol	Municipal Council (major part)	Nambol	17081	83.45%	1030	0.03%	2.24%	801469
Oinam	Nagar Panchayat	Nambol	7161	81.08%	1013	0.01%	2.12%	801470
Bishnupur	Municipal Council	Bishnupur	12167	84.54%	931	0.0%	8.04%	801471
Ningthoukhong	Municipal Council	Bishnupur	13078	77.13%	1039	0.02%	1.19%	801472
Moirang	Municipal Council	Moirang	19893	83.98%	1021	1.31%	0.43%	801473
Kwakta	Nagar Panchayat	Moirang	8579	59.53%	1000	0.0%	0.19%	801474
Kumbi	Nagar Panchayat	Moirang	9546	76.38%	993	0.1%	0.05%	801475

Note: Oinam, Kwakta, and Kumbi were designated as Nagar Panchayats at the time of the 2011 census, but are now designated as Municipal Councils.

== Villages ==
=== Nambol block ===
Name	Population	Effective literacy rate	Sex ratio	SC population %	ST population %	Census code (2011)
Utlou	3355	87.5%	945	0.0%	0.3%	269868
Kakyai Langpok	2518	80.06%	930	0.0%	0.04%	269869
Thiyam	1344	78.97%	976	0.0%	0.0%	269870
Lourembam	1093	81.52%	1032	0.0%	0.0%	269871
Pukhrambam	3716	85.41%	962	0.03%	0.0%	269872
Leimapokpam	8120	74.57%	984	0.0%	1.53%	269873
Ishok	3055	66.33%	1015	0.0%	2.88%	269874
Sadu Koireng	655	59.71%	1053	11.76%	54.2%	269875
Leimaram	2337	82.72%	1015	81.39%	0.81%	269876
Namoikhul (Namoi Khun)	872	86.46%	995	4.59%	0.23%	269877
Irengbam	3384	79.77%	1039	0.0%	0.09%	269878
Yumnam Khunou	1253	84.24%	1002	0.0%	0.0%	269879
Keinou	4935	80.32%	1070	0.0%	2.09%	269880
Ngaikhong Khunou	1003	77.96%	963	0.0%	0.0%	269881

=== Bishnupur block ===
Name	Population	Effective literacy rate	Sex ratio	SC population %	ST population %	Census code (2011)
Tengkhal Khunou	964	74.52%	971	0.0%	0.0%	269882
Ngaikhong Khullen	5256	78.11%	979	0.06%	0.42%	269883
Toubul	4542	75.79%	1006	0.0%	3.74%	269884
Khoijuman Khullen	2951	77.42%	1025	0.0%	2.64%	269885
Khoijuman Khunou	2738	76.2%	981	0.0%	0.0%	269886
Nachou	4313	66.13%	978	0.0%	0.07%	269887
Potsangbam	3721	72.16%	1020	4.65%	0.05%	269888
Ningthoukhong Awang (part)	1168	71.58%	997	0.09%	0.0%	269889
Ningthoukhong Kha (part)	844	77.03%	958	0.0%	0.12%	269890
Thinungei	4027	75.26%	1015	0.0%	0.1%	269891
Phubala	2800	81.01%	1065	0.0%	0.0%	269892
Sunusiphai	1561	85.11%	1012	0.0%	0.0%	269893
Naranseina	2648	72.72%	1028	0.68%	0.04%	269894

=== Moirang block ===
Name	Population	Effective literacy rate	Sex ratio	SC population %	ST population %	Census code (2011)
Khoirentak	0	NA%	NA	NA%	NA%	269895
Thamnapokpi	2201	78.43%	1036	0.0%	0.0%	269896
Ngangkha Lawai	3514	81.69%	994	0.06%	0.4%	269897
Kwakta (part)	10735	65.17%	1008	2.1%	0.03%	269898
Kha Thinungei / Kha Thingungei	10107	76.78%	1006	40.1%	0.25%	269899
Saiton	4660	73.54%	989	0.13%	2.17%	269900
Karang	1859	53.4%	978	54.81%	0.32%	269901
Ithing	1832	50.26%	932	52.4%	0.66%	269902
Thanga	14316	69.65%	961	81.09%	0.44%	269903
Kumbi (part)	490	70.47%	788	1.43%	2.24%	269904
Sagang	4296	56.73%	986	0.26%	0.26%	269905
Wangoo Keirap	431	72.24%	950	0.0%	0.0%	269906
Torbung	2781	72.55%	991	0.25%	0.04%	269907
Ithai	1989	81.24%	929	0.3%	0.35%	269908
Wangoo Ahallup (Wangoo)	9148	76.16%	1014	0.0%	0.0%	269909
Chairen	785	63.62%	972	0.0%	0.0%	269910
Kasom Tampak (Kamson Tampak)	259	78.08%	919	0.0%	99.61%	269911
Tangjeng	1964	73.55%	956	0.0%	0.0%	269912
Champu Khangpok	832	19.68%	913	94.47%	0.48%	269913
Wapokpi	701	77.19%	1026	0.0%	0.0%	269914
Nongmaikhong	989	55.2%	1006	92.11%	0.51%	269915
Khordak	832	66.75%	1080	2.04%	0.6%	269916
