= Reangzaeng Village =

Reangzaeng is a village in Bishnupur district of Manipur state of India.
