= Rajkumar Madhubir =

Manipuri poet and writer

- ꯔꯥꯖꯀꯨꯔ ꯃꯙꯨꯕꯤꯔ / ꯃꯙꯨꯕꯤꯔ ꯅꯤꯡꯊꯦꯝꯆꯥ
- Born: 10 September 1942; Nambol Kabowakching, Manipur, British India
- Died: 5 September 2004 (aged 61); Imphal, Manipur, India
- Occupations: Writer, poet, editor
- Writing career
- Language: Meitei (Manipuri), English
- Notable works: Praloigi Meiriraktagi, Leigee Khudol Amattang, Lambel, The Shadow of Darkness
- Notable awards: Sahitya Akademi Award (1996)

Rajkumar Madhubir (10 September 1942 – 5 September 2004), also known as R.K. Madhubir (Meitei: Madhubir Ningthemchamayum), was an Indian author and poet from of the modern-day Manipuri literature from Manipur. He is well-known for his emotionally charged short stories and English-language poetry. He received the Sahitya Akademi Award for Manipuri literature and is regarded as one of the leading voices in Northeast Indian postcolonial literary expressions.

== Early life ==
On September 10, 1942, Rajkumar Madhubir was born in Nambol Kabowakching, a community in the present-day Bishnupur district, Manipur. Later, he made his home in the city of Imphal in Sagolband Thangjam Leikai.

== Literary career ==
In Manipuri, Madhubir started writing essays, prose, and short stories. Later on, he contributed to the growth of Northeast Indian Literature in English by publishing a number of collections of English poetry.

He published three major poetry collections in English:

- The Shadow of Darkness (1998)
- The H-Hour Patient
- The Time Bomb and Other Poems

In the Manipuri language, his short story collections include:

- Praloigi Meiriraktagi (Awarded the Sahitya Akademi Award, 1996)
- Leigee Khudol Amattang (2003)

== Themes and style ==
=== Apocalyptic Vision ===
Madhubir frequently uses both Christian and Indic eschatological concepts in his poetry to examine apocalyptic and dystopian themes. Concerns about social instability, moral crisis, and environmental degradation are all seen in his work.

== Awards and honours ==
- Sahitya Akademi Award (1996) for Praloigi Meiriraktagi
- Honoured posthumously as a literary legend by Sahitya Akademi (2012)

== Selected works ==
=== Poetry Collections ===
- Lambel
- The Shadow of Darkness (1998)
- The H-Hour Patient
- The Time Bomb and Other Poems

=== Short Story Collections ===
- Praloigi Meiriraktagi
- Leigee Khudol Amattang (2003)

== Death ==
R.K. Madhubir died on 5 September 2004 in Imphal, Manipur.

== See also ==
- List of Sahitya Akademi Award winners for Meitei
