= Thinungei =

- Village
- Thinungei Location in Manipur, India
- Coordinates: 24.55°N 93.76°E
- Country: India
- State: Manipur
- District: Bishnupur

Population
  - Total: 4,027(approx)

Thinungei is a small village situated within the Bishnupur district in the Indian state of Manipur. It is located about 39 km (24 mi) to the south of Imphal.

== Demographics ==
The total geographical area of the village is 1825.14 hectares. Thinungei has a total population of 4,027. Male population with 1999 and female with 2028. There are about 859 houses in Thinungei village. Ningthoukhong and Phubala are the nearest villages.

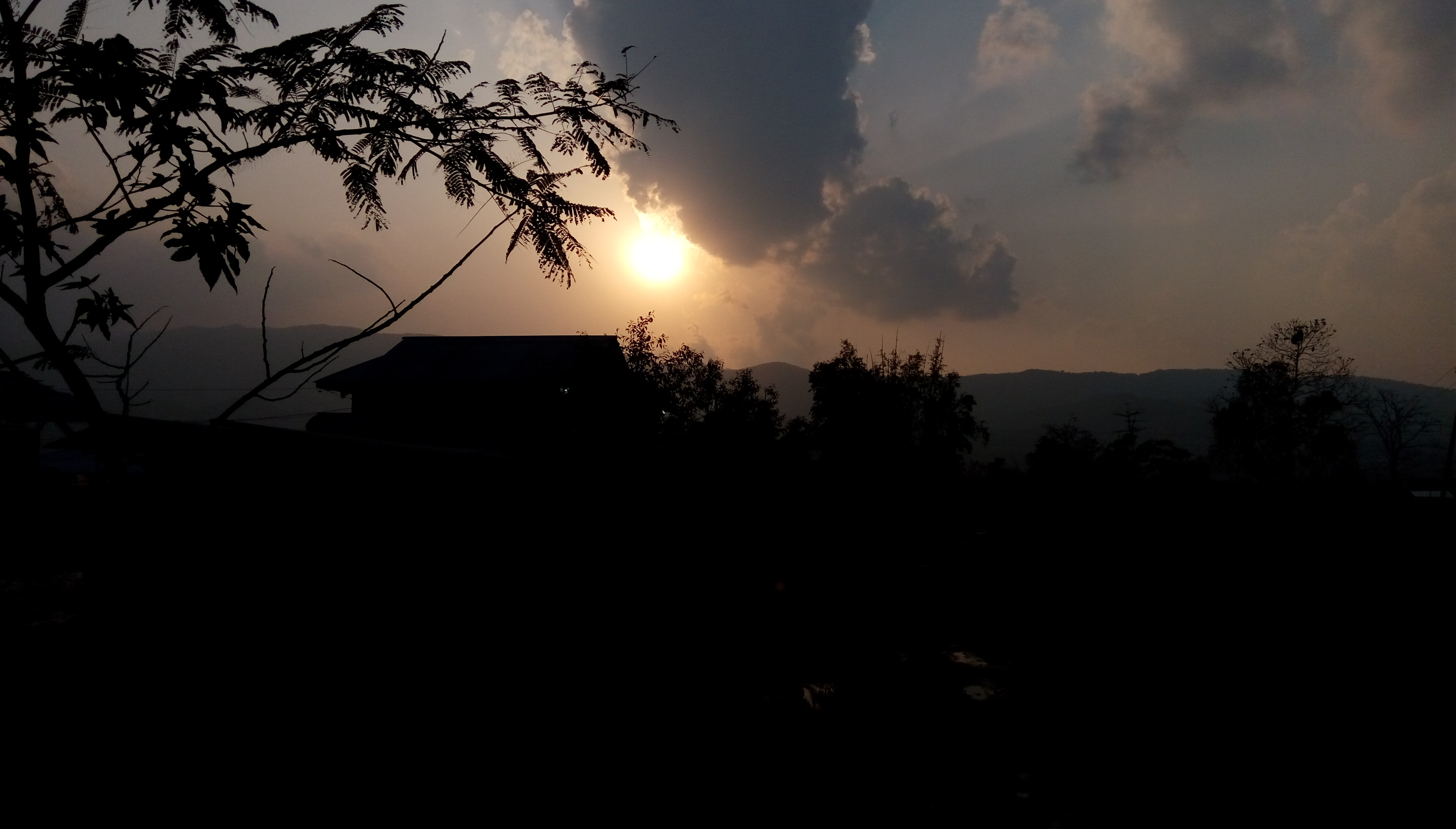

== Tourist spots ==
- Loktak Lake
