= Irengbam =

Irengbam (Meitei: ꯏꯔꯦꯡꯕꯝ) is a Meitei surname or family name.

Notable people with this surname are:

- Irengbam Nalini Devi, Indian politician
- Martin Irengbam, Indian model
