= Oinam =

- Town
- Location in Manipur, India Oinam (India)
- Coordinates: 24.694157°N 93.802879°E
- Country: India
- State: Manipur
- District: Bishnupur

Population (2001)
  - Total: 6,275

Languages
  - Official: [Meeteilon]
- Time zone: UTC+5:30 (IST)
- Vehicle registration: MN
- Website: manipur.gov.in

Oinam is a town in Bishnupur district in the Indian state of Manipur. Oinam is an assembly constituency and part of Inner Manipur Lok Sabha constituency. People belonging to this area sometimes add it to their name as a surname.

== Demographics ==
As of 2001 India census, Oinam had a population of 6275. Males constitute 49% of the population and females 51%. Oinam has an average literacy rate of 62%, higher than the national average of 59.5%: male literacy is 72%, and female literacy is 51%. In Oinam, 13% of the population is under 6 years of age.

== Politics ==
Oinam is part of Inner Manipur (Lok Sabha constituency).
