= Kumbi =

Kumbi kumtambi Meiteilon
- town
- Location in Manipur, India Kumbi (India)
- Coordinates: 24°25′35″N 93°47′52″E
- Country: India
- State: Manipur
- District: Bishnupur

Population (2001)
  - Total: 7,947

Languages
  - Official: Meiteilon (Manipuri)
- Time zone: UTC+5:30 (IST)
- Postal code: 795133
- Vehicle registration: MN
- Website: manipur.gov.in

Kumbi is a town and a Municipality in Bishnupur District in the Indian state of Manipur. The Kumbi Constituency of Manipur Legislative Assembly was named after the village. It is 55 km far away from Imphal, capital city of Manipur.There is one Government Primary Health Centre (PHCs, sometimes referred to as public health centres, are state-owned rural health care facilities).
