= Martin Irengbam =

Indian model

Martin Irengbam is an Indian model. He is native to Imphal, Manipur. He represents India at multiple international fashion shows, held across different countries. He is the winner of Mega Mister North East 2024 from Manipur state. He is also the representative of India at the Mister Top Model of Universe Contest, to be organised in Istanbul, Turkey. He is also the winner of the 13th edition of Set Wet Mega Mister North East. He is also the winner of the "Butterfly Mister Fashion Icon". He is placed among the Top Give of Man Hunt 2023.

== Early life ==
Martin Irengbam (Meitei: ꯃꯥꯔꯇꯤꯟ ꯏꯔꯦꯡꯕꯝ) is born to Hemchandra and Ronibala. He is native to Kakching Khunou Thongam Leikai. Currently, he lives at Kwakeithel Konjeng Awang Leikai in Imphal. He is brought up in a family of an army father and a homemaker mother.

== Education ==
Martin (Meitei: ꯃꯥꯔꯇꯤꯟ) did his schooling from St. Joseph School, Sangaiprou in Imphal West district. He was a Bachelor of Science in Physical Education at Manipur University.

== Career ==
Martin started participating in pageantry from the Manfete Manhunt 2023. Afterwards, he participated in many pageants. He was also the winner of the 13th edition of Set Wet Mega Mister North East.

Upon becoming a representative of his country for the "Top Model of the Universe", he said:

It is truly an honour to be able to represent my country at the Top Model of Universe pageant. I am thankful to Abhijeet Singha sir, and Mega Entertainment for giving me the opportunity and thinking I'm capable. I will try my best to make the team, and my entire country proud.

In the same event, he also achieved the "Butterfly Mister Fashion Icon". In 2023, he was also placed among the Top Give of Man Hunt 2023.
