= Lourembam =

Lourembam is a Meetei surname or family name which has Indian origin.

People of this family mainly inhabit in Manipur, India.

== See also ==
- Oinam (surname)
