= Kwakta =

Kwakta Kwakta Municipal Council Kwakta Bazar
- Kwakta
- Location in Manipur, India Kwakta (India)
- Coordinates: 24.4495°N 93.7304°E
- Country: India
- State: Manipur
- District: Bishnupur

Population (2011)
  - Total: 12,000

Languages
  - Official: Meitei
- Time zone: UTC+5:30 (IST)
- Postal code: 795133
- Vehicle registration: MN
- Website: manipur.gov.in

Kwakta is a town and a Municipal Council in Bishnupur district in the Indian state of Manipur. It is in the Moirang subdivision, between the town of Moirang and the Kuki-dominated villages such as Kangvai and Torbung. It has a population of about 8,000 people, mainly Meitei Pangals (Muslims).

== Demographics ==
As of 2001 India census, Kwakta had a population of 7958. Males constitute 50% of the population and females 50%. Kwakta has an average literacy rate of 63%, higher than the national average of 59.5%: male literacy is 71%, and female literacy is 55%. In Kwakta, 13% of the population is under 6 years of age.

Religion in Kwakta
1. Islam (91.5%)
2. Hinduism (5.66%)
3. Sanamahism (2.36%)
4. Others (0.54%)
