= Nambol =

- Town
- Location in Manipur, India Nambol (India)
- Coordinates: 24.71°N 93.84°E
- Country: India
- State: Manipur
- District: Bishnupur

Population (2011)
  - Total: 22,512

Languages
  - Official: Meiteilon (Manipuri)
- Time zone: UTC+5:30 (IST)
- PIN: 795134
- Vehicle registration: MN

Nambol is a Town and the headquarters of an eponymous subdivision in the Bishnupur district of Manipur, India. It Stretches across one of the major heartline of Highway Known as Tiddim Road.The General functionalities are under administration of Nambol municipal council Most part of Nambol comes under Bishnupur district, While some parts of Nambol belongs to Imphal west District. Nambol as a whole is known to be a Sub- Division. Nambol is one of the educational hubs of Bishnupur district as well as of Manipur. Its market, known as Nambol Bazaar is the second most busiest market, after Khwairamband Bazaar( also known as 'IMA market' ) in Manipur.

== Geography ==
Nambol is located in the midwestern part of oval shaped Imphal valley. The land is level and fertile. River Nambol runs through the center of the town. The town is spread on both sides of the Tiddim Road which is the popular name of the highway, also called NH 150, passing through it. The Nambol tehsil comprises Nambol Awang Leikai, Nambol Makha Leikai, Kongkham, Phoijing, Laitonjam, Leimapokpam, Khathong, Naorem, Sabal Leikai, Mongjing, Khajiri, Utlou, Thangtek, Ishok, Kabowakching, Leimaram, Maibam, Potsangbam, Langpok, Lourembam, Thiyam, Khabi etc.

== Economy ==
Farming, Fishery and Agriculture are the main livelihood of the people of Nambol. Women are mainly engaged in weaving, and other handloom related works. Nambol market is dominantly run by the female group.

== Demographics ==
As of the 2011 Census of India, Nambol had a population of 22,512. Males constitute 50% of the population and females 50%. Nambol has an average literacy rate of 68%, higher than the national average of 59.5%: male literacy is 76%, and female literacy is 59%. In Nambol, 13% of the population is under 6 years of age.

== Festivals ==
The most popular festival is the Lai-Haraoba which is celebrated on top of the Khoriphaba Hill (Which was also world war-II based camp spot for the British Army) and followed by Ibudhou Thanjing Haraoba of Leimapokpam. Other popular Lai Haraoba are Ibudhou Loyalakpa- Kongkham; Chaningleima- Phoijing & Gan-ngai festival is celebrated by Kabui community who are residing at various places among the meiteis.

== Tourism ==
Maibam Lokpa Ching Hill is famous for its part in the Indo-Japanese War, 1944. The Japan War Memorial at Nambol Maibam Lokpa Hill is a hot destination for foreign tourists. Khoriphaba Hill is very famous for its Lai Haraoba festival during the summer season. During this festival many local tourists flock to see the nightlong celebrations. Nambol Bora, a local cuisine is very popular in the State of Manipur, which is available in every nook and corner of this town, the taste is so popular that every local tourist would admire to have a bite available at the very heart of Nambol Bazaar.

== Transportation ==
Nambol is situated just 5 km away from Imphal International Airport (IATA: IMF, ICAO: VEI) which is the second international airport built in the Northeastern region of India, after Guwahati, and which is also the second largest busiest international airport in the north east region after Guwahati. The city is connected to National Highway by "The Tiddim Road". Tiddim Road was where the Japanese 33rd Division (the ‘White Tigers’) faced off with the 17th Indian Division (the ‘Black Cats’), the main British force in the area, during the Battle of Imphal. Homestay is, though knowingly or unknowingly, quite popular for the tourist in this part of Manipur.
