= Hiyang Tannaba =

Indian boat race

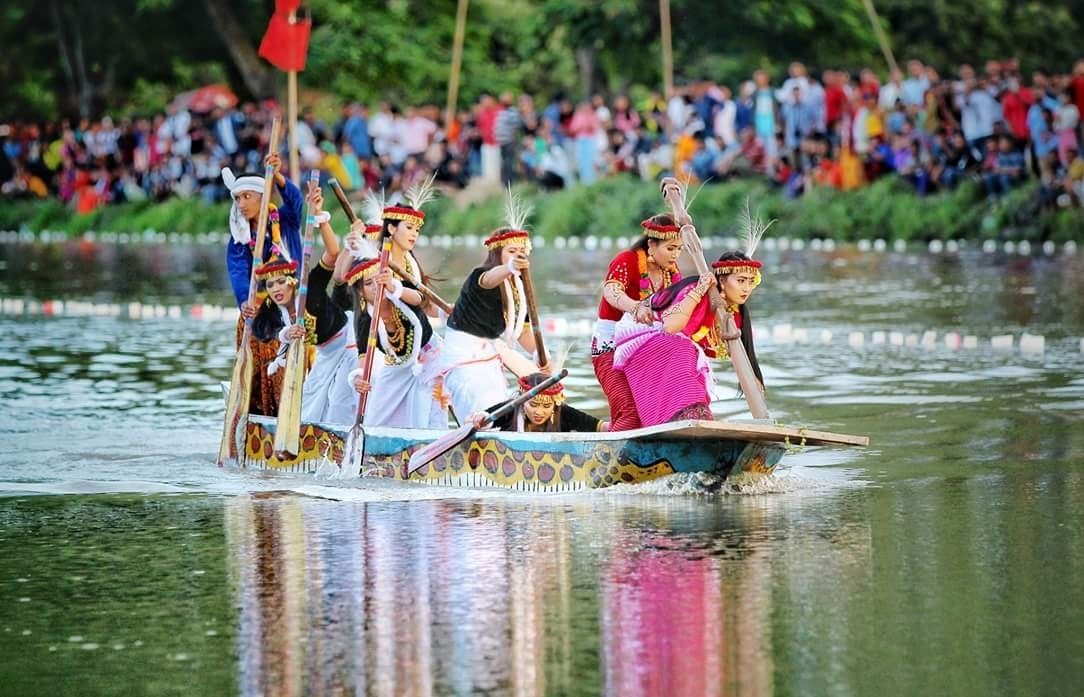

Hiyang Tannaba (Meitei: ꯍꯤꯌꯥꯡ ꯇꯥꯟꯅꯕ, lit. 'boat race') is a traditional boat race ceremony performed in Manipur, India as a part of the religious festival of Lai Haraoba. It is generally organized in the month of November at many places including Thangapat (moat). The boats called Hiyang Hiren are regarded as invested with spiritual powers and the game is associated with religious rites. The Meiteis believe that the worship of the Hiyang Hiren will bring protection from evil spirits.

The Hiyang Tannaba festival has been celebrated since the time of Nongda Lairen Pakhangba (c. 33 AD) in Kangleipak kingdom.

== Gallery ==
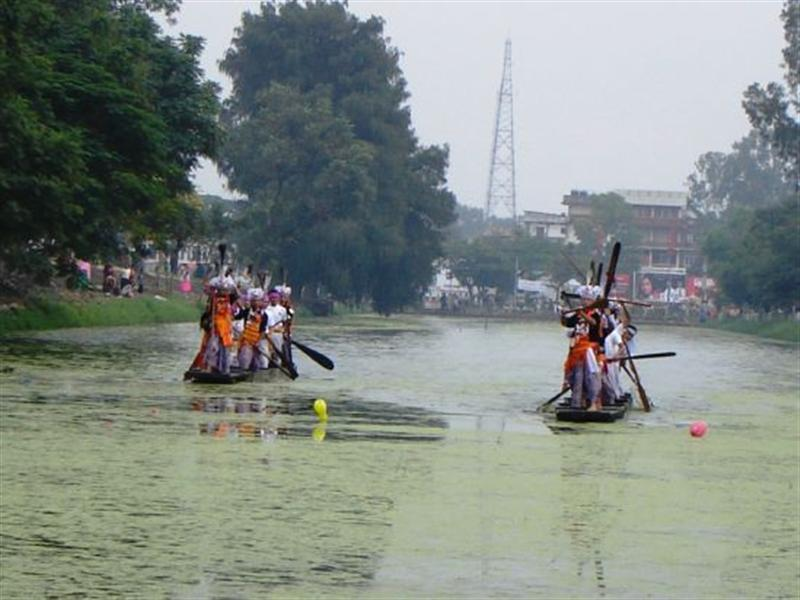

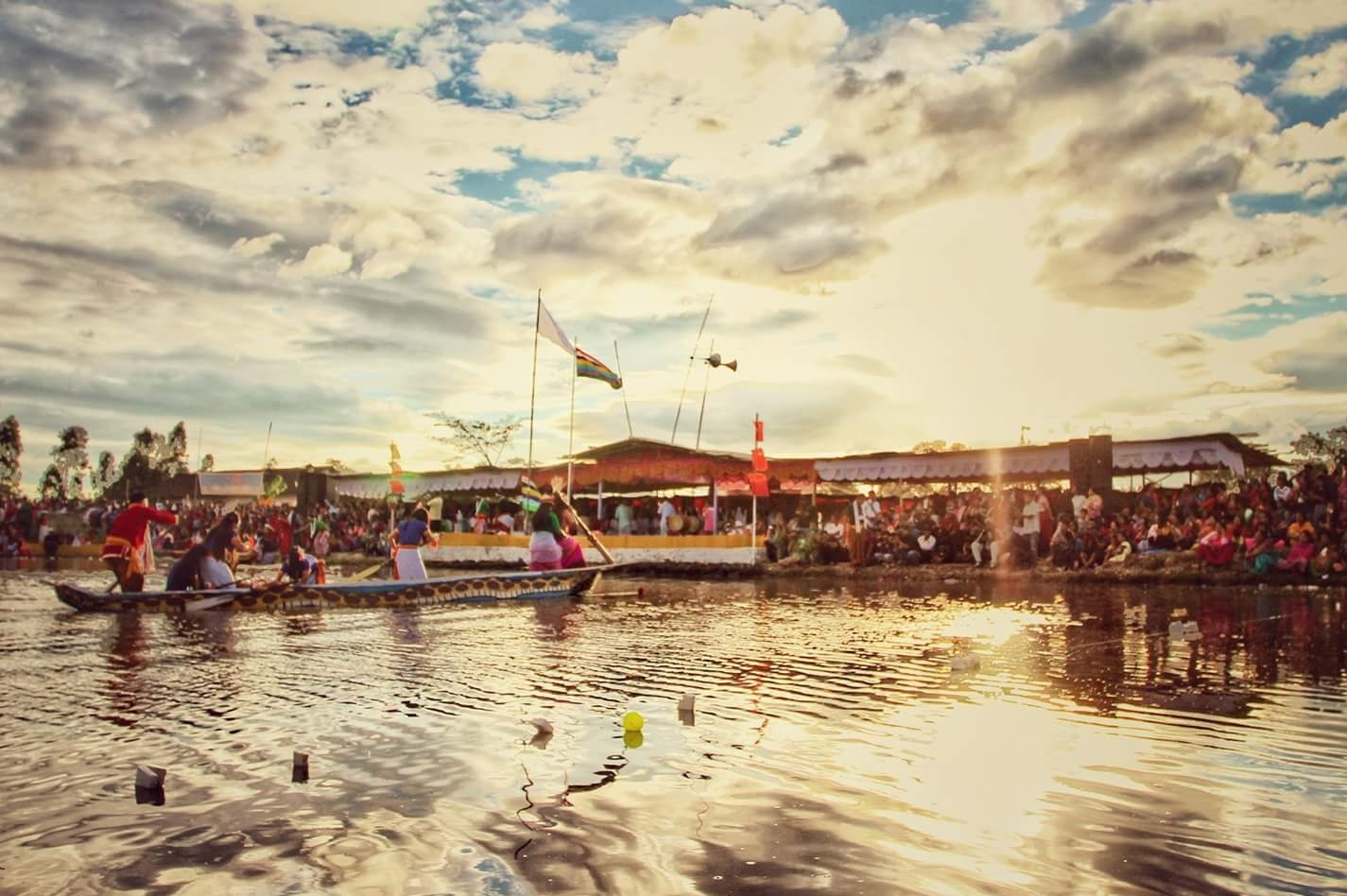

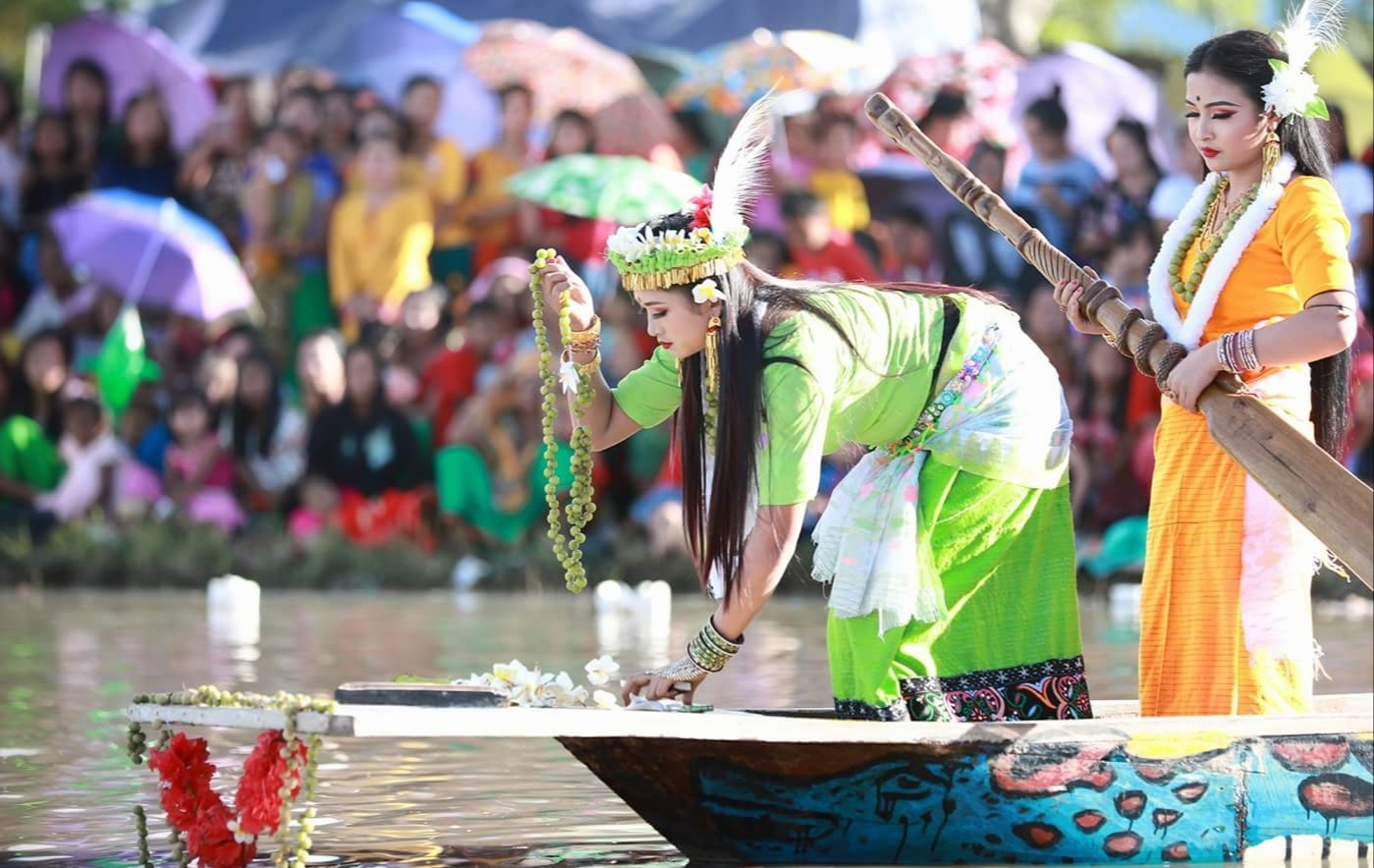

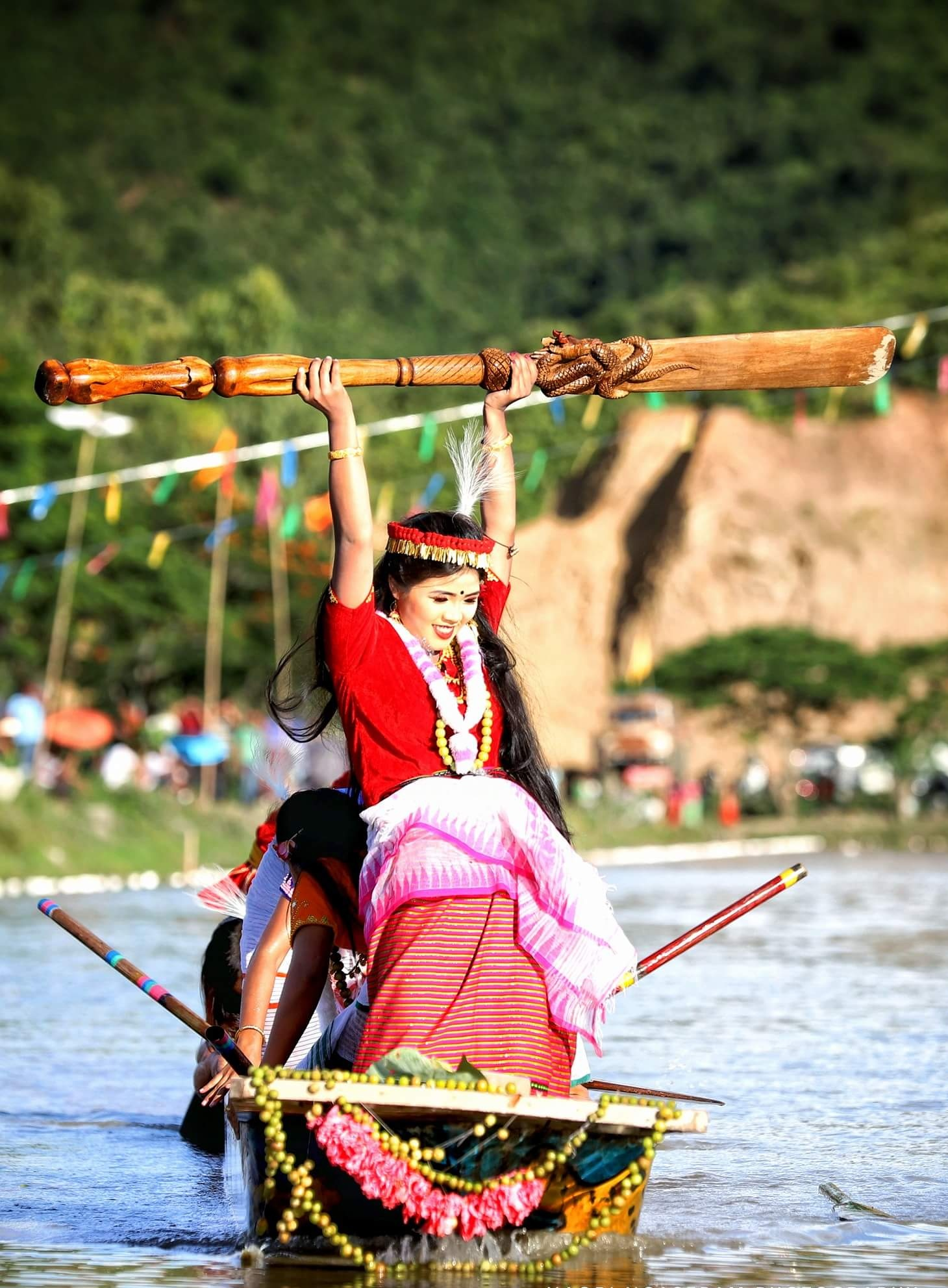

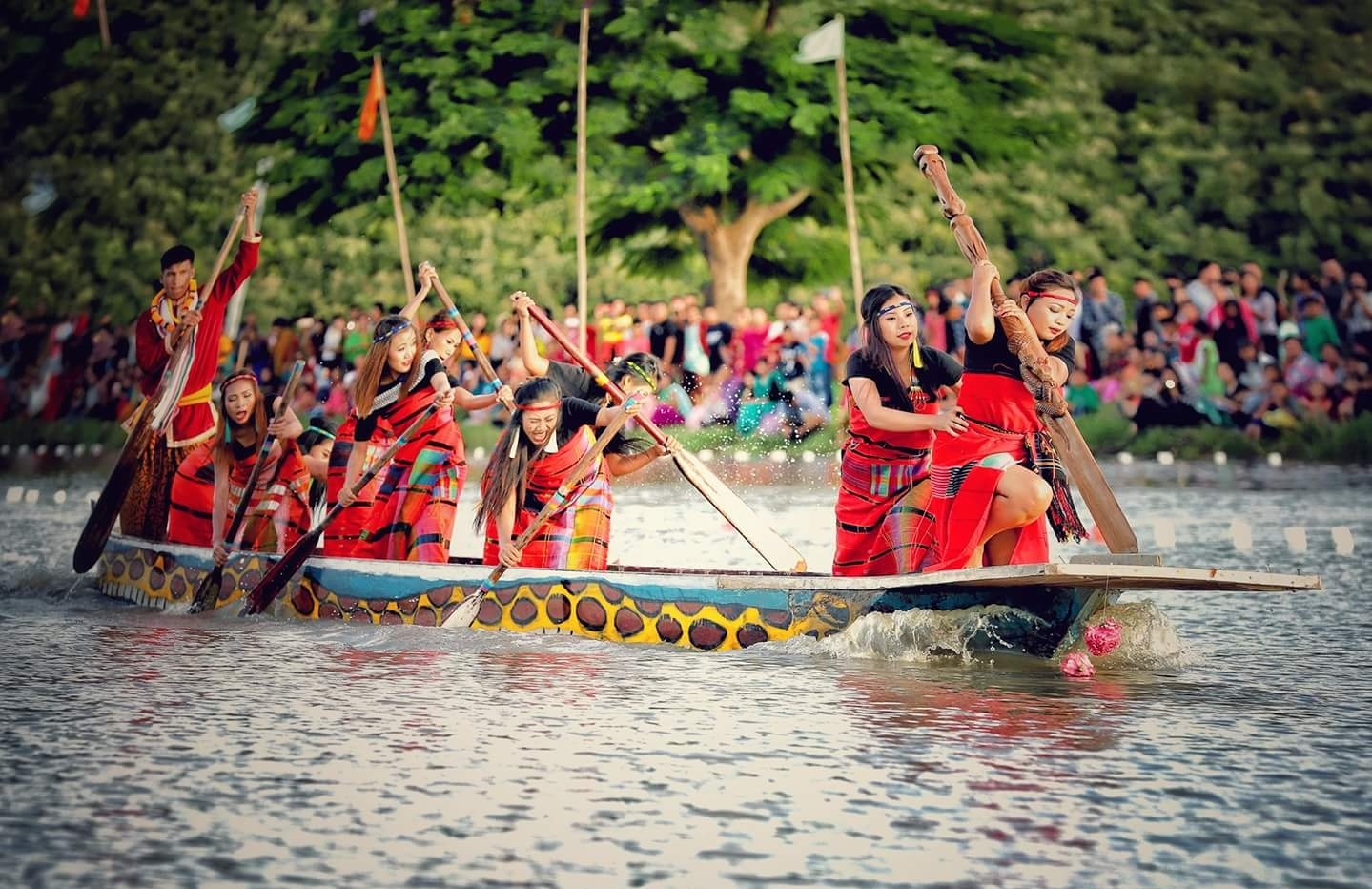

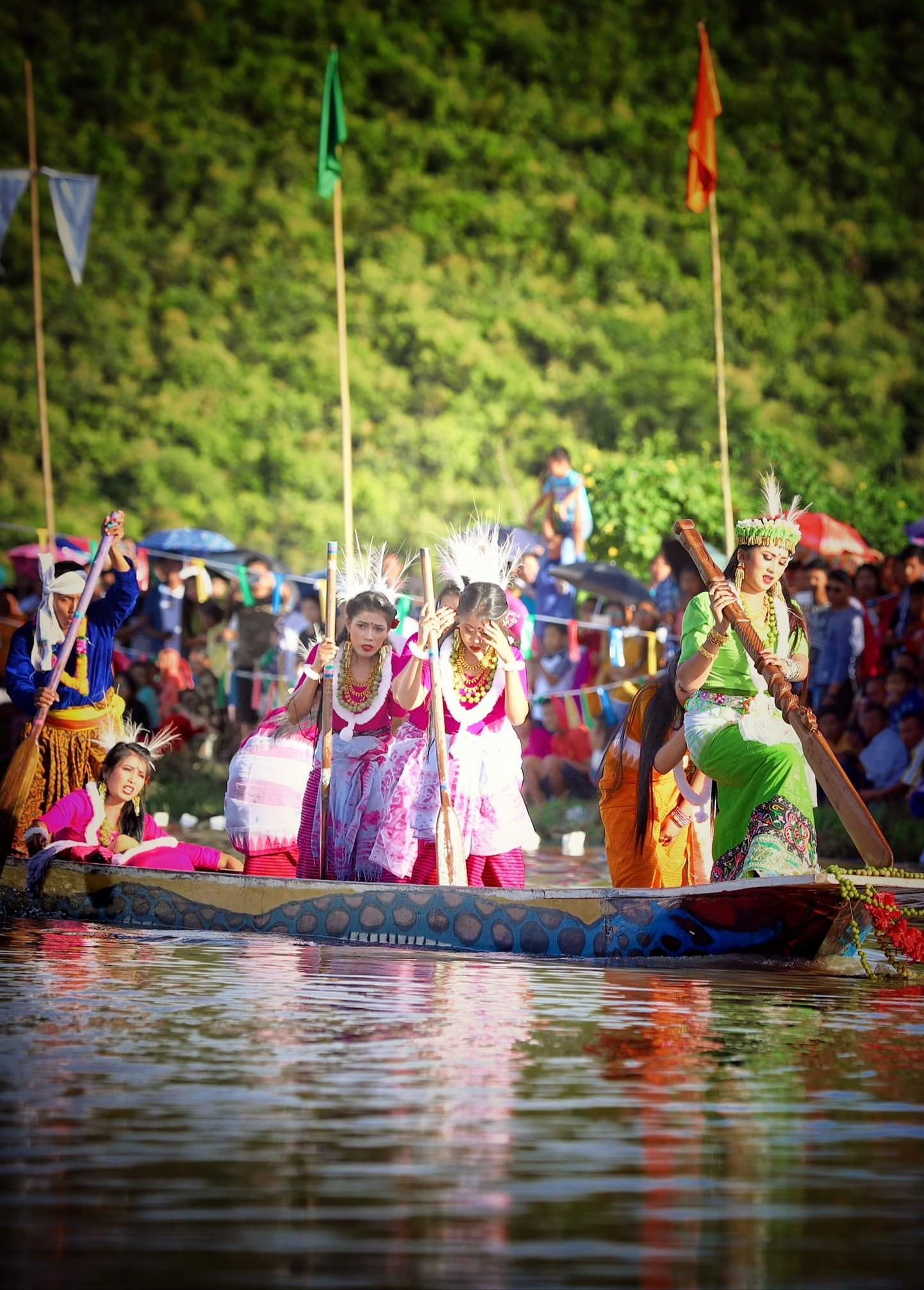
