= Bishnupur, Manipur =

Bishnupur Lamangdong
- Town
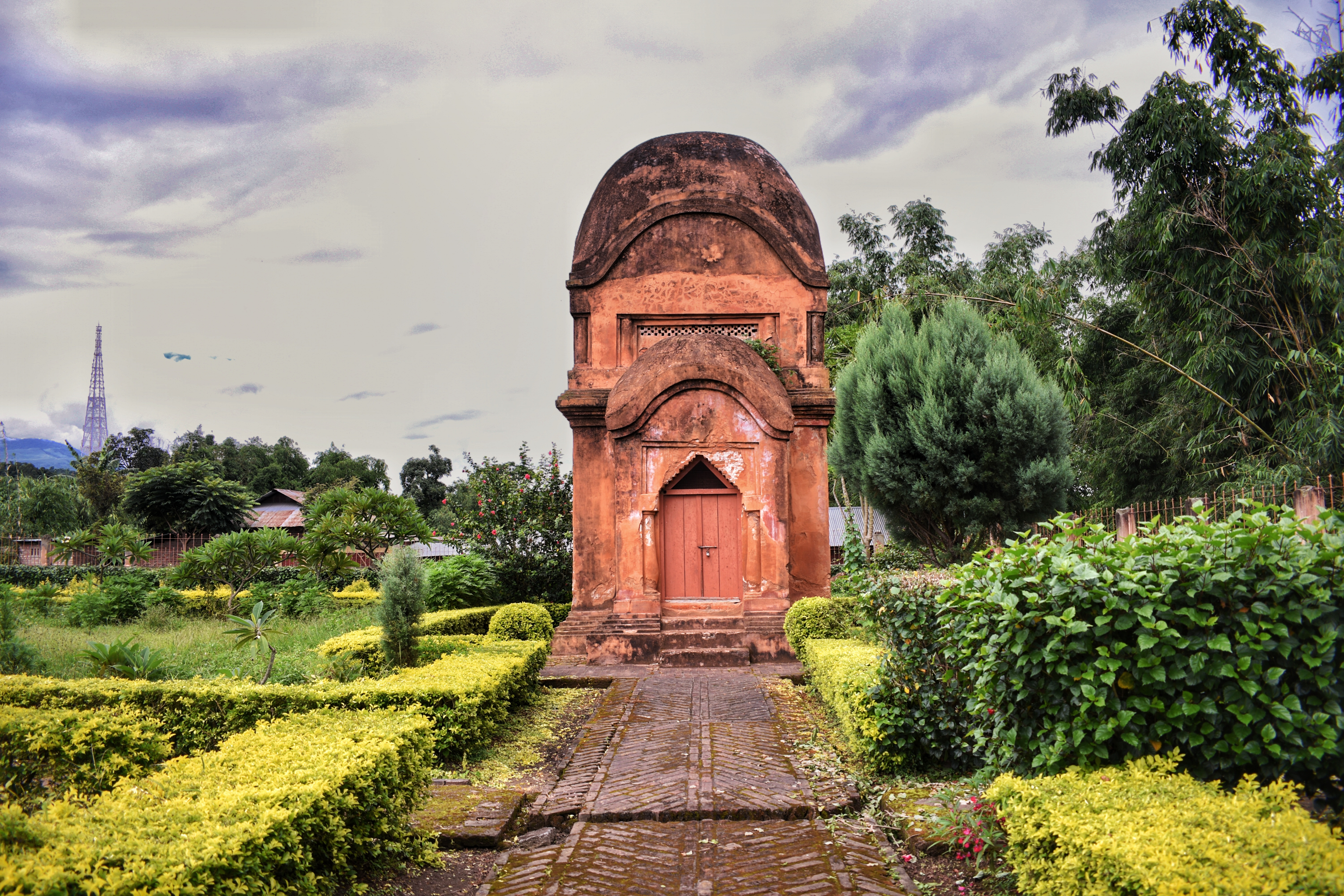
- Vishnu temple after which Bishnupur is named

- Location in Manipur, India Bishnupur (India)
- Coordinates: 24°37′47.011″N 93°45′33.783″E
- Country: India
- State: Manipur
- District: Bishnupur

Population (2001)
  - Total: 16,704

Language(s)
  - Official: Meiteilon (officially called Manipuri)
- Time zone: UTC+5:30 (IST)
- Postal code: 795126
- Vehicle registration: MN
- Website: bishnupur.nic.in

Bishnupur is a town in Bishnupur district in the state of Manipur, India. It derived its name from an ancient Vishnu temple located in the town. There is no official record of when exactly the town was named but it is likely during the reign of Bhagyachandra in the mid 18th century. Bishunupur is the administrative headquarters of Bishnupur District.

In ancient times, Tongjei Maril, lit. 'tubehole') through Bishnupur was the sole road linking Manipur with the rest of India. Bishnupur was one of the sites of the World War II where fierce fightings between the Allied Forces and the Japanese Forces took place. The British war hero, Major-General Orde Wingate, the founder of the Chindits force, died in a plane crash near Bishnupur while flying back from Chindit-held bases in Burma. Many descendants of Japanese armed forces who died here during the War visit Bishnupur to pay homage to their departed ancestors.

== Civic administration ==
Bishnupur is a municipal council. There are 12 wards in Bishunpur Municipal Council.

== Demographics ==
As of the 2011 Census of India, Bishnupur has a population of about 16,264. Males (5,324) constitute 52% of the population and females (4,940) 48%. Bishnupur has an average literacy rate of 82%; with male literacy of 82% and female literacy of 72%. 12% of the population is under 6 years of age. This town is home to Meiteis, Pangals (Manipuri Muslims) and Scheduled Tribes.

== Economy ==
=== Agriculture ===
The main occupation of the people of Bishnupur is agriculture. Rice, potato, cabbage, pulses, brinjal and tomato are the main crops cultivated and produced in the town. All the crops and vegetables grown in the hills and lakes are available in Bishupur.

== Tourist attractions ==
=== Loukoipat ===
Loukoipat is a natural lake located in the Bishnupur district of Manipur, India, situated between two low hills. The site functions as a tourist destination, featuring a panoramic view of the Manipur valley from the slopes of the Loukoipat tourist lodge. The location is undergoing development to include an ecological park.

=== Vishnu Temple ===
Vishnu Temple at Bishnupur is a 15th-century temple dedicated to Lord Vishnu. King Kyamba of Manipur along with Chaopha Khe Khomba, the king of Pong, conquered Kyang, a Shan kingdom in the Kabaw Valley of present Myanmar. Jubilant at the victory, an idol of Lord Vishnu was given by the Pong king to King Kyamba. King Kyamba started worshipping the idol at Lumlangdong which then came to be known as Bishnupur i.e. abode of Vishnu. Subsequently, he built a Vishnu Temple of brick at Bishnupur which has now become a protected historical monument under the Ministry of H.R.D (Archeology), Government of India. It is now standing as a symbol of the remains of ancient times. And the statue got by Kyamba from the Pong king is very important since it gives us the idea of the religious beliefs of those days and the very name that it had given.

During the rule of Kyamba the worship of Vishnu began in Manipur again. A little image of Lord Vishnu was presented by the King of Pong when he concluded a treaty with the king of Manipur in 1470 AD. Kyamba built a brick temple at Bishnupur and installed the image there. In this way the worship of Lord Vishnu began in Manipur again. But "in spite of regular worship of Vishnu Kyamba was not initiated to Vaishnavism by a preceptor."

== Politics ==
Bishnupur is a part of Inner Manipur (Lok Sabha constituency).
