= Bishnupur district, Manipur =

Bishnupur district Bishenpur district
- District of Manipur
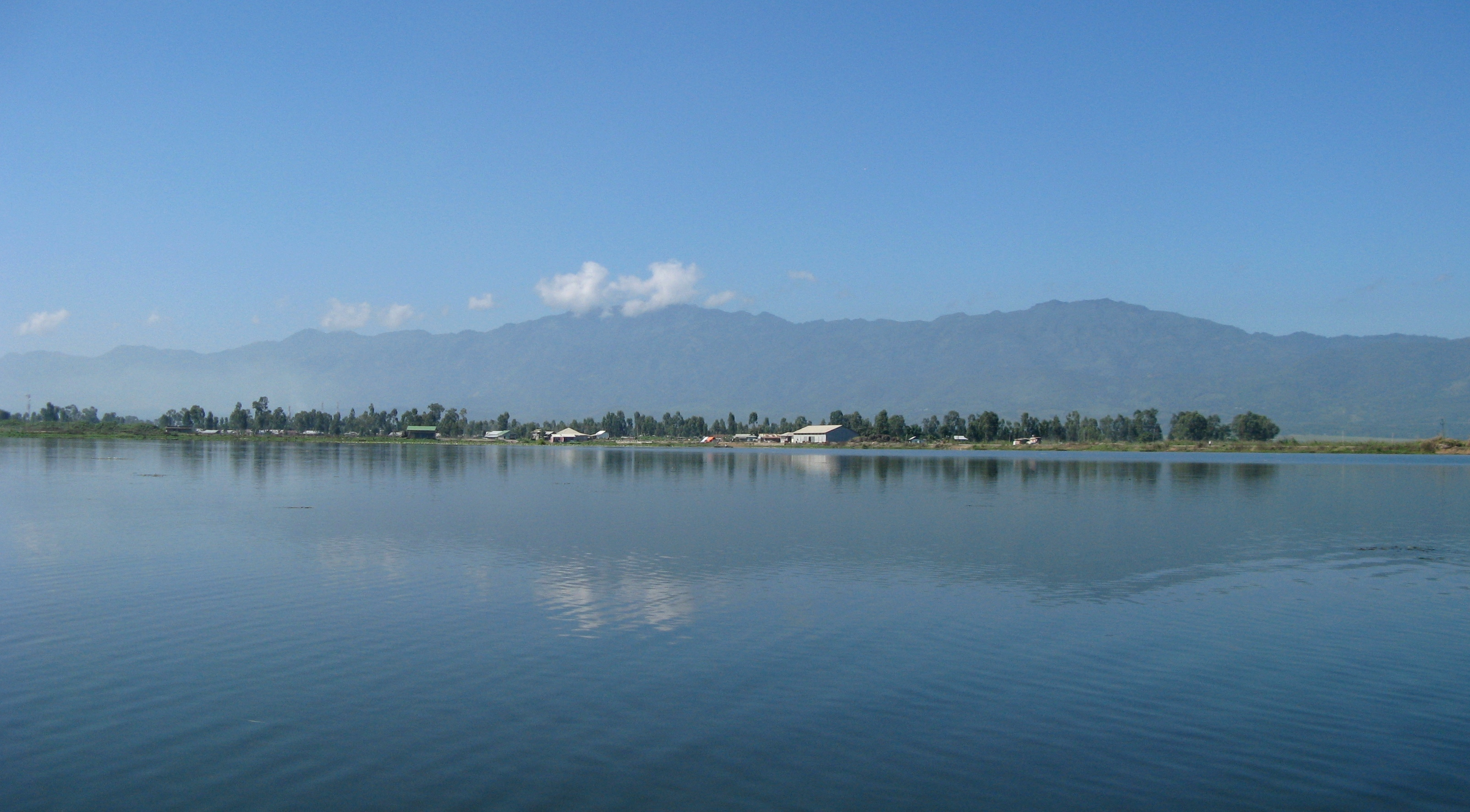
- Loktak Lake

- Location in Manipur
- Coordinates: 24.6329°N 93.7671°E
- Country: India
- State: Manipur
- Headquarters: Bishnupur

Area
  - Total: 530 km^{2} (200 sq mi)
  - Rank: 12

Population (2011)
  - Total: 237,399
  - Density: 450/km^{2} (1,200/sq mi)

Language(s)
  - Official: Meiteilon (officially called Manipuri)
- Time zone: UTC+5:30 (IST)
- ISO 3166 code: IN-MN-BI
- Vehicle registration: MN
- Website: bishnupur.nic.in

Bishnupur district (Meitei pronunciation: /ˌbɪʃnʊˈpʊə/) or Bishenpur district, is a district of Manipur state in northeastern India. The district headquarters is Bishnupur.

== Etymology ==
Its name is derived from a Vishnu temple located at Lamangdong.

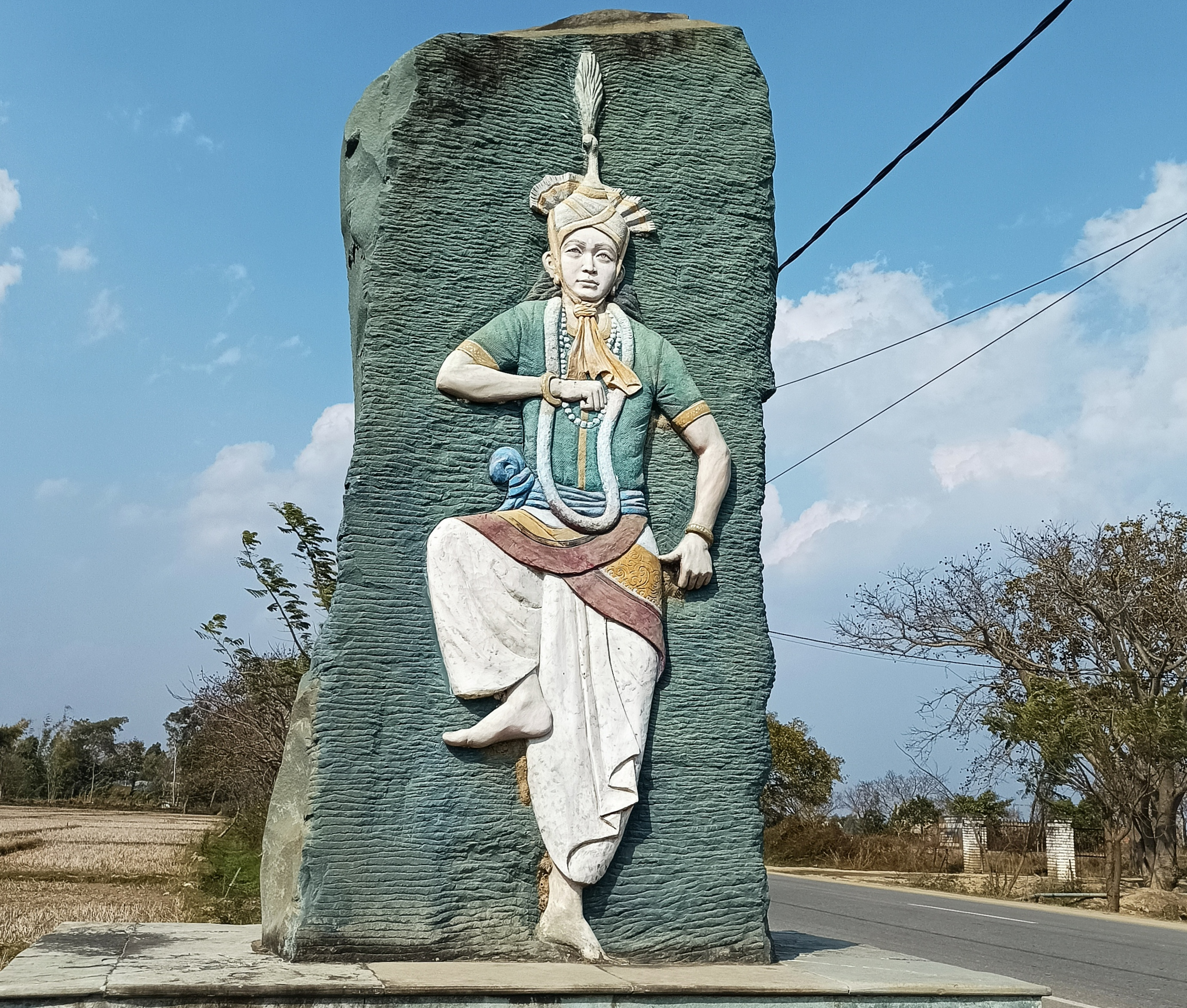
A relief sculpture of Khuman Khamba

== Geography ==
Bishnupur town is the administrative headquarters of the district. Other major towns in this district are: Nambol, Moirang, Ningthoukhong, and Kumbi. Major village in this district are Nachou, Ngaikhong Khullen, Toubul, and Khoijuman Khullen.

== Flora and fauna ==
In 1977 Bishnupur district became home to Keibul Lamjao National Park, which has an area of 40 km^{2} (15.4 mi^{2}).

== Demographics ==
Historical population
Year	Pop.	±%
1951	57,340	—
1961	79,005	+37.8%
1971	108,785	+37.7%
1981	141,760	+30.3%
1991	180,773	+27.5%
2001	208,368	+15.3%
2011	237,399	+13.9%
Source: Census of India

According to the 2011 census, the Bishnupur district has a population of 237,399. This gives it a ranking of 583rd in India (out of a total of 640). The district has a population density of 485 inhabitants per square kilometre (1,260/sq mi). Its population growth rate over the decade 2001-2011 was 15.36%. Bishnupur has a sex ratio of 1000 females for every 1000 males. Its literacy rate is 76.35%. 36.86% of the population lived in urban areas.

Scheduled Castes made up 9.31% of the population, and the Scheduled Tribes 1.38% of the population in 2011. The composition of the scheduled tribes was as follows.

	Population	Percentage of Total Pop.
All Scheduled Tribes	3,287	1.4%
Kuki-Zo tribes (Note: The Kuki-Zo tribes include Gangte, Hmar, Paite, Simte, Sukte, Thadou, Vaiphei, Zou, and some smaller tribes designated as "Any Kuki" and "Any Lushai (Mizo)".) (Note: The low number of Kuki-Zo tribes is deceptive because many tribal villages that might appear to be geographically within the Bishnupur district regard themselves as belonging to the adjoining hill district, e.g., Torbung and Kangvai.)	913	0.4%
Naga tribes (Note: The Naga tribes include Angami, Kabui, Kacha Naga, Mao, Maram, Poumai, Sema and Tangkhul.)	1,578	1.1%
Old Kuki/Naga (Note: The Old Kuki tribes retaining the Kuki classification include: Aimol, Chiru, Kom, Koireng, Kharam, and Ralte. The tribes under the Naga umbrella include: Anal, Chothe, Koirao, Lamkang, Maring, Moyon, Monsang, Purum and Tarao.)	533	0.2%

Religions in Bishnupur district (2011)
Religion	Percent
Hinduism	73.76%
Sanamahi	16.20%
Islam	7.87%
Christianity	1.80%
Other or not stated	0.37%

The primary language spoken is Meiteilon, spoken by 97.87% of the population. Other minority languages spoken includes Rongmei, Nepali, Bengali, Hindi and Thadou.

== Administrative divisions ==
The district is divided into 3 sub-divisions:

- Nambol
- Bishnupur
- Moirang

== Towns ==
- Nambol
- Oinam
- Bishnupur
- Ningthoukhong
- Moirang
- Kwakta
- Kumbi

== See also ==
- List of populated places in Bishnupur district
