= Ningthoukhong =

- city
- Location in Manipur, India Ningthoukhong (India)
- Coordinates: 24.563°N 93.72866°E
- Country: India
- State: Manipur
- District: Bishnupur

Population (2011)
  - Total: 13,078

Languages
  - Official: Meiteilon (Manipuri)
- Time zone: UTC+5:30 (IST)
- Vehicle registration: MN
- Website: manipur.gov.in

Ningthoukhong is a town and a Municipal Council having 14 wards in Bishnupur district in the Indian state of Manipur.

== Demographics ==
As of the 2011 Census of India, Ningthoukhong had a population of 13,078 of which 6,415 are males while 6,663 are females as per report released by Census India 2011. Literacy rate of Ningthoukhong city is 77.13 % higher than state average of 76.94 %. In Ningthoukhong, Male literacy is around 86.46 % while female literacy rate is 68.32 %. In Ningthoukhong, 12.56 % of the population is under 6 years of age. It's the place from where water for NHPC project is sourced through a canal. Per capita income for ningthoukhong is among the highest one in the state. It is situated at a distance of about 30 km from Imphal along Tiddim Road. Ningthoukhong is a municipality and an important commercial center.

== History ==
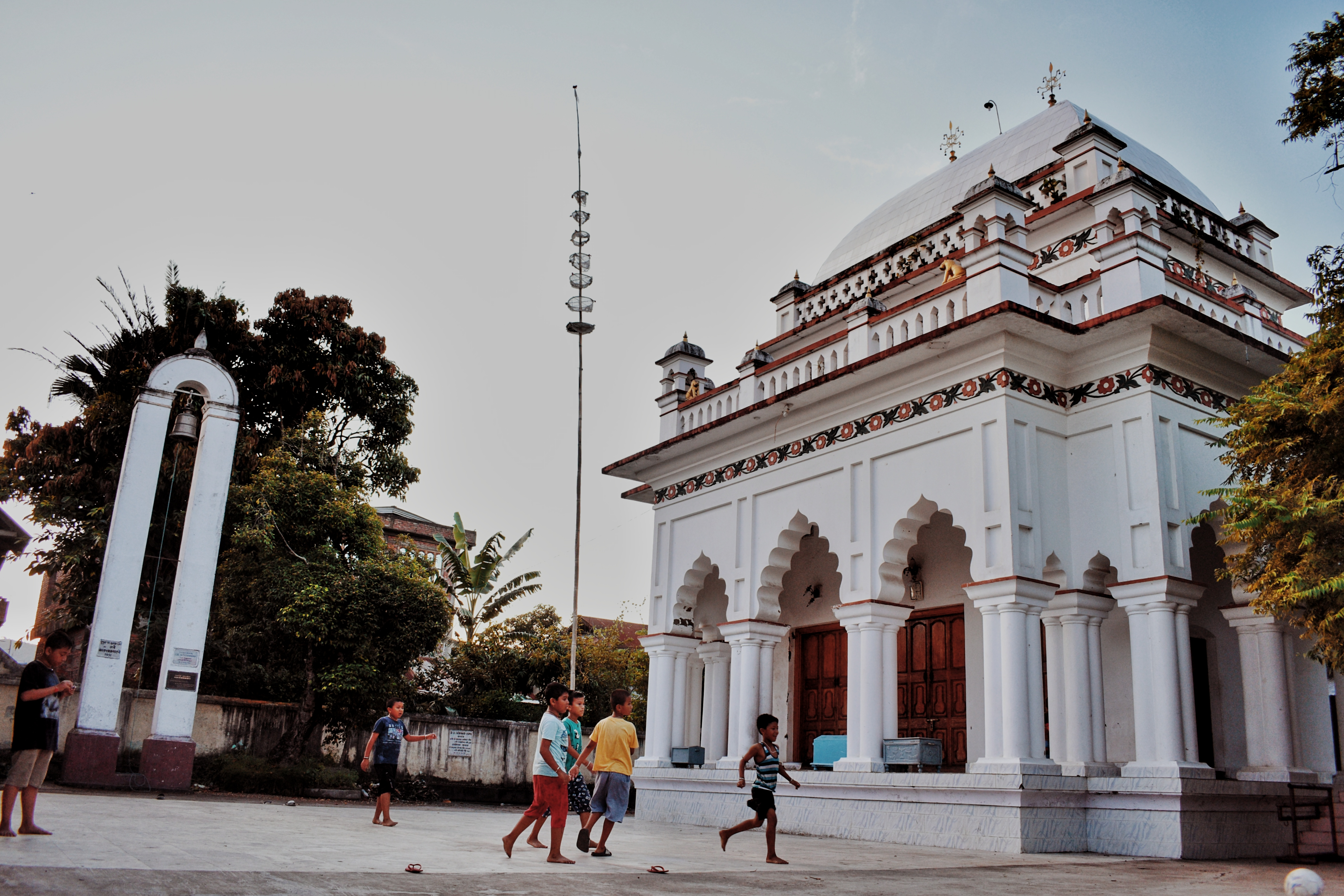
Gopinath Temple in Ningthoukhong

Ningthoukhong is also famous for the local deities of the Meitei. Some of the examples are Ibudhou Oknarel, Ibudhou Thangnarel and Ibudhou Panganba. The temples of these three deities are still present today. One of the most important Macha Ebemma temple is situated at Shantipur(Ningthoukhong).The people of Ningthoukhong worship Ima Loktak Lairembi, the goddess of Loktak Lake for prosperous land every year. The Hindu temples such Ningthoukhong Gopinath Mandir and Radha Mandhav are also located in this town.

During the Second World War, Ningthoukhong was a central point of fighting between the British, located in Maibam Lokpa Ching of Bishnupur (Northern direction) and the approaching Indian National Army (INA), and Japanese soldiers from Moirang (Southern direction). On the night of 6th-7th June, 1944, an attack was made by the Japanese. The attack largely fell on a British Army position held by a platoon of which Serjeant Turner of the West Yorkshire Regiment was a Section Commander. The Japanese soldiers used hand grenades with deadly effect, destroying three machine-gun positions in the platoon, who were forced to give ground. Serjeant Turner armed with grenades, boldly and fearlessly attacked the Japanese single handed. He went back five times for more grenades; and on the sixth occasion, still singlehanded, he was killed while throwing a grenade. Serjeant Turner, of Halifax, England, was awarded a Victoria Cross for his bravery. He is buried in the Imphal War Cemetery, Plot 6. Row B. Grave 7.

The town was completely destroyed during the war between these two forces. After the Second World War the native people returned to rebuild and inhabit the town.
