= 2022 in India =

- Centuries: 19th; 20th; 21st
- Decades: 2000s; 2010s; 2020s
- See also: List of years in India; Timeline of Indian history

The following is a list of events for the year 2022 in India.

== Incumbents ==
=== National government ===
Photo	Post	Name
	President of India	Ram Nath Kovind (till 25 July 2022) Droupadi Murmu (from 25 July 2022)
	Vice-President of India and Chairman of Rajya Sabha	Venkaiah Naidu (till 11 August 2022) Jagdeep Dhankhar (from 11 August 2022)
	Prime Minister of India	Narendra Modi
	Speaker of the Lok Sabha	Om Birla
	Chief Justice of India	N. V. Ramana (till 28 August 2022)
	Chief Justice of India	Uday Umesh Lalit (28 August 2022 - 8 November 2022)
	Chief Justice of India	Dhananjaya Y. Chandrachud (From 8 November 2022)
	Governor of Reserve Bank of India	Shaktikanta Das
	Chief Election Commissioner of India	Rajiv Kumar
	Chief of Defence Staff	Anil Chauhan
	Lok Sabha	17th Lok Sabha

=== State governments ===
State	Governor	Chief Minister	Party	Political Alliance	Chief Justice
Andhra Pradesh	Biswabhusan Harichandan	Y. S. Jagan Mohan Reddy	YSRCP	Regional	Prashant Kumar Mishra
Arunachal Pradesh	B. D. Mishra	Pema Khandu	BJP	N.D.A.	Sudhanshu Dhulia (Gauhati High Court)
Assam	Jagdish Mukhi	Himanta Biswa Sarma	BJP	N.D.A.	Sudhanshu Dhulia (Gauhati High Court)
Bihar	Phagu Chauhan	Nitish Kumar	JD(U)	U.P.A.	Sanjay Karol (Patna High Court)
Chhattisgarh	Anusuiya Uikey	Bhupesh Baghel	INC	U.P.A.	P. R. Ramachandra Menon
Goa	P. S. Sreedharan Pillai	Pramod Sawant	BJP	N.D.A.	Dipankar Datta
Gujarat	Acharya Dev Vrat	Bhupendra Patel	BJP	N.D.A.	Vikram Nath
Haryana	Bandaru Dattatreya	Manohar Lal Khattar	BJP	N.D.A.	Ravi Shankar Jha
Himachal Pradesh	Rajendra Arlekar	Sukhvinder Singh Sukhu	INC	N.D.A.	L. Narayana Swamy
Jharkhand	Ramesh Bais	Hemant Soren	JMM	U.P.A.	Ravi Ranjan
Karnataka	Thawar Chand Gehlot	Basavaraj Bommai	BJP	N.D.A.	Ritu Raj Awasthi
Kerala	Arif Mohammad Khan	Pinarayi Vijayan	CPI(M)	Regional	S. Manikumar
Madhya Pradesh	Mangubhai Patel	Shivraj Singh Chouhan	BJP	N.D.A.	Ravi Malimath
Maharashtra	Bhagat Singh Koshyari	Eknath Shinde	Shiv Sena	N.D.A.	Dipankar Datta
Manipur	La. Ganesan	N. Biren Singh	BJP	N.D.A.	Ramalingam Sudhakar
Meghalaya	Ganga Prasad	Conrad Sangma	NPP	N.D.A.	Biswanath Somadder
Mizoram	Nirbhay Sharma	Zoramthanga	MNF	Regional	Sudhanshu Dhulia
Nagaland	Jagdish Mukhi	Neiphiu Rio	NDPP	N.D.A.	Sudhanshu Dhulia
Odisha	Ganeshi Lal	Naveen Patnaik	BJD	Regional	S. Muralidhar
Punjab	Banwarilal Purohit	Bhagwant Mann	AAP	Regional	Ravi Shankar Jha
Rajasthan	Kalraj Mishra	Ashok Gehlot	INC	U.P.A.	Manindra Mohan Shrivastava
Sikkim	Shriniwas Patil	Prem Singh Tamang	SKM	N.D.A.	Jitendra Kumar Maheshwari
Tamil Nadu	R. N. Ravi	M. K. Stalin	DMK	U.P.A.	Munishwar Nath Bhandari
Telangana	Tamilisai Soundararajan	K. Chandrashekar Rao	TRS	Regional	Satish Chandra Sharma
Tripura	Ramesh Bais	Manik Saha	BJP	N.D.A.	Akil Kureshi
Uttar Pradesh	Anandiben Patel	Yogi Adityanath	BJP	N.D.A.	Rajesh Bindal
Uttarakhand	Gurmit Singh (general)	Pushkar Singh Dhami	BJP	N.D.A.	Raghvendra Singh Chauhan
West Bengal	C. V. Ananda Bose	Mamata Banerjee	AITC	Regional	Prakash Shrivastava

== Events ==
=== January ===
- 1 Jan – Vaishno Devi Temple stampede, Around 2:15 AM in near the Gate No. 3 of Vaishno Devi Temple, due to a scuffle between two groups of pilgrims the place becomes congested and people started suffocating. Due to the melee, 12 people were crushed to death and 16 others injured.
- 4 Jan –
  - Chief ministers of Delhi, Arvind Kejriwal tested positive for SARS-CoV-2. Netizens trolled him on Social Media as he is not wearing mask in his political rallies in Chandigarh and Patiala.
  - Vishal Kumar Jha (in Bengaluru) and Shweta Singh (in Uttarakhand) are arrested by the Mumbai Police, in connection with the Bulli Bai app, which targeted women of Muslim Community by putting their doctored images in an online auction.
- 5 Jan – Prime Minister of India Narendra Modi's convoy stuck in a flyover in Firozpur district following security breach and protests by farmers.
- 6 Jan – Delhi Police arrests a 21 year old Engineering graduate named Neeraj Bishnoi from Jorhat, Assam. He is alleged as the master mind behind creation of an online application called "Bulli Bai" where Muslim women were kept for auction.
- 8 Jan – The Election Commission of India announces the dates for 2022 Legislative Assembly Elections for 5 states. In Uttar Pradesh it will begin on '10 February', in the states of Uttarakhand, Goa and Punjab it will start on 14 February and in Manipur the polling starts 27 February.
- 13 Jan – Maynaguri train accident - A train derailed between New Maynaguri Railway Station and New Domohani Railway Station due to some glitch in locomotive engine, around 5:00 PM in Jalpaiguri district in West Bengal. At least nine people are killed.
- Tableau's of non Bharatiya Janata Party ruling states like Kerala, Tamil Nadu, West Bengal and Odisha gets rejected by Ministry of Defence from taking part in Republic Day parade sparking controversy.
- 21 Jan – Amar Jawan Jyoti which was continuously burning since last fifty years at India Gate in commemoration of Indo-Pakistani War of 1971 was mergered with the eternal flame at the National War Memorial as part of ongoing Central Vista Redevelopment Project. On 21 January 2022, the older flame was merged with the newer one at National War Memorial.

=== February ===
- 7 February - Central Bureau of Investigation booked a case against ABG Shipyard, a Gujarat based company for carrying out the biggest loan frauds in history of the country. The company defrauded nearly 28 banks for loans that's worth more than 22,000 crores.
- 8 February - A special court in Ahmedabad convicts 49 people and acquits 28 people in the 2008 Ahmedabad bombings.
- 14 February - 2022 Karnataka hijab row The high court's interim order was implemented in all schools and colleges across Karnataka, with students, and in some cases teachers, being asked to remove hijabs and burqas outside the school gates.
- 18 February - A special court in Ahmedabad sentences 38 people to death and 11 people to life imprisonment over their role in the 2008 Ahmedabad bombings.
- 4–20 February - India at the 2022 Winter Olympics, Arif Khan was the flag bearer in the opening ceremony.

=== March ===
- 6 March - 2022 Srinagar bombing
- 9 March - India accidentally fired a BrahMos missile originating from Sirsa, Haryana that crashed into Mian Channu, Khanewal District, Punjab, Pakistan. - India–Pakistan missile incident
- 10 March - The legislative assembly elections held in five states - BJP won by beating the incumbency in Uttar Pradesh, Uttarakhand, Goa, Manipur. Where as in Punjab AAP registered a decisive victory over ruling Indian National Congress.
- 11 March - Movie based on Persecution of Hindus in Kashmir Valley - The Kashmir Files released, declared tax free by several state governments.
- 15 March - The Karnataka High Court upheld the Ban on hijabs in schools in the state of Karnataka (following the 2022 Karnataka hijab row) stating that the hijab is not an essential religious practice.
- 21 March - Eight people burned to death in Birbhum district, West Bengal following the murder of a Trinamool Congress politician.

=== April ===
- 10 April
  - Trikut cable car accident
  - April 2022 Indian communal violence
- 20 April - Assam Police arrests Jignesh Mevani a Member of the Legislative Assembly from Gujarat at Banaskantha district following Defamatory Tweet posted by him against Narendra Modi.
- 27 April - Nearly eleven people died of high voltage electrocution at Kallimedu, Thanjavur district when a temple chariot came in contact with Overhead power line.

=== May ===
- 13 May - 2022 Delhi fire
- 16 May - Kapil Sibal quits Indian National Congress following differences that he and other G -23 members had with party leadership.
- 19 May - Nikhat Zareen won the gold medal in the 52 kg category at the 2022 IBA Women's World Boxing Championships defeating Thailand's Jitpong Jutamas in the flyweight final in Istanbul, Turkey. She became the fifth Indian women's boxer to win a gold medal at the World Championships, joining Mary Kom, Laishram Sarita Devi, Jenny R. L., and Lekha K. C.
- 25 May - 2022 Assam floods.
- 27 May - 2022 Muhammad remarks controversy
- 28 May - 2022 Hyderabad gang rape
- 29 May - Popular Punjabi Singer Sidhu Moosewala shot dead in Jawaharke, Punjab.

=== June ===
- 4 June - Hapur chemical plant explosion
- 10 June - Chairman of Ceylon Electricity Board made revelations that Prime Minister of India Narendra Modi pressurized Sri Lanka for handing over a 500 MW Wind power project in Mannar District to Adani Green Energy.
- 13 June - Enforcement Directorate summons and questioned Rahul Gandhi on National Herald corruption case. Protests by Indian National Congress in Delhi around 400 workers detained.
- 14 June - India's first private train under the Bharat Gaurav scheme is launched at Southern Railway zone between Coimbatore and Shirdi. This train is operated by South Star Rail based in Tamil Nadu.
- 16 June - Protests across the country against Agnipath Scheme announced by Government of India.
- 21 June -
  - Maharashtra in political crisis with rebel MLA's under leadership of Eknath Shinde challenged to leave the Maha Vikas Aghadi.
  - Yashwant Sinha announced as presidential candidate by opposition parties.
  - Murder of Umesh Kohle
- 24 June - Supreme Court of India rejects plea filed by Ehsan Jafri's wife against Special Investigation Team report which acquitted Narendra Modi and 63 others in Gulbarg Society massacre.
- 25 June - Former Indian Police Service officer R. B. Sreekumar and social activist Teesta Setalvad arrested by Gujarat Police in connection with 2002 Gujarat riots.
- 27 June - Alt News founder Mohammed Zubair arrested by Delhi Police for a post made by him on Twitter in 2018 which allegedly hurts religious sentiments. The arrest was following a complaint made by an anonymous Twitter user named Hanuman Bhakth.
- 28 June
  - 2022 Mumbai building collapse
  - Kanhaiya Lal is beheaded by Muslims in Udaipur, Rajasthan, for supporting Nupur Sharma in the controversy about Sharma's remarks about Muhammad on social media.
- 2022 Assam floods
- 30 June
  - 2022 Manipur landslide
  - Neeraj Chopra breaks his own national record with 89.94m throw at Stockholm Diamond League
  - Uddhav Thackeray resigns as Chief minister of Maharashtra following Supreme Court of India not admitting the stay petition of Shiv Sena against the Motion of no confidence.

=== July ===
- 5 July - The Bharatiya Janata Party led coalition under the leadership of Eknath Shinde (Shiv Sena defected faction) won the floor test with the support of 164 Members of the Legislative Assembly.
- 13 July - Controversy erupts around a booklet issued by Parliamentary Secretariat that list even commonly used words as Unparliamentary language.
- 23 July - Senior TMC leader and minister in Government of West Bengal, Partha Chatterjee and his aide Arpita Mukherjee were arrested by ED from Kolkata in the SSC Scam.
- 25 July -
  - Droupadi Murmu is sworn in as the 15th President of India
  - Nearly 42 killed in Botad district of Gujarat by consuming illicit liquor.

=== August ===
- 9 August - Nitish Kumar resigns as Chief minister of Bihar following Janata Dal (United) leaving the Bharatiya Janata Party led National Democratic Alliance.
- 10 August - Nitish Kumar sworn in as Chief minister of Bihar with the support of Rashtriya Janata Dal and Indian National Congress.
- 11 August - Jagdeep Dhankhar, former governor of West Bengal and politician from Rajasthan sworn in as 14th Vice President of India.
- 13 August - A nine year old Dalit boy from Jalore district who was beaten by upper caste teacher on 20 July, for drinking water from earthen pots reserved for higher castes succumbs to death.
- 22 August - R Praggnanandhaa, a seventeen year chess player from Tamil Nadu beats world champion Magnus Carlsen on three straight games at FTX Crypto Cup 2022, held at Miami.
- 25 August - FIR and arrest of Shivamurthy Murugha Sharanaru, of Murugha Mutt on alleged continuous sexual assault on two minor girls.
- 26 August - Ghulam Nabi Azad quits from Indian National Congress after his five decade long association with the party.
- 27 August - Uday Umesh Lalit took oath as the 49th Chief Justice of India.
- 28 August - Noida Supertech Twin Towers demolished, being India's biggest building demolition.
- 29 August - 17 year old girl set on fire and succumbed death, by a youth due to turning down his proposal in Jharkhand's Dumka.
- 31 August - Death of Paolo Maino due to prolonged illness, mother of Sonia Gandhi in Italy.

=== September ===
- 1 September - India reports 13.5% Annual GDP growth in Q1 FY2023.
- 2 September - Prime Minister Narendra Modi commissioned India's first indigenous aircraft lifter IINS Vikrant in Kochi.
- 4 September - Indian business tycoon, former Tata Sons Chairman Cyrus Mistry, passes away in a car crash in Palghar.
- 5 September - Hemant Soren wins floor test in Jharkhand Legislative Assembly following allegations of corruption and poaching of MLA's by opposition.
- 6 September - ED and CBI raid on Manish Sisodia residence and 40 other locations on basis of Delhi liquor scam.
- 7 September - Rahul Gandhi commences his 3751 kms long 'Bharat Jodo Yatra' from Kanyakumari.
- 8 September - Rajpath renamed as Kartavya Path and inaugurated with Subhash Chandra Bose's statue at Central Vista by Narendra Modi.
- 16 September - 8 Cheetahs transported to Kuno National Park of India's Madhya Pradesh through a specially designated flight from Namibia, on account of Narendra Modi's birthday.
- 18 September - Murder of Ankita Bhandari.
- 22 September - National Investigation Agency conducts a raid on Popular Front of India in 13 states and arrests around 106 people for their alleged involvement in terrorism.
- 26 September - President of India appoints senior advocate R. Venkataramani as the next Attorney-General for India.
- 28 September - Ministry of Home Affairs bans radical Islamic organisation Popular Front of India and its eight connected organisations across the nation for five years.
- 29 September
  - Lt General Anil Chauhan appointed as the new Chief of Defence Staff.
  - The Supreme Court rules that all women are entitled to an abortion for up to 24 weeks after initial pregnancy as per the women's choice.

=== October ===
- 1 October - 5G telecom services launched in India, primarily in selected 13 cities of the country.
- 2 October - Tractor-Trolley returning from a temple falls into a pond in Kanpur, kills 27 people.
  - 2022 Bhadohi fire: Fourteen people died and more than 75 people were injured in the incident.
- 4 October - Avalanche in Uttarakashi kills nearly 30 mountaineers, from the Nehru Institute of Mountaineering.
- 5 October - An accident happened in Mal river in Malbazar, Jalpaiguri district, West Bengal during immersion of idols during Durga Puja, where 8 people died and many were seriously injured.
- 6 October - Congress president Sonia Gandhi joined the Bharat Jodo Yatra, which resumed its journey in Pandavapura in Karnataka's Mandya district on Thursday after a two-day Dasara break.
- 11 October - Chief Justice of India Uday Lalit, nominates DY Chandrachud as his successor, prior his retirement on 8 November.
- 13 October - Two bench Supreme Court Panel provided a split decision over the Hijab row, and would be further transferred to a larger CJI led bench.
- 14 October - Allahabad High Court, rejects the plea to carry out carbon-dating process on the alleged Shivaling, found in the surroundings of Gyanvyapi mosque.
- 17 October - Elections for the president of All India National Congress carried out. Former president Rahul Gandhi votes from Bellary, Karnataka.
- 19 October - Mallikarjun Kharge elected as the national President of Indian National Congress, thereby becoming the first Non-Gandhi president after 24 years by defeating his poll rival Shashi Tharoor.
- 25 October - ISIS terror plot; suicide bomber blasts a car in Coimbatore of Tamil Nadu with no casualties.
- 27 October - BCCI announces equal match fees to both men and women cricketers across all the formats of the game.
- 30 October - 2022 Morbi bridge collapse

=== November ===
- 1 November - The Air quality Index plunges to 'severe' category in Noida, remains 'very poor' in New Delhi, creation of thick smog in the city.
- 2 November - Global Investors Meet 2022 held in Bengaluru, with delegates and investors present from various countries.
- 6 November - Bhavya Bishnoi is elected to the Haryana Legislative Assembly for the Adampur, Haryana Assembly constituency in a by-election.
- 7 November - In Janhit Abhiyan vs Union of India case, Supreme Court upheld the validity of the 103rd constitutional amendment which provides 10% reservation for the Economically Weaker Sections by a 3-2 majority.
- 9 November - Logo with lotus launched, for the G-20 Summit hosted in India.
- 10 November - D. Y. Chandrachud takes oath as the 50th Chief Justice of India, succeeding Uday Lalit.
- 11 November -
  - Bangalore welcomes 2nd International airport terminal T2, with 108 ft statue of Kempe Gowda, the architect of Bangalore called 'The Statue of Prosperity', inaugurated by Narendra Modi.
  - All the 6 assassins of former Prime Minister Rajiv Gandhi released from prison, as per the orders of the Supreme Court of India.
- 12 November - 2022 Himachal Pradesh Legislative Assembly Elections, underway for 68 seats of the state.
- 14 November - Horrific Incident in Delhi; Man named Aftab kills girlfriend Shraddha Walker by strangling, chops the body into 35 pieces for dispose. Caught by the police department during the act.
- 18 November -
  - Vikram-S rocket, India's first rocket launch partnered with private space organisation with ISRO launched from Sriharikota.
  - BCCI sacks entire selection committee of the cricket board, led by Chetan Sharma.
  - " 3rd - No Money for Terror" - Counter Terrorism conference held under the presidency of Narendra Modi in New Delhi in the presence of International delegates.
- 20 November - Blast in an auto-rickshaw in Mangalore street, by accused Mohammed Shafiq using a pressure-cooker bomb.

=== December ===
- 1 December - Phase 1 of 2022 Gujarat Legislative Assembly Elections held.
- 2 December - Marriage of Dr Abhinav khare with Dr Palak Khare, NAVPAL
- 5 December - Phase 2 of 2022 Gujarat Legislative Assembly Elections carried out.
- 8 December - Result of 2022 Gujarat Legislative Assembly Elections and 2022 Himachal Pradesh Legislative Assembly election declared. Bharatiya Janata Party won a seventh consecutive term in Gujarat with a landslide victory (156 out of total 182 seats) and Indian National Congress toppled incumbent Bharatiya Janata Party government in Himachal Pradesh by bagging 40 out of 68 seats.
- 9 December - Indian soldiers clash with Chinese soldiers at the Tawang border of Arunachal Pradesh. No casualties, several injured.
- 12 December - Congress Leader Raja Pateria arrested for comments "Kill Prime Minister Modi to save constitution" in Madhya Pradesh.
- 13 December - 3 students die by suicide in Kota, Rajasthan.
- 20 December — India enacted its first domestic anti-piracy legislation as the Maritime Anti-Piracy Act 2022, criminalizing maritime piracy and empowering Indian agencies with the authority to respond to threats.
- 24 December - Tunisha Sharma, a television actress, who was playing the role of Mariyam, in Indian sitcom Ali Baba, died by suicide on the set of Ali Baba at the age of 20 just 11 days before her 21st birthday.
- 30 December -
  - Prime Minister Narendra Modi's mother, Heeraben Modi passes away at the age of 99 in Ahmedabad.
  - Cricketer Rishabh Pant meet with a major accident, his car (Mercedes-AMG GLE 43 4MATIC Coupe) collided with a road divider on the Delhi-Dehradun highway. He was admitted to AIIMS, Delhi.

== Deaths ==
=== January ===
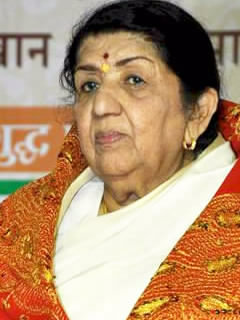
Lata Mangeshkar

- 4 – Sindhutai Sapkal, 73, social worker; cardiac arrest
- 8 – Ramesh Babu, 56, film actor
- 17 – Birju Maharaj, 83, dancer
- 18 – Narayan Debnath, 97, cartoonist
- 22 – Jaswant Singh, 90, field hockey player
- 29 - J.S. Bandukwala, 77, human rights activist; Sepsis

=== February ===
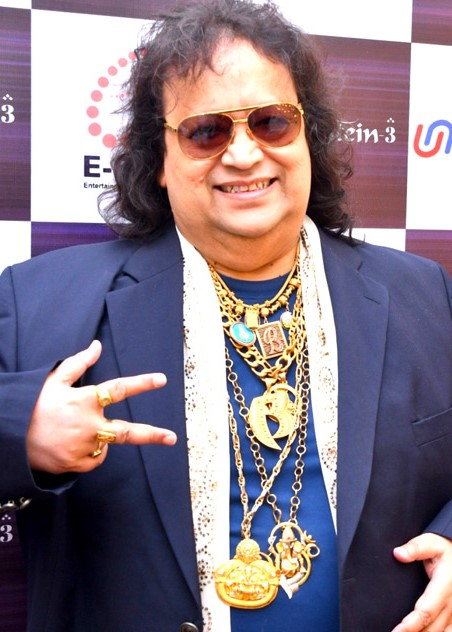
Bappi Lahiri

- 6 – Lata Mangeshkar, 92, singer; multiple organ dysfunction syndrome
- 15 – Bappi Lahiri, 69, music composer obstructive sleep apnea
- 15 – Sandhya Mukhopadhyay, 90, legendary Bengali singer, cardiac arrest
- 12 – Rahul Bajaj, 83, billionaire businessman and CEO of Bajaj Group
- 21 – Mekapati Goutham Reddy, 50, politician; heart attack

=== March ===
- 4 - Sunith Francis Rodrigues, 88, army officer
- 14 – Sandeep Nangal Ambian, 38, kabaddi player; shot dead
- 23 - Ramesh Chandra Lahoti, 81, 35th Chief Justice of India
- 24 - Abhishek Chatterjee, 57, actor

=== May ===
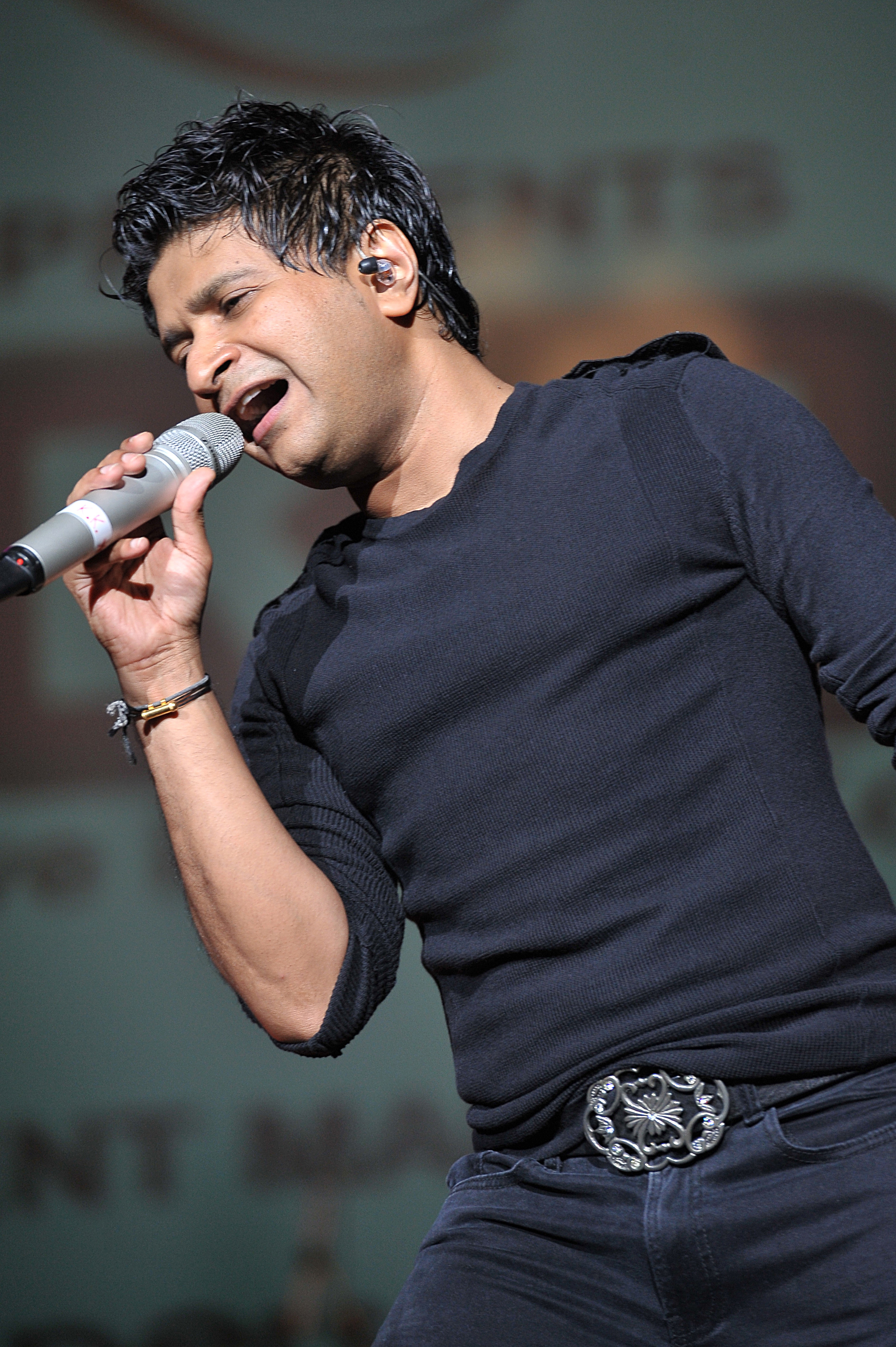
KK

- 10 – Shivkumar Sharma, 84, classical musician and santoor player, Cardiac arrest
- 11 - Sukh Ram, 94, politician
- 14 - Urvashi Vaid, 63, activist, lawyer, and writer
- 29 – Sidhu Moose Wala, 28, entertainer; shot dead
- 31 – KK, 54, Singer, Cardiac arrest
- 31 - Bhim Singh, 80, politician, activist, lawyer and author

=== June ===
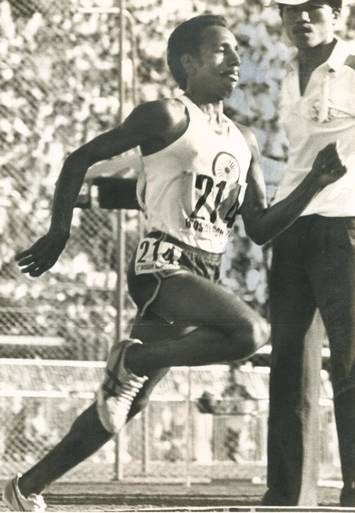
Hari Chand

- 13 – Hari Chand, 69, long-distance runner Olympian
- 15 - Gopi Chand Narang, 91, theorist, literary critic, and scholar
- 26 - V. Krishnamurthy, 97, civil servant
- 28 - Varinder Singh, 75, field hockey player
- 28 - Pallonji Mistry, 93, billionaire construction tycoon

=== July ===
- 3 - E.N. Sudhir, 74, footballer
- 4 - Tarun Majumdar, 91, film director
- 5 - P. Gopinathan Nair, 99, social worker
- 9 - B. K. Syngal, 82, Father of Internet & Data Services in India
- 12 - T. R. Prasad, 80, bureaucrat
- 15 - Pratap Pothen, 69, actor and filmmaker
- 18 - Bhupinder Singh, 82, musician
- 25 - Ashok Jagdale, 76, cricketer
- 26 - Sushovan Banerjee, 84, physician and politician
- 29 - Rasik Dave, 65, actor

=== August ===
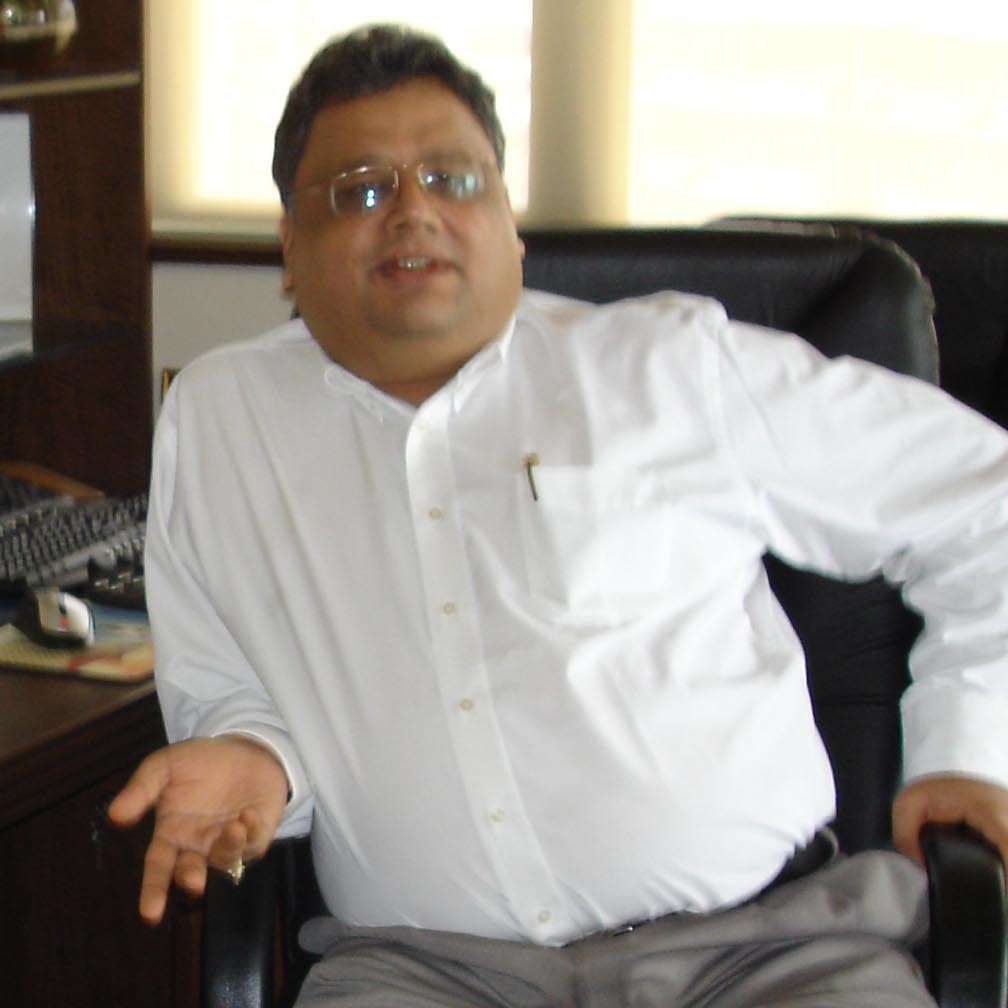
Rakesh Jhunjhunwala

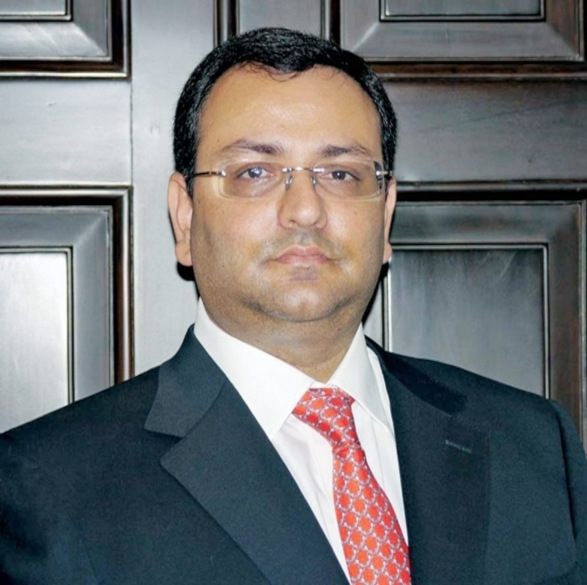
Cyrus Mistry

- 3 - Mithilesh Chaturvedi, 67, actor
- 5 - Debi Ghosal, 87, politician
- 8 - Sharad Hazare, 77, cricketer
- 9 - Pradeep Patwardhan, 65, actor and comedian
- 11 - Shimoga Subbanna, 83, singer
- 12 - Anshu Jain, 59, business executive
- 14 - Rakesh Jhunjhunwala, 62, stock trader and investor
- 14 - Vinayak Mete, 52, politician
- 16 - Subhash Singh, 59, politician
- 20 - Samar Banerjee, 92, footballer
- 20 - Syed Sibtey Razi, 83, politician
- 25 - Saawan Kumar Tak, 86, director, producer, and lyricist
- 25 - Devidhan Besra, 77, politician
- 26 - Jalaluddin Umri, 87, scholar and writer
- 29 - Pradip Mukherjee, 76, actor and dramatist
- 29 - Abhijit Sen, 71, economist

=== September ===
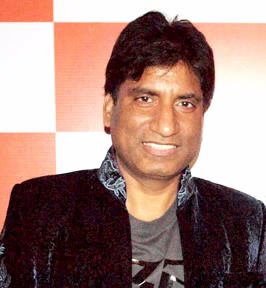
Raju Srivastav

- 1 - Mary Roy, 89, educator and activist
- 1 - Bamba Bakya, 49, singer and musician
- 2 - T. V. Sankaranarayanan, 77, singer
- 2 - Ramveer Upadhyay, 65, politician
- 4 - Cyrus Mistry, 54, businessman
- 6 - Umesh Katti, 61, Karnataka politician
- 7 - Ramchandra Manjhi, 97, Bhojpuri folk dancer
- 8 - Kamal Narain Singh, 95, 22nd Chief Justice of India
- 10 - B. B. Lal, 101, archaeologist
- 11 - Krishnam Raju, 82, actor and politician
- 11 - Swaroopanand Saraswati, 98, religious leader
- 13 - N. M. Joseph, 78, politician
- 13 - Faisal Saif, 46, film director
- 14 - Naresh Kumar, 93, tennis player
- 17 - Manikrao Hodlya Gavit, 87, politician
- 19 - Bishnu Sethi, 61, politician
- 21 - Raju Srivastav, 58, comedian

=== October ===
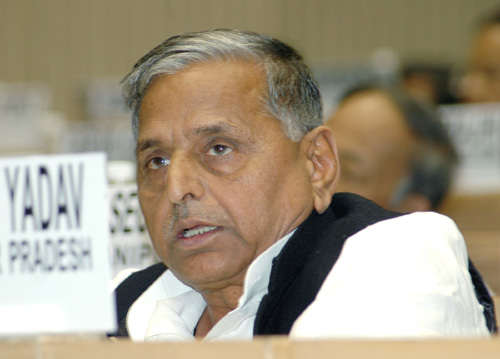
Mulayam Singh Yadav

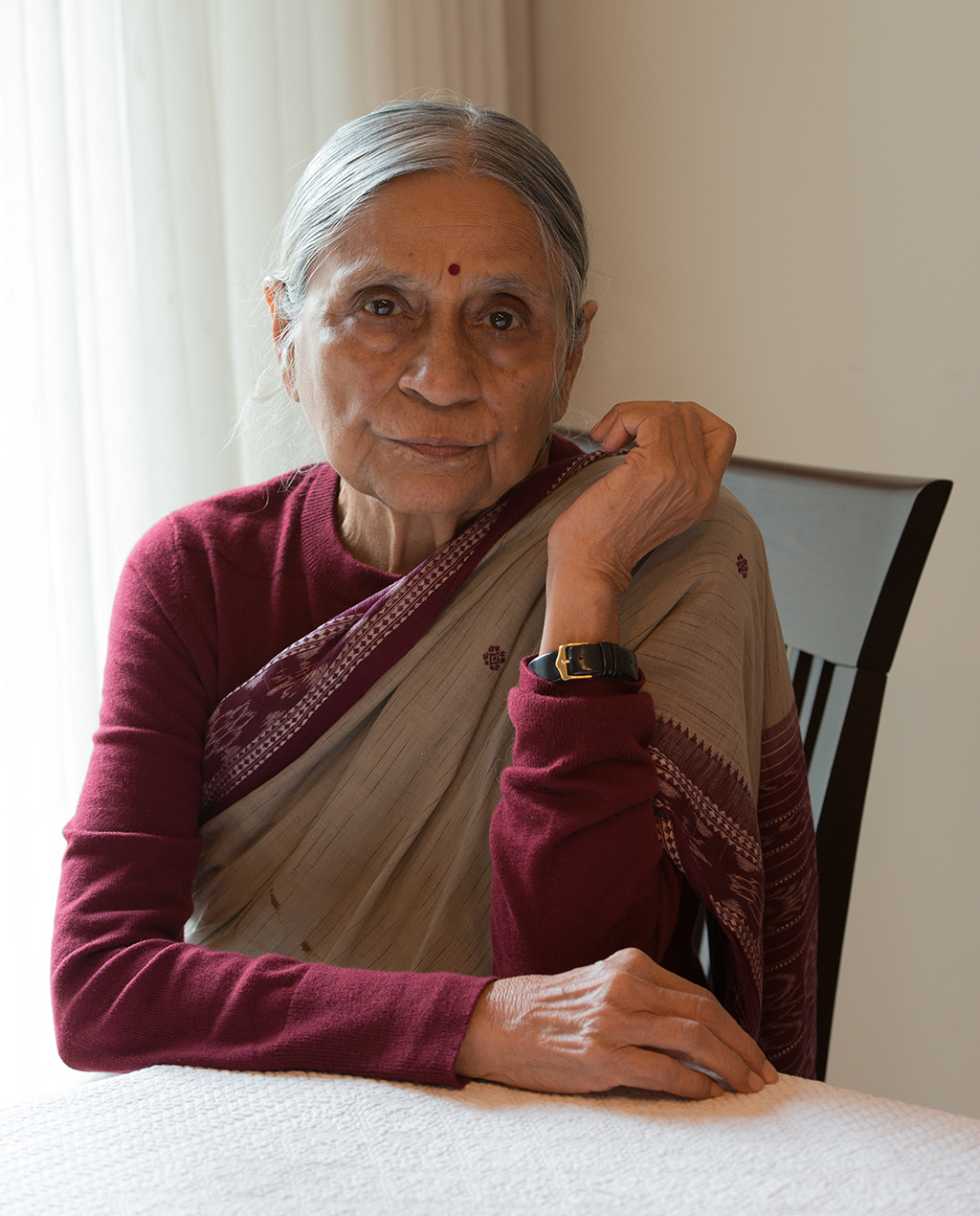
Ela Bhatt

- 1 - Tulsi Tanti, 64, businessman
- 1 - Kodiyeri Balakrishnan, 68, kerala politician
- 4 - Shekhar Joshi, 90, author.
- 7 - Arun Bali, 79, actor
- 9 - Temsüla Ao, 76, poet and writer
- 9 - Bhanwar Lal Sharma, 77, rajasthan politician
- 10 - Mulayam Singh Yadav, 82, politician
- 10 - Subbu Arumugam, 94, writer and storyteller.
- 11 - A. Gopalakrishnan, 85, nuclear engineer.
- 14 - Kedar Singh Phonia, 92, uttarakhand politician
- 15 - K. Murari, 78, film producer
- 16 - Vaishali Takkar, 30, actress
- 16 - Dilip Mahalanabis, 87, pediatrician
- 22 - Anand Mamani, 56, deputy speaker of Karnataka LA.
- 26 - Esmayeel Shroff, 62, film director

=== November ===
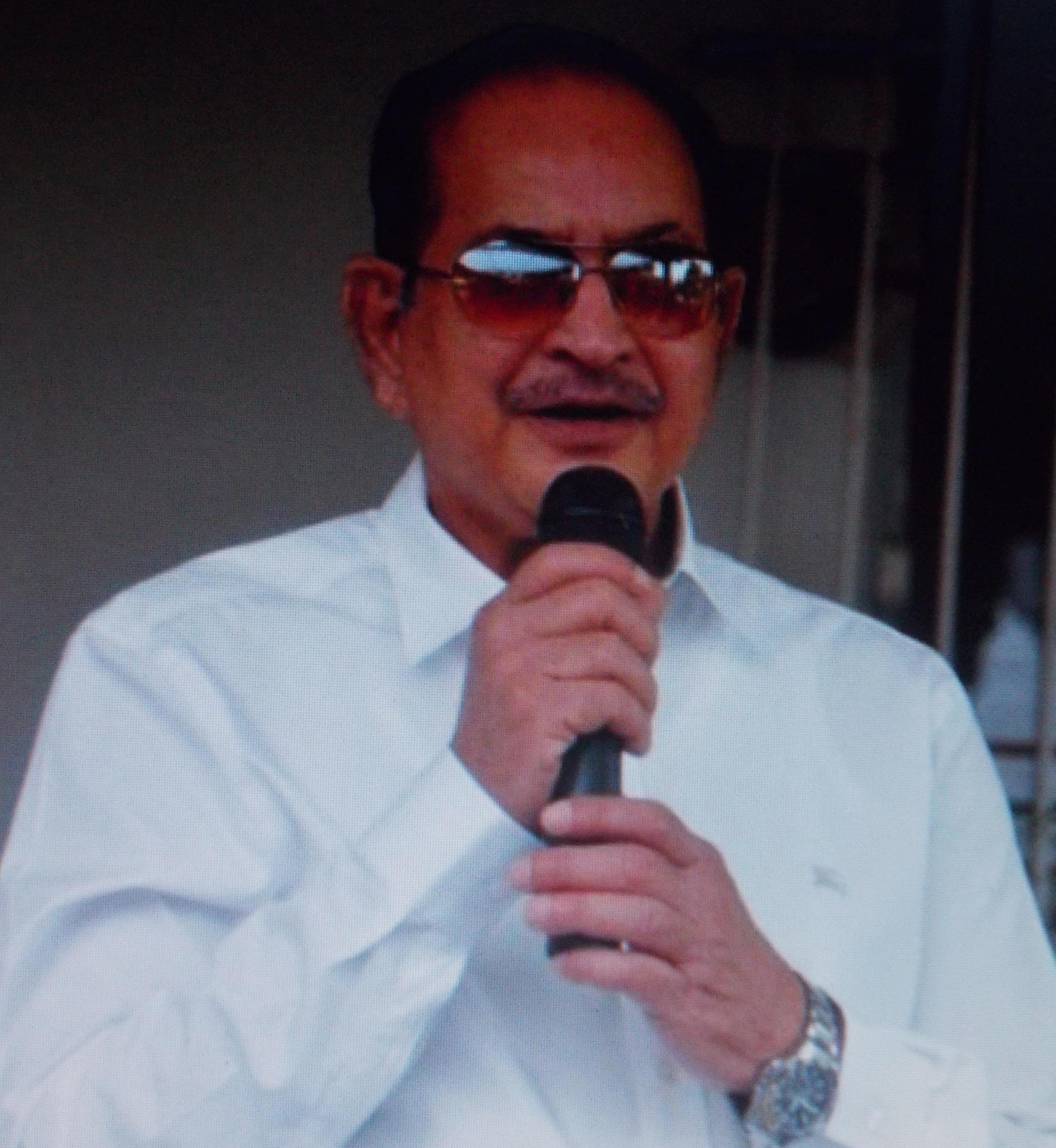
Krishna

- 1 - Vijayakumar Menon, 76, art critic and writer
- 2 - Ela Bhatt, 89, social activist
- 2 - T. P. Rajeevan, 63, novelist
- 2 - Jambey Tashi, 44, politician
- 3 - G. S. Varadachary, 90, film critic and journalist
- 5 - Hyder Ali, 79, cricketer
- 5 - Shyam Saran Negi, 105, schoolteacher and the country's first voter
- 8 - Lohithaswa, 80, actor
- 10 - Rajni Kumar, 99, English-born educationalist, founder of the Springdales Schools
- 11 - Siddhaanth Vir Surryavanshi, 47, actor
- 12 - Mohammad Nejatullah Siddiqi, 91, economist
- 15 - Krishna, 79, actor
- 18 - Tabassum, 78, actress
- 19 - Babu Mani, 59, footballer
- 20 - Aaroor Dass, 91, screenwriter
- 20 - Aindrila Sharma, 24, actress
- 21 - Avvai Natarajan, 86, academic administrator,
- 26 - Vikram Gokhale, 77, actor
- 30 - Vikram Kirloskar, 64, businessman
- 30 - Kumble Sundara Rao, 88, Yakshagana artist and politician
- 30 - Nagnath Lalujirao Kottapalle, 74, writer and academic administrator

=== December ===
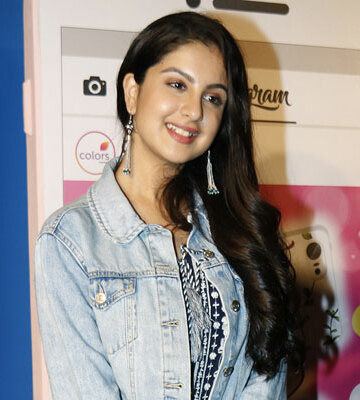
Tunisha Sharma

- 1 - Vasu Pisharody, 79, Kathakali actor
- 1 - Samresh Singh, 81, Indian politician
- 2 - Tukaram Gangadhar Gadakh, 69, politician
- 2 - Jharana Das, 82, actress
- 5 - Ahmad Ali Barqi Azmi, 67, poet
- 6 - Yoginder K Alagh, 83, economist
- 7 - Manohar Devadoss, 86, visual artist and writer
- 9 - Sulochana Chavan, 89, Marathi singer
- 10 - Kenneth Powell, 82, Olympic sprinter
- 12 - Mohan Jena, 65, politician
- 13 - Ranjit Singh Brahmpura, 85, politician
- 24 - Tunisha Sharma, 20, actress

== See also ==
- 2022 in Manipur

=== Country overviews ===
- History of India
- History of modern India
- Outline of India
- Government of India
- Politics of India
- Timeline of Indian history
- Years in India

=== Related timelines for current period ===
- 2020s in political history
- 2020s
- 21st century
