= List of populated places in Noney district =

Villages in Noney district of Manipur, India

The Noney district of Manipur state has 4 subdivisions. It was created in 2016: at the time of the 2011 Census of India, it was a part of the Tamenglong district.

== Subdivisions ==
The Noney district has four subdivisions:

- Haochong
- Khoupum
- Longmai
- Nungba

== Villages ==
=== Haochong subdivision ===
The Haochong subdivision has following villages:

Name	Population	Effective literacy rate	Sex ratio	SC population %	ST population %	Census code (2011)
Awangkhul	1821	62.61%	921	0.05%	93.19%	269184
Bakua (Bakwa)	334	87.23%	1037	0.0%	100.0%	269206
Ejeirong	426	63.4%	972	0.0%	99.77%	269190
Haochong	1235	92.33%	930	0.0%	99.35%	269192
Kabui Khullen	997	46.06%	947	0.0%	99.9%	269194
Kajinglong	335	90.33%	772	0.0%	100.0%	269196
Langkhong	1183	55.16%	1057	0.0%	99.15%	269185
Lukhambi	1520	75.04%	1016	0.0%	99.61%	269186
Maranging	1582	74.64%	934	0.0%	99.43%	269189
Nagaching	1019	48.95%	934	0.0%	99.21%	269187
Nungtek	859	83.95%	926	0.0%	99.3%	269188
Oktan	783	50.44%	953	0.0%	99.74%	269193
Punglam	221	55.11%	797	0.0%	100.0%	269198
Pungmon	519	54.11%	915	0.0%	100.0%	269191
Taobam	571	68.26%	694	0.35%	88.62%	269183
Thingra	805	68.41%	1007	0.0%	99.5%	269195

=== Khoupum subdivision ===
The Khoupum subdivision has following villages:

Name	Population	Effective literacy rate	Sex ratio	SC population %	ST population %	Census code (2011)
Chingmei Kabui	212	62.01%	782	0.0%	100.0%	269248
Dollang	1026	68.05%	907	0.0%	97.66%	269261
Jouzangtek	391	47.08%	1080	0.0%	99.49%	269262
Khoupum	4279	76.44%	1013	0.0%	99.0%	269243
Lamdangmei	607	90.81%	715	0.0%	89.62%	269258
Laphok	203	82.14%	781	0.0%	100.0%	269257
Leishok (Leisok)	460	66.93%	870	0.0%	98.7%	269251
Lubanglong	931	71.28%	944	0.0%	99.46%	269241
Luwanglong Khullen	876	55.24%	947	0.0%	98.63%	269264
Luwanglong Khunou	1223	78.54%	1018	0.0%	99.59%	269252
Molphei	48	39.47%	778	0.0%	100.0%	269247
Nungadang	942	84.51%	1052	0.0%	99.36%	269244
Nungbai	218	49.74%	1117	0.0%	98.62%	269245
Nungnang	2030	48.57%	1038	0.0%	97.98%	269249
Nungsai	544	63.0%	950	0.0%	99.26%	269263
Pungsang	156	70.23%	950	0.0%	99.36%	269246
Ragailong	102	62.22%	821	0.0%	100.0%	269240
Satu	442	76.41%	1095	0.0%	99.32%	269242
Shangji	403	44.2%	919	0.0%	98.51%	269260
Tamlok	182	35.4%	767	0.0%	97.25%	269253
Thangal	1361	74.21%	970	0.0%	99.85%	269259
Tousang	995	73.45%	1035	0.0%	99.4%	269250

=== Longmai subdivision ===
The Longmai subdivision has following villages:

Name	Population	Effective literacy rate	Sex ratio	SC population %	ST population %	Census code (2011)
Charoi Chakotlong I (Charoi I)	501	97.25%	802	0.2%	85.43%	269255
Noney	3854	86.9%	801	0.13%	60.69%	269254

=== Nungba subdivision ===
The Nungba subdivision has following villages:

Name	Population	Effective literacy rate	Sex ratio	SC population %	ST population %	Census code (2011)
Bijang	130	66.39%	733	0.0%	97.69%	269228
Bolongdai	872	80.34%	973	0.0%	99.77%	269213
Bolphai	76	41.67%	900	0.0%	98.68%	269234
Changjal	114	82.0%	754	0.0%	98.25%	269222
Charoi Chakotlong II	1262	65.55%	978	0.0%	98.02%	269256
Chongmun	272	34.29%	957	0.0%	100.0%	269232
Gallon	314	66.55%	915	0.0%	97.77%	269233
K. Daveijang	91	17.07%	625	0.0%	100.0%	269224
Kambiron	911	63.64%	942	0.0%	99.34%	269215
Kekrunaga (Kekru-Naga)	489	49.28%	925	0.0%	100.0%	269216
Khongsang	781	83.89%	787	0.0%	88.48%	269210
Laihaojang	167	90.58%	815	0.0%	100.0%	269226
Leikot	96	85.54%	745	0.0%	97.92%	269221
Lenglong	1819	73.77%	885	0.0%	100.0%	269143
Longkaiphun	220	18.62%	1056	0.0%	99.55%	269223
Longphailum	255	86.22%	1073	0.0%	98.43%	269227
Longpi	530	89.36%	920	0.0%	99.25%	269235
Mongjarong Khunou (Mongjaron Khunou)	1495	61.15%	975	0.0%	99.46%	269211
Mongjarong Khullen (Mongjaron Khullen)	762	29.75%	969	0.0%	98.95%	269212
Muktina	218	82.35%	1057	0.0%	97.71%	269218
Mukti Khullen	983	69.03%	905	0.0%	98.88%	269217
Nungba	2222	74.9%	987	0.0%	65.44%	269214
Nungthut	138	81.98%	971	0.0%	82.61%	269219
Okoklong	417	63.04%	958	0.0%	100.0%	269209
S. Molbung	149	71.43%	713	0.0%	100.0%	269230
Sekjang	119	85.58%	889	0.0%	97.48%	269229
Sempat Gangte	205	60.34%	1135	0.0%	99.51%	269239
Sempat Naga	117	75.7%	746	0.0%	100.0%	269238
T. Molbung (T. Motbung)	42	70.0%	1211	0.0%	100.0%	269225
T. Khongmol	176	81.65%	725	0.0%	100.0%	269220
Taikhang	281	94.53%	1145	0.0%	99.64%	269237
Thingou	319	70.85%	910	0.0%	100.0%	269208
Tuiphai	271	54.63%	964	0.0%	99.26%	269231

== See also ==
- List of populated places in Tamenglong district
- List of populated places in Kangpokpi district
- List of populated places in Churachandpur district
- List of populated places in Pherzawl district
