= 2026 North East Games =

Sport event held in Northeast India

- Location: Arunachal Pradesh
- Start date: 12 October 2026
- End date: 18 October 2026
- Teams: 8

The 2026 North East Games is the 4th Edition of North East Games. The event will be hosted by Arunachal Pradesh from 12 October to 18 October 2026.

== History ==
In 2018, Manipur hosted the first edition of North East Olympic Games. 2020 edition was cancelled for COVID-19 Pandemic. The 2022 edition was scheduled to be hosted by Arunachal Pradesh, but it was hosted by Meghalaya commemorating the Golden Jubilee of Meghalaya's Statehood. The 2024 North East Olympic Games was hosted by Nagaland.

In 2024, 'Olympic' word was removed from the game name and it became North East Games.

== See also ==
- North East Games
