= 2024 North East Olympic Games =

Sports tournament in 2024

- Venue: Chümoukedima, Dimapur and Kohima
- Location: Nagaland
- Start date: 18 March 2024
- End date: 23 March 2024
- Competitors: 3000+
- Teams: 8

The 2024 North East Olympic Games (2024 NEOG) was the 3rd edition of North East Olympic Games. Held in Nagaland, the CM of Nagaland Neiphiu Rio inaugurated the event on 18 March 2024.

== History ==
The first edition of the tournament held in Manipur in 2018.

The 2022 NEOG was to be held in Arunachal Pradesh in 2020, but was postponed due to the COVID-19 pandemic. The 2022 NEOG was meant in part to commemorate the 50th year of host state Meghalaya's statehood.

== Disciplines ==
Over 3000 athletes from 8 States of Northeast India participated in 15 disciplines, held across 12 venues in three districts of Nagaland—Chümoukedima, Dimapur and Kohima. Games involved in this competition include archery, athletics, badminton, basketball, boxing, football, lawn tennis, pencak silat, table tennis, taekwondo, volleyball, and wushu.

== Results ==
1. Assam (23.0%)
2. Nagaland (21.9%)
3. Manipur (21.3%)
4. Mizoram (9.49%)
5. Meghalaya (9.00%)
6. Arunachal Pradesh (7.70%)
7. Sikkim (5.07%)
8. Tripura (2.60%)
Total medal distribution comparison between State teams.

=== Medal tally ===
Rank	Team	Gold	Silver	Bronze	Total
1	Manipur	52	38	40	130
2	Nagaland	48	42	44	134
3	Assam	43	44	53	140
4	Mizoram	16	15	27	58
5	Arunachal Pradesh	8	12	27	47
6	Sikkim	5	7	19	31
7	Meghalaya	2	12	41	55
8	Tripura	1	4	11	16
Total		175	174	262	611

Manipur emerged as the overall champion, while Nagaland gained first runner up and Assam being third on medal tally and second runner up.

== See also ==
- North East Games
- 2022 North East Olympic Games
- Manipur Olympic Games 2022
