= Pongringlong (Charoi pandongba) =

- Charoipandongba Kabui Village
- Interactive map of Pongringlong
- Country: India
- State: Manipur
- District: Senapati
- Sub Division: Saitu-Gamphazol

Population
  - Total: 816
- PIN code(s): 795 159

Pongringlong (Charoipandongba), also known locally as Puangringluang, is a Rongmei Naga village located along NH 37. The village is located within the Saitu Gamphazol subdivision of Senapati district, Manipur state, India. The villagers are mostly small farmers practicing Slash-and-burn, or jhum, cultivation of land that is communally owned.

== Etymology ==
Pongringlong derives from the range of hills where Puangring Pwang, a species of flower, grows abundantly near the site selected for the village. Thus the elders named the area Pongringlong Village.

Pongringlong Village was officially named Charoipandongba (from the Meitei words 'Charoi', referring to 'Black Sparrow', and 'Pandongba', referring to 'sitting on the village fence') by a Meitei king during his visit to the village, according to village elders.

== History ==
Those who settled that would become Pongringlong Village were the descendants of the Tenyimi family, scattered from the [[Makhel]] to the Ramting Kabin, who migrated to Gwangpuning and later to Makuilongdi. According to Gangmumei Kamei, Rembangbe—the third son of Chief Nguiba of Makuilongdi Village—and some villagers migrated to the south and called themselves Rongmei, or Marongmei (southerners or people migrated to the south). They first settled in Kajinglong, and in succeeding generations people went out in many directions, founding villages to the south of the Irang River.

According to traditional practice, the band or group of exogamous clans (led by elders) ensure the settlement (Nam Phumei) would be secure and safe from outside attack, would have water sources, and would have good vegetation for hunting and for cultivation. The founding of Pongringlong Village is no exception. The family of Reikhamnang Daimei and Namdirei Malangmei (disguising himself as being from the Khandangmei clan for his safety) selected the new site and settled in Thing-gi-puram (above Pongringlong Pondaijang Part IV).

The site was not conducive to settlement, and they invited Maoteina Panmei to join them to search for a new site. They named the location they found Pongringlong (hill range of the Puangring Pwan species of flower). The water sources they found were named for their clans: Khundaipang for the Malangmei Clan, Luangsangpang for the Daimei Clan, and Changphaipang for the Panmei Clan. Already having found and named water sources for each clan, they found another on their way and named it Luandaipang, according to village elders.

The village prospered and grew in size both by procreation and by adding and registering (Pei Kho Joulai Puanloumei) new members from kinsmen of the founding clans. The three founding clans (Daimei, Malangmei/Khandangmei, and Panmei) have their associated water sources, Memorial Stone heap (Tau Khuan) for burial, and Ramphung (ranges of land used for farming). The village has been divided into different sections, or 'khel': Part I (Pongringlong Chingkao), Part II (Pongringlong Kanungjang), Part III (Pongringlong Machunjang), and Part IV (Pongringlong Pondaijang), whose clans are the Malangmei, Daimei, Panmei, Gangmei, Kamei, and Phaomei.

== Geography ==
Pongringlong Village is located 166 kilometres (103 mi) from Senapati district headquarters—via NH-37, or via Jiribam Imphal Road and NH-102A—and is 11 kilometres (6.8 mi) from Noney district. The village is bordered by the Tupul River (Phaan Dui Thuak) on the south; by Makhuam Village and the Aga River on the west; by Kharam Village, Sehjang Village, and the Taru River on the north; and by Mangshen Haibut and Rukhunpang on the east. The village is physically divided into four parts, or khel: Part I (Pongringlong Chingkao), Part II (Pongringlong Kanungjang), Part III (Pongringlong Machunjang) and Part IV (Pongringlong Pondaijang).

Important historical tourist spots—such as Kimbut (where Gairiamnang played his music), Luangdaimei (where Loichingmei once lived), Mangshen Haibut (where the British communicated by mirror flashes)—are the pride of the village, the Zeliangrong in particular, and of the Naga as a whole. The nearest bank is the State Bank of India branch at the Noney army camp.

== Demographics ==
According to the Indian census of 2011, Pongringlong (Charoipandongba) Village has 155 family households, with approximately 816 members: 400 of whom are male and 416 are female, for a sex ratio of 1040 females per 1000 males, which is higher than the state ratio of 985, the child sex ratio being 892 which is lower than the state child ratio of 930. The village literacy rate is 54.83%, which is lower than the state literacy rate of 76.94%, with the literacy rate for males being 64.18%, for females, 46.09%.

99% of the villagers speak the Rongmei dialect. Few speak English, Hindi, or Manipuri.

The major religions are Christian (Baptist and Catholic), with Tingkao Ragwang Chapriak (TRC) religion being still found in Pongringlong parts I and III.

== Administration ==
Before the splitting of Manipur district into seven new districts, the village was in Senapati district, within the Saitu Gramphazol subdivision, with its post office and police station at Langjing. Due to being distant from the Senapati district headquarters, the Langjing police and post office referred the villagers to the Tupul-Noney police and post office in the Tamenglong district, which was more convenient for both villagers and authorities. These inconveniences led to the villagers wanting to have the village be part of the newly created Noney district, which is just 11 kilometres (6.8 mi) away.

Given the freedom to uphold the Naga Customary Law and Code of Conduct by the Indian Constitution in Article 371 (A), and following, the Pongringlong Village Council (Pei) is the apex administrative body of the village. The village council comprises village elders, who handle issues such as land disputes, resource disputes, criminality, divorce, minor offences, and tasks related to new membership in the village. The Pongringlong Village Authority, headed by a chairman, established under the Manipur Village Authority Act 1956, is a body parallel to the Pei. The Village Authority handles formal administrative and developmental work for the village. Religious institutions are independent. All these social institutions co-exist mutually and interdependently to serve the economic, political, religious, and social needs of the villagers.

The Pongringlong pincode is 795159 and the postal head office is at Noney.

== Communal ownership and land use ==
Pongringlong Village land and resources are held in common, which is usual among the Zeliangrong community and the Naga people, a society that is egalitarian, with equal ownership of land by all the members of a village. Land is a crucial in defining the Naga in general and the village in particular. Forceful occupation of their land is an attack on their identity and culture. The chief or headman is the caretaker of the village's land and resources. He is ordained by the Pei (Village Council), based on his hereditary seniority from the village's founding clans. He should have an exceptionally fine character, without blemish (Heak Chuimei Panti).

Terms used by the Pongringlong Village Pei with regard to land and natural resources include Ramphung (range of land associated with a certain founding clan, commonly understood in the manner of responsibility, egalitarian spirit, respect for the land, and also respect for the village's founding clans). The Pei decides which Ramphung will be cultivated in the coming years. The clan associated with that Ramphung has the responsibility to bless the land for fertility and for a good harvest. All the households of the village will select the plots to be cultivated and each plot allotted to a household is called a Lauru (selected/chosen cultivated field). It is clear that the Ramphung encompass all the villagers' Lauru. Selling, giving, and buying village land, or Lauru, to those outside the village or other than kinsmen is illegal by the customs and code of the village Pei.
