= Sport in Meghalaya =

Meghalaya has a variety of sports. The Meghalaya Games are hosted annually in the state.

The 2022 North East Olympic Games were hosted in the state.

Around ₹1,000 crore (US$110 million) will be committed to developing sports in Meghalaya by the government from 2024 to 2028.

== Traditional games ==
Meghalaya has a rich indigenous sporting heritage among its three major tribes, the Khasi, Garo and Jaintia. Some of these indigenous games are included in the Meghalaya Games.

Archery is still common in some villages, with a colonial-era custom of betting on polo matches now prevalent in modern archery competitions.
