= Assam at the North East Games =

Sporting event delegation

Assam is one of the eight states of India that competes in the North East Games.

== History ==
Assam first competed at the 2018 North East Olympic Games at Manipur. The team end up being the runner up with total of 140 Medals, out of which 46 were gold medals, 53 silver medals and 41 bronze medals. In 2022 North East Olympic Games, Assam ranks second at medal tally being the runner up with a total of 203 medals including 79 gold medals. At the 2024 North East Olympic Games, Assam came third at medal tally while Manipur emerges as overall champion and Nagaland being the runner up. Assam won 140 medals including 43 gold, 44 silver and 53 bronze medals.

== Medal table ==
| Year | Gold | Silver | Bronze | Total | Ref |
|---|---|---|---|---|---|
| 2018 | 46 | 53 | 41 | 140 | |
| 2022 | 79 | 61 | 63 | 203 | |
| 2024 | 43 | 44 | 53 | 140 | |
| Total | 168 | 158 | 157 | 483 | |

== See also ==
- North East Games
- Manipur at the North East Games
