= Robinhood the Animal Rescuer =

Animal rescue organization in Bangladesh

RobinHood The Animal Rescuer
- Formation: 2010
- Founder: Afzal Khan
- Purpose: animal rescue animal welfare animal legal aid
- Location: Dhaka, Bangladesh
- Website: robinhoodrescue.org

Robinhood the Animal Rescuer is a Bangladesh-based animal rescuer voluntary organization that works with the National Emergency Service of Bangladesh. It was established in 2010 by Afzal Khan. During the 2022 India–Bangladesh floods, Robinhood worked with the Bangladesh government to rescue flood-affected animals. Robinhood voluntarily provides legal aid in animal abuse cases, healthcare services, and rescues stuck animals.
