= 2022 in Manipur =

Events in the year 2022 in Manipur

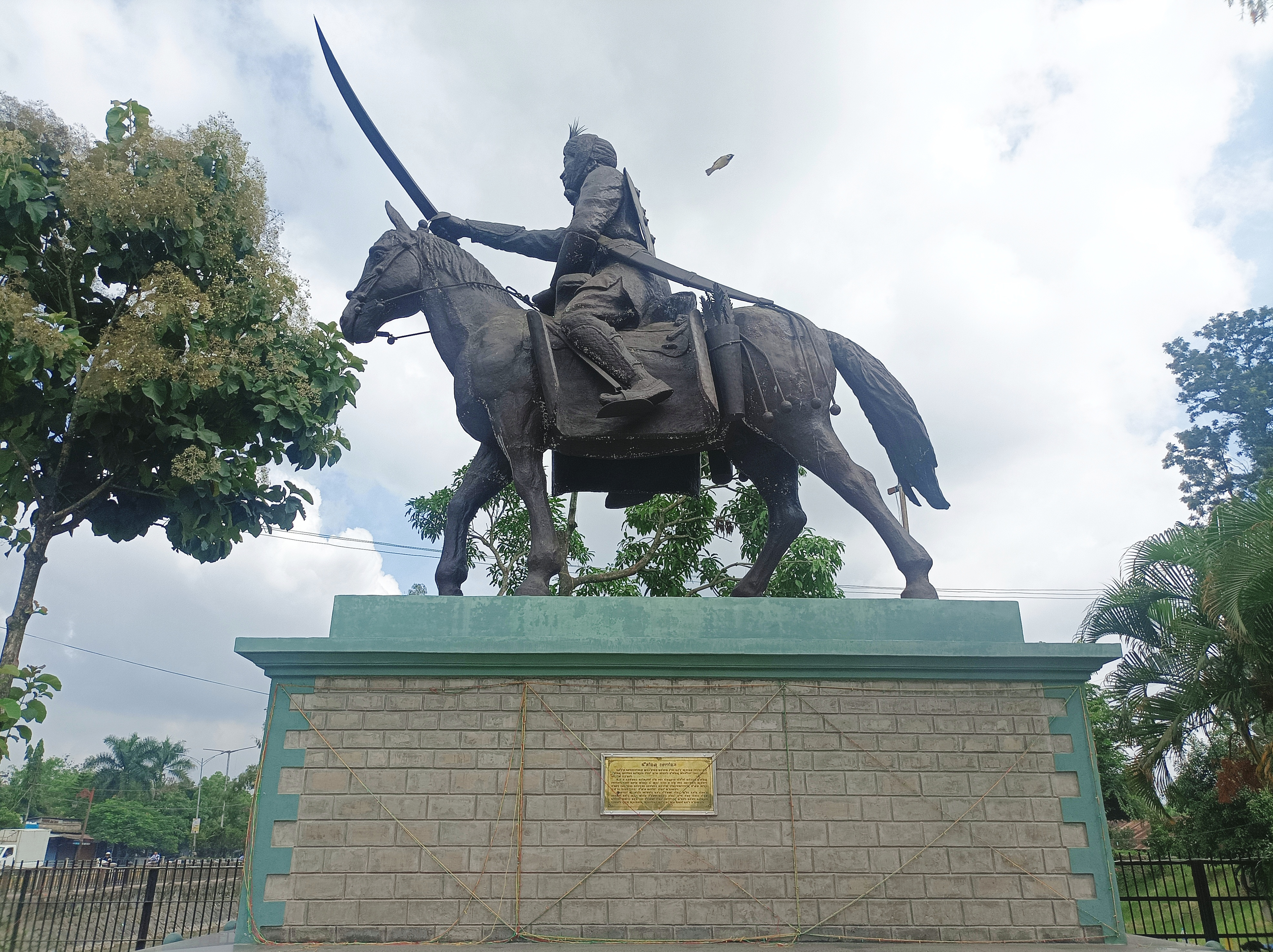
On 15 June 2022, a bronze statue of Meitei king Meidingu Nara Singh (1844-1850 A.D.) was unveiled by Nongthombam Biren Singh, the Chief Minister of Manipur, in front of the Kangla Sanathong, the Western Entrance to the Kangla Fort in Imphal.

== Incumbents ==
- Governor of Manipur - La Ganesan
- Chief Minister of Manipur - Nongthombam Biren Singh
- Government of Manipur - Second N. Biren Singh ministry

== Events ==
Ongoing
— COVID-19 pandemic
— Meitei classical language movement
— Meitei linguistic purism movement

- 28 January - A unanimous resolution was passed by the "Meetei Erol Eyek Loinasillol Apunba Lup" (MEELAL), "All Manipur Working Journalists’ Union" (AMWJU) and "Editors' Guild Manipur" (EGM) in Imphal that all the newspapers in Meitei language (officially called Manipuri language) will be using the Meitei script (Meitei: Meetei Mayek) instead of the Bengali script from 15 January 2023; 3 years ago.
- 28 February to 5 March - 2022 Manipur Legislative Assembly election
- 28 February to 5 March - 12th Manipur Assembly
- 6 May - Inside the Kangla Fort, the "Institute of Bioresources and Sustainable Development" (IBSD), Imphal, planted around 50 fruit bearing plants.
- 11 May - Google Translate added Meitei language (under the name "Meiteilon (Manipuri)") during its addition of 24 new languages to the translation tool. The writing system used for Meitei language in this tool is Meitei script.
- 15 June - Statue of Meidingu Nara Singh was unveiled in the Kangla Sanathong (Western Kangla Gate) by Nongthombam Biren Singh, the Chief Minister of Manipur.
- 19 June - Nongthombam Biren Singh, the Chief Minister of Manipur, flagged off an E-Rickshaw roadshow at the Kangla Sanathong (Kangla Western Gate) in Imphal.
- 25 June - "Green Imphal City Campaign" was organised under the theme "Planting towards Greener, Cleaner Imphal" by the Department of Municipal Administration, Housing and Urban Development (MAHUD) in the Kangla Nongpok Torban.
- 27 June - At the Kangla Sanathong (Western Kangla Gate, Nongthombam Biren Singh, the Chief Minister of Manipur, flagged off the "Relief Assistance & Disaster Response Team" for the flood-affected people of Assam. Along with the relief materials consisting of 135 quintals of rice, 102 bags of dal, 120 bags of salt, 120 boxes of mustard oil, 40 personnels of State Disaster Response Force (SDRF) were also sent for rescue operations.
- 30 June - 2022 Manipur landslide
- 5 August - The Manipur State Legislative Assembly re-affirmed a resolution to record the Sanamahi religion (Sanamahism) in the Indian census data with a separate unique code as an officially recognised minority religion of India.
- 20 August - 31st anniversary to the Meitei Language Day was observed.
- 26 August 2022 to 30 August - Manipur Olympic Games 2022
- 18 September - The "Bio Clean Water Care Service OPC Private Limited" installed four bio toilets in the Kangla Nongpok Torban under PPP model, without taking any charges from the government of Manipur. It is the first of its kind in Imphal.
- 16 September - The Government of Manipur set up a 15-member committee to verify the accuracy of books written about history, culture, tradition, and geography of Manipur, to avoid the distortion of facts, and also mandated the authors of the said subjects to submit their manuscripts (prior to publication) to the Director of Higher Education and University of Manipur, for verification and approval, failing which legal actions of prosecution will be taken up.

== Deaths ==
- 30 June - 2022 Manipur landslide - number of people died is 49 (as per the discovery of dead bodies as of 9 July).

== See also ==
- History of Manipur
