= Meghalaya Games =

Annual sports event held in Meghalaya, India

- Founded: 2001
- Country: India
- Website: https://megsports.gov.in/

The Meghalaya Games are a sports event held in Meghalaya, India which were started in 2001. After a long break, the event was revived in 2019, and is to be held annually from 2024 onwards.

Some indigenous tribal games have been included in the event since the third edition.

== 2024 Meghalaya Games ==
The 2024 games, held in Tura, were originally to be held in 2023, but were postponed. They were held from 15 to 20 January 2024, with 22 sporting disciplines to be contested, and ₹23 crore (US$2.4 million) to be spent on the event.

Traditional indigenous games of the three major Meghalaya tribes featured in the games included maw-point (the Khasi equivalent of the game of seven stones), rah mukhrah (a Jaintia traditional game, where the competitors carry a heavy rock to the finish line), and wa’pong sika (a Garo traditional game, where two teams compete to push a bamboo pole towards the opponent’s goal post) The games were opened on 15 January by President Droupadi Murmu.

== See also ==
- North East Olympic Games
- Fit India
