= Lubanglong =

Lubanglong is a Rongmei village located in the Khoupum Valley of Noney district, Manipur, India. It consists of 150-200 households.
