= 2020 Assam floods =

Natural disaster in Northeast India

- State of Assam in north-east India
- Date: May 2020 – August 2020 (3 months)
- Location: Assam, India: 30 out of 33 districts; 5,474 out of 26,395 villages
- Cause: Heavy monsoon rains
- Deaths: 149
- Website: sdmassam.nic.in

2020 Assam floods refers to the significant flood event of the Brahmaputra River in the Indian north-eastern state of Assam and coincided with the COVID-19 pandemic. Initial flooding started in May 2020 due to heavy rainfall affecting 30,000 and destroying crops across 5 districts. As of October 2020 the floods affected over five million people, claiming the lives of 123 people, with an additional 26 deaths due to landslides, 5474 villages were affected and over one hundred and fifty thousand people found refuge in relief camps.

== Background ==
Due to its tropical monsoon climate, the state of Assam is prone to annual flooding. While the monsoons are important for the largely agriculture dependent regional economy, they now cause annually recurring destruction of infrastructure, crops, livelihoods and loss of lives. Although annual precipitation is declining, daily rainfall data shows an increase in extreme rainfall events, leading to extreme flooding in Assam. Higher temporal and spatial variability of rainfall across the regions has been attributed to the impact of climate change.

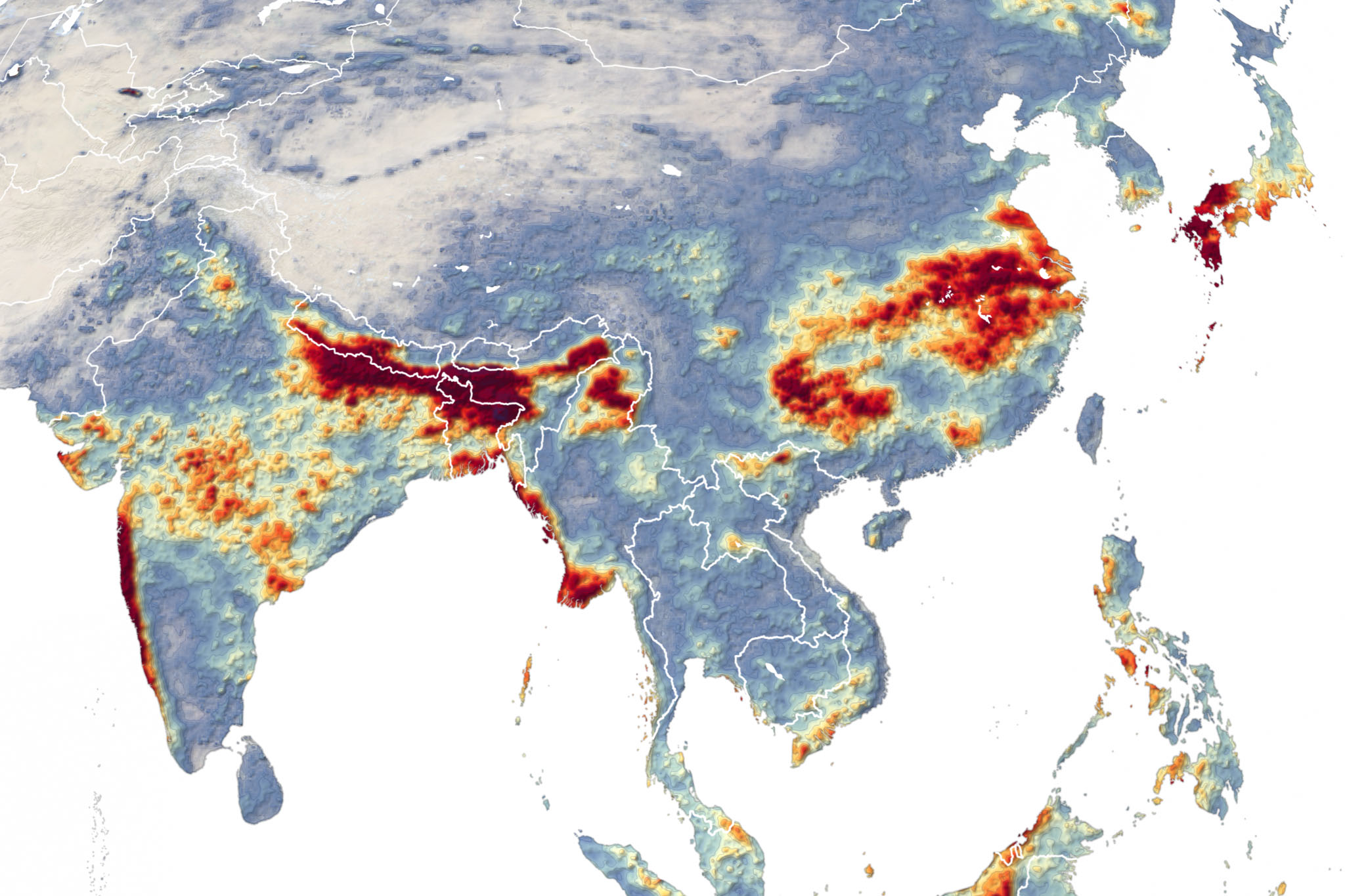
Accumulated monsoon rains during July 2020 over Assam, South and East Asia

During the 2020 monsoon season, particularly high rainfall was experienced across central, north, and northeast India, with 15 centimeters more rainfall than usual by the middle of July. The reason for the excess rainfall is attributed to Madden–Julian oscillation, thereby causing prolonged break-monsoon conditions which decreases the rainfall in North West India and increases it in North East India.

By 21 July, the meteorological subdivision of Assam and Meghalaya had received rainfall of 1,164mm as compared to normal rainfall of 894mm during the period, an excess of nearly 30%. The catchment areas of nearby states, Arunachal Pradesh and Sikkim also received excess rainfall nearly to the tune of 16% and 45% respectively aggravating the flood situation.

Into October 2020, although the situation began to improve with the number of people affected reduced to 135,000 the state was still affected by prolonged flooding, with 315 villages still submerged.

== Damages and potential long term effects ==
Flooding and subsequent landslides have caused damage to bridges, government buildings, roads, embankments and schools. The government has announced funding of 3.46 billion Indian Rupees ($42 million) for repairs and aid to the region. In addition to this aid, the central government, according to then Chief Minister Sarbananda Sonowal, has "committed to passing an ordinance to set up North East Water Management Authority, to address flood and erosion problems" with more permanent solutions as an attempt to stop future monsoon seasons from being so devastating.

Millions of people living in the flooded area rely on crops and livestock to provide for their families. The flooding began just before harvest and has caused destruction to more than 267,203 hectares of crops and more than 45,000 domesticated animals have been forced to flee or be abandoned.

Assam is home to important wildlife sanctuaries and World Heritage sites which have been damaged by the flooding. Pobitora Wildlife Sanctuary has India's highest population of rhinoceroses and at the height of the flooding 90% was impacted by flood waters. Kaziranga National Park has also been affected with more than 150 wild animals rescued and 125 animals, including 12 rhinoceroses have died.

== Relief efforts ==
Leadership in disaster management and relief operations is ensured by the Assam State Disaster Management Authority (ASDMA) in accordance with India's Disaster Management Act of 2005. As of 14 October 2020 a total 627 relief camps and 1662 relief distribution centers were set by up ASDMA, including hygiene and isolation measures for COVID-19 pandemic infected persons. Reduced carrying capacity of relief camps and difficulties in the provisioning of food and safe drinking water have been encountered.

Relief efforts have also been provided by NGOs including Red Cross India who supplied tarpaulin sheets, food and water and relief materials to flood affected communities. In preparation for the annual flooding, Red Cross India increased stocks of aid packages across the state to ensure timely and efficient response to flood affected families. Oxfam India and other NGOs have however called attention to the challenges of COVID-19 and extensive flooding, increasing vulnerabilities of displaced people and minority communities who took refuge on embankments and makeshift shelters.

Post-disaster response by ASDMA includes compensation schemes for homestead losses, infrastructure repair together with an Asian Development Bank and World Bank funded embankment and flood risk reduction program. Despite government efforts in disaster risk reduction, the dual effect of flooding and Covid-19 related job-losses increase distress and poverty of around 70% of the population, whose livelihoods are agriculture dependent and are not eligible for compensation without formal documentation or land rights.

== Health challenges ==
Diseases such as Dengue, Malaria and Japanese Encephalitis are likely to increase in stagnant water left by receding floods. Treatment of these diseases have been hindered by fear of the COVID-19 pandemic and restrictions have hampered the efforts to destroy mosquito breeding sites and awareness-raising among at-risk populations. Resources available to the population have been obstructed due to infrastructure failures, causing difficulties of access for medical professionals.

Government flood reporting dated 14 October 2020 established a total of 149 deaths resulting from floods and landslides. Accidental drowning of children constitutes a reported 44.5% of these deaths caused by children often misjudging the strength of the currents. Women and children are among the most affected by the floods, unable to access clean water and hygiene supplies to prevent the spread of disease.

With over 200,000 COVID-19 cases reported in Assam, the spread of the virus has been exacerbated by the flooding with many not willing to relocate to relief camps thereby affecting relief efforts.

== Lessons learned ==
As a result of the yearly monsoon related destruction, the South Asia Flash Flood Guidance System (South Asia FFGS) was launched on 23 October 2020 by the World Meteorological Organization. The system will strengthen coordination of disaster risk reduction and preparedness in Bangladesh, Bhutan, India, Nepal and Sri Lanka through forecasts and early warnings of dangers related to flash floods with the hope of lessening the loss of life and damage to property.

== See also ==
- Brahmaputra floods
- 2022 Assam floods
- 2020 China floods
