= Taudaijang =

Village in Manipur, India

Taudaijang is a village near Nungba in Noney district of Manipur, India. Taudaijang comes under Nungba post office and the Postal Index Number is 795147.
