= 2022 Manipur landslide =

Landslide in Manipur, Northeast India

- Landslide (Manipur) Landslide (India)
- Date: 30 June 2022
- Time: ≈02:00 IST (UTC+05:30)
- Location: Noney District, Manipur, India
- Type: Landslide
- Deaths: 58
- Injuries: 18
- Missing: 3

A large landslide occurred in Nona district of the Indian state of Manipur near the Tupul railway construction site on the night of 30 June 2022. It killed 58 people and three people were missing. Eighteen people were injured. Twenty-nine Indian Army personnel and 29 civilians were among the deceased. Of the missing three people, two were civilians and one was an Indian Army personnel.

== Landslide ==
The landslide occurred in the district of Noney, at 107 Territorial Army Camp, near the Tupul railway construction site of the Jiribam–Imphal line of Indian Railways. The initial eight confirmed fatalities were members of the Territorial Army. The group acted as security personnel for a railroad construction that would connect Jiribam railway station to Manipur's capital city Imphal. The landslide occurred near the Ijei river where it created a dam. Rescuers believed it could lead to major flooding if the dam gave way, causing a larger disaster. The landslide was attributed to weak soil due to prolonged exposure, rain and human factors. Experts at Manipur University said that nearly all landslides in the region have been caused by the poor lithology—fractured rocks, steep slopes and unstable mass were contributing factors. It was likely that the water-clogged soil liquefied and destabilized, causing the landslide.

== Rescue and recovery ==
The government of Manipur mobilized the National Disaster Response Force and State Disaster Response Force to coordinate rescue missions. Over 250 soldiers, rescuers and police officers were involved. Bulldozers and excavators were used to find bodies in the nearby river. Search and rescue operations by the Assam Rifles and Territorial Army went underway to find between 50 and 72 missing individuals. Twenty-three to 43 of the missing were Territorial Army soldiers.

By July 2, the bodies of 34 people were recovered. At least 28 people remained missing. Nineteen people were rescued, including 13 Territorial Army soldiers and five civilians. Rescuers said the search for more people would continue into the night. The injured were taken to the Noney Army Medical unit for treatment.

By July 3, the total death toll was 42, while another 20 remained missing. At least 27 were members of the Territorial Army, and 15 civilians were among those killed. Unfavourable weather conditions and new landslides further complicated the efforts. Rockslides were reported during rescue operations. Rescuers used radar and a search and rescue dog to locate potential survivors that were buried. Works were also ongoing to remove debris blocking the Ijei river to empty a landslide-dammed lake.

By July 20, the total death toll reached 56, with five people still missing. The deceased included 29 Indian Army personnel and 27 civilians. On 20 July 2022, the rescue operation was officially called off with five bodies still missing.

On 23 July 2022, two more bodies were recovered from the landslide site by local people with the help of the Indian Railways authority, three days after the search operation was officially called off.

== Response ==
Officials warned residents in Noney district against approaching the Ijei river due to the possibility of a flood. The Chief Ministers of Manipur, N. Biren Singh, said that ₹500 thousand would be given to the families of those killed as an ex gratia, while ₹50 thousand would be given to the injured. Travellers were told to avoid National Highway 37.

On 20 July 2022, a memorandum of understanding (MoU) was signed between Northeast Frontier Railways, Noney district administration, and Makhuam village authority. As per the MoU, a joint survey would be carried out by the three sides on the extent of damage caused by the incident and the estimate shall be submitted to the Railways for compensation. Indian Railways would also carry out extensive discussions with institutions such as IIT Guwahati and Manipur University so that railway projects on hilly terrain in the state can be better monitored for early warning to prevent such incidents in the future.

== See also ==
- 2022 India–Bangladesh floods
