= Sandeep Nangal Ambian =

Indian-British kabaddi player (c. 1983–2022)

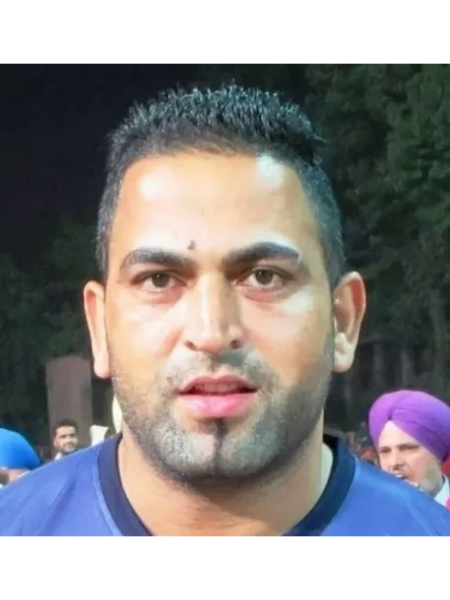

Personal information
- Nationality: Indian-British
- Born: c. 1983 Nangal Ambian Khurd, Shahkot, Punjab, India
- Died: 14 March 2022 (aged 38) Mallian Khurd, Punjab, India
- Height: 6 ft 1 in (185 cm)
- Weight: 105 kg (231 lb)

Sport
- Country: India
- Sport: kabaddi
- Position: stopper
- League: major league kabaddi
- Club: Shahkot Lions
- Team: India national kabaddi team

Sandeep Singh Sandhu also popularly known as Sandeep Nangal Ambian or Gladiator (c. 1983 – 14 March 2022) was a British-Indian kabaddi player who played in the position of a stopper. He had represented both India and the United Kingdom in international kabaddi matches. He also captained both India and UK kabaddi teams. He settled in West Brom, UK in around 2007. Sandeep was also well known for his efforts to eradicate drug menace and the issue of drug intake among youth through sports.

He had started his career playing state-level matches and was known as 'Gladiator'

== Biography ==
He hailed from Nangal Ambian village in Shahkot and he apparently received the stage name Nangal Ambian indicating the place of his birth.

== Career ==
He started his playing career by playing state level matches before becoming a pro. He had competed in various kabaddi leagues in United Kingdom, New Zealand, United States and Australia.

He captained the Singhs team in the inaugural edition of the World Kabaddi League in 2014 and under his captaincy, Singhs emerged as the champions after a hard fought battle by defeating favorites Khalsa Warriors 58-55 in an evenly poised contest that went down to the wire. He also won the player of the final award during the final of the 2014 World Kabaddi League tournament for his all-round display. In 2016 season Sandeep played for Bhagat Singh Abbotsford Kabaddi Club as part of a legendary stop line that went on to win a record of eight out of ten tournaments in BC.

He served as the President of the Major League Kabaddi Federation as well as the President of the Shahkot Lions Kabaddi Cup.

He was also one of the prominent key organisers of the langar hosted by the state's sportspersons for farmers at Singhu border in New Delhi. In 2021, he visited New Delhi to participate in the farmers' agitation.

== Death ==
He was assassinated on 14 March 2022 in Mallian Khurd, outside Jalalandar, in Punjab by unidentified gunmen when he was on a family trip from UK to his native country India to watch a kabaddi tournament at his hometown. He was reportedly shot dead at around 6pm while watching a local friendly kabaddi match as part of the Kabaddi Cup. However, the Indian Express claims that he was supposed to participate in a match just moments prior to his death and the shooting happened when Sandeep came out of the tournament site. It was revealed that around 20 rounds of bullets were fired on his head and chest.

It is believed that his murder might be linked with a possible dispute between him and the club members ever since he took charge as President of Major League Kabaddi Federation. However, few others believe he was murdered by a drug mafia in order to silence and prevent him from keeping the sport clean from drugs or could be dispute with any gangsters group
