= Tupul railway station =

Railway station in India

Tupul

General information
- Location: Imphal Jiri National Highway, Tupul, Manipur; India
- Coordinates: 24.804°N 93.674°E
- Elevation: 591 metres (1,939 ft)
- System: Indian Railways station
- Owner: Indian Railways
- Operator: Northeast Frontier Railway
- Line: Jiribam–Imphal railway line
- Platforms: 1
- Tracks: 2

Construction
- Structure type: Standard (on-ground station)
- Parking: No
- Cycle facilities: No

Other information
- Status: Under-construction
- Station code: TUPUL
- Zone(s): Northeast Frontier Railway
- Division(s): Lumding

History
- Opened: TBA
Location

Tupul railway station is an under-construction railway station at the adjoining area between Noney and Kangpokpi districts, Manipur. Its code is TUPUL. It will serve the Tupul village. The station proposal includes two platforms. The station will serve as a major station on Jiribam–Imphal railway line. The Work on this rail line is expected to be finished in the year 2024 according to latest updates.
