= Subbu Arumugam =

Indian musician and writer (1928–2022)

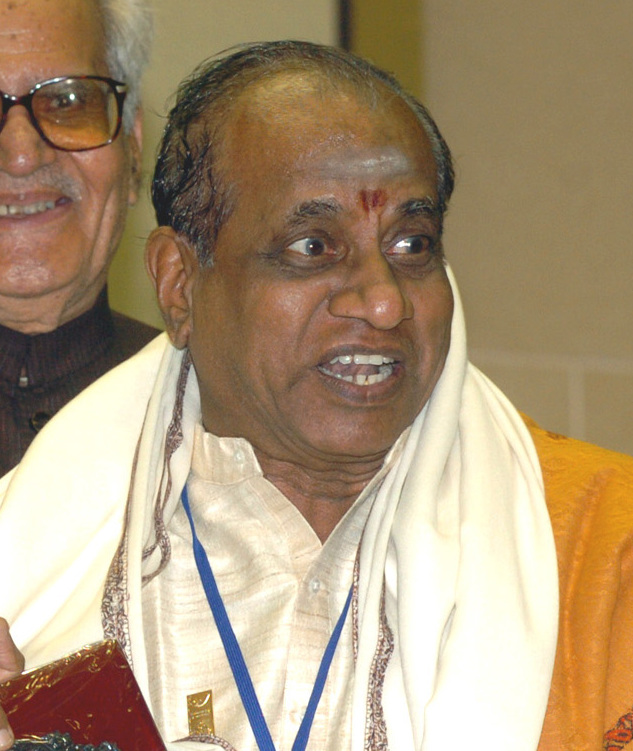
- Arumugam in 2006
- Born: 12 July 1928; Chatthiram Pudukulam, Tirunelveli, Madras Province, British India
- Died: 10 October 2022 (aged 94); Chennai, Tamil Nadu, India
- Occupations: Musician, Writer
- Awards: Padma Shri (2021); Sangeet Natak Akademi Award, Kalaimamani (1975)

Subbu Arumugam (12 July 1928 – 10 October 2022) was an Indian musician, writer and Villupattu theatre art exponent. In 2021, he was awarded India's fourth-highest civilian award the Padma Shri in the Arts and Literature category. He published 15 books containing Villu Pattu narratives, songs, short stories and novels such as Veera Pandia Kattabomman. Some of his published notable works are Noolaga Villisai, Ramayanam, and Villisai Mahabharatham.

Arumugam was born on 12 July 1928 at Chatthiram Pudukulam village of Tirunelveli district in Tamil Nadu, India. He received training in the Villu Paatu theatre art under A. Subbaiah Pillai, N. Krishna Pillai, and N. S. Krishnan. Arumugam had many Villu Pattu audio cassettes, videos, and devotional songs to his credit. Some of his other notable works include Kannile Nalla Gunam, a video on diabetic retinopathy, which was produced by Sankara Nethralaya, Chennai, and Sattam, Sathyam, Samudhyam, a video on legal matters, was produced by the Government of Tamil Nadu. He has also written comedy tracks, dialogues and lyrics for various films in India.

Arumugam performed Villu Paatu professionally from the 1930s up to the 1950s in various temples, schools, colleges, factories, corporate offices and media broadcasts.

Arumugam was awarded the Kalaimamani title in 1975 by the Tamil Nadu Eyal Isai Nataka Manram for excellence in the field of art and literature. Subbu Arumugam was honored with the Sangeet Natak Akademi Award for his contribution to the practice of Villu Paatu.

== Awards and recognition ==
- Padma Shri by the Government of India, 2021
- Sangeet Natak Akademi Award by the Sangeet Natak Akademi
- Kalaimamani Award by the Tamil Nadu Eyal Isai Nataka Manram, 1975
