= 2018 North East Olympic Games =

Multi-sport event in Imphal, Manipur, India

- Venue: Manipur
- Location: Imphal
- Date: 24 October 2018; 28 October 2018
- Teams: 8

Champion
- Manipur

The 2018 North East Olympic Games were the first edition of North East Games. It was held in Manipur in October 2018.

Organized by the Manipur Olympic Association in association with the Northeast Olympic Association, the championship served as a launchpad for players to demonstrate and refine their abilities in multiple sports disciplines.

== Disciplines ==
This was the first edition of the games, inaugurated with 12 disciplines, including athletics, archery, badminton, boxing, football, judo, karate-do, shooting, table tennis, taekwondo, weightlifting, and wushu.

More than 2000 athletes from eight states of north-east India took part.

== Results ==
Manipur was the overall champion, followed by Assam and Arunachal Pradesh.

Medal tally
Rank	Team	Gold	Silver	Bronze	Total
1	Manipur	80	48	31	159
2	Assam	46	53	41	140
3	Arunachal Pradesh	18	20	38	76
4	Mizoram	8	15	29	52
5	Nagaland	6	9	26	41
6	Meghalaya	3	8	29	40
7	Sikkim	1	6	18	25
8	Tripura	0	3	17	20
Total		162	162	229	553
