= 2022 Srinagar bombing =

Terrorist attack

- Part of the Kashmir conflict
- Location: Srinagar, Indian-administered Jammu and Kashmir
- Date: 6 March 2022 (4 years ago)
- Weapon: Grenade
- Deaths: 2
- Injuries: 24

On 6 March 2022, a militant threw a grenade at a marketplace in Srinagar, Indian-administered Jammu and Kashmir, injuring twenty-four people and killing two.

The attack occurred at a market in Hari Singh High Street near the Amira Kadal bridge at around 4:20 P.M. The street was very busy and a large number of people were in the marketplace when the bombing struck. The terrorist threw a grenade at security forces, injuring dozens of people, including at least one policeman.

Later that day, 60-year old Muhammad Aslam Makdhoomi from Nowhatta succumbed to his injuries. 19-year old Rafiya Jan died the following day.

The bombing received widespread condemnation in India, including from Manoj Sinha, Farooq and Omar Abdullah, Mehbooba Mufti, the Jammu Kashmir Pradesh Congress Committee, the Bharatiya Janata Party, and many more.
