= Lukhambi =

Coordinates: 24°54′N 93°37′E

Lukhambi is a village in Tamenglong district of Manipur, India.

== See also ==
- Tamenglong district
