= A. Gopalakrishnan =

Indian nuclear engineer (1937–2022)

A. Gopalakrishnan (1937 – 11 October 2022) was an Indian nuclear engineer who was the chairman of the Atomic Energy Regulatory Board (1993–1996). He was a well-known figure in the field of nuclear power, nuclear safety and nuclear non-proliferation.

Born in the British Raj, Gopalakrishnan was the Chairman of the Drafting Committee of the International Convention on Nuclear Energy convened by the IAEA in 1993. He was notable for his strong criticisms against Indian Government's move to sign the INDO -US Nuclear agreement in 2010. Gopalakrishnan was a strong opponent of the Indian Atomic Energy Commission's steps to set up nuclear power plants at Jaitapur and Koodankulam by using foreign technology and imported nuclear plants.
