= 2022 Bhadohi fire =

Fire in Uttar Pradesh, India

Bhadohi fire
- Date: 2 October 2022
- Time: 9:30 p.m. IST
- Venue: a Durga Puja Pandal in Narthuwa village
- Location: Bhadohi district, Uttar Pradesh
- Cause: halogen light overheated causing fire
- Deaths: 17
- Injuries: 75

On 2 October 2022, a fire occurred at a Durga Puja pandal (temporary structure for worship) in Narthuwa village in Bhadohi district of the Indian state of Uttar Pradesh. Seventeen people died and at least 75 people were injured in the incident. The investigation revealed that the decorative fiber polythene sheets had caught fire due to heat caused by halogen lights. The incident occurred around 9:30 pm (IST), during the celebration of Saptami or the seventh day of Navaratri, an annual Hindu festival observed in honour of the Hindu goddess Durga. Around 150 to 300 people or more were present at the venue when the incident took place.

== Investigation ==
On October 4, a Special Investigation Team (SIT) was constituted to investigate the incident.

As per the police investigation, a fire broke out when a halogen light overheated, generating an electric wire to catch fire. An FIR was registered against the concerned puja committee, Bal Ekta Club Durga Puja Samiti and organizers, who were found negligent in taking the required safety measures while organizing the event.

== Fundraising ==
Financial help is being given to the victims admitted to the hospitals. On an appeal of the District Magistrate of Bhadohi district, public representatives, officers, employees and individuals provided financial aid of more than ₹10 lakh rupees through Red Cross Society. Bhadohi MLA Zahid Beg contributed five lakhs from the MLA fund. On the other hand, MLA from Aurai Dinanath Bhaskar has given ₹ 1 lakh from his salary.

As of October 13, 2022, the district administration of Bhadohi collected donations of over ₹30 Lakh rupees through fundraising.

== Response ==
The Chief Minister of Uttar Pradesh state Yogi Adityanath expressed his condolences over the loss of life. DM Bhadohi Gaurang Rathi and Superintendent of Police Anil Kumar expressed condolences to the deceased.
