= 2022 Manipur Olympic Games =

Manipur Olympic Games 2022 (Meitei: ə.ni su.bə mə.ni.pur o.lim.pik mə.sān.nə) at the Manipur Olympic Games
- Nongin, Manipur's state bird, as the official mascot of the "Manipur Olympic Games 2022"
- Venues: 16 venues in Manipur including: Imphal Polo Ground (Mapal Kangjeibung); Khuman Lampak Main Stadium; Takmu Water Sports Complex; IGAR South Mantripukhri Ground; and many others
- Location: Imphal, Manipur, India
- Date: 26 August 2022 - 30 August 2022 (5 days)
- Competitors: 6000 sportspersons, 34-sports discipline games from India nations
- Website: manipurolympicassociation.org

Medalists
gold medal	103
silver medal	96
bronze medal	70

Champions
- 269

The Manipur Olympic Games 2022, also known as the 2nd Manipur Olympic Games (Meitei: ə.ni su.bə mə.ni.pur o.lim.pik mə.sān.nə), is a multi-sport event, held in Manipur, Northeast India. The previous event, which was also the first event, was organised in the year 1988. After a long gap of 34 years, the 2nd edition of the Manipur Olympic Games was organised in the year 2022.

The 2nd Manipur Olympic Games was organised under the aegis of "Manipur Olympic Association" (MOA) in association with the Department of Youth Affairs and Sports, Government of Manipur. The Manipur Olympic Games 2022 is also serving as the selection process of the upcoming 36th National Games in Gujarat and the "North East Olympic Games 2022" in Meghalaya.

The sport event was organised by the Government of Manipur led by Chief Minister Nongthombam Biren Singh, in association with "War on Drugs" campaign.

Manipur's Chief Minister Nongthombam Biren Singh announced that the "Manipur Olympic Games" will be christened as "Manipur State Games" from next year 2023 and necessary budget allocation will be made by Manipur Government.

The Imphal West district secured the first place as the overall team champion in the Manipur Olympic Games 2022, followed by the Imphal East district and the Bishnupur district in the second and the third places. Among the hill districts of Manipur, Senapati district topped the medal tally, followed by Ukhrul district. Kamjong district, Noney district and Pherzawl district failed to secure a single medal in the event.

== Official Mascot ==
Manipur's chief minister Nongthombam Biren Singh while taking arrangements for the "Manipur Olympic Games 2022", unveiled the official mascot of the event to be Nongin (Mrs. Hume's pheasant), the state bird of Manipur. The Government of Manipur, under the leadership of Chief Minister Biren, considering the importance of the preservation of the bird and for creating awareness among the public of Manipur, Nongin was officially adopted as the mascot of the sports event.

== Opening ceremony ==
On 26th August 2022, the Manipur Olympic Games 2022 was inaugurated by La Ganesan, the Governor of Manipur at the Mapal Kangjeibung (Imphal Polo Ground), the world's oldest polo ground, in Imphal. During the grand opening ceremony, Governor La Ganesan said:

“Youths, who are highly disciplined, physically fit, mentally alert, spiritually sound and loyal to the country are needed at this juncture, much more than any other time in the past.
If the athletes and sportsperson of the state are provided with proper facilities, Manipur will emerge as excellent sportspersons of national and international stature.”

During the grand ceremony, Nongthombam Biren Singh, the Chief Minister of Manipur said that sports represent a very important place in multi ethnic Manipur, as religion or caste are absent in sports. The event is planned to organise in a festive mood with showcases of many cultural programmes from next year. State Ministers including Thongam Biswajit Singh, Govindas Konthoujam, Khashim Vashum and many MLAs also attended the opening ceremony. The Governor raised the flag of "Manipur Olympic Association" for the declaration of the opening ceremony. Naorem Roshibina Devi, a Wushu player, took oath of all the participating districts of Manipur. Art and cultural programmes like Thang-Ta, choreographic show titled "Colour of Oneness" as well as theme song musical performance mainly highlighted the grand opening ceremony.

Chief Minister Biren Singh announced a reward of ₹ 50,000 to the contingent of players of Ukhrul district appreciating their performance in the parade.

== Sports ==
- Archery
- Athletics
- Badminton
- Basketball
- Boxing
- Cycling
- Equestrian
- Fencing
- Football
- Gymnastics
- High jump
- Hurdles
- Judo
- Kho kho
- Long jump
- Mukna
- Netball
- Polo
- Shooting
- Shot put
- Swimming
- Taekwondo
- Table tennis
- Volleyball
- Weightlifting
- Wrestling
- Wushu

== Medal summary ==
The following is a district wise medal tally of the Manipur Olympic Games 2022.

Ranks (Note: Some specific ranks are shared by different teams.)	Districts	Gold	Silver	Bronze	Total
1	Imphal West	103	96	10	209
2	Imphal East	99	84	89	272
3	Bishnupur	65	31	40	136
4	Thoubal	18	43	45	106
5	Kakching	15	31	35	81
6	Senapati	6	4	10	20
7	Ukhrul	1	4	14	19
8	Jiribam	1	0	9	10
9	Churachandpur	0	4	4	8
10	Chandel	0	1	4	5
10	Tamenglong	0	1	4	5
11	Tengnoupal	0	1	2	3
11	Kangpokpi	0	1	2	3
12	Kamjong	0	0	0	0
12	Noney	0	0	0	0
12	Pherzawl	0	0	0	0

== See also ==
- India at the Olympics
- Indian Olympic Association
- National Games of India
