= Mal river accident =

Disaster in Jalpaiguri which occurred on 5 October 2022

- Date: 5 October 2022
- Location: Malbazar, Jalpaiguri district, West Bengal, India; 26.8686475°N 88.7528905°E
- Deaths: 8
- Injuries: 13

On 5 October 2022 at 8 PM (IST), on the day of Vijaya Dashami, suddenly a flood came in the Mal river in Malbazar, West Bengal, India during the immersion during Durga Puja.

== Background ==
On 5 October 2022 at 8 PM (IST), suddenly a flood came in the Mal river in Malbazar, West Bengal, India during the immersion during Durga Puja. Following which, 8 people died and many people injured. Also, some of the people went missing after the accident.

== Aftermath ==
Following the accident, Prime Minister Narendra Modi and Chief Minister Mamata Banerjee expressed condolences on the death of people and announced the ex-gratia of Rs. 2 lakh to the family of the people who died.
