= Kabui Khullen =

Village in Tamenglong district, Manipur, India

- Village
- Location in Manipur, India Kabui Khullen (India)
- Coordinates: 24°54′25″N 93°34′50″E
- Country: India
- State: Manipur
- District: Tamenglong
- Subdivision: Tamenglong

Government
  - Type: Panchayati raj (India)
  - Body: Gram panchayat

Population (2011)
  - Total: 997

Language
  - Official: Meitei, Inpui (Kabui Naga)
- Time zone: UTC+5:30 (IST)
- PIN: 795159
- Vehicle registration: MN

Kabui Khullen is a village in the Tamenglong subdivision of Tamenglong district, in the northeastern Indian state of Manipur.

== Demographics ==
According to the 2011 Census of India:

- Population: 997 (512 males, 485 females); sex ratio: 947 females per 1,000 males
- Children (0–6 yrs): 133 (13.3%); child sex ratio: 622
- Literacy rate: approximately 46.1% (male: 47.9%, female: 44.2%)
- Number of households: 206
- Almost the entire population belongs to the Scheduled Tribe (Inpui/Kabui Naga) community.

== Geography and location ==
Kabui Khullen is located in the eastern part of Tamenglong subdivision, approximately 13 km from Tamenglong town.

The nearest highway is NH‑53, and the village falls under the Tamenglong Assembly constituency (Constituency No. 53) and the Outer Manipur Lok Sabha constituency. During the 2016 Imphal earthquake, 80% of the village's houses were damaged.

== Government and economy ==
The village is administered under the Panchayati Raj system by a locally elected sarpanch.

Agriculture, especially jhum (slash-and-burn) cultivation, forms the primary occupation in the region.

== Education ==
Kabui Khullen has a government-run primary school. For secondary education, students typically travel to Tamenglong town for middle and higher secondary schooling.

== Culture ==
The village is primarily inhabited by the Inpui (Kabui) Naga tribe, speaking the Inpui dialect and practicing traditions preserved through oral storytelling.

== See also ==
- Tamenglong district
- Inpui people
