= Sharad Hazare =

Indian cricketer (1945–2022)

Personal information
- Full name: Sharad Kaluram Hazare
- Born: 8 August 1945; Bombay, India
- Died: 8 August 2022 (aged 77); Andheri, Mumbai, Maharashtra, India
- Batting: Right-handed
- Role: Wicket-keeper

Domestic team information
- Years: Team
- 1964/65–1976/77: Bombay

Career statistics
Competition	First-class
Matches	44
Runs scored	438
Batting average	12.16
100s/50s	0/0
Top score	33
Catches/stumpings	81/29
- Source: Cricinfo, 10 August 2022

Sharad Kaluram Hazare (8 August 1945 – 8 August 2022) was an Indian cricketer who played first-class cricket for Bombay between 1965 and 1976.

Hazare was a wicket-keeper and lower-order batsman. He played for Bombay in six Ranji Trophy finals, all of which Bombay won. He had a reputation for standing up to the stumps even to the opening bowlers, and made several stumpings off the bowling of the Bombay paceman Abdul Ismail. He made his highest score of 33 batting at number nine against Baroda in 1971–72, top-scoring in Bombay’s first innings.
