= Nungba =

Nungba Lwangba
- Town
- Location in Manipur, India Nungba (India)
- Coordinates: 24°45′25″N 93°25′00″E
- Country: India
- State: Manipur
- District: Tamenglong

Area
  - Total: 1.2 km^{2} (0.46 sq mi)
- Elevation: 400 m (1,300 ft)
  - Density: 120/km^{2} (310/sq mi)

Languages
  - Official: Rongmei, Manipuri, English, Hindi
- Time zone: UTC+5:30 (IST)
- PIN: 795147
- Telephone code: 03877
- Nearest city: Imphal
- Nearest Airport: Tulihal International Airport Imphal
- Literacy: 74% (Approx)
- Constituency: Nungba
- Climate: Temperate and calm (Köppen)
- Avg. summer temperature: 30 °C (86 °F)
- Avg. winter temperature: 12 °C (54 °F)
- Website: nungba.nic.in/welcome.asp

Nungba (originally "Lwangba") is a small town surrounded by low-lying hill ranges and rivers, an extension of the eastern Indian Himalayas. The highest point of Nungba "Ramphaan But" which means "Viewpoint" stands high at the centre of the town.

Nungba is also the administrative Headquarters of Nungba Sub-Division, Tamenglong District, Manipur State, India.

Nungba has a number of educational institutions including, Nungba Government High School, St. John English High School, and Maranatha Academy. It also houses Nungba Government Hospital(Community Health Center) and clinics.

Nungba Bazar is famous for King Chilly (The World's Hottest Chilly), local oranges, wild herbs and fermented bamboo shoots.

It is connected by roadways (NH 53 Passing through Nungba from Imphal to Jiri). The nearest railway station is Khongsang which is 19 km from Nungba.

== Demographics ==
=== Population ===
According to the 2011 Census, Nungba has a population of approximately 2200 from more than 350 households. The latest awaited Census report for 2015-16 is expected for more growth. Inhabitant here is Rongmei Naga Tribe. "Rongmei" is the main spoken language followed by English, Manipuri and Hindi.

=== Religion ===
The whole population of Nungba practices Christianity (Baptist, Presbyterian, Roman Catholic, Seventh Day Adventist, Assembly of Yahweh).

== Administration/Office ==
Sub-Divisional Magistrate, Sub-Divisional Police Officer, Post Master, and Chief Medical Officer functions from their respective offices headquartered in Nungba.

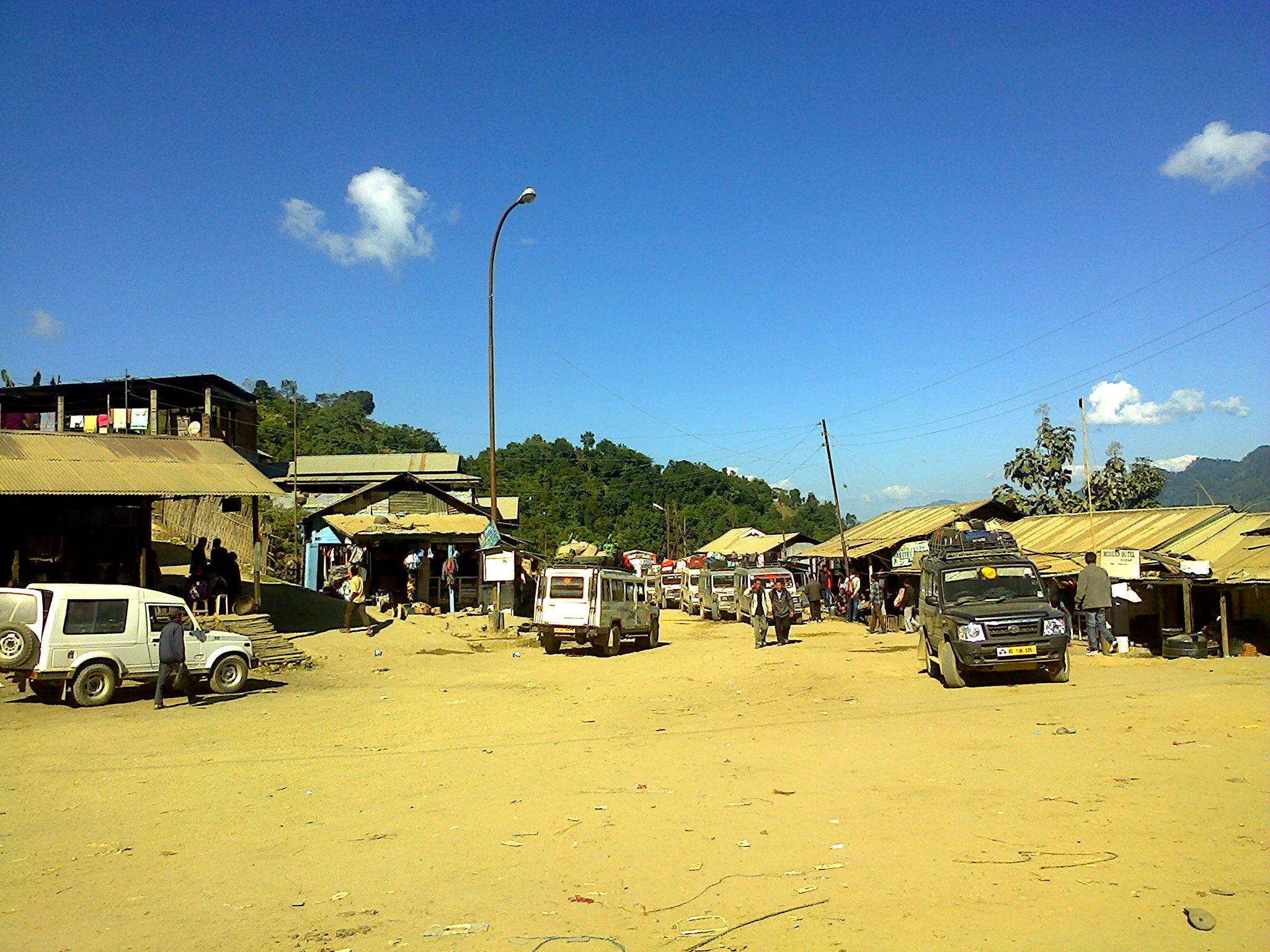
Nungba Town

== Geography ==
Nungba is located on the eastern end of the Indian Himalayas with an area of approximately 120 Sq. km. It lies in India's highest Seismicity zone V. The latest seismic activity of 6.7 magnitude was recorded on the early morning of 3 January 2016, with an epicenter 50 km from Nungba.

=== Physiography ===
Hills and rivers mark the boundary of Nungba. It is marked by a steep slope at the East and gently elongated more towards the West and South.

Nungba is closely surrounded by several other small hill towns namely - Rwangdai, Rengpang, Taodaijang, Mukti, Namgaylung(known as Mukti naa), Tajeikaiphun and Puiluan. The rivers that flow out and surround Nungba include river Lemga, Khatha, Thingdingluangthuak and Luangphai. Other rivers that mark as natural boundaries include Alang (Irang), and Agu (Barak).

== Climate ==
Nungba has a sub-tropical highland climate. It experiences pleasant and comfortable climatic conditions throughout the year with temperatures ranging between 5-20 degree Celsius during winter and 15-30 degrees Celsius during summer. The scenic town spreads along several hillocks.

=== Rainfall ===
Nungba town receives approx. 1100 millimeters annually. The rain bearing South West Monsoon brings a shower from the month of April/May till August/September, a boon for agriculture.

Monsoon season is accompanied by frequent landslides along National Highway 53 hindering the flow of traffic sometimes.

== Flora and fauna ==
The forest reserves in Nungba offer the local populace to practice a Jhum (Shifting) cultivation. The primary agricultural product includes Rice, Colocasia roots, Hot Red King Chilly, Maize, Cucumber, Lady Fingers, Mustards, Cabbage, Beans and other vegetables. Different kinds of fruits grown and produces include Orange, Lemon, Banana, Grapes, Mango, Pine apples, Berries etc.

The huge forest includes Bamboo, Oaks and other large tropical trees which in turn provide fresh water, fresh air and other forest resources. The forest woods are also used as fuel for the kitchen.

Different Animals and Birds includes Tiger (hardly spotted) Bear, Wild dogs, Wild Pigs, Deer, Monkey, Squirrel, Bulbul, Sparrow, Parrot, Crow, Eagle etc. The fresh river water is blessed with a variety of fishes whose names are locally known.

Nungba is located at an elevation of 400 m from MSL.

== Economy ==
More than 70% engaged in Agricultural activities. While the remaining 30% are engaged in Govt. Sectors and other private commercial activities. Taudaijang is a nearby village.

The latest discovery of Fossil Fuels in and around Nungba promises better economic conditions.

== Location / Connectivity ==
Located in Tamenglong District, National Highway 37 passes through Nungba. It is 110 km from Imphal (Capital City of Manipur). The nearest Railway station, Khongsang, is just 19 km from Nungba.

The nearest Airport is Tulihal International Airport Imphal, 110 km away from Nungba.
