= 2022 India–Bangladesh floods =

Natural disaster in northeastern India and Bangladesh

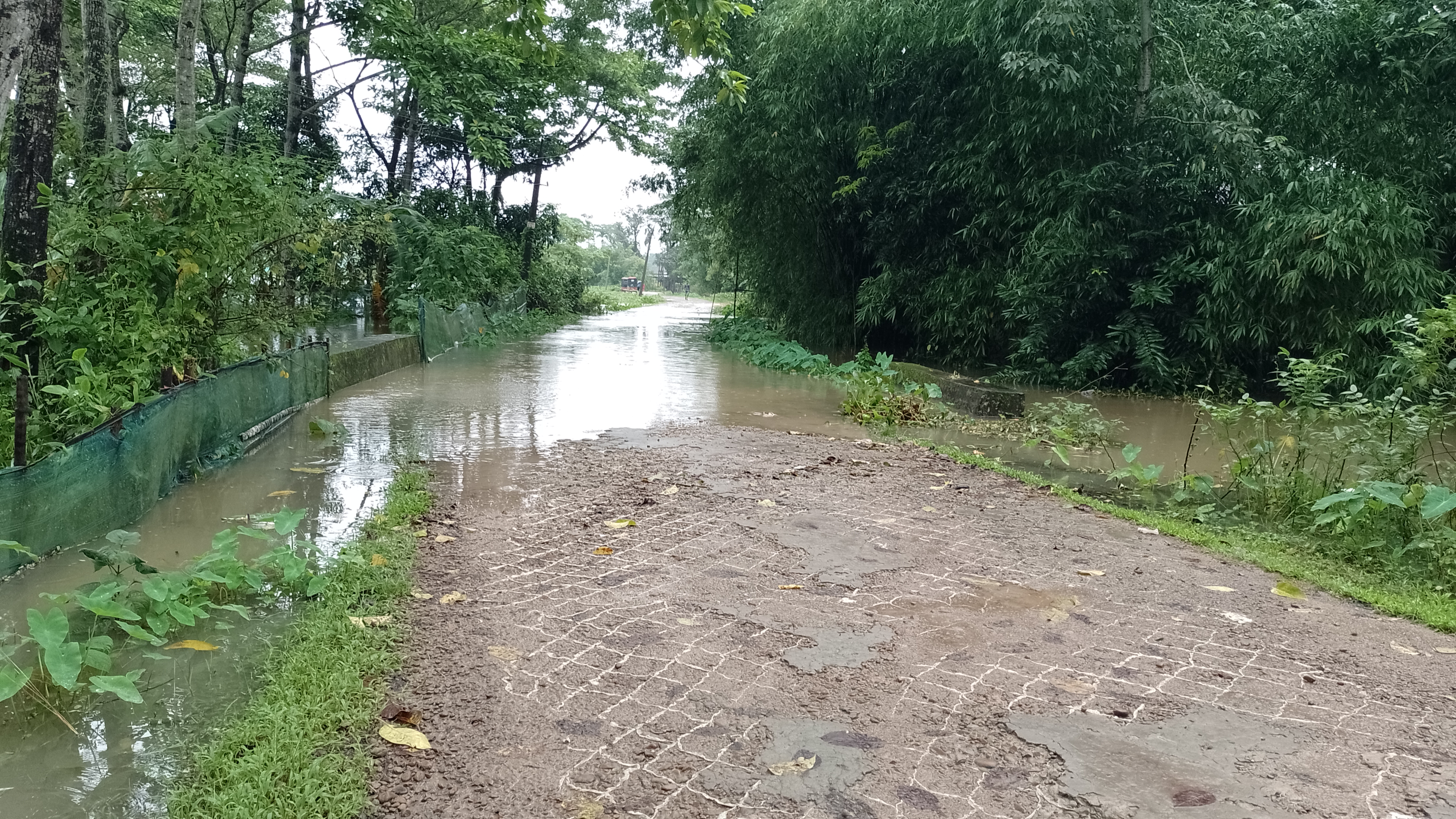
- Road affected by flood in a village of Assam
- Date: 23 May 2022–October 2022
- Location: India (Assam, Meghalaya, Arunachal Pradesh, Tripura): Bangladesh (Sylhet, Mymensingh, Rangpur, Rajshahi divisions)
- Cause: Heavy monsoon rains
- Deaths: 318: India: 177; Bangladesh: 141
- Property damage: India: 4,000+ villages; 113,000 hectares of crop area; Bangladesh: 53,000 hectares of crop area

Beginning in May 2022, deadly floods hit northeastern India and Bangladesh. Over 9 million people in both countries have been affected, and around 300 people were killed.

As of 22 June 2022, millions of people across the affected areas are reported to be in urgent need of food and medicine.

== Background ==
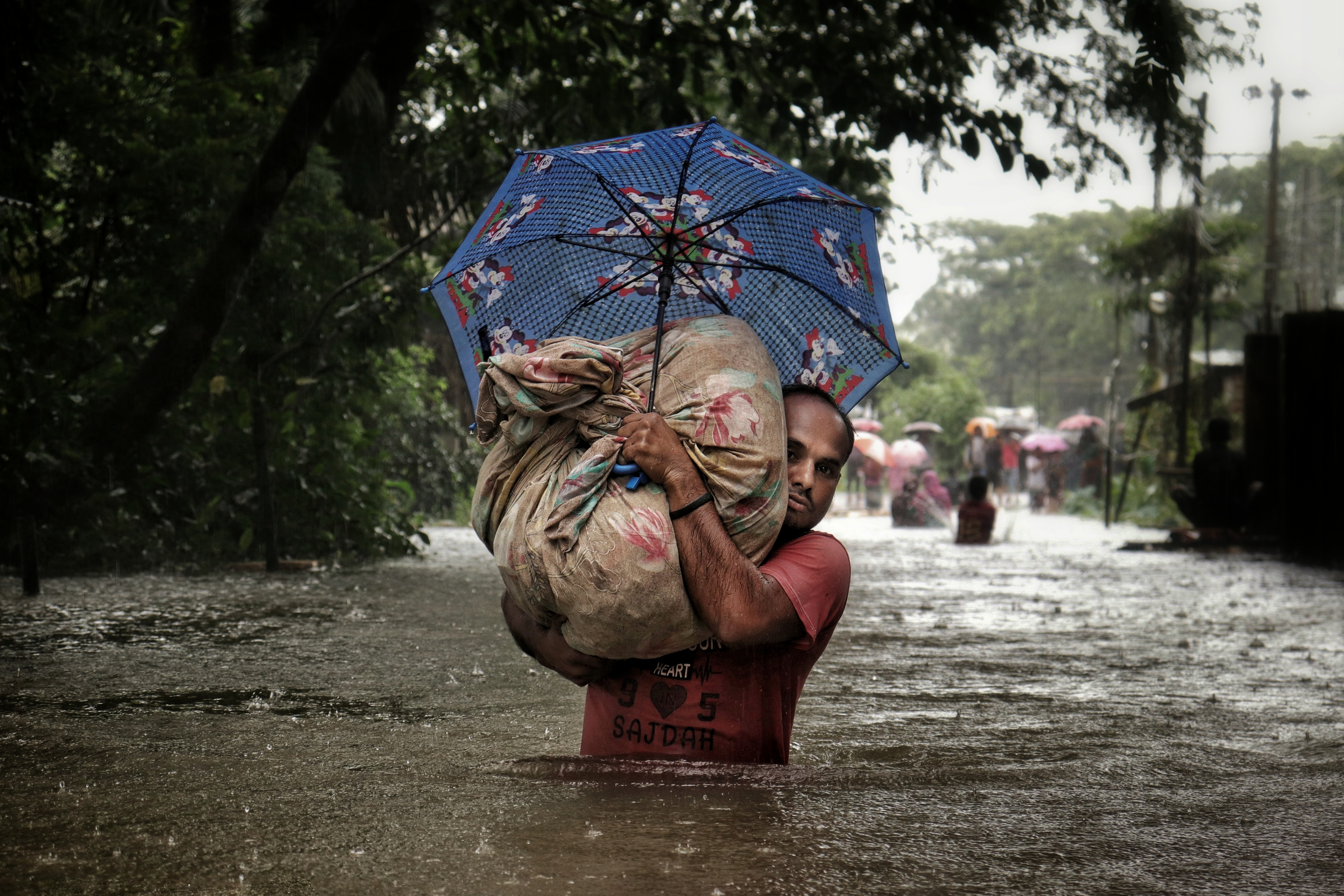
A victim moving their belongings to a safe place during June 2022 Sylhet flood.

Bangladesh and northeastern India, especially Assam, are mainly flat floodplains with numerous rivers flowing across them, the most prominent of which are the Ganga (called Padma in Bangladesh) and Brahmaputra (called Jamuna in Bangladesh). Other major river systems in the region include the Barak-Surma-Kushiyara river system, which flows through northeastern Bangladesh and the Barak Valley of Assam. Due to the large volumes of water coming from the Himalayas and the heavy monsoon rains, flooding is a regular occurrence in this region. At the time of the floods, a La Nina event was active in the Pacific meaning India and Bangladesh would receive heavier monsoon showers. Beginning in May 2022, deadly floods hit northeastern India and Bangladesh. Over 9 million people in both countries have been affected, and around 150 have been killed. Millions of people across the affected areas are reported to be in urgent need of food and medicine.

Around 40% of Assam's area is a flood plain, which is also roughly 10% of India's total flood-prone area. According to ISRO, nearly 30% of Assam's land area have been flooded at least once from 1998 to 2015. Heavy rainfall and settling of sediments plays a major role in rising the water level of the Brahmaputra river and its tributaries. Also, according to a survey, the Brahmaputra have widening yearly due to erosion, which also makes the flooding worse.

== Events ==
=== India ===
==== Assam Floods ====
Assam Floods 2022
- Date: 6 April 2022 to October 2022
- Deaths: 197
- Property damage: ~ ₹1,000 crore, ~$ 1.2 Billion Damage to 108,308 Hectares of Crop land.

Assam Floods 2022 ( অসমীয়া (Assamese) : - অসমৰ বানপানী ২০২২) is one of the worst floods ever seen in Assam in the decade which lasted for almost 7 Months ( From April 2022 to October 2022 ) in a series of waves.

The main causes for the floods are the Pre-Monsson rains which were started from 6 April 2022 across the state and the Monsoon Season there after.

In total around 5.6 million people got affected, 4.7 million people got displaced, Crop land of 108,308 Hectares got damaged, 3,660,173 animals got affected and 32 districts in the state : - Bajali, Baksa, Barpeta, Biswanath, Bongaigaon, Cachar, Chirang, Darrang, Dhemaji, Dhubri, Dibrugarh, Dima Hasao, Goalpara, Golaghat, Hailakandi, Hojai, Kamrup, Kamrup (Metro), Karbi Anglong, West Karbi Anglong , Karimganj, Kokrajhar, Lakhimpur, Majuli, Morigaon, Nagaon, Nalbari, Sivasagar, Sonitpur, South Salmara, Tamulpur, Tinsukia and Udalguri got affected by the floods.

===== Impact =====
The first wave of the floods, caused by the excessive rains in May 2022, due to which flooding was seen in 27 districts. Soil erosion happened in large scale across various places in the state. Around 670,000 people got affected by the first wave.

The second wave of the floods, which lasted from June 2022 to September 2022, due to "Monsoon season", caused the Brahmaputra, Barak and other major rivers in the state to overflow which eroded the river banks and also the houses present their. Around 1,100 houses got completely destroyed and 7,000 houses got partially damaged. Landslides were also observed in 6 districts: - Dima Hasao, Goalpara, Kamrup, Kamrup (Metro), Morigaon and Cachar. Over 90,000 people got affected in the second wave of the floods.

The third wave of the floods, the last wave, in October 2022, caused the low-lying areas near the riverbanks to get flooded with rainwater and again extensive erosion was observed. Around 70,000 people got affected in the third wave.

Several Japanese encephalitis cases were reported across the state during the floods which raised the fear of spread of Water Borne Diseases across the state.

Assam's second largest city, Silchar, have been inundated for six days.

Railway lines were also affected due to flooding and landslides.

===== Rescue Operations =====
In response to the floods, the Union Government of India made an Inter Ministerial Central Team (IMCT) which visited the flood hit areas two times, 26 May 2022 to 29 May 2022 and 30 June 2022 to 3 July 2022 respectively and conducted surveys to estimate the losses caused by the flood. The Union Government after that dispatched a financial aid of ₹648.48 crore to Assam Government to provide shelter to those who lost their homes in the floods.

The Indian Arm Forces, National Disaster Response Force (NDRF) and State Disaster Response Force of Assam (SDRF) started conducting relief and rescue operations from June 2022.

The International Federation of Red Cross and Red Crescent (IFRC) allocated 621,547 CHF (Swiss Franc) to the Indian Red Cross Society (IRCS) to conduct relief operations and distribute relief materials like food, water, mosquito nets, hygienic kits etc. In total, over 4,075 relief camps and 5,802 relief distribution centers were established.

==== Others ====
Another spurt of heavy rains hit the state in June. By 17 June 2022, it was reported that 20 people had been killed in floods and landslides in Assam and 18 in Meghalaya. The hill stations of Cherrapunji and Mawsynram recorded their highest rainfall since the 1940s. In Arunachal Pradesh, heavy rains and landslides have affected many districts across the state and have killed one and resulted in three missing.

In Tripura, flooding in several rivers has caused 12,000 people to leave their homes.

As of 21 June, the death toll increased above 130 in northeast India. 18% of Kaziranga National Park have been submerged. More than 6 lakh people have been affected in Meghalaya.

18 people have died in Arunachal Pradesh.

In August, at least 36 people died in floods in Himachal Pradesh. Four people were killed and 13 were missing in the neighbouring state of Uttarakhand.

=== Bangladesh ===
In Bangladesh, floods from the Barak and Kushiyara rivers have mainly impacted the northeastern Sylhet and Sunamganj districts and as of 20 June have killed over 32 people. The floods have submerged over 53,000 hectares of agricultural land, damaging the crops. After the area was submerged in water, many fish could be seen floating from the flooded ponds and reservoirs. Due to the floods, the teaching activities of 640 educational institutions in Sylhet have been disrupted. In Sylhet district 55 unions were completely and 15 unions were partially flooded. On 22 May, it was reported that the flood situation in Sylhet had not changed much. There is a shortage of clean water in the flood-hit areas. Dams in different areas are weakened by severe floods. In June, at least 500 villages in different parts of Sylhet district were damaged and at least four lakh people were stranded. Power supply has been cut off in Sylhet and Sunamganj districts. As of June 18, the flood situation in the Sylhet region has further deteriorated.

The Bangladesh Army is working to help with the second phase of flood situation of Sylhet in June. Secondary School Certificate exams to be held in the country have been cancelled due to deteriorating flood situation. Operations at Osmani International Airport and Sylhet railway station have been suspended due to flood waters entering the airport and station area.

In northern Bangladesh, the Teesta and Jamuna have both risen, flooding large parts of Lalmonirhat and Kurigram districts.

On 20 June, Reuters reported that the flooding had stranded over nine million people, including 45 lakh in Bangladesh and 47 lakh in Assam.

== See also ==
- 2020 Assam floods
- 2012 Assam floods
- 2022 Manipur landslide
- 2024 India-Bangladesh floods
