= North East Games =

Multi-sport event held in Northeast India

- Current season, competition or edition: 2026 North East Games
- Formerly: North East Olympic Games
- Game: Multi-sport event
- First season: 2018 North East Olympic Games

Locations
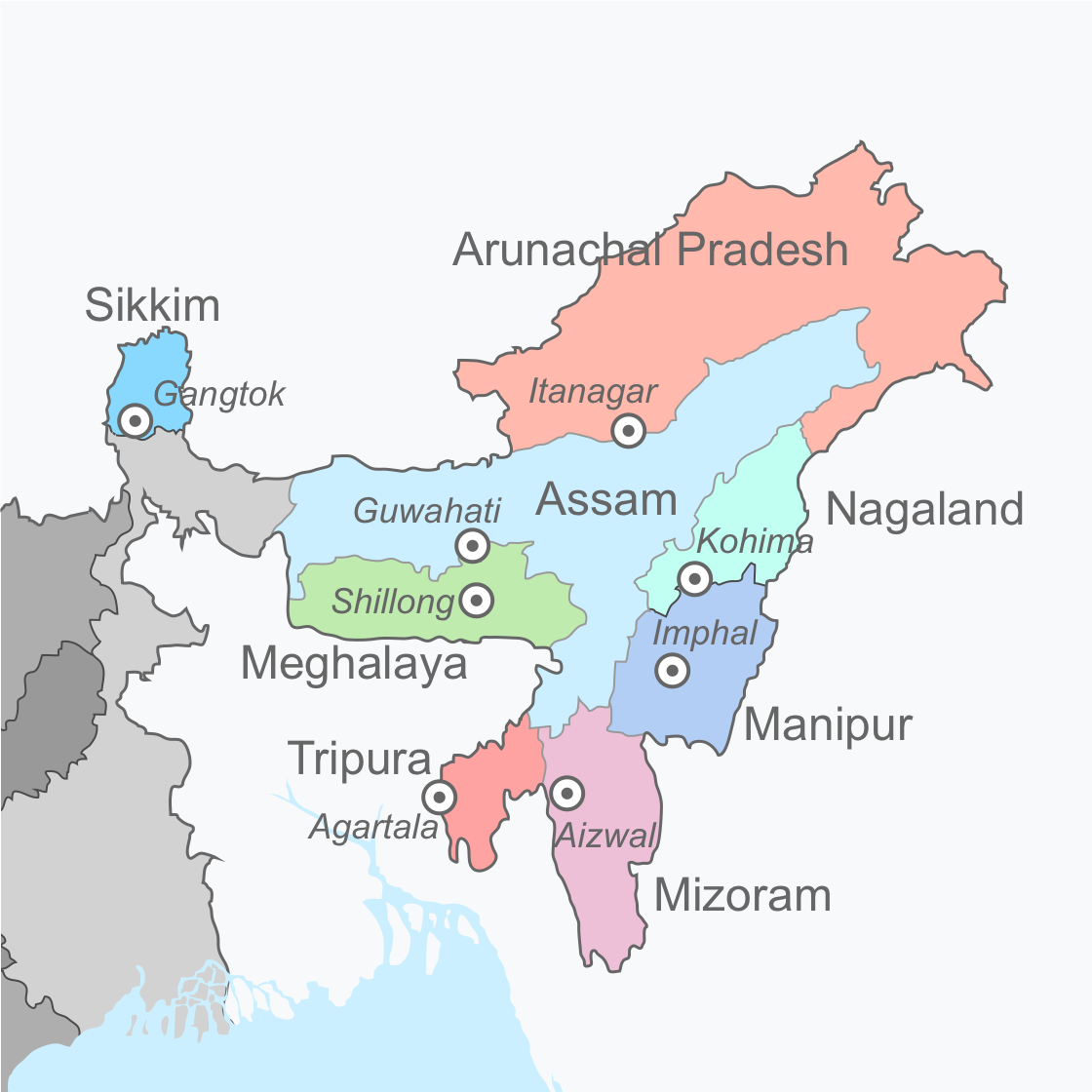

The North East Games formerly known as North East Olympic Games (NEOG) are a Multi-sport event held in Northeast India. The eight states of the region compete in each edition.

Manipur became the champion in the three consecutive years of the 2018, 2022 and 2024 Northeast Games.

Manipur has won the most medals in the first two editions. In third edition, Assam won most medals and Manipur was declared overall champion as they bagged most gold medals.

== History ==
Initially this tournament was named as North East Olympic Games after the governing body, North East Olympic Association, but in 2024, the Indian Olympic Association directed the North East Olympic Committee to remove the "Olympic" tag from its name as that was a registered trademark under the Olympic Charter.

In May 2025, it was announced that Khelo India will develop an annual North-East Games competition under its brand.

== List of Editions ==
Year	Edition	Host	Start date	End date	Winner
2018	1st	Manipur	24 October	28 October	Manipur
2022	2nd	Meghalaya	30 October	6 November	Manipur
2024	3rd	Nagaland	18 March	23 March	Manipur
2026	4th	Arunachal Pradesh	12 October	18 October	TBD

== See also ==
- 2022 North East Olympic Games
- Manipur at the North East Games
- Manipur Olympic Games
