= Noney district =

- District of Manipur
- Location in Manipur
- Coordinates: 24.8°N 93.6°E
- Country: India
- State: Manipur
- Headquarters: Noney

Area
  - Total: 1,438 km^{2} (555 sq mi)
  - Rank: 9

Population
  - Total: 52,509
  - Density: 36.52/km^{2} (94.57/sq mi)

Language(s)
  - Official: Meitei (Manipuri) and English (Note: Meitei language (officially known as Manipuri language) is the official language of Manipur. Other regional languages of different places in Manipur may either be predominantly spoken or not in their respective places but "Meitei" is always officially used.)
  - Regional: Rongmei
- Time zone: UTC+05:30 (IST)
- Website: https://noney.nic.in/

Noney district (Meitei pronunciation: /nō-né/ (Note: Meitei language (officially known as Manipuri language) is the official language of Manipur. Other regional languages of different places in Manipur may either be predominantly spoken or not in their respective places but "Meitei" is always officially used.)) is a district in Manipur, India, created by bifurcating erstwhile Tamenglong district.

The district headquarters is located in Longmai.

== Sub-divisions ==
The following are the sub-divisions in Noney district:

- Longmai
- Nungba
- Khoupum
- Haochong

== Geography ==
Khoupum Valley lies on the center of the Noney district. The area of Khoupum Valley is around 6 sq km. It is the second largest valley in Manipur after the central Imphal valley. The mean altitude above sea level of these valley is 710m.

Irang River flows through the district. At the south-west border of the district Irang River merges into Barak River.

== Demographics ==
Majority of the residents are ethnic Rongmei Naga and with a large Inpui Naga minority in Haochong subdivision.

As per 2011 census Rongmei language is the most commonly spoken language with few Inpui, Chiru, Thadou and Gangte speakers.

== See also ==
- List of populated places in Noney district
