= Manipur at the North East Games =

Sports team delegation

Manipur is one of the eight states of India that competes in the North East Games.

== History ==
Manipur first competed at the 2018 North East Olympic Games. The team's 159 medals (80 gold, 48 silver, 31 bronze) were the most medals in that edition of the Games.

In 2022, Manipur would defend their title as champion of the games, winning a total of 237 medals (85 gold, 76 silver, 77 bronze).

At the 2024 North East Olympic Games, Manipur would win for a third consecutive time. Winning a total of 132 medals (53 gold, 38 silver, 41 bronze).

== Medal table ==
Year	Gold	Silver	Bronze	Total
2018	80	48	31	159
2022	85	76	77	237
2024	53	38	41	132
Total	218	162	149	529
