= Noney =

Noney Longmai
- town
- Location within Manipur Location within India
- Coordinates: 24.7842°N 93.6035°E
- Country: India
- State: Manipur
- District: Noney district
- Elevation: 41 m (135 ft)

Language(s)
  - Official: Meitei (officially called Manipuri) (Note: Meitei language (officially known as Manipuri language) is the official language of Manipur. Other regional languages of different places in Manipur may either be predominantly spoken or not in their respective places but "Meitei" is always officially used.)
  - Regional: Rongmei
- Time zone: UTC+5:30 (IST)
- Postal code: 795159

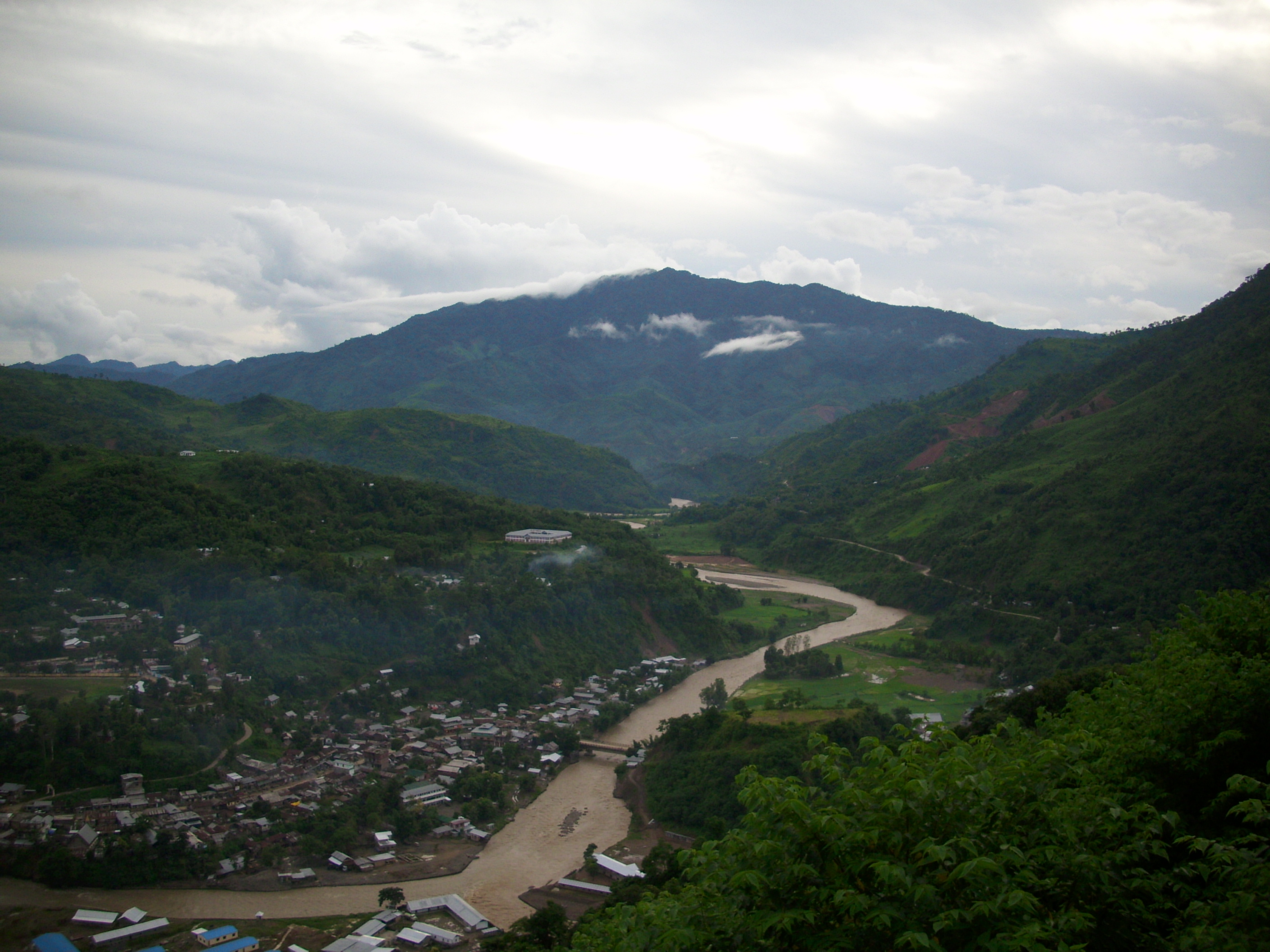
Noney during the rainy season

Noney (Meitei pronunciation: /nō-né/ (Note: Meitei language (officially known as Manipuri language) is the official language of Manipur. Other regional languages of different places in Manipur may either be predominantly spoken or not in their respective places but "Meitei" is always officially used.)), also known as Longmai, is a town located in the western part of Manipur, India. It is 63 kilometres (39 mi) west of Imphal, the capital of the state of Manipur. Its population is almost entirely made up of Rongmei Naga. Previously known as a village, recently has been declared as one of the new district headquarters of Manipur and is separated from the existing Tamenglong District and now comprises Haochong, Khoupum, Nungba and the Longmai subdivision.

Though the area is often known by the name "Noney" leaders of the land preferred the name "Longmai". Which mean, Luang-range and mai-widow (the widow ranges) derive from its geographical features. Despite the vast land they have, their great, great-grandfathers started their life in a place called Napthiat Lauboot (located inside Longmai) usually known by the name "Number 1" or old Longmai village. A place situated on top of the mountain, approximately 2.3 km away from Noney bazaar. People don't live there anymore, but it is remembered and preserved till today in respect of their elders who had lived there. Elders would tell stories of being there and how people slowly, bit by bit move downward, toward the river Aga Duithuak (Aga river), until finally they completely vacate the old place. They all moved out of the old place, but all of them didn't settle in one area. Some moved further downward, some closer to the old place. Due to this settlement, the village got divided into 6 parts. The parts are usually known by numbers. The number assigned to the parts and their names are as follows:

Longmai 1: PLZ/Gangbangbut

Longmai 2: Longmai 2

Longmai 3: Longmai 3,

Longmai 4: Peaceland.

Longmai 5: Namthan,

Longmai Bazaar,

Spring valley,

Happy colony

The old Longmai village is known as Number 1 but when the last group of people living in the old village moved downward below Number 2, the new place is also known by the name "Number 1". In the list above the Number 1 is the new place below number 2. The lowest or the settlement nearest to the river Aga is the present bazaar area. People from all over Longmai and from nearby villages such as Khumji, Nungtek, Makhuam would come down to this place to sell their agricultural goods. For the last few years, many people from nearby villages come here, not only for commercial purposes but also for education and medical purposes.

== Demographics ==
=== Population ===
Noney town is inhabited mostly by Rongmei tribe with a total of 635 households. According to the 2011 Census of India, the village has a population of 3,854 people of which 2,141 are males and 1,714 are females. The average sex ratio is 801 females to 1000 males, which is lower than the Manipur state average. In the village, children 6 years of age or younger account for 11.83% of the total population. Child sex ratio for Noney, as per the 2011 census, is 861 females to 1000 males, which is lower than the state average.

=== Literacy ===
Noney has a higher literacy rate than Manipur as a whole. In 2011, the literacy rate of Noney was 86.90% compared to 76.94% for Manipur. Male literacy was 93.40%, while female literacy rate was 78.71%.

=== Tribe ===
In Noney, most of the population belongs to Scheduled Tribe. These constitute 60.69%, while Scheduled Castes account for 0.13% of the total population.

=== Work ===
Out of the total population of 3,854 people, 1,873 are engaged in work activities. 62.15% of workers describe their work as "main work" (employment or earnings for more than six months) while 37.85% are involved in marginal activities (providing a livelihood for less than 6 months). Out of the 1,873 workers engaged in "main work", 425 are cultivators (as owners or co-owners), while 5 are agricultural workers.

== Administration ==
As per the Constitution of India and the Panchyati Raj Act, Noney is administrated by the Sarpanch ("Village head") who is the elected representative of the village. Even though Noney is often described as a village, it has recently grown into a town due to the immigration of people from different parts of the district. Noney is also declared as one of the new Districts in 2016. Its temperature is slightly higher compared to other places in Manipur because of the clearing of hills for the development of a railway track and sub-station.

== Politics ==
The Nationalist Congress Party, the Indian National Congress, the Naga People's Front, the Manipur State Congress Party, and the Bharatiya Janata Party are the major political parties in this area.

== Connectivity ==
The construction of the world's tallest railway bridge, measured by height of its pillars, began on 28 July 2014 near Noney. The tallest pillar will be 141 metres (463 ft), with others ranging between 50-90m. This will surpass the existing tallest bridge, being the Mala Rijeka Viaduct on the Belgrade–Bar railway line in Europe, where the height of the pillars is 139 metres (456 ft). The bridge will lie on the Jiribam – Tupul – Imphal line.
