= 2022 North East Olympic Games =

Multi-sport event in Shillong, Meghalaya, India

- Venue: Shillong, Meghalaya
- Start date: 30 October 2022
- End date: 6 November 2022

The 2022 North East Olympic Games (2022 NEOG) were the second edition of North East Olympic Games. Over 3,000 athletes participated in 18 Olympic disciplines.

Manipur won the most medals at the event, with 237 medals, and 85 of them being gold medals.

== History ==
The 2022 NEOG was to be held in Arunachal Pradesh in 2020, but was postponed due to the COVID-19 pandemic. The 2022 NEOG was meant in part to commemorate the 50th year of host state Meghalaya's statehood.

== Disciplines ==
The disciplines contested were archery, athletics, badminton, basketball, boxing, football, judo, karate, shooting, swimming, table tennis, taekwondo, tennis, wushu, cycling (Mountain Bike), golf, weightlifting and wrestling.

== Results ==
Medal tally
Rank	Team	Gold	Silver	Bronze	Total
1	Manipur	88	75	77	240
2	Assam	79	61	63	203
3	Arunachal Pradesh	39	36	37	112
4	Meghalaya	36	35	78	149
5	Nagaland	18	17	43	78
6	Mizoram	16	30	60	106
7	Tripura	4	11	27	42
8	Sikkim	3	16	31	50
Total		283	281	416	980
