= List of populated places in Kangpokpi district =

Villages in Kangpokpi district of Manipur, India

The Kangpokpi district of Manipur state in India has 9 subdivisions. It was created in 2016: at the time of the 2011 Census of India, it was a part of the Senapati district.

== Blocks ==
The Kangpokpi district has 9 subdivisions or Tribal Development (T.D.) blocks:

- Kangpokpi
- Saikul
- Saitu Gamphazol
- Tujang Waichong
- Champhai
- Kangchup Geljang
- Bungte Chiru
- Island
- Lhungtin

At the time of the 2011 census of India, the area of the district was part of three subdivisions of the Senapati district.

Name	Population	Effective literacy rate	Sex ratio	SC population %	ST population %	Census code (2011)
Sadar Hills West (now sub-divided into Kangpokpi, Saitu Gamphazol, Tujang Waichong, and Champhai)	71844	73.15%	968	0.67%	63.73%	01861
Saitu-Gamphazol (now sub-divided into Kangchup Geljang and Bungte Chiru)	58536	75.49%	896	0.23%	81.8%	01862
Sadar Hills East (now sub-divided into Island, Lhungtin, and Saikul)	63364	73.98%	1009	0.15%	96.05%	01863

== Towns ==
The district has one town:

Name	Type	Block	Population	Effective literacy rate	Sex ratio	SC population %	ST population %	Census code (2011)
Kangpokpi	Census Town	Sadar Hills West	7476	85.12%	1010	0.04%	75.64%	268681

== Villages ==
Following is a list of the villages as per the 2011 census:

=== Sadar Hills West block ===
The Sadar Hills West block is now sub-divided into Kangpokpi, Saitu Gamphazol, Tujang Waichong, and Champhai blocks.

Name	Population	Effective literacy rate	Sex ratio	SC population %	ST population %	Census code (2011)
Bollen	70	70.59%	944	0.0%	100.0%	268543
Khommunom	220	70.59%	849	0.0%	99.55%	268544
Geljang	129	58.12%	897	0.0%	100.0%	268545
Songjang Pakang	487	35.65%	1064	0.0%	100.0%	268546
Kotlen	976	36.34%	791	0.72%	87.5%	268547
Leisang	65	40.0%	1097	0.0%	64.62%	268548
12 Miles It Road	328	45.1%	665	0.0%	0.0%	268549
Holjang	79	32.81%	1079	0.0%	89.87%	268550
Songpijang	433	9.17%	959	0.0%	98.61%	268551
Khollen	37	74.29%	1312	0.0%	100.0%	268552
Paodel Basti	1195	70.56%	969	0.0%	0.0%	268553
Selsi	455	14.29%	1031	0.0%	99.78%	268554
Songjang Phailen	168	34.39%	909	0.0%	100.0%	268555
Thonglang Akutpa	950	85.63%	992	0.0%	77.47%	268556
Thonglang Atongba	429	61.54%	803	0.0%	81.35%	268557
Jhil	247	77.63%	1111	0.0%	0.0%	268558
Kharpani	293	63.49%	866	0.0%	0.0%	268559
Makui Asang	503	79.69%	734	0.0%	0.0%	268560
Maokot	141	45.19%	1136	0.0%	97.87%	268561
Gelnel	1534	93.35%	1043	0.0%	93.61%	268562
T.Waichong	1003	95.09%	974	1.5%	62.01%	268563
Joupi	80	23.08%	1162	0.0%	88.75%	268564
Gelbung	301	27.11%	942	0.0%	98.01%	268565
Dahalthari	144	81.67%	870	0.0%	0.0%	268566
Harup Kuki	109	81.11%	946	0.0%	93.58%	268567
Naibet	421	76.37%	863	0.0%	0.0%	268568
Gorkha Harup	520	82.7%	933	0.0%	0.0%	268569
Timsina	307	61.94%	827	0.0%	0.0%	268570
Makui Mayangkhang	860	44.92%	1053	0.0%	98.37%	268571
Govajang	301	78.54%	1007	0.0%	100.0%	268572
Santing (West)	86	80.0%	1150	0.0%	98.84%	268573
Chalwa	1319	83.09%	1039	0.0%	98.33%	268574
T. Khonomphai	359	63.99%	1137	0.0%	73.82%	268575
N.Teikhang	176	67.61%	1095	0.0%	98.86%	268576
Haimol	239	59.45%	1173	0.0%	99.16%	268577
Phoikon	463	42.43%	1031	0.0%	99.35%	268578
Thardara	435	73.43%	867	96.55%	0.23%	268579
Harup Naga	497	58.1%	957	0.0%	82.09%	268580
Dhori Ghari	193	70.78%	856	0.0%	0.0%	268581
Chuchekhup	641	65.86%	937	0.0%	0.0%	268582
Tahar Basti	384	72.29%	714	0.0%	0.0%	268583
Lamchok	447	70.73%	902	0.0%	0.0%	268584
School Parganda	251	69.85%	887	0.0%	0.0%	268585
Maohing Nepali	1613	71.76%	948	0.0%	0.0%	268586
Ghimithari	542	77.31%	908	0.0%	0.0%	268587
M.Chaljang	664	93.44%	930	0.0%	99.7%	268588
Laloi	327	17.2%	982	0.0%	100.0%	268589
Makui Naga	1616	72.75%	973	0.0%	99.57%	268590
Kolghari	158	56.72%	795	0.0%	0.0%	268591
Thulochor	315	50.18%	921	0.0%	0.0%	268592
Riyar Tahar	194	70.0%	1132	0.0%	0.0%	268593
Manedra	243	72.45%	898	0.0%	0.0%	268594
Harup Khopi	646	70.47%	906	0.0%	0.0%	268595
Maohing Kuki	293	86.48%	980	0.0%	100.0%	268596
Aveil	112	68.42%	931	0.0%	57.14%	268597
Chawangkening	160	75.37%	818	0.0%	91.88%	268598
Haizawl	122	80.67%	906	0.0%	100.0%	268599
Bileijang	140	78.63%	818	0.0%	99.29%	268600
Tapon Naga	331	59.18%	829	0.0%	99.09%	268601
Gorkha Tapon	1082	82.57%	885	0.0%	0.0%	268602
Noonpani	510	36.84%	1000	0.0%	0.0%	268603
Kailenjang	163	61.98%	895	0.61%	98.77%	268604
Laikot	185	89.93%	968	0.0%	89.19%	268605
Langka	594	91.96%	1020	0.0%	94.28%	268606
S.Keithelmanbi	344	58.02%	830	0.0%	99.42%	268607
Natheljang	286	59.79%	1150	0.0%	91.26%	268608
Satikhola	331	57.6%	829	0.0%	0.0%	268609
Santolabari	655	72.57%	915	0.0%	0.0%	268610
Kharkhari	147	70.49%	1070	0.0%	0.0%	268611
Panikheti	166	73.38%	886	0.0%	0.0%	268612
Has Pukhri	284	66.38%	775	0.0%	0.0%	268613
Bajaghara	274	77.37%	815	0.0%	0.0%	268614
Toribari	786	87.66%	975	0.0%	0.0%	268615
Songtun (J)	243	86.13%	1025	0.0%	100.0%	268616
Songpekjang	33	71.88%	1200	0.0%	100.0%	268617
Songpekjang Nepali	397	77.78%	1068	0.0%	0.0%	268618
Taphou Kuki	1270	82.47%	1099	0.0%	84.33%	268619
Maramei	158	69.5%	1135	0.0%	75.32%	268620
Hengbung	1226	64.34%	1033	0.0%	73.74%	268621
Mayangkhang Khunou	478	41.31%	912	0.0%	87.87%	268622
Mayangkhang	848	77.03%	1034	0.0%	79.36%	268623
M.Ningthoupham	1201	77.03%	1049	0.0%	81.02%	268624
T. Khullen	1625	85.17%	953	0.0%	89.05%	268625
N.Changoubung	235	62.82%	926	0.0%	100.0%	268626
Chingloubung	435	45.81%	1197	0.0%	99.77%	268627
Saikotjang	361	55.3%	1099	0.0%	99.72%	268628
Tokpa Naga	171	71.43%	1012	0.0%	97.66%	268629
Jangnom	169	34.23%	878	0.0%	100.0%	268630
Mahabir	233	59.38%	910	0.0%	0.0%	268631
Washangpung	202	40.4%	942	13.37%	86.63%	268632
K. Gamnom	220	49.09%	1037	0.0%	99.55%	268633
Chandraman	166	79.29%	824	0.0%	0.0%	268634
Makuli	178	82.05%	935	0.0%	0.0%	268635
Kharkhola	381	78.61%	934	0.0%	0.0%	268636
Thanamba	405	73.35%	910	0.0%	99.01%	268637
Haipi	965	82.9%	1049	0.0%	94.61%	268638
Lungphou	291	85.02%	1109	0.0%	77.32%	268639
Lungphou Nepali	328	74.72%	864	0.0%	0.0%	268640
S.Changoubung	592	66.45%	1056	0.0%	98.48%	268641
V.Changoubung	162	40.13%	800	0.0%	100.0%	268642
Kholjang	887	83.51%	1021	0.0%	94.36%	268643
P.Khothah	253	83.33%	1057	0.0%	99.21%	268644
S. Khomunnom	259	83.1%	1106	0.0%	97.3%	268645
Ameladara	254	35.53%	984	0.0%	0.0%	268646
Parsain	561	60.93%	996	0.0%	0.0%	268647
Kongpao	348	61.81%	891	0.0%	99.71%	268648
Tumnoupokpi	814	93.09%	985	0.0%	81.57%	268649
Tumuyon Khunou	632	72.38%	1032	0.0%	97.94%	268650
Daili	931	83.83%	952	0.0%	89.04%	268651
Phyapau	711	55.38%	809	0.0%	97.89%	268652
Haijang	361	88.61%	890	0.0%	99.17%	268653
Upper Kalapahar	472	83.84%	808	0.0%	0.0%	268654
Mahika	329	98.74%	838	0.0%	100.0%	268655
Gopibung Kuki	298	59.78%	1113	0.0%	99.66%	268656
Gopibung Nepali	462	78.66%	933	0.0%	0.0%	268657
Liyai Kalapahar	353	64.21%	1040	0.0%	98.87%	268658
Manidara	466	60.3%	902	0.0%	0.0%	268659
Chandmari	318	77.04%	849	0.0%	99.69%	268660
Tokpa Nepali	559	74.51%	948	0.0%	0.0%	268661
Tujang Pt. I	589	78.15%	818	0.0%	95.93%	268662
Tujang Pt. Ii	139	65.67%	853	0.0%	29.5%	268663
Canaanphai	223	68.65%	973	0.0%	100.0%	268664
Paspati	500	83.55%	845	0.0%	0.0%	268665
Jangmol	246	1.03%	952	0.0%	100.0%	268666
Molsang	390	80.06%	866	0.0%	88.72%	268667
S.Jalenmol	246	13.36%	1050	0.0%	100.0%	268668
Lower Kalapahar	1725	82.56%	1027	0.35%	0.06%	268669
Songtun (K)	272	59.74%	1015	0.0%	100.0%	268670
L. Sehjang	56	73.58%	647	0.0%	100.0%	268671
S.Phoibung	243	55.77%	1042	0.0%	97.53%	268672
Lhangnomphai	189	94.84%	783	0.0%	95.24%	268673
Lhangnom	30	61.54%	1000	0.0%	100.0%	268674
S.Molnom	260	76.85%	884	0.0%	94.23%	268675
T.Lhanghoi	485	98.21%	823	0.0%	97.53%	268676
Bolsang	234	96.57%	814	0.0%	99.57%	268677
N. Gamhoi	261	27.63%	1071	0.0%	98.85%	268678
Bongmol	406	92.24%	1126	0.0%	99.26%	268679
Keithelmanbi	4075	89.22%	1075	0.0%	99.19%	268680

=== Saitu-Gamphazol block ===
The Saitu-Gamphazol block is now sub-divided into Kangchup Geljang and Bungte Chiru blocks.

Name	Population	Effective literacy rate	Sex ratio	SC population %	ST population %	Census code (2011)
Haijol	38	50.0%	1533	0.0%	100.0%	268682
Beleijang	0	NA	NA	NA	NA	268683
Phailenkot	202	32.18%	1000	0.0%	98.51%	268684
Thomjang	283	88.98%	1021	0.0%	100.0%	268685
L. Gamngai	63	84.91%	615	0.0%	100.0%	268686
Saitu	242	64.9%	952	0.0%	98.35%	268687
S.Boungpi	140	49.58%	1029	0.0%	100.0%	268688
S.Silen	84	69.86%	867	0.0%	100.0%	268689
S.Lhangnom	64	75.93%	1207	0.0%	100.0%	268690
Kholep	416	58.1%	900	0.0%	99.76%	268691
Bongjol	275	88.28%	1022	0.0%	98.18%	268692
L.Singhol	186	77.84%	979	0.0%	98.39%	268693
Kolpechang Kuki	232	78.74%	1000	0.0%	94.4%	268694
Kolpechang Nepali	165	75.17%	774	0.0%	0.0%	268695
M.Songpi	165	48.65%	793	0.0%	98.18%	268696
S.Chajang	116	65.69%	1035	0.0%	99.14%	268697
K.Songlung	413	74.18%	903	0.0%	100.0%	268698
G.Gelbung	369	61.88%	1027	0.0%	99.19%	268699
Joujang	300	88.69%	935	0.0%	75.0%	268700
G.Thangbuh	111	87.23%	947	0.0%	100.0%	268701
Koubru Leikha	662	76.55%	936	0.0%	0.0%	268702
L.Khomunnom	150	81.06%	923	0.0%	96.67%	268703
Tuipajang	224	62.5%	931	0.0%	99.11%	268704
S.Gamnomjang	24	4.17%	714	0.0%	95.83%	268705
Phoibi	127	20.0%	954	0.0%	100.0%	268706
Motjang	58	79.25%	1231	0.0%	100.0%	268707
S.Buning	153	45.27%	889	0.0%	99.35%	268708
Sipijang	359	78.18%	1176	0.0%	100.0%	268709
Khokheng	237	55.83%	1155	0.0%	98.31%	268710
W.Buning	167	73.28%	1141	0.0%	100.0%	268711
Sapermeina	613	88.09%	1121	1.63%	86.95%	268712
E.Sapermeina	248	68.44%	1255	0.0%	100.0%	268713
U.Sapermeina	300	85.66%	961	0.0%	100.0%	268714
S.Bolen	160	87.32%	1388	0.0%	100.0%	268715
Saitu Sapermeina	317	73.09%	626	0.32%	62.78%	268716
Gamnom Sapermeina	245	80.66%	870	0.0%	100.0%	268717
C.Munnom	108	96.94%	895	0.0%	100.0%	268718
Lhangjol	174	80.15%	776	0.0%	100.0%	268719
G.Phalbung	118	82.47%	1145	0.0%	100.0%	268720
G.Bunglen	108	86.05%	1118	0.0%	100.0%	268721
S. Hengmol	0	NA	NA	NA	NA	268722
Moljol	367	43.56%	995	0.0%	100.0%	268723
Leikot	512	64.82%	1000	0.0%	100.0%	268724
Molnoi	345	60.29%	938	0.0%	99.42%	268725
Simol	165	56.67%	854	0.0%	100.0%	268726
Chalbol	84	73.08%	867	0.0%	100.0%	268727
Pangsang	175	58.24%	944	0.0%	100.0%	268728
Haiken	304	34.07%	842	0.0%	100.0%	268729
N.Khonom	191	45.71%	873	0.0%	100.0%	268730
Thingbongjang	122	80.56%	1033	0.0%	100.0%	268731
Mongjang	84	67.9%	867	0.0%	100.0%	268732
Hengjang	101	65.59%	980	0.0%	100.0%	268733
Phaijang	633	72.85%	1029	0.0%	99.05%	268734
Bethsaida	152	87.22%	1054	0.0%	99.34%	268735
Mongpijang	160	98.36%	928	0.0%	100.0%	268736
Lhangkhichoi	345	81.08%	1078	0.0%	98.55%	268737
A.Songpijang	228	58.67%	854	0.0%	99.12%	268738
Khonomjang	65	81.03%	1241	0.0%	98.46%	268739
N.Songlung	248	65.52%	1157	0.0%	95.56%	268740
Santing	214	97.31%	877	0.0%	99.07%	268741
L.Mangjol	273	96.55%	845	0.0%	97.8%	268742
Pangmol	510	89.84%	1082	0.2%	98.04%	268743
Molthang	130	84.68%	1167	0.0%	99.23%	268744
Siloi	220	89.06%	964	0.0%	76.82%	268745
Motbung Nepali	683	80.74%	919	0.0%	0.0%	268746
Bethany	91	65.88%	1220	0.0%	98.9%	268747
Jampi	32	88.46%	882	0.0%	100.0%	268748
Khochal	67	80.65%	914	0.0%	91.04%	268749
Charhazar	2760	78.58%	966	0.47%	1.01%	268750
Chalbung	291	60.67%	819	0.0%	98.97%	268751
Goungaiphai	54	95.56%	1348	0.0%	98.15%	268752
Bolkot	205	97.13%	898	0.0%	99.51%	268753
Mapao Kanglatongbi	5	50.0%	667	0.0%	100.0%	268754
Phailen	129	93.97%	1016	0.0%	100.0%	268755
K.C.Home	345	89.86%	788	0.29%	93.91%	268756
Laikong Avenue	212	72.78%	1078	0.0%	90.09%	268757
Gamgiphai	243	93.97%	1077	0.0%	91.36%	268758
Kontam	113	91.84%	1093	0.0%	100.0%	268759
Leikhampokpi	177	71.9%	903	0.0%	100.0%	268760
Khengjang	942	88.56%	1013	0.0%	99.47%	268761
K.Lhangnom	161	90.54%	1012	0.0%	93.79%	268762
Makhan	598	86.0%	1027	0.0%	99.33%	268763
Khunkhu Naga	798	66.04%	905	0.0%	54.76%	268764
Khunkhu Kuki	652	68.66%	976	0.77%	82.21%	268765
Hengjang	347	87.02%	1065	4.32%	93.95%	268766
K.Phoibung	503	93.93%	1061	0.0%	99.8%	268767
Motbung	3601	88.51%	994	0.36%	90.5%	268768
Samuk	333	67.49%	994	0.0%	100.0%	268769
Konsa Khul	295	76.36%	867	0.0%	98.98%	268770
Ireng Naga	1038	87.92%	977	0.0%	99.81%	268771
Molhoi	441	84.35%	986	0.0%	98.64%	268772
Ch. Ebenezer	488	80.95%	1025	0.0%	96.93%	268773
P.Molding	1049	85.63%	935	0.0%	68.06%	268774
Leimakhong	3544	95.86%	364	0.68%	25.0%	268775
Leilon Khunou	273	66.82%	950	0.37%	95.97%	268776
Leilon Phoikot	567	74.79%	1054	0.0%	98.06%	268777
Leilon Vaiphei	694	55.01%	1116	0.0%	99.86%	268778
Leilon Phaijang	176	94.48%	1120	0.0%	100.0%	268779
L.Chamchai	171	69.78%	1311	0.0%	97.66%	268780
Haraothel	349	89.37%	1029	0.0%	99.43%	268781
Kharam Thadoi	159	82.61%	963	0.0%	93.71%	268782
Nakhujang	147	85.37%	1014	0.0%	99.32%	268783
Kharam Vaiphei	339	77.24%	982	0.0%	99.12%	268784
Singda Kuki	152	92.25%	949	0.0%	98.03%	268785
Kangchup Geljang	358	88.12%	689	0.0%	80.73%	268786
Songjang Khullen	13	69.23%	1167	0.0%	100.0%	268787
Songjang Waphong	121	43.36%	921	0.0%	100.0%	268788
Waphong Inthan	235	47.37%	958	0.0%	100.0%	268789
Kangchup Songlung	274	48.91%	1141	0.0%	100.0%	268790
Songjang Khunou	196	63.1%	1042	0.0%	99.49%	268791
Kangchup Khomunnom	142	89.09%	732	0.0%	100.0%	268792
Kangchup Patbung	292	96.53%	1086	0.0%	99.66%	268793
Kangchup Tuikon	229	90.67%	957	0.0%	95.63%	268794
Kangchup Joute	88	71.79%	796	0.0%	97.73%	268795
Kangchup Ponlen	168	99.3%	931	0.0%	100.0%	268796
G.Lhangsom	95	68.97%	727	0.0%	100.0%	268797
S. Kajang	107	83.53%	1229	0.0%	100.0%	268798
Kangchup Chingkhong	304	72.96%	987	0.0%	99.34%	268799
Kangchup Patjang	134	87.3%	1161	0.0%	100.0%	268800
Langdeibung	58	94.0%	1231	1.72%	5.17%	268801
Kangchup Makhong	276	90.75%	865	0.0%	97.1%	268802
C.Phailen	167	60.28%	1352	1.8%	95.81%	268803
Kangchup Chiru	565	86.06%	935	0.0%	97.88%	268804
L.Jangnomphai (Veitumkhunou)	176	48.53%	1071	0.0%	100.0%	268805
Natop Boljang	147	36.28%	986	3.4%	95.92%	268806
Natop Kuki	182	77.99%	1022	0.0%	98.9%	268807
Khokhen	387	73.22%	925	0.0%	100.0%	268808
Natop Kabui	60	77.19%	818	0.0%	100.0%	268809
Veitum Khullen	151	56.92%	888	5.96%	94.04%	268810
Kotlen	293	41.96%	940	0.0%	97.27%	268811
Kharam Pallen	414	57.42%	762	0.0%	99.76%	268812
Thangjing Chiru	59	86.36%	1107	0.0%	100.0%	268813
Longa Koireng	457	86.93%	1077	0.0%	99.12%	268814
Thanglong Molbung	129	34.19%	1016	0.0%	100.0%	268815
Pholjang	106	43.18%	1255	0.0%	99.06%	268816
Lhongching	111	50.53%	1018	0.0%	99.1%	268817
Khonglong Kabui	304	68.75%	1111	0.0%	100.0%	268818
Thanglong Kabui	0	NA	NA	NA	NA	268819
New Keithelmanbi	2269	91.09%	366	1.5%	31.95%	268820
Maha Kabui	583	71.88%	997	0.0%	97.08%	268821
Manamjang	352	48.01%	966	0.0%	94.6%	268822
Khoripok	160	43.31%	720	0.0%	100.0%	268823
Haibung	420	93.22%	1000	0.0%	99.29%	268824
S.Laijang	238	83.51%	1017	0.0%	99.58%	268825
T.Laijang	213	88.2%	1088	0.0%	99.06%	268826
Sinam Jonhol	244	39.05%	1000	0.0%	100.0%	268827
Sinam Khaithong	154	54.11%	1053	0.0%	98.7%	268828
Bijang	108	54.32%	964	0.0%	99.07%	268829
Longjang	115	50.0%	1170	0.0%	94.78%	268830
Thingkongjang	64	52.73%	778	0.0%	100.0%	268831
S.Sehjang	273	63.57%	635	0.0%	75.46%	268832
Charoipandongba Kabui	816	54.83%	1040	0.0%	99.63%	268833
Mongbung Tongneh	181	56.93%	1235	0.0%	100.0%	268834
Sadar Joute	160	61.6%	975	0.0%	100.0%	268835
Loibol Khullen	127	72.5%	868	0.0%	100.0%	268836
Sadu Mongsaba Kuki	252	73.4%	1118	0.0%	99.21%	268837
Charoipandongba Chiru	259	61.9%	863	0.0%	99.61%	268838
Waroiching	93	62.82%	898	0.0%	100.0%	268839
Ichum Keirap	590	78.78%	1007	0.0%	99.66%	268840
Tingkai Khunou	285	83.95%	1143	0.0%	99.65%	268841
Tingkai Khullen	195	77.07%	990	0.0%	100.0%	268842
Laimaton Thangbuh	184	65.24%	1022	0.0%	100.0%	268843
Tuikhang Aimol	148	61.42%	973	0.0%	99.32%	268844
Wainem Kabui	282	84.65%	1000	0.0%	97.87%	268845
Nungang Kabui	650	59.54%	1181	0.0%	98.92%	268846
Sadu Monsaba Kabui	0	NA	NA	NA	NA	268847
Bungte Chiru	1172	34.43%	1038	0.0%	97.78%	268848
Joupi	73	23.44%	872	0.0%	100.0%	268849
Parengba	219	52.24%	1047	0.0%	100.0%	268850
Chini Ingkhol	651	49.76%	882	0.0%	99.69%	268851
Wajang Mangkhosum	162	83.59%	976	0.0%	100.0%	268852
Dolang Khunou	1206	63.04%	1027	0.0%	96.35%	268853
Nungsai Chiru	882	78.38%	905	0.11%	97.62%	268854
Bethel	192	81.55%	882	0.0%	100.0%	268855
Namthanjang Rongmei	132	60.94%	970	0.0%	99.24%	268856
L. Hengjol	120	63.11%	1143	0.0%	100.0%	268857
M.Jangnomphai	128	91.51%	1246	0.0%	100.0%	268858
C. Joujang	118	47.22%	662	0.0%	90.68%	268859

=== Sadar Hills East block ===
The Sadar Hills East block is now sub-divided into Island, Lhungtin, and Saikul blocks.

Name	Population	Effective literacy rate	Sex ratio	SC population %	ST population %	Census code (2011)
C.Khullen	127	68.63%	841	0.0%	100.0%	268860
Thingphai	263	70.87%	963	0.0%	94.68%	268861
Jangnoi	684	97.4%	1073	0.15%	98.68%	268862
N.Phailen	176	95.95%	872	0.0%	92.05%	268863
Tingpibung	731	41.08%	1003	0.14%	89.6%	268864
Zalenphai	644	84.8%	1205	0.78%	97.52%	268865
Gangpikon	381	52.17%	896	0.0%	96.06%	268866
Lhangsom	187	89.6%	928	0.0%	100.0%	268867
Gampum	431	92.8%	916	0.0%	96.98%	268868
S.Khonomphai	449	94.22%	903	0.0%	99.78%	268869
T.Gamnom	544	38.51%	922	0.0%	88.42%	268870
Songbem	442	29.71%	1000	0.0%	100.0%	268871
Gallam	295	50.42%	954	0.0%	99.32%	268872
Chonjang	232	34.95%	950	0.0%	74.57%	268873
Phuleijang	264	70.2%	1000	0.0%	100.0%	268874
Phoikon	340	40.68%	1429	0.0%	99.71%	268875
Wapabung	275	83.12%	993	0.0%	84.36%	268876
M.Ngamneh	249	87.89%	1041	0.0%	99.6%	268877
Sonphung	322	67.53%	1077	0.0%	100.0%	268878
Denglen	397	90.91%	937	0.0%	83.12%	268879
Molkon	1359	63.19%	1041	1.55%	65.78%	268880
Waichei	301	54.44%	893	0.0%	91.69%	268881
Naphai	319	77.97%	888	0.0%	97.81%	268882
Ng. Phainom	444	89.2%	1065	0.0%	99.77%	268883
Maojang	352	63.21%	1000	0.0%	99.72%	268884
Songphel Khullen	188	87.01%	1136	0.0%	100.0%	268885
Tengkonphai	276	50.2%	930	0.36%	87.68%	268886
Khayang	81	77.94%	800	0.0%	88.89%	268887
Tusam	359	75.78%	951	0.0%	99.72%	268888
C.Aisan	546	83.81%	929	0.0%	76.01%	268889
Pangjang	620	92.25%	944	0.0%	98.71%	268890
Bunglung	562	94.71%	986	0.0%	79.89%	268891
N.Zilphai	216	97.31%	1000	0.0%	100.0%	268892
Saikul	2767	78.21%	1041	0.0%	98.81%	268893
New Saikul	263	77.78%	1138	0.0%	99.24%	268894
Saijang	461	58.12%	1049	0.0%	97.83%	268895
Ichai Goyang	668	87.52%	1094	0.0%	99.55%	268896
Saikho (Ichai Lamlan)	574	93.33%	959	0.0%	99.65%	268897
Nungka	404	91.61%	980	0.0%	99.26%	268898
T.Goyang	221	59.57%	1210	0.0%	89.14%	268899
Thangkanphai	1105	63.75%	1024	4.98%	90.05%	268900
Makokching	505	91.81%	1078	0.0%	98.61%	268901
Moljol	134	96.33%	696	0.0%	100.0%	268902
H. Jangnom	173	96.99%	922	0.0%	99.42%	268903
Phaijang	192	84.46%	1043	0.0%	97.4%	268904
Sadu Koireng	218	83.58%	1247	0.0%	95.87%	268905
A.Longa Koireng	96	85.9%	959	0.0%	98.96%	268906
Utonglok	252	84.79%	1049	0.0%	97.62%	268907
H.Gelmol	166	81.56%	1338	0.0%	90.96%	268908
Belei	318	86.45%	963	0.0%	100.0%	268909
Holbung	116	40.59%	1231	0.0%	100.0%	268910
Old Boljang	144	95.33%	1057	0.0%	100.0%	268911
New Boljang	198	59.49%	980	0.0%	100.0%	268912
Satang Kuki	361	89.17%	842	0.0%	99.17%	268913
Changsang	90	90.0%	800	0.0%	100.0%	268914
E.Mullam	286	71.71%	1014	0.0%	75.87%	268915
Ekouphai	101	87.1%	980	0.0%	100.0%	268916
Y.Langkhong	552	45.78%	957	0.0%	97.83%	268917
Thangal Surung	460	62.26%	983	0.0%	64.13%	268918
Thangkan Thanglunpa	339	68.44%	1055	0.0%	99.41%	268919
Lamkajang	61	63.27%	1103	0.0%	100.0%	268920
Dimjang	68	56.6%	943	0.0%	100.0%	268921
Ankhumbung	182	86.58%	1000	0.0%	99.45%	268922
Twichamphai	167	82.39%	1088	0.0%	100.0%	268923
Lhungjang	281	84.58%	873	0.0%	98.22%	268924
N.Chaljang	247	74.87%	960	0.0%	99.6%	268925
A.Tuisomjang	168	66.43%	1333	0.0%	98.81%	268926
S.Mongbung	737	85.28%	992	0.0%	99.19%	268927
S.Bolkot	154	87.88%	1200	0.0%	99.35%	268928
Molvom (Heinoupokpi)	150	79.2%	923	0.0%	100.0%	268929
L.Haibung	98	82.95%	1042	0.0%	100.0%	268930
Khouchangbung	97	88.16%	1064	0.0%	100.0%	268931
L.Layang	52	36.73%	857	0.0%	100.0%	268932
Gunphaijang	431	70.21%	1062	0.0%	100.0%	268933
Molkot	65	86.79%	1097	0.0%	100.0%	268934
Chalkot	111	81.19%	682	0.0%	100.0%	268935
Luwang Sangol	625	89.11%	984	0.0%	95.04%	268936
Phaileng	136	66.67%	1092	0.0%	94.85%	268937
Ekpan Chingkha	108	48.24%	964	0.0%	97.22%	268938
A. Geljang	174	98.67%	1023	0.0%	98.85%	268939
Thingsat	114	96.81%	1375	0.0%	100.0%	268940
Mapao Khullen	259	74.37%	1123	0.0%	99.61%	268941
Mapao Thangal	137	68.03%	957	0.0%	98.54%	268942
Mapao Christian	614	88.81%	1013	0.0%	97.72%	268943
Khongnangpokpi	330	75.44%	988	0.0%	98.48%	268944
Sijang & Sijang Molcham	319	58.39%	945	0.0%	99.06%	268945
Mongyang	75	36.07%	1143	0.0%	100.0%	268946
Lhangjol	22	64.71%	833	0.0%	100.0%	268947
S.Jangnomphai	150	67.83%	1113	0.0%	98.0%	268948
Dongsum	633	78.85%	901	0.0%	93.52%	268949
Leplen	599	77.03%	914	0.0%	73.96%	268950
B.Khayang	96	83.87%	778	0.0%	100.0%	268951
B.Bolyang	204	66.47%	1000	0.0%	99.02%	268952
Tuisomjang	366	62.66%	1068	0.0%	99.18%	268953
Chahmol	153	41.89%	1186	0.0%	100.0%	268954
Khongbal Kuki	258	40.79%	985	0.0%	99.61%	268955
K.Nomjang	138	50.83%	1190	0.0%	92.75%	268956
Simol	268	51.59%	887	0.0%	99.25%	268957
K.Khonom	160	49.61%	1025	0.0%	98.12%	268958
Samusong (Chahmol)	256	45.13%	1081	0.0%	97.66%	268959
Urangpat	314	84.98%	938	0.0%	99.68%	268960
N.Molhoiphai	170	98.11%	1179	0.0%	98.24%	268961
Gwaltabi Kuki	131	100.0%	899	0.0%	100.0%	268962
Mongneljang	368	98.34%	978	0.0%	99.73%	268963
Wunghol Tangkhul	0	NA	NA	NA	NA	268964
Saibol	119	64.55%	951	0.0%	100.0%	268965
P.Phaimol	184	49.69%	978	0.0%	99.46%	268966
Twichin	218	58.17%	896	0.0%	100.0%	268967
Laikot Kom	200	76.47%	923	0.0%	98.5%	268968
Laikot Phaijol	236	78.24%	1017	0.0%	95.76%	268969
S.Phailenkot	318	94.14%	1092	0.0%	100.0%	268970
Chingdai Khullen	222	92.31%	695	0.0%	99.55%	268971
Thingjang	171	76.51%	727	0.0%	99.42%	268972
Chingmang	273	86.15%	993	0.0%	100.0%	268973
Chingdai Khunou	147	55.22%	1130	0.0%	99.32%	268974
Tuinomjang	143	76.99%	882	0.0%	97.2%	268975
L.Chayang	286	69.71%	1014	0.0%	99.3%	268976
P.Geljang	155	90.97%	1183	0.0%	100.0%	268977
Purum Khullen	123	97.39%	952	0.0%	99.19%	268978
Happy Valley	116	86.92%	933	0.0%	99.14%	268979
Khamenlok	241	98.62%	975	0.0%	100.0%	268980
D.Leikot	215	93.64%	937	0.0%	97.21%	268981
H.Khopibung	208	71.17%	1167	0.96%	97.12%	268982
Thombol	107	88.76%	1610	0.0%	100.0%	268983
Aigejang	412	80.32%	890	0.0%	96.12%	268984
Jordanphai	169	89.93%	1036	0.0%	100.0%	268985
Govajang	160	86.92%	818	0.0%	100.0%	268986
Challouphai	120	62.37%	905	0.0%	95.0%	268987
Khongbal Tangkhul	415	89.47%	976	0.96%	92.77%	268988
Gangpiyang	486	95.05%	1104	0.0%	90.74%	268989
Purum Likli	226	84.62%	1260	0.44%	95.13%	268990
Wakan	204	58.43%	943	0.0%	100.0%	268991
Songphel	173	84.25%	901	0.0%	100.0%	268992
T.Wakanphai	205	58.24%	952	0.0%	100.0%	268993
Khokon	189	56.68%	969	0.0%	94.18%	268994
Maibung Likli	161	65.22%	1091	0.0%	98.76%	268995
Songjang	183	40.25%	1103	0.0%	99.45%	268996
H.Champhai	520	73.21%	926	0.0%	99.62%	268997
Ngakhapat	104	86.32%	1167	0.0%	95.19%	268998
P.Khonomphai	338	61.77%	1036	0.0%	100.0%	268999
Sinam Kom	264	88.76%	1000	0.0%	98.11%	269000
Maibung Kom	127	80.53%	954	0.0%	93.7%	269001
Ngarumphung	400	61.6%	914	0.0%	99.0%	269002
Sailent	363	72.42%	1006	0.0%	98.35%	269003
S.Loushing	134	89.26%	1094	0.0%	100.0%	269004
Maphou Tangkhul	0	NA	NA	NA	NA	269005
Happy Land	232	89.9%	886	0.0%	99.14%	269006
Tongkoi	190	93.17%	1111	0.0%	99.47%	269007
Moirangpan	316	87.9%	1039	0.0%	98.1%	269008
Laikoiching	659	79.44%	1015	0.0%	99.24%	269009
Siloijang	154	80.0%	1000	0.0%	100.0%	269010
Bethelphai	261	97.81%	1212	0.0%	99.23%	269011
Maphou Kuki	509	53.2%	1028	0.0%	98.43%	269012
Thangjingpokpi	546	62.61%	985	0.0%	97.25%	269013
Rishophung	354	74.05%	967	0.0%	99.72%	269014
Leishiphung	180	88.55%	1143	0.0%	100.0%	269015
Kamu Saichang	411	60.54%	986	0.0%	100.0%	269016
Saichang	173	50.89%	1012	0.0%	100.0%	269017
L.Songphel	164	93.28%	885	0.0%	100.0%	269018
Chaningpokpi	192	88.17%	1000	0.0%	100.0%	269019
Molkonbung	174	91.88%	1023	0.0%	100.0%	269020
L.Molnom	274	88.7%	1076	0.0%	95.62%	269021
S.Bungjang	154	80.0%	1000	0.0%	99.35%	269022
Kaihao Tangkhul	264	80.18%	1062	0.0%	98.86%	269023
Bongbal Khullen	304	88.14%	1082	0.0%	99.34%	269024
K.Hengjang	114	88.79%	781	0.0%	100.0%	269025
K.Nungmanbi	75	80.82%	1083	0.0%	98.67%	269026
Leingangpokpi	15	92.31%	875	0.0%	100.0%	269027
Kamuching	789	77.08%	1013	0.0%	99.87%	269028
C.Moljol	161	59.69%	963	0.62%	98.14%	269029
Gotangkot	192	35.76%	1000	0.0%	98.96%	269030
Pheitaiching	65	78.18%	1167	0.0%	100.0%	269031
Heirokland	208	93.72%	891	0.0%	99.52%	269032
Zerukanan	51	83.78%	759	0.0%	98.04%	269033
Kamu Tangnom	128	81.31%	1286	0.0%	91.41%	269034
Kamu Lairok	125	40.71%	1049	0.0%	98.4%	269035
Kamu Koireng	324	45.12%	976	0.0%	99.07%	269036
Heichanglok (K.Salemphai)	238	74.88%	1034	0.0%	99.58%	269037
Lairok Vaiphei	116	72.55%	1367	5.17%	94.83%	269038
Kamu Tampak	159	59.09%	1446	0.0%	100.0%	269039
New Salem	191	42.6%	910	0.0%	97.38%	269040
Thayong	680	58.83%	1006	0.0%	99.26%	269041
Nungkot Kom	158	63.83%	1194	0.0%	100.0%	269042
Nungkot Khuman	136	58.27%	1030	0.0%	100.0%	269043
Tombi Hangbu	127	49.55%	984	0.0%	100.0%	269044
N.Terakhong	193	86.71%	771	0.0%	99.48%	269045
N.Heikon	194	54.86%	813	0.0%	95.36%	269046
Songpehjang	62	77.08%	1000	0.0%	100.0%	269047
Nongmaiban	94	81.58%	1000	0.0%	100.0%	269048
Teraphai	27	60.0%	1077	0.0%	100.0%	269049
Tuisenphai	162	77.44%	884	0.0%	97.53%	269050
Ayokpa Kabui	0	NA	NA	NA	NA	269051
Keirao Chingdong	81	85.48%	841	0.0%	100.0%	269052
Uran Chiru	268	75.76%	956	0.0%	95.9%	269053
Laiphrok Maring	452	69.72%	1045	0.0%	98.45%	269054
Sandangsemba Maring	665	59.57%	944	0.0%	95.49%	269055
Karpur Sungba	145	77.17%	933	0.0%	100.0%	269056
Lemba Khul	205	80.63%	990	0.0%	99.51%	269057
Waithou Chiru	671	62.75%	1222	0.0%	95.68%	269058
Saman Tangkhul	100	83.67%	1326	0.0%	100.0%	269059
Phunal Maring	1212	63.91%	1065	0.0%	97.44%	269060
Poirou Tangkhul	289	87.27%	993	0.0%	97.58%	269061
Leisem Lok	203	84.85%	1071	0.0%	94.58%	269062
Kaprang	156	83.89%	1108	0.0%	98.08%	269063
Salam Patong	957	70.13%	1032	0.0%	99.27%	269064
Somrei	0	NA	NA	NA	NA	269065
Komla Ching	104	71.08%	1122	0.0%	98.08%	269066
Soraland	173	92.86%	966	0.0%	98.27%	269067
Tangkhul Khullen	255	66.96%	917	0.0%	95.29%	269068
Phungton	0	NA	NA	NA	NA	269069
Irong Tangkhul	284	69.78%	1470	0.0%	99.3%	269070
Ngoupikhong Vaiphei	285	54.12%	1192	0.0%	96.14%	269071
Phowoibi	230	32.98%	966	0.0%	100.0%	269072
Phainom	225	55.98%	1045	0.0%	98.67%	269073
Nongmaiching Tampak	359	73.23%	1075	0.0%	99.16%	269074
Th.Salemphai	164	86.25%	822	0.0%	99.39%	269075
Haokhongching	252	90.62%	1211	0.0%	96.43%	269076
S.Kanan	159	68.09%	916	0.0%	97.48%	269077
Phailenjang	135	94.64%	776	0.0%	100.0%	269078
Vaiphei Pakai	122	93.58%	1140	0.0%	98.36%	269079
Horton	0	NA	NA	NA	NA	269080
Lungther	431	96.24%	995	0.0%	98.38%	269081
Heinganglok	242	93.81%	1017	0.0%	97.93%	269082
Selhao Vaiphei	173	83.45%	1035	0.0%	99.42%	269083
Sada Tangkhul	60	100.0%	935	0.0%	98.33%	269084
Kharam Tangkhul	234	60.56%	950	0.0%	98.72%	269085
Leihaopokpi	0	NA	NA	NA	NA	269086
Kwarok Maring	277	44.53%	1007	0.0%	96.75%	269087
Elimphai	0	NA	NA	NA	NA	269088
