= Makui =

Village in Manipur, India

- Interactive map of Makui
- Location in Manipur, India Makui (India)
- Coordinates: 25°07′36″N 93°47′16″E
- Country: India
- State: Manipur
- District: Kangpokpi

Population (2011)
  - Total: 1,616

Language(s)
  - Official: Meitei (Manipuri)
  - Spoken: Liangmai, Thadou
- Time zone: UTC+5:30 (IST)

Makui is a cluster of villages in the Tujang Waichong Subdivision of Kangpokpi district in Manipur, India. It lies along a tributary called Langka river of Irang River to the west of Mount Koubru. The main village is called Makui Naga, a Liangmai village, and next to it is Makui Chaljang, a Kuki village. Upstream along the tributaries of Langka river and up on the hills are further Liangmai villages: Makui Khuman (or Thebram), Makui Thanamba (or Chamriupiu) and Makui Asang. Upstream along the Irang River is a Kuki village called Makui Mayangkhang (now called Wakotphai). Many of these villages were affected in the 2026 Kuki–Naga clashes.

== Geography and history ==
Mount Koubru region (SoI data, 1922–1939)

Several streams rising below the western side of Mount Koubru join together in the Langka river (marked as "Asikade Nadi" in the old survey map), a tributary of the Irang River. On its right bank, multiple villages named "Makui" arose in historical times and more continue to crop up to the present day. The majority of them are populated by Liangmai Nagas, but at least one belongs to the Kuki people. The name "Makui" is said to form a tradition of the Liangmai people.

Old survey data from 1922–1939 shows two villages called Makui Khulen and Makui Khunou at the head of a stream called Awaghui Ki, which debauches into the Langka river. The villages were listed in the 1947 Hill Peoples' Regulation as Naga villages with 12 and 26 households respectively. Their respective populations in 1961 were 43 and 194. Both the villages moved down to the foothills in later times and combined to form the "Makui Naga" village.

Very near to those villages on the same ridge was a Kuki village called "Makui Khongjai". It was at the head of a stream called Vago Dung, which flows west into the Irang River. That village also moved down to the foothills (in the Irang river valley) and changed its name to Makui Mayangkhang. It was listed as a hill village in the Manipur Gazette in 1956 though it was missed in the 1947 regulation. Its 1961 population was 299. Its current name is "Wakotphai".

Makui Chaljang (Note: It is often listed as "M. Chaljang" or just "Chaljang". Alternative spelling "Cheljang" is also found. In the map, it was misspelt as "Chaijang".) was already in the foothills in the old survey map, along a stream called Reighiu Ki, which also debouches into the Langka river. The village was listed in the 1947 Hill People's Regulation as "Chaljang" with 35 households. Its 1961 population was 106.

Thanamba (Note: Alternative spellings: "Thonamba", "Tonamba", "Thunamba".) is shown in the old survey map on the eastern slopes of the Koubru range, facing Kangpokpi. But it was not listed in either 1947 or 1956, but in the 1961 census, it was shown with a population of 31 people. Even though the Survey of India map continues to place it in the Kangpokpi valley, to the west of Keithelmanbi, it does not appear to be there any more. News reports in 2026 place "Thanamba Naga" in the Makui region. Other news reports call it "Makui Thanamba" and say that it is also called "Makui Chamriupiu". (Note: It is possible that there is a Thanamba village in the Kangpokpi valley and a separate Makui-Thanamba in the Makui area. But there is only village listed in the census. Also, the MARSAC map and Survey of India give inconsistent locations for the original Thanamba village.)

To the south of Makui Thanamba, a stream by name Adai Ki flows down from the Koubru peak, joining the Langka river downstream. On its banks are two further Makui villages: Makui Thebram (also called Makui Khuman) on the right bank (north bank) and Makui Saramjou on the left bank (south bank). Makui Saramjou and Thebram have also been called "Makui, Part 2" and "Makui, Part 3" respectively, suggesting that they grew out of the Makui Naga village. Both the villages are reported to have been affected in the Kuki-Naga clashes of the 1990s.

To the north of Makui Thanamba, another village called "Makui Asang" was formed on the hill slopes of the Naibet river basin. It was listed for the first time in the 2001 census with 52 households. It does not have any Scheduled Tribe population.

Two other villages called "Makui Pipuram" and "Makui Khunjao" are mentioned in news reports.> They are not marked on maps. Makui Khunjao is 12 km away from the other Makui villages.

=== Other villages ===
The upper course of the Langka river (marked as "Jolango Nadi" in the old survey map) flows north in a valley of its own and bends northwest into the channel of Adai Ki, where the two rivers join. The district boundary in this area lies along the river, with the eastern bank lying in the Kangpokpi district and the western bank in the Tamenglong district. The Langka village on the right bank, populated by Liangmai people, stays in the Kangpokpi district, while two Kuki villages on its left bank, called Lasan and S. Songjang, fall under Tamenglong district.

== Demographics ==
As per the 2011 census, Makui Naga has a population of 1616 people living in 304 households, of which 819 are males and 797 are females. The sex ratio of Makui Naga is 974, which is lower than the state average of 985. The literacy rate is 73% compared to state average of 77%. Almost the entire population is made up of Scheduled Tribes (mostly Liangmai people).

Makui Asang has a population of 503 people in the 2011 census.

== Recent developments ==
In May 2023, an ethnic conflict erupted in Manipur mainly between the Meitei and Kuki people. This did not directly affect the villages on the Imphal–Tamenglong Road. However, in 2026, the conflict turned into one between Kuki and Naga tribals. A key development was the killing of three Kuki-Zo pastors between Churachandpur to Kangpokpi in the mountain heights above the Ireng Naga village, and the subsequent hostage crisis, in which six Naga civilians from Konsa Khul were found killed. Soon afterwards, the Naga community led by the United Naga Council imposed an economic blockade on the Kangpokpi district.

== See also ==
- List of populated places in Kangpokpi district

== Bibliography ==
- R. K. Birendra Singh (1961), District Census Handbook – Manipur, Census of India 1961 (PDF), Government of Manipur
- Senapati District Census Handbook (PDF), Directorate of Census Operations, Manipur, 2001
- Naorem Sanajaoba, ed. (1988), Manipur: Treaties and Documents, Volume 4, Mittal Publications, ISBN 9788170998532
- Kuthar, Greeshma (1 September 2026). "Dying on These Hills: The senseless cycle of Naga–Kuki violence in Manipur". The Caravan.
