= Tujang Waichong =

Village in Manipur, India

Tujang Waichong T. Waichong
- Interactive map of Tujang Waichong
- Location in Manipur, India Tujang Waichong (India)
- Coordinates: 25°14′01″N 93°50′48″E
- Country: India
- State: Manipur
- District: Kangpokpi
- Elevation: 900 m (3,000 ft)

Population (2011)
  - Total: 1,003

Language(s)
  - Official: Meitei (Manipuri)
  - Spoken: Thadou
- Time zone: UTC+5:30 (IST)

Tujang Waichong (Note: Also spelt as Tujangwaichong, Tuyang Waichong and Tuijang Waichong.) or T. Waichong is a Kuki village in the Kangpokpi district of Manipur, India, and the headquarters of the Tujang Waichong Subdivision. It is on the bank of the Irang River, along the Imphal–Tamenglong Road. It is a historic village for the Kuki community of Manipur, and became a subdivision headquarters in 2018.

== Geography ==
Tujang Waichong shown to the west of Koubru range (SoI, 1922–1939)

The Tujang Waichong village is at the foothills of a hill range called Sintong Bung, on the right bank of the Irang River. On the opposite bank lies the Koubru hill with a long sloping western face, which houses numerous streams and dozens of hill villages.

The Irang river originates to the northeast of Tujang Waichong in the saddle points mediating between the Sintong Bung range and the Koubru range. It flows due southwest till the Makui cluster of villages, where it is met by the Langka River and turns northwest into the Tamenglong district.

== History ==
The 1947 Hill People's Regulation listed Tujang Waichong as "Kuki village" with 42 households. It was then put in Tamenglong Circle No. 2. By 1956, it was moved to the Sadar Hills Subdivision (present-day Kangpokpi district), along with other villages on the right bank of Irang River. For decades, survey maps showed the border between Tamenglong district and Sadar Hills along the Irang River, but the villages on the right bank of the river were still shown as being part of Sadar Hills. However, recent maps prepared by the Manipur Remote Sensing Applications Centre (MARSAC) show the district border to the west of the river, including all the right bank villages.

In 1949, the Kuki church leaders of the "north-western" region of Manipur broke with the Naga churches due to differences, and met at the Tujangwaichong Baptist Church to form their own association. This eventually culminated in the formation of the Kuki Baptist Association (KBA). In 1958, the Kuki Baptist Associations of the northwestern and northeastern Manipur met at the same church to form the Kuki Baptist Convention.

In the 1961 census, Tujang Waichong had a population of 424 people living in 68 households. By this time, Sadar Hills had been combined with the Mao region to form a "Mao and Sadar Hills" subdivision, which later became the Senapati district.

In 2016, after decades of agitation, Sadar Hills was separated out from the Senapati district and made into Kangpokpi district. Subsequently, the district was divided into nine subdivisions, with Tujang Waichong Subdivision being one of them. The subdivision essentially includes the basin of the Irang River with the village of Khommunom at the northern end and the Langka villages at the southern end.

== Demographics ==
As per the 2011 census, T. Waichong has a population of 1003 people living in 195 households, of which 508 are males and 495 are females. The sex ratio of T. Waichong 974, which is lower than the state average of 985. The literacy rate is 95% compared to state average of 77%.

67 percent of the population of T. Waichong is made up of Scheduled Tribes (mostly Kuki people). The remainder are expected to be settlers from other parts of India, mainly Nepali people.

== Recent developments ==
In May 2023, an ethnic conflict erupted in Manipur mainly between the Meitei and Kuki people. This did not directly affect the villages on the Imphal–Tamenglong Road. However, in 2026, the conflict turned into one between Kuki and Naga tribals. A key development was the killing of three Kuki-Zo pastors between Churachandpur to Kangpokpi in the mountain heights above the Ireng Naga village, and the subsequent hostage crisis, in which six Naga civilians from Konsa Khul were found killed. Soon afterwards, the Naga community led by the United Naga Council imposed an economic blockade on the Kangpokpi district.

== See also ==
- List of populated places in Kangpokpi district

== Bibliography ==
- Senapati District Census Handbook (PDF), Directorate of Census Operations, Manipur, 2001
- Kuthar, Greeshma (1 September 2026). "Dying on These Hills: The senseless cycle of Naga–Kuki violence in Manipur". The Caravan.
