= Kuki Christian Church =

- Classification: Christianity, Protestant
- Orientation: Trinity, New Testament Christianity
- Moderator: Administrative Secretary T. Lunkim
- Associations: World Council of Churches, World Alliance of Reformed Churches, Council for World Mission, Christian Conference of Asia, Communion of Churches in India, National Council of Churches in India
- Region: Manipur, Nagaland, Tripura, Assam
- Founder: T. Lunkim
- Origin: 1959; 67 years ago Molnom, Kangpokpi district, Manipur
- Congregations: 400+
- Members: 200,000 members
- Ministers: 200+ Upas
- Missionaries: 61
- Hospitals: 1
- Primary schools: 12
- Secondary schools: 2
- Tertiary institutions: 2 Seminaries

The Kuki Christian Church (KCC) is a Church association serving the Kuki people in Northeast India. It is part of the National Council of Churches in India (NCCI). Through the NCCI, the KCC is part of the World Council of Churches (WCC).

== History ==
The Kuki Christian Church (KCC) was formed in May 1959 at Molnom in Sadar Hills, Manipur under the name "Kuki National Christian Council". It had its roots in the earlier Kuki Baptist Convention formed in 1958 at Tujang Waichong.

During the British colonial times, there were three Baptist associations in Manipur, one in Sadar Hills, one in the North-East (Ukhrul) and one in the North-West (Tamenglong). In 1947, problems erupted between Kukis and Nagas in the North-Western Baptist Association, which could not be resolved by the Standard Committee of the Associations. In 1950, Kukis formed a separate association named Kuki Christian Association, later renamed Kuki Baptist Association (1955).

Another Kuki Baptist Association also came into being in the North-East in 1955. The two associations came together at Tujai Waichong on 16 March 1958, the joint organisation being named the Kuki Baptist Convention (KBC). It had its headquarters at Motbung and a Bible School at Phaicham Centre. It was led by Thadou-Kuki people but open to other Kuki people as well. Its first executive secretary was Tongkhojang Lunkim (T. Lunkim). According to scholar Thongkholal Haokip, it was a linguistic Convention, and was concerned with the fragmentation of Kuki churches. In 1959, a federated organisation called Kuki National Christian Council was formed, later changed to "Kuki Christian Council", and T. Lunkim was elected as its president.

When the issue of translation of Bible into the native language came up, disputes arose regarding the name of the language. T. Lunkim preferred to call it the "Kuki language", whereas the members of the Thadou clan and its subclans insisted on calling it the "Thadou language". The dispute led to a split in the organisation, leading to the formation of a Thadou Baptist Association (TBA) in 1967. Yet another Chongthu Baptist Association came into being in 1971. Other Kuki tribes also formed their own associations bearing their tribe names.

The final name "Kuki Christian Church" was adopted in 1977 at Nomjang in North Cachar Hills. The transformation of "Council" to "Church" was seen by some as having been detrimental to church unification attempts. Others view the Kuki Baptist Convention as having split into TBA and KCC, its two largest offshoots.

== Administration ==
Kuki Christian Church is governed by the Assembly of the Synods. Each synod has an executive secretary, and an annual conference takes place where moderators and leaders of the assembly are chosen by representatives of the synods. The head of the congregation is T. Lunkim.

The synods and their headquarters are:

- Kuki Christian Church, Nagaland Synod, Mission Compound, Molvom
- Kuki Christian Church, Tripura Synod, Damcherra, North Tripura
- Kuki Christian Church, Assam Synod, Songpijang, NC Hills
- Kuki Christian Church, Manipur Synod, Dewlahlane, Imphal

=== Institutions ===
In addition to evangelism and other church activities, the KCC gives equal importance to human-resource development with Christian values. The congregation has established Trulock Theological Seminary, Imphal, Manipur Synod. The seminary offers B.Th. BD and M.Div degrees.

== See also ==
- Kuki people
- Kukish languages
- Kuki Baptist Convention
