= Leilon Vaiphei =

Village in Manipur, India

- Interactive map of Leilon Vaiphei
- Location in Manipur, India Leilon Vaiphei (India)
- Coordinates: 24°55′38″N 93°49′09″E
- Country: India
- State: Manipur
- District: Kangpokpi

Population (2011)
  - Total: 967

Language(s)
  - Official: Meitei (Manipuri)
  - Spoken: Vaiphei
- Time zone: UTC+5:30 (IST)

Leilon Vaiphei (Note: "Leilon" is sometimes misspelled as "Leiton" in official documents, and older spelling "Waiphei" is also used. The Survey of India map spelt the name as "Lilanwaiphai".) is a tribal village in the Kangpokpi district of Manipur, India, on the eastern slopes of the Koubru hills range. It lies to the southwest of Leimakhong at an elevation of 1100 m. The village is populated by Vaiphei people, a tribe of Kuki-Zo people.

The village faced persistent land disputes with the neighbouring Konsakhul village, and ended up with a major hostage crisis during the 2023–2026 Manipur conflict.

== Geography ==
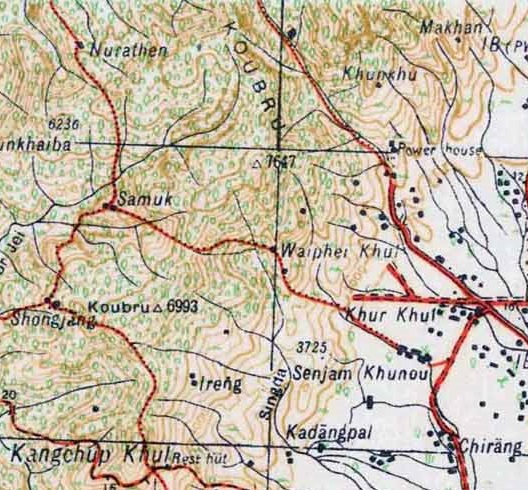
1944 Survey of India map of the region; shows peak 7647 and streams Leimakhong, Tagiu (unlabelled) and Singda

From the peak 7647 in Koubru hills range, two streams flow down: the Singda stream (Vabom Luipi) on the west and Tagiu stream (Tuipet gom) in the east. The Leilon Vaiphei village is on the eastern bank of the Tagiu stream at an elevation of 1,100 metres (3,600 ft). Leilon Khunou, a smaller village that is said to be an offshoot of Leilon Vaiphei, is to the east of it. In recent years, another offshoot village called Leilon Munlui has been formed on the western bank of the Tagiu stream. All these villages are populated by Vaiphei people, a tribe of Kuki-Zo people.

On the bank of the Singda stream, about 1.5 km to the west of Leilon Vaiphei is a Liangmai Naga village called Konsakhul. There have been persistent disputes in recent decades between Konsakhul and Leilon Vaiphei regarding historical land ownership.

A number of villages at the foothills of peak 7247 bear the prefix "Leilon" (often abbreviated to "L."). These include L. Tangnuam (also known as Haraothel), L. Phaijang, L. Munlai and L. Saronphai. The first of these, L. Tangnuam, is said to have been formed in 1966 (obtaining official recognition in 1972), with Leilon Vaiphei and Konsakhul as its parent villages.

The foothills of the Koubru range in this region are interrupted by a small subsidiary range called the Koutruk hill range. The Tagiu stream flows around the Koutruk hill, with the L. Tangnuam (Haraothel) formed on its right bank, at the foot of Koutruk hill.

Konsakhul was originally on a route between Samuk on the western side of the Koubru range and Senjam Khunou in Imphal Valley. After the growth of the Leimakhong town, an alternative road has been laid from Konsakhul to Leimakhong, which passes through the Leilon Vaiphei village. Called the "Konsakhul Road", it is now the main transportation link to Konsakhul. There have been occasions where Leilon Vaiphei villagers intercepted travellers along the road, leading to crises.

== History ==
The 1944 survey map shows a village called "Waiphei Khul" on the bank of the Singda stream. This is presumably a precursor to the present-day Leilon Vaiphei village. A few metres below Waiphei Khul is an unlabelled village which is likely Konsakhul. The present-day residents of Konsakhul display a 1920 lease agreement between a chief of Konsakhul named Phengamang and a certain Shonglal Khaute, who was seeking to establish "a hamlet of Vaiphei within the traditional boundary of Konsakhul". The lease was to last 100 years. This agreement could have referred to the Waiphei Khul marked on the 1944 map. At present, there is no village at that location (24.9241°N 93.8030°E).

The 1947 Hill People's Regulation listed a village called "Leilon Waiphei" as a "Kuki village" with 62 households. Next to it was another village called "Leilon Waiphei Khunow" (now Leilon Khunou), which was also a "Kuki village" with 17 houses. Also listed along with them was "Konsa Kacha Naga" (Konsakhul) with 16 houses, "Kacha Naga" being a former cover term for Zeme and Liangmai people.

In the 1961 census, Leilon Vaiphei was noted to have a population of 388 people and Leilon Khunou a population of 115. Konsakhul was considerably smaller with a population of 73 people. During the Kuki–Naga clashes of the 1990s, many Naga villages were displaced from the present-day Kangpokpi district (and Kuki villages displaced from Tamenglong and Ukhrul districts). Konsakhul does not appear to have been affected by these trends. In fact, its population doubled from 112 to 210 during the period 1901–2001, indicating that Liangmai Nagas felt safe in the neighbourhood and possibly attracted other Liangmais to settle here.

Despite the amicable relations between the two villages, there has been an unresolved land dispute between them. The Konsakhul village cites the 1920 lease agreement, per which Leilon Vaiphei was supposed to have paid an annual tax in terms of paddy produce. The Leilon Vaiphei denies these claims saying that it was already in existence in 1917–1918 with 37 tax-paying households. It challenged Konsakhul village to submit the alleged 1920 agreement for forensic examination.

=== National Sports University dispute ===
The lands of L. Tangnuam (Haraothel), reportedly formed in 1966 as an offshoot of Leilon Vaiphei, came for contestation when, in 2015, a National Sports University was proposed for construction in its vicinity. The Kuki Students Organisation of Sadar Hills (Note: Sadar Hills was then a subdivision of the Senapati district. In 2017, it became a separate Kangpokpi district.) first raised an alarm based on the maps published in newspapers. It transpired that L. Tangnuam laid claim to 137.62 acres (55.69 ha) out of 325.60 acres (131.77 ha) allocated to the University. On 17 August 2017, Konsakhul and Leilon Vaiphei issued a joint statement claiming to be the parent villages of L. Tangnuam, and demanding that their approval must be sought for the construction. By 2020, a Konsakhul Area Joint Action Committee was formed to contest the land acquisition, and Konsakhul became the lead disputant. It was in this context that Konsakhul's claim of having leased out its land to the Kukis in the past first appeared in the press.

== Demographics ==
As per the 2011 census, Leilon Vaiphei has a population of 694 people living in 123 households. Leilon Khunou has a population of 273 people living in 52 households.

The foothills villages that include L. Phoikot, L. Phaijang, L. Chamchai and Haraothel (L. Tangnuam) have a combined population of 1263 people.

== Recent developments ==
=== 2023 clash ===
In March 2023, two villagers of Konsakhul passing through Leilon Vaiphei enroute to their village were detained by the latter. Police from Leimakhong police station quickly came and had them released, but their vehicles, including a JCB excavator, were allegedly destroyed. The Leilon Vaiphei chief later issued a statement saying that the Leilon Area Siel Society (LASS), in which both the communities were members, had summoned one of the detained individuals in the past for destroying fences and illegally shooting mithuns. But the man failed to appear. Hence the villagers used the opportunity to detain him for questioning.

The matters did not rest there. The following day, there was a clash between the two villages and some 28 people were injured. Afterwards, there were verbal exchanges between the two villages. Konsakhul village authority repeated its claims that Leilon Vaiphei was sitting on land that was leased from Konsakhul. Leilon Vaiphei denied the claim and challenged Konsakhul to submit the alleged lease agreement for forensic examination. During the to-and-fro exchanges, the village authority also claimed that "21 [Kuki-Zo] villages" had sprung up within its boundary, and suggested that they were made up of "illegal immigrants" brought from Burma. In response, the 21 villages demanded an apology and threatened to blockade all roads leading to Konsakhul.

=== 2025 flare-ups ===
In January 2025, in the midst of the Manipur conflict, the Konsakhul village alleged that a Liangmai Naga woman at the K. Lungwiram (Konsakhul Lungwiram) village near Leimakhong was obstructed by a group of Kuki-Zo men from levelling of her land, and even that they had "assaulted" her. Holding Leilon Vaiphei responsible, Konsakhul declared its villagers had violated the trust of Liangmai Nagas as "tenants", and gave an "eviction notice". The chief of Leilon Vaiphei denied the allegations as baseless, but a Liangmai women's organisation blockaded the Sak-Puiluang Road, a vital lifeline for the Kuki-Zo people as part of the hill road connecting Churachandpur and Kangpokpi. Amid rising tensions, the district administration imposed a curfew on Konsakhul and Leilon Vaiphei villages. The blockade appears to have been lifted after a few days.

This was followed by exchanges of claims and counter-claims in newspaper columns by Liangmai and Kuki-Zo commentators. The organisation called "Young Kuki" questioned the authenticity of the claimed 1920 lease agreement by pointing out that it was anachronistically written with a ballpoint pen, which did not even exist in the year in question.

Another dispute arose in April 2025 when Konsakhul villagers engaged in development work on land called "Gulpi Tuitin" near the L. Phaijang and L. Tangnuam (Haraothel) villages. Konsakhul apparently disregarded standing orders from district authorities to maintain the status quo. This resulted in their villagers attacking Konsakhul, during which the latter's village chief was seriously injured. Various Naga organisations rallied behind Konsakhul and condemned the assault.

=== 2026 hostage crisis ===
Tensions between the Kuki and Naga communities heated up in February 2026 soon after a new elected government was sworn in under the leadership of Yumnam Khemchand Singh. Persistent clashes began in the Litan area of Ukhrul district, resulting in the deaths of at least four individuals and a mutual blockade of supplies to Kuki and Naga villages.

On 13 May, a convoy of vehicles carrying Kuki-Zo pastors and church leaders along the Churachandpur–Kangpokpi hill road, was ambushed by armed militants suspected to belong to Naga and Meitei insurgent groups. Three pastors were killed on the spot, including a respected church leader Vumthang Sitlhou, who was even engaged in peace-talks between the warring communities. Within hours, a party of Konsakhul villagers travelling through Leilon Vaiphei was intercepted and taken hostage. Men were separated from women and taken away, while the females were detained in the village. It was declared as a retaliation for the killing of the pastors. Soon, there was retaliatory hostage-taking by the Naga communities in the village of Ireng Naga and the town of Senapati.

On 15 May, 14 hostages from each side (mostly women) were released, leaving 6 Naga men and 14 Kuki men unaccounted for. While the Kuki hostages were under the control of United Naga Council, the whereabouts of the Naga hostages remained unknown. After protracted negotiations, all the Kuki hostages were released on 9 June, but the next day, the Naga hostages were found to have been killed and their mutilated bodies were found by security forces. The Naga groups blamed Kuki National Front - President faction for the killing of hostages and imposed a months-long blockade on Kuki-Zo villages.

== Bibliography ==
- Senapati District Census Handbook (PDF), Directorate of Census Operations, Manipur, 2001
- Kuthar, Greeshma (1 September 2026). "Dying on These Hills: The senseless cycle of Naga–Kuki violence in Manipur". The Caravan.
