= List of districts of Manipur =

Manipur, a state in India, has sixteen administrative districts.

== Administration ==
A district of an Indian state is an administrative geographical unit, headed by a district magistrate or a deputy commissioner, an officer belonging to the Indian Administrative Service. The district magistrate or the deputy commissioner is assisted by a number of officials belonging to different wings of the administrative services of the state.

A superintendent of Police, an officer belonging to Indian Police Service is entrusted with the responsibility of maintaining law and order and related issues.

On 9 December 2016, the government created 7 new districts, bringing the total number of districts to 16.

== Districts ==
District map of Manipur

Manipur is divided into 16 districts

Sl No	Code	District	Headquarters	Population (2011)	Area (km²)	Website	Map
1	BPR	Bishnupur	Bishnupur	237,399	496	https://bishnupur.nic.in/	
2	CDL	Chandel	Chandel	85,072	2,100	https://chandel.nic.in/	
3	CCP	Churachandpur	Churachandpur	274,143	4,750	https://churachandpur.nic.in/	
4	IE	Imphal East	Porompat	412,275	497	https://imphaleast.nic.in/	
5	IW	Imphal West	Lamphelpat	517,992	519	https://imphalwest.nic.in/	
6	JBM	Jiribam	Jiribam	43,838	232	https://jiribam.nic.in/	
7	KAK	Kakching	Kakching	135,481	192	https://kakching.nic.in/	
8	KJ	Kamjong	Kamjong	45,616	2,000	https://kamjong.nic.in/	
9	KPI	Kangpokpi	Kanggui	193,744	1,698	https://kangpokpi.nic.in/	
10	NL	Noney	Noney	50,881	1,604.04	https://noney.nic.in/	
11	PZ	Pherzawl	Pherzawl	40,390	2,285	https://pherzawl.nic.in/	
12	SE	Senapati	Tahamzam	479,148	3,271	https://senapati.nic.in/	
13	TML	Tamenglong	Tamenglong	156,784	4,395	https://tamenglong.nic.in/	
14	TNL	Tengnoupal	Tengnoupal	59,110	1,142	https://tengnoupal.nic.in/	
15	TBL	Thoubal	Thoubal	286,687	324	https://thoubal.nic.in/	
16	UKR	Ukhrul	Ukhrul	138,382	2,206	https://ukhrul.nic.in/	

== Languages ==
District	Indigenous names of districts	Languages (major)	Languages (minor)
Bishnupur		Meitei	Kom*, Kabui
Thoubal	Thoubal	Meitei	Aimol, Anal*, Maring
Imphal East	Imphal East	Meitei, Kabui	Tangkhul*, Thadou*, Mao*, Hmar*, Paite*, Gangte*, Vaiphei
Imphal West	Imphal West	Meitei, Kabui	Tangkhul*, Thadou*, Mao*, Hmar*, Paite*, Gangte*, Vaiphei
Senapati	Tahamzam	Mao*, Poula*	Maram, Thangal, Liangmai, Maram, Rongmai, Inpui, Tangkhul*
Ukhrul	Ukhrul	Tangkhul*	Thadou*
Chandel	Chandel	Thadou*, Anal*, Lamkang	Maring, Moyon, Monsang, Chothe, Gangte, Tarao, Vaiphei
Churachandpur	Lamka	Paite*, Thadou*, Hmar, Vaiphei*, Zou, Gangte	Kom*, Aimol, Chiru, Meitei, Simte
Tamenglong	Inriangluang	Rongmei, Liangmei, Zemei, Inpui	Thadou*, Chiru, Hmar*
Jiribam	Jiribam	Meitei, Bengali, Hmar*	Rongmei, Thadou*, Paite, Gangte, Vaiphei
Kangpokpi (Sadar Hills)	Kanggui	Thadou*, Nepali	Kom*, Liangmai, Thangal, Rongmei, Aimol, Tangkhul*, Koireng, Kharam, Vaiphei, Gangte, Hmar*
Kakching	Kakching	Meitei, Loi*	_
Tengnoupal	Tengnoupal	Maring, Thadou*, Gangte	Aimol*, Zou
Kamjong	Kamjong	Tangkhul	Thadou*
Noney	Longmai	Rongmei, Inpui	Gangte, Vaiphei
Pherzawl	Pherzawl	Hmar*, Thadou	Simte, Paite*, Bengali, Vaiphei, Gangte

- has many different dialects

== Subdivisions ==
Districts	Subdivisions
Bishnupur	Nambol, Moirang, Bishnupur
Thoubal	Thoubal, Lilong
Imphal East	Porompat, Keirao Bitra, Sawombung
Imphal West	Lamshang, Patsoi, Lamphelpat, Wangoi
Senapati	Tadubi, Paomata, Purul, Willong, Chilivai Phaibung, Songsong, Lairouching
Ukhrul	Ukhrul, Lungchong Maiphai, Chingai, Jessami
Chandel	Chandel, Chakpikarong, Khengjoy
Churachandpur	churchandpur, Tuiboung, Sangaikot, Mualnuam, Singngat, Henglep, Suangdoh, Kangvai, Samulamlan, Saikot
Tamenglong	Tamenglong, Tamei, Tousem
Jiribam	Jiribam, Borobekra
Kangpokpi (Sadar Hills)	Kangpokpi, Champhai, Saitu Gamphazol, Kangchup Geljang, Tuijang Waichong, Saikul, Lhungtin Island, Bungte Chiru
Kakching	Kakching, Waikhong
Tengnoupal	Machi, Moreh, Tengnoupal
Kamjong	Kamjong, Kasom Khullen, Sahamphung, Phungyar
Noney	Nungba, Khoupum, Longmai, Haochong
Pherzawl	Pherzawl, Parbung Tipaimukh, Vangai Range, Thanlon

== Demands for administrative reorganization ==
In August 2024, Chief Minister N. Biren Singh announced a statewide district boundary reorganization survey aimed at reorganizing district borders based on administrative convenience. However, any formal notifications or boundary changes are pending the completion of the 2027 census of India, which has frozen existing administrative boundaries until 31 March 2027.

== See also ==
- Administrative divisions of India
- Proposed states and union territories of India
