= Sadar Hills Autonomous District Council =

Type
- Type: Autonomous District Council

History
- Founded: 1971

Leadership
- Chief Executive Member: James Doujapao Haokip
- Seats: 24 Councillors

Elections
- Voting system: plurality voting

Meeting place
- Kangpokpi

Sadar Hills Autonomous District Council (SHADC) Is an autonomous district council in the state of Manipur India. It covers Saikul Subdivision, Saitu subdivision and Sadar Hills West Subdivision in Kangpokpi District of Manipur. It is one of the six autonomous district councils in Manipur state, and one of twenty five autonomous regions of India.
