= Khamenlok clash =

2023 clash in the Khamenlok area of Manipur

- Part of 2023–2025 Manipur violence
- Date: 12–14 June 2023
- Location: Khamenlok valley, Kangpokpi district, Manipur, India; 24°58′15″N 94°04′19″E

Parties
Meitei mobs: Arambai Tenggol; United National Liberation Front	Kuki villagers: Village defence volunteers

Number
3,000	Unknown

Casualties and losses
Official: 9 killed, 19 injured Unofficial: 200–300 killed, 400 injured	Unofficial: 1 killed, 3 injured

Casualties
- Arrested: None
- Damage: Several Kuki villages burned
- Location of the Aigejang village in the Khamenlok valley, branching off from the Iril River valley to the west

The Khamenlok clash occurred during 12–14 June 2023, in the course of 2023–2025 Manipur violence between the Meitei and Kuki people, in the Khamenlok river valley, a branch valley of the Iril River valley, in the Saikul subdivision of Kangpokpi district. An estimated mob of 3,000 Meitei assailants, some with sophisticated weapons, launched an attack on the Kuki villages in the Khamenlok valley, over a period of three days, burning houses and rampaging the area. While the Kuki villagers escaped to the hills on arrival of the assailants, security forces were blocked from reaching the area by women activist groups. Finally, on the night of 13–14 June, while the assailants were celebrating in a church building, the Kuki villagers descended from the hills and carried out a killing of the Meitei mobs that attacked them. The official death count was nine people, but unofficial estimates were in excess of 200 people. Even with the official figures, it was described by a newspaper as the "highest toll in a single incident" during the Manipur conflict. (Note: Hindustan Times described it as the "largest single-day toll", which is not really accurate. The largest single-day tolls were at the beginning of the conflict: 19 dead on 3 May, 35 on 4 May and 12 on 5 May. These figures remained unknown the mainstream media.)

== Background ==
=== Manipur violence ===
The 2023–2025 Manipur violence broke out on 3 May 2023, soon after a protest rally held by the tribal communities of Manipur. Starting out as clashes between the Meitei and Kuki (tribal) communities of Manipur at the border between Churachandpur and Bishnupur districts, the ethnic violence soon spun out of control engulfing the whole state. All the Meiteis living in the hill districts dominated by Kukis fled their homes and the Kukis living in the Imphal Valley did likewise, causing widespread displacement of over 60,000 people lasting a whole year while the violence continued unabated. The Meitei community has developed organised militias such as Arambai Tenggol and Meitei Leepun, which looted state police armouries to gain advanced weaponry, and used it to wage war against the tribal districts inhabited by Kukis.The Kukis, who possess licensed guns due to their hunting occupation, attempted to organise "village defence volunteers", while the security forces created "buffer zones" to keep the two sides apart. Both the sides possessed insurgent groups, whose role in the violence remained unclear.

=== Khamenlok valley ===
The Kangpokpi District, (Note: Kangpokpi district was previously the Sadar Hills subdivision of the Senapati district.) which surrounds the northern Imphal Valley on three sides, is mainly inhabited by Kukis. The jurisdiction of the Valley districts (Imphal West and Imphal East) has been extended over the decades to include the river valleys that feed into Imphal, thus encroaching into the hill areas which otherwise belonged to the Kangpokpi district. These extensions are controversial, causing uncertain borders between the valley districts and Kangpokpi district.

A portion of the Iril River valley (also called Saikul Valley) has been part of Imphal East since 1971, but the census map of 2001 shows it extending almost up to the border of the Saikul Town. The Khamenlok valley is a branch valley of the Saikul Valley, extending from a village called Uyumpok. Near the mouth of the valley is a Meitei village called Nongsum, (Note: Alternative spellings: Nongshum, Nungshum.) and, next to it, a Tangkhul Naga village called Khongbal Tangkhul (population: 415). These two are included in the Imphal East district. The remainder of the Khamenlok Valley has numerous Kuki villages, which are part of the Kangpokpi district. These are, in order, H. Khopibung, Khamenlok, Chullouphai, Aigejang, A. Leikot, A. Phainom, Thombol, T. Jordanphai, Songjang and Govajang (total population: 1815). (Note: The 2011 census of the Senapati district lists the villages of H. Khopibung (population: 208), Khamenlok (population: 241), Challouphai (population: 120), Aigejang (population: 412), D. Leikot (population: 215), Thombol (population: 107), Jordanphai (population: 169), Songjang (population: 183), and Govajang (population: 160). It also lists the Khongbal Tangkhul village, exemplifying the confusion over district boundaries.)

Within the Imphal East district, Uyumpok is a large village with numerous sub-villages (total population: 2899), and to its north is Sagolmang (population: 967). Sagolmang has a police station, whose jurisdiction extends to the Khamenlok Valley, even though the latter is in a different revenue district. Thus, the Imphal East police were responsible for law and order in the Khamenlok area. They were also the main source of news for the media.

During the month of May 2023, the villagers of Nongsum complained of firing and intimidation by the Kuki villagers of Khamenlok. One village defence volunteer said that the villagers "will stay firm and take the fight to the Kuki militants".

== Clashes ==
=== 12 June ===
On Monday, 12 June, by 10:45 am, armed assailants raided the Khopibung and Khamenlok villages, firing at the "group of civilians", and setting houses on fire. By the time Assam Rifles and Gorkha Rifles troops arrived at the village, the gunmen are said to have fled the area. The Times of India report said that three people were injured. Other news reported that clashes continued till late evening, and nine people were injured in total, receiving bullet wounds. The Imphal Free Press provided the information that, as soon as the news about the gun battle was circulated, "women folks" (Meira Paibis) in the Khurai Lamlong Keithel area (a suburb of Imphal City on the route to Khamenlok) blocked the roads, so that the (central) armed forces could not reach the area. Indian Reserve Battalion (IRB) commandos, made up of Meitei personnel, are said to have reached the spot, however.

In contradiction to the above reports, Sagolmang police claimed that "suspected Kuki militants" from Khopibung and Khamenlok villages were attacking the Nongsum village, and that the latter's "village volunteers" were defending themselves, despite admitting that the gunfight was taking place at the Khamenlok village. Having reproduced these claims, the Imphal Free Press corrected itself two days later by admitting that the Kuki villages were "already ... burnt down by village volunteers". This portrayal of "Kuki militants" and "(Meitei) village volunteers" was later criticised by the Indian Army, which said that the (Meitei) assailants were a "mob".

The chief of Khopibung also criticised the Imphal media reports stating that the Kuki villagers were "scattered" (fled from the villages into the hills) and he was having to spend great efforts for gathering them again. He also revealed that four Kuki village volunteers had received bullet injuries.

=== 13–14 June ===
On 13 June, an estimated mob of 3,000 people went to attack the Khamenlok valley, some carrying sophisticated weapons. According to the Imphal Free Press, after a few hours of firing, the villages Khopibung, Khamenlok, Aigejang and Chullouphai were burnt down. However, the village chiefs of the area said that all the Kuki villages in Khamenlok valley sustained destruction. Meitei women's groups again blocked roads and also blew up mobile towers, so that armed forces could not reach the area, and communications also became unavailable.

Late in the night, after 10 pm, while the Meitei mobs were celebrating or resting, Kuki villagers descended from the hills and attacked the Meiteis. They were described as coming with guns, spears, daggers, cleavers and other traditional weapons. Early reports the next day said that eleven Meiteis were killed, and 23 Meiteis were injured. Later, the figures were revised down to nine killed and ten injured. In addition, five people were declared to be missing. In contrast to the official narrative, the Kuki village chiefs said "scores of well-armed Meiteis" were killed. The General Secretary of Kuki People's Alliance estimated that 200–300 Meiteis might have been killed, based on the number of weapons the Kukis recovered from the victims.

The nine people who were officially declared killed, came from villages in valley districts such as Leimakhong, Khurai, Pangei and Ningthemcha. They also included a 32-year-old woman. None of them were local to the Khamenlok region. The Hindu described the Kuki attack as a "retaliatory strike by village guards", while the Imphal-based media continued calling them "Kuki militants", who supposedly attacked "(Meitei) village volunteers".

The official narrative said that the nine Meitei people killed were in a church building in the village of Aigejang. The surviving victims claimed that they had gone to deliver food to the Meitei mobs, while the Meitei fighters themselves were supposedly at other locations.

== Aftermath ==
On 20 June, thousands of Kuki villagers including those from the Khamenlok area protested in Saikul, saying ten villages of Khamenlok were burnt down. They questioned the prime minister's silence and sought his immediate intervention.

On 24 June, a memorial was held for the nine Meitei people killed in the clash. The Meitei activist group Eramdam Kanba Lup (EKAL) urged the government to declare Khamenlok a Protected Forest and to establish a "war cemetery" for the killed fighters. The president of the Meetei Peace Committee emphasised upholding the "spirit of patriotism" embodied in the nine fighters and the responsibility to safeguard "Manipur's integrity".

Previously, the Coordinating Committee on Manipur Integrity (COCOMI), characterised the Kuki fighters as "narco-terrorists" and declared that the sacrifices made by Meitei civilian volunteers would not go in vain. The Indigenous Tribal Leaders Forum countered the narrative, and questioned how the supposedly innocent civilians die in tribal Kuki-Zo villages. Kuki Inpi Manipur also blamed COCOMI for its "open war declaration" which it said provoked the attacks on Kuki villages. (Note: COCOMI had declared a "national war against Chin-Kuki narcoterrorists" on 7 June. It valorised violence claiming that all victims would be solemnised as "the brave sons and daughters of the Motherland Manipur".) The organisation also claimed that chief minister N. Biren Singh was at the Nongsum village adjacent to the Khamenlok area when Songjang and Govajang villages were being attacked and burnt.

The News Minute wrote in August that, even two months after the clash, journalists were not allowed access to the Khamenlok area. Meitei vigilante groups including Meira Paibis made sure that nobody entered the villages. Police claimed that the area was dangerous as it was infested with "militants from Myanmar" who would shoot down any journalists entering it. They also pointed to bunkers on hilltops, which they claimed belonged to "Kuki militants". However, The News Minute found that the bunkers belonged to the Indian Army. The vigilantes also prevented the journalists from talking to Army personnel. The Kuki villagers who fled the area and were then living in relief camps said, "there is nothing left in the villages. They burnt everything down".

Kuki parties blamed the Meitei militia Arambai Tenggol for speearheading the attacks on their villages. Cadres of the Meitei insurgent group United National Liberation Front (UNLF) were also said to have been involved.

=== Editors Guild of India investigation ===
On 12 July, the Indian Army's Information Warfare wing wrote to the Editors Guild of India, raising the issue of bias in Imphal media. The reporting on Khamenlok clash was cited as one of the examples of biased reporting. The letter cited a "mob" attacking the Khamenlok village and the adjoining areas, which was duly supported by womenfolk (Meira Paibis) that blocked Army troops from reaching the village. After carrying out arson of multiple villages, the members of the mob or those supporting them were killed in a "retaliatory strike". Notwithstanding the truth, the letter said that the newspapers in Imphal covered the incident as civilians being killed by "Kuki militants". This and other similar examples were "outright (mis)representation of facts", the Army said, and saw such reporting as a major contributor to the instigation of further violence. It invited the Editors Guild of India to investigate the media bias of Imphal media.

The Editors Guild of India sent a team of three senior editors who investigated the allegations and confirmed that the Imphal media reported fake news and spread disinformation, which progressively deepened the ethnic divide in Manipur. Their report also called out the Imphal media for vilifying security forces, which was being tacitly supported by the state government and Manipur Police. In the section titled "Fake News and Disinformation", the report wrote:

13 June: There was an attack on Kuki villages of Khamenlok and adjoining areas on June 12, supported by Meitei women folk in the mob. Some members of both sides, without any intervention of the security forces, were blocked by the Meitei women folk from reaching the burning villages. Few amongst those who got killed were not locals and had been killed elsewhere in the counter-attacks the following day by the Kukis. The Manipur media inverted the role of the Meitei mobs and reported the incidents as being instigated by “Kuki militants” who attacked and killed Meiteis.

This was one among a dozen examples cited for fake news and disinformation.

The chief minister N. Biren Singh reacted angrily to the report claiming that the Editors Guild of India had "no authority" to constitute a fact-finding team and carry out an investigation in Manipur. He directed the state government to file an FIR against the members of the Editors Guild who, he claimed, were "trying to create more clashes" in Manipur. The Editors Guild moved the Supreme Court of India, which protected them from arrest. The Supreme Court also grilled the complainants, challenging them how the offences cited for the Editors Guild could be substantiated. "Your entire complaint is a counter-narrative of the government", said the Supreme Court, ruling that the Editors Guild was entitled to freedom of speech.
