= 57th Mountain Division =

- Active: 1966-onwards
- Country: India
- Branch: Indian Army
- Type: Infantry
- Role: Mountain warfare, Counterinsurgency
- Size: Division
- Part of: III Corps
- Garrison/HQ: Leimakhong, Manipur
- Nickname: Red Shield Division

Commanders
- Current commander: Major General Sumit Kabthiyal, SM

The 57 Mountain Division headquarters are at Leimakhong near Imphal, Manipur.

== History ==
It was raised in 1966 for counterinsurgency operations in Mizoram. Until 1990, headquartered at Aizawl with III Corps.Previously the division was headquartered in Masimpur near Silchar. 57th Mountain Division took part in the Indo-Pakistani War of 1971 as part of IV Corps. It also successfully conducted Operation Golden Bird in 1995 to eliminate rebels in Northeast India.

== Areas Served ==
The formation and units of the Division operates in some of the remote corner of Manipur along with Indo-Burmese border. It cooperates with Assam Rifles Imphal Sector wing for any insurgency in Manipur.

== Previous Commander ==
- Maj. Gen. Iqbal Singh (2001)
