= Leisang =

Leisang is a village in Kangpokpi district in the Indian state of Manipur. It is in a mountainous location and is inaccessible to vehicles; in April 2018 it was the last village in the country to be electrified.

== Population ==
At the 2011 Census of India, there were 12 families and 65 people in Leisang. As of March 2019 there are 13 families and 70 people, all Kuki.

== Location ==
Leisang is 3 kilometres (1.9 mi) from a motorable road, and can only be reached on foot or by bicycle, by means of a steep track that is sometimes very muddy. The closest town, Kangpokpi, is 35 kilometres (22 mi) away. The closest primary school is 1.5 kilometres (0.93 mi) away. The village is near a bend on the Tuitha River; the only source of potable water is a stream flowing through the village. There are also no medical facilities; emergency cases such as women in labour must be carried to the road. At a public meeting in the state capital, Imphal, in May 2018 the villagers requested a road connection, water purification facilities, and an anganwadi childcare and health centre.

== History ==
The village was established in 1996 and originally called Leisang Khonomphai or L. Khonomphai. It was recognised in 2002. Formerly in Senapati district, it became part of the newly formed Kangpokpi district in late 2016.

Nearby villages were electrified in 2017. On 27 April 2018, electricity was turned on in Leisang for the first time, the culmination of the thousand-day Deendayal Upadhyaya Gram Jyoti Yojana program to electrify all the remaining villages of India announced by Prime Minister Narendra Modi in his speech on Independence Day in 2015. As of March 2019 service remains erratic, with outages as long as three months caused in part by the difficulty of access to make repairs, but some villagers have acquired televisions.
