= Khokon (village) =

Khokon Khokawn
- village
- Location in Manipur, India Khokon (India)
- Coordinates: 24°59′33.3″N 093°59′47.8″E
- Country: India
- State: Manipur
- District: Kangpokpi
- Founder: Ngulthong Haokip

Government
  - Type: Village council
  - Body: Village council
- Time zone: UTC+5:30 (IST)
- PIN: 795114
- Telephone code: +91385-
- Vehicle registration: MN
- Sex ratio: 980 (2011)
- Literacy: 70%
- Website: kangpokpi.nic.in

Khokon (also spelled as Khokawn) is a Kuki village in the Kangpokpi district of Manipur, India. As per Census of India 2011, there are 33 household with a total population of 189 persons, out of which 96 are male while 93 are female.

== Etymology ==
The term Khokon means a zig-zag village.

== History ==
The Kuki village of Khokon was originally established in the 1900s in the then Ukhrul subdivision of Manipur (roughly coinciding with the present-day Ukhrul district). It was situated between two Tangkhul villages Kachai and Sumdal, which had ongoing rivalries between them. Khokon was established on a hill top between the two villages with the encouragement of the then state administration, under the leadership of chief Paokhoson Haokip. The villagers of Khokon, using their armed strength, controlled the two warring villages in the Ukhrul subdivision, and as a result brought about the much needed peace and tranquility in the area. In post-independence India, the rising Naga nationalism and militancy led some of the Tangkhul nationalists to serve quit notice to Khokon villagers forgetting their contribution in the past. Their village was burnt down by Naga nationalists in 1961. The villagers were forced to leave their homes in 1961. Scholar Thongkholal Haokip notes that the erstwhile villagers of Khokon are now spread out all over the state of Manipur.

The then Khokon village chief Ngulthong Haokip later established a new village under the same name in the Saikul subdivision of Sadar Hills (now Kangpokpi district).

== Location ==
Khokon village is located at 24°59'33.3"N latitude, and 93°59'47.8"E longitude. It is situated at a height of 790 m above sea level, and just about 35 Kilometres from Imphal, the capital city of Manipur.

== Literacy ==
As per the Census of India 2011, Khokon has a literacy rate of 56.68%, out of which the male population is 61.05% and female is 52.17%.

== Church ==
The people in the village had been largely converted during the 19th century, and they are affiliated to Kuki Baptist Convention, a Baptist Kuki denomination in Northeast India.

== Occupation ==
Even though Khokonites were traditionally cultivators and animal rearers, with the passage of time they largely shifted to small businesses and other skilled professions such as knitting and yarning. The educated ones are engaged in teaching and research in various universities of India and also as medical practitioners. A sections of youths also migrated to different metropolitan cities in the country to work in various companies and BPOs.
