= Lassan =

Lassan may refer to:

- Lassan (music), the slow section of a rhapsody
- Lassan, Germany, a town in Vorpommern-Greifswald, Mecklenburg-Western Pomerania, Germany
- Lassan, character portrayed by Gursewak Singh in the 2025 Indian film Dhurandhar

== See also ==
- Lasan, an Indian restaurant located in Birmingham, England
- Lasan, the fictional home planet of the Lasat species in Star Wars
