= Rajiv Gandhi Grameen Vidyutikaran Yojana =

Rajiv Gandhi Grameen Vidyutikaran Yojana (RGGVY)

Agency overview
- Formed: 2005
- Motto: Switch On India

Rajiv Gandhi Grameen Vidyutikaran Yojana (RGGVY) or Rural Electricity Infrastructure and Household Electrification Scheme was launched in 2005 with the aim to provide electricity to all rural areas.

In 2013, an amount of Rs. 198.98 crore was sanctioned to the Gorkhaland Territorial Administration (GTA) under this scheme which was later renamed as Deendayal Upadhyaya Gram Jyoti Yojana and recently as "saubhagya" This scheme aimed at electrifying all villages and habitations, Providing access to electricity to all rural households andProviding electricity connection to Below Poverty Line (BPL) families free of charge. To augment resource capacities for implementation of this scheme, Ministry of Power, Govt. of India involved CPSUs like NTPC, NHPC, PGCIL and DVC for making available their project management expertise and capabilities to the states willing to use their services. Anyishi Youth Association (ANYA) claimed that there were scams involved the CM under Rajiv Gandhi Grameen Vidyutikaran Yojana (RGGVY) scheme.

As in April 2015, only 910 villages were yet to be electrified, accounting for 5% of India's un-electrified villages excluding some uninhabited villages but around 35 million households i.e., approximately 11% of the total rural households were yet to be electrified. The last of these remote villages were connected to the grid in the early 2020s.
