= Yaingangpokpi =

Village in Manipur, India

- Interactive map of Yaingangpokpi
- Location in Manipur, India Yaingangpokpi (India)
- Coordinates: 24.9118°N 94.1206°E
- Country: India
- State: Manipur
- District: Imphal East

Area
  - Total: 200 km^{2} (77 sq mi)

Population (2011)
  - Total: 3,765

Language(s)
  - Official: Meitei (Manipuri)
- Time zone: UTC+5:30 (IST)

Yaingangpokpi (YKPI) is a village in the Imphal East District of Manipur, India. It is 24 km from Imphal at the northeastern corner of Imphal Valley. It is regarded as the centre of a "bowl", surrounded by hills on all sides except for the few valleys that pass through the village. The major ethnic groups within the village are Meitei, Tangkhul. The Tangkhuls live in the adjoining village of New Canaan.

== Geography ==
Yaingangpokpi is at the northeastern corner of the Imphal Valley. It lies at the intersection of two valleys: one that runs north–south and brings down a stream called Leima Khong, and another that runs northeast–southwest and carries the NH 202 towards Ukhrul. The streams coming from both the valleys pass through Yaingangpokpi, but Leima Khong is the larger one.

Adjoining Yaingangpokpi on the north is Thamnapokpi and next to it is Sanasabi, both substantial villages. To the northeast is Gwaltabi and to the southwest is Sabungkhok Khunou. The Army refers to the entire region as the"Yaingangpokpi bowl" ("YKPI bowl"). All its villages are enumerated together in the census under the name Laikot. (Note: It is unclear if "Laikot" is an actual village by itself, since it is not listed among the villages under the local gram panchayat (village council). Neither is it mentioned in news reports.) Their combined population (listed under "Laikot" in the 2011 census, was 3,765, with 226 people belonging to Scheduled Tribes (mostly Tangkhul Nagas). This total also includes other villages such as Seijang, which are not part of the "Yaingangpokpi bowl".

The hill areas lining the valleys are in the Kangpokpi district, with numerous villages populated by Kuki-Zo people. (Note: Kuki-Zo people are also often referred to as simply as "Kuki people". This is especially the case for Thadou Kukis, who are predominant in the Kangpokpi district.) Particularly noteworthy is a hill called Uyok Ching which is due west of Thamnapokpi. The Kuki-Zo people in the villages around it used it as a strategic ridge for defensive purposes during the 2023–2025 Manipur violence. To the south of Uyok Ching in a small branch valley are villages called Twichin and P. Phaimol. (Note: P. Phaimol is often referred to as Sangaren by Meitei sources.) To the northwest is a village called Saibol. To the east of Thamnapokpi and Sanasabi, behind a ridge, are the villages of Kh. Phaipijang and Urangpat. To the south of Urangpat, along NH 202, is Gwaltabi Kuki, the Kuki portion of the Gwaltabi village in Kangpokpi district. Kuki villages also abound in the valley to the north of Sanasabi, which appears to be part of the Kangpokpi district.

Yaingangpokpi has a police station. All the villages of Imphal East mentioned above fall under its jurisdiction.

== 2023–2025 Manipur violence ==
On 3 May 2023, major ethnic violence broke out between the Meitei and Kuki-Zo communities of Manipur. Within weeks over 100 people died and 60,000 people got displaced. All the Kuki-Zo people in the Imphal Valley and the Meitei people in the Kuki-Zo-dominated hill districts were forced to flee to the other side. Tensions also erupted in the Yaingangpokpi area as the valleys are surrounded by Kuki-dominated hill villages. The villagers in the valley areas demanded adequate security and cautioned that if it was not provided, they would take every necessary measure to protect their villages.

The first sign of trouble appeared on 28 May. The Hindustan Times reported that armed men came down to Yaingangpokpi, torched two houses and fired upon villagers. The Ukhrul Times, on the other hand, reported that ten houses were torched, mostly in the Gwaltabi area. (Gwaltabi has a Meitei portion and a Kuki portion divided across the two districts.) The Meiteis evidently retaliated and burnt down numerous Kuki houses in the villages of P. Phaimol, Twichin and a "new village" close to them. The Committee on Tribal Unity (CoTU) (Note: Committee on Tribal Unity is the main civil society organisation representing the Kuki-Zo people in Kangpokpi district.) later said that Meitei mobs led by Arambai Tenggol and Manipur Police Commandos were responsible for the burning. Ukhrul Times also cited sources stating that 50 houses were burnt down in "Gwaltabi". Satellite imagery reveals that most of the destruction was in the Gwaltabi Kuki village. The next day, the Army said that it conducted operations in Sanasabi, Gwaltabi and Sabungkhok Khunou and apprehended 22 miscreants, many with weapons.

In June, the Army mentioned that Urangpat and Gwaltabi (Kuki villages) had been vacated and security forces were deployed in them. Rumours were circulated on social media that 1,000 miscreants had assembled in parts of Kangpokpi district, especially in these two villages. The Army reported that the villages were fired upon and that the security forces responded. It also mentioned that large groups of women from Yaingangpokpi and Seijang villages blocked force reinforcements from coming to the area.

In October, a similar attempt was made to attack the Twichin and P. Phaimol villages (which had been mostly burnt down in May). The security forces stationed in the "buffer zone" blocked the attackers and repelled them. Women groups again obstructed security forces at Sabungkhok until all the attackers coming from Imphal (in 30–40 vehicles) passed through. The Sangai Express mentioned that the security forces had lathi-charged the womenfolk, and nine of them had to be hospitalised.

The Imphal-based media (Note: The Imphal media had turned into "Meitei media" with the onset of the violence, according to a report by the Editors Guild of India.) reported few of these attacks on the Kuki villages, but mentioned regular attacks by "Kuki militants" on the valley villages "at least once or twice a month".

=== Saibol post ===
The Saibol village, which might have escaped the first wave of conflict, was mentioned in February 2024. There was reportedly firing between two armed groups along "Saibol heights", which is evidently a reference to the Uyok Ching ridge. Two people were killed, and three people were injured including a junior commissioned officer.

During the summer of 2024, the term "Saibol post" began to be used on social media. There was exchange of fire between those manning the heights and the Meitei village volunteers in the valley. On 8 August, it was reported that the Manipur Government had ordered the removal of the hilltop posts. The Kuki women from the entire region protested in massive numbers. There was exchange of fire again in November injuring a soldier and a Tangkhul Naga farmer from New Canaan. On 29 November, Meitei village committees in the region wrote to the Union Home Ministry and Defence Ministry, expressing concern over the "illegal bunkers" set up on the Uyok Ching ridge and alleged Army's complicity in allowing their construction. They have also asked the Army forces in the region to be replaced by Central Armed Police Forces (CAPF).

A gunfight at the locality was reported on 24 December, the Christmas Eve, continuing over the following days. On 28 December, four people were injured including a Manipur Police Commando and an Impact News cameraperson. Chief Minister N. Biren Singh condemned the incident, blaming it on "Kuki militants". Kuki-Zo Council, the apex civil society body of the community, also issued a condemnation, placing the blame on the valley-based insurgent groups (Meitei insurgent groups), who were said to have attacked the area in the midst of Christmas celebrations. (The Kuki-Zo community is overwhelmingly Christian.)

On 29 December, the central forces BSF and CRPF conducted a combing operation on the Uyok Ching hill, destroying four bunkers and occupying three other bunkers. This caused a furore among the Kuki-Zo community. Hundreds of women from the region came to the site forming human barriers to prevent the security forces. CoTU conducted a 12-hour shutdown across the Kangpokpi district and a public protest at Gamgiphai. The women continued to protest what they called the "forceful occupation" of community bunkers. The forces used tear gas to disperse the protesters, which is said to have turned the site into a "battlefield". Many women were injured, needing medical attention. One of them was hit with a rubber bullet in the left eye, causing her to lose eyesight. Some 40–50 women were said to have been injured. A massive public protest was held in the Kangpokpi Town, which also turned violent causing injuring to protesters as well policemen. CoTU also put in place a blockade of National Highway 2, which lasted five days. It was called off after the government reportedly agreed to replace the central forces along the Saibol Post with those from a Kangpokpi-based CRPF battalion.

== See also ==
- List of ultras of Southeast Asia
