= Deen Dayal Upadhyaya Gram Jyoti Yojana =

Government of India scheme designed to provide continuous power supply to rural India

Deen Dayal Upadhyaya Gram Jyoti Yojana (DDUGJY)
- Country: India
- Prime Minister(s): Narendra Modi
- Ministry: Power
- Key people: Piyush Goyal
- Launched: 2014
- Budget: ₹756 billion (US$8.1 billion)
- Status: Rural electrification target completed. Other works like System Strengthening etc. ongoing and expected to be completed before December 2018
- Website: http://www.ddugjy.gov.in/

Deen Dayal Upadhyaya Gram Jyoti Yojana is a Government of India scheme designed to provide continuous electricity supply to rural India. The government plans to invest ₹756 billion (US$8.1 billion) for rural electrification under this scheme. The scheme replaced the existing Rajiv Gandhi Grameen Vidyutikaran Yojana.

The scheme will enable to initiate much awaited reforms in the rural areas. It focuses on feeder separation (rural households and agricultural) and strengthening of sub-transmission and distribution infrastructure including metering at all levels in rural areas. This will help in providing round the clock power to rural households and adequate power to agricultural consumers. The earlier scheme for rural electrification viz. Rajiv Gandhi Grameen Vidyutikaran Yojana has been subsumed in the new scheme as its rural electrification component.

The Ministry of Power has launched a new app, GARV-II app to provide real-time data of all six lakh villages of the country. The app is envisaged to ensure transparency in the implementation of rural electrification programme. The new app will also enable the citizens to participate in the developmental works and can give their feedback and inputs related to the rural electrification programme. The participation of Citizens will enable public scrutiny of the rural electrification programmes. In addition, the village-wise works sanctioned under Deen Dayal Upadhyaya Gram Jyoti Yojana has been mapped to scrutinise the progress of work carried out under the project in each village.

The deadline for the Centre's rural electrification programme was May 2018. However, it was achieved before the deadline on 28 April, with the electrification of Leisang village in Manipur. Prime Minister of India, Narendra Modi tweeted "Yesterday, we fulfilled a commitment due to which the lives of several Indians will be transformed forever! I am delighted that every single village of India now has access to electricity." Despite this, several news reports claimed that the numbers were inflated, and villages were electrified only on paper.
