= Saikul =

- Village
- Interactive map of Saikul
- Location in Manipur, India Saikul (India)
- Coordinates: 25.0602°N 94.0284°E
- Country: India
- State: Manipur
- District: Kangpokpi

Government
  - Body: Sadar Hills Autonomous District Council
- Elevation: 810 m (2,660 ft)

Population (2011)
  - Total: 2,767
- Time zone: UTC+5:30 (IST)
- PIN: 795118
- Telephone code: +91385-
- Vehicle registration: MN
- Sex ratio: 980 (2011)
- Literacy: 70%

Saikul is a town in the Kangpokpi district in Manipur, India. It is the headquarters of "Sadar Hills East" subdivision (or Saikul subdivision) of the Kangpokpi district, and one of the principal towns under the Sadar Hills Autonomous District Council. It is also the seat of the Saikul Assembly constituency, a reserved constituency for Scheduled Tribes.

== Geography ==
Saikul is on the bank of the Iril River (also called Jildung River), near its junction with a tributary called Ichai Lok that flows down from northwest. Saikul is on the right bank of Iril, while another village called Makokchung is on the left bank, opposite to Saikul.

Saikul is 40 kilometres north of the Imphal city, and 14 kilometres north of Sagolmang, which is also on the bank of the Iril River in the Imphal East district.

In the 2011 census, Saikul has a population of 2,767 people, almost all of whom belong to Scheduled Tribes. Makokching has a population of 505.

== History ==
Saikul was listed as "Samusang Saikul" in the annexure of Manipur Hill People's Regulation of 1947, in the North Area of Sadar Circle No. 1. It had 11 households at that time. The location of the village is however uncertain. During the British colonial period, most hill villages were located on hill tops and were engaged in shifting cultivation on hill slopes as well as wet-cultivation in the valley below.

In 1956, the village was listed as simply "Saikal", while "Samu Song" was listed as a separate village. This might indicate that the village moved down to the Iril River valley.

In 1969, when the Mao and Sadar Hills district was formed (later known as "Manipur North" district or Senapati district), Saikul served as the headquarters of the Sadar Hills subdivision. This gave Saikul significant prominence, leading its growth into a populous town in subsequent decades.

By 1981, the Sadar Hills area was divided into two subdivisions. Sadar Hills East was headquartered at Saikul, whereas Sadar Hills West was headquartered at Kangpokpi.

From 1974 onwards, there have been a persistent demand to separate Sadar Hills into a separate district. After several failed attempts, this was eventually accomplished in 2016, when the Sadar Hills area was spun out as the Kangpokpi district, with headquarters at Kangpokpi. The district had three subdivisions when formed, with Saikul Subdivision being one of them, covering roughly the same area as the earlier Sadar Hills East.

Between 1991 and 2001, the district boundary of the Imphal East district was arbitrarily enlarged so as to cover almost the entire Iril river valley and many of its branch valleys. The Saikul Town itself appears as if it is a geographical part of the Imphal East district (Sawombung Subdivision), even though it is administratively part of the Kangpokpi district (then Senapati district).
