= Lasan =

Coordinates: 52.4851°N 1.9079°W

- Interactive map of Lasan

Restaurant information
- Established: April 2002
- Owners: Jabbar Khan
- Chef: Aysan Shaikh; Muraliraj Narashimaraj; Khalid Sami Khan
- Food type: Indian cuisine
- Location: 3-4 Dakota Buildings, James Street, St Paul's Square, Birmingham, West Midlands, England, B3 1SD, United Kingdom
- Seating capacity: 64
- Website: www.lasan.co.uk

Lasan (Hindi: लसन, romanized: lasan, lit. 'garlic') is an Indian restaurant located in St Paul's Square, Jewellery Quarter, Birmingham, England, and was co-founded by Aktar Islam and Jabbar Khan in 2002. In 2009, it became the first Indian restaurant in the United Kingdom to be selected as the "Best Local Restaurant" by Gordon Ramsay on Channel 4's The F Word.

== History ==
In April 2002, British Bangladeshi entrepreneur, Jabbar Khan, founded Lasan in St Paul's Square, Jewellery Quarter, Birmingham. Aktar Islam joined in 2009 and left Lasan group in 2017. The 64-seater restaurant serves modern, contemporary Indian cuisine with modern and minimalist décor and was the first Indian restaurant in Birmingham that did not serve Balti.

In 2010, Lasan, won the "Best Local Indian Restaurant" category for Lasan on Channel 4's The F Word after beating Curry Corner from Cheltenham in the semi-final. They then went on to win the overall final, after beating The Pheasant from Keystone. Islam and Shaikh cooked a selection of three dishes for 50 food critics, scoring 70 out of 100 to The Pheasant's 61.

== Awards and recognition ==
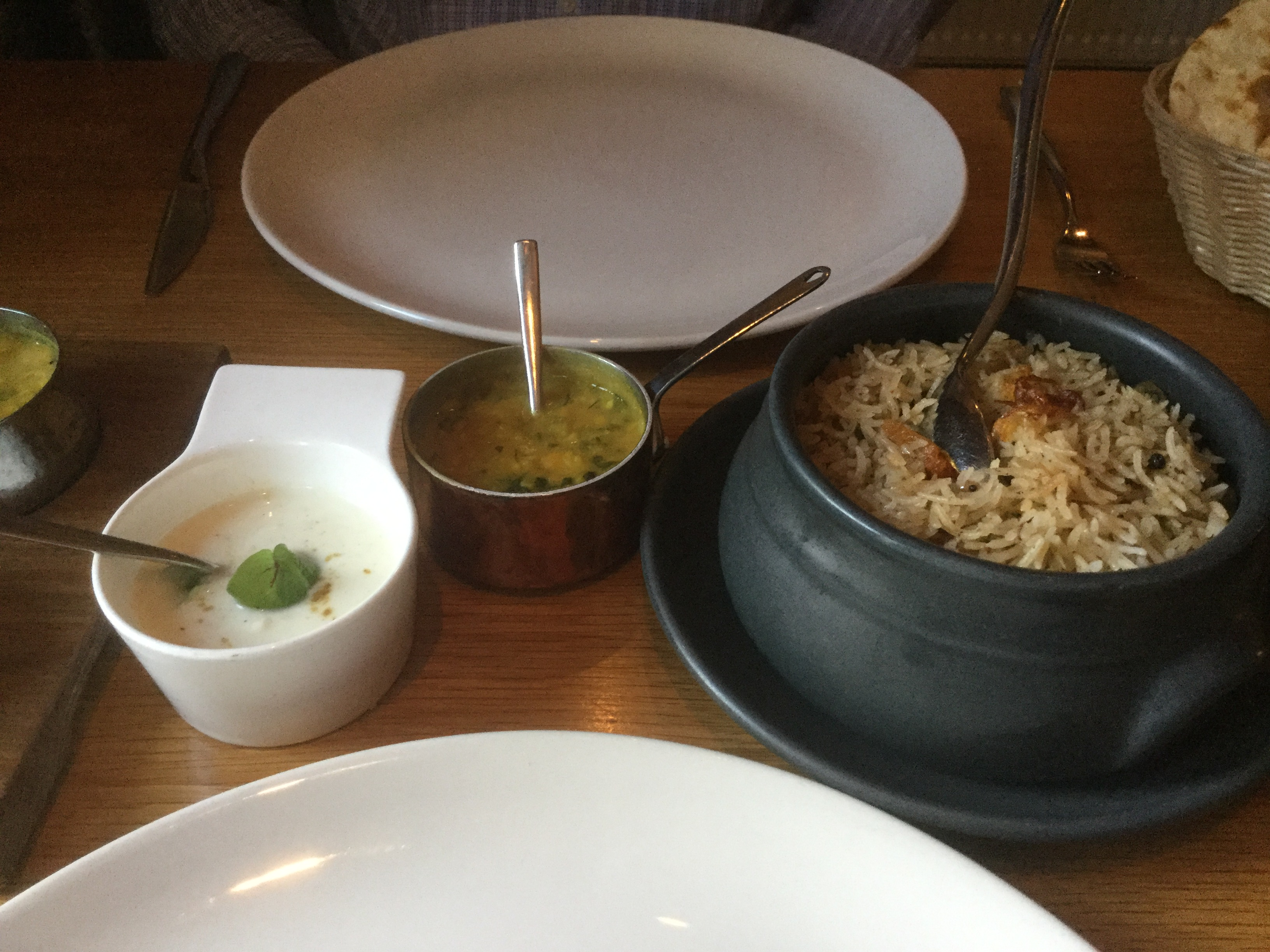
Hydrabadi Biryani with lentils and raita, at Lasan

In 2007, 2008, 2009 and 2010, Lasan was awarded first place in the Midlands category at The British Curry Awards.

In 2008, the restaurant was awarded Best Hospitality Business of the Year at the Asian Business Awards and Best Service and Rising Star at Taste of Birmingham. In 2009, it was awarded Healthiest Restaurant Awards and the Institute of Asian Business Award. In the same year, it was awarded the Taste Award for Best Service in the West Midlands by Men's Health magazine's Healthiest Restaurant Awards for its healthy cooking techniques and aromatic flavours with fresh spices and herbs rather than fat. In 2013, it was awarded Best Restaurant at Asian Business Awards.

Lasan was voted one of the Top 10 Indian Restaurants in the UK by The Independent and The Times. It was listed on 'The Sunday Times 100 Restaurants in Britain' at no. 49, becoming the first Indian restaurant outside London to be included. It was also included in the Michelin Guide. In 2010, it was cited by The New York Times as one of the reasons why Birmingham was one of its must-visit cities. In March that year, it was listed as one of the Top 10 restaurants in the Midlands by The Guardian. In January 2012, it received the No.1 spot in Birmingham Mail Top Ten of the best curry houses in Birmingham. In 2014, it was listed as one of the top 10 Indian restaurants in Birmingham by Birmingham Mail.

== See also ==
- Business of British Bangladeshis
