= Irang River =

River in northeastern India

Coordinates: 24°37′9.99″N 93°24′12.94″E

- Location within India

Location
- Country: India
- State: Manipur

Physical characteristics
- Mouth

Irang River is a river in Manipur in northeastern India flows into the Barak River and is found in the northeastern state of Manipur, India. It flows through hilly terrain and dense forest, supporting both biodiversity and local livelihoods.
