= Leimakhong =

Town in Manipur, India

Coordinates: 24.9430°N 93.8399°E

Leimakhong is a small town in the Kangpokpi district (Note: Prior to 2017 it was in the Sadar Hills region of the Senapati district,) in Manipur, India. It is on Kangpokpi's border with the Imphal West district, approximately 30Km west of the Imphal city. It is on the bank of the Leimakhong River (Note: Sometimes referred to as "Tumu Lairembi" river), a tributary of the Imphal River. The town is inhabited by Kuki, Nepali and Meitei communities. According to the 2011 census, the town had a population of 3544 of which 25 percent are Scheduled Tribes.

Leimakhong contains the headquarters of the 57th Mountain Division of the Indian Army. The military hospital in the divisional headquarters has been often used to treat injured personnel and civilians.

== Villages ==
Some of the villages in Leimakhong are:

- Leimakhong Bazar
- Prem Nagar
- Chingmang
- P moulding
- Khunkho
- Dwarka

== Power generation ==
Leimakhong has the distinction of housing the original power generation capacity of Manipur dating back to 1930. Two micro hydro-electric power stations with capacities of 100 KW and 56 KW were installed here. The original power station was washed way due to a land slide in June 1962.

At present, Leimakhong has a micro hydro-electric power station with a capacity 600 KW and a furnace oil-based (heavy fuel-based) power house with a capacity of 36 MW. The cost of the latter is said to be abnormally high. In addition, there are several diesel power houses on standby for emergency usage.

In January 2024, in the midst of 2023–2024 Manipur violence, the furnace oil from the power station is said to have leaked. It contaminated the Leimakhong river, causing a serious environmental concern.

== Bibliography ==
- 24 X 7 Power for All – Manipur (PDF), Government of India. Ministry of Power, 2023
