= Iril River =

River in India

Coordinates: 24.798°N 93.975°E

The Iril River (Meitei: Iril Turel) is a river that runs through the eastern suburbs of the city of Imphal in the state of Manipur, India. Dolathabi Barrage Project is on the river at Leitanpokpi village.

== Etymology ==
The name Iril derives from two words Ee and Rei/Ree. The Meitei word Ee, which means blood, although "Ee" is also the first syllable in the Meitei word for anything "water" related such as "Ee-shing" which simply means water. So words suffixed with the syllable "Ee" can also denote different forms of water e.g. "ee-ram" (path of water), ee-phut" (spring), "ee-mai" (water surface), "ee-chel" (speed of running water) etc. And the word Rei/Ree, means river. Literally translated, it could be Iril indicates "river of blood", but more likely, since both the syllables in this bi-syllabic word indicate water or river in two different languages, it could simply still mean a river, and probably does, considering the context.

== Course ==
Iril River originates near the Lakhamai village in Senapati district. It flows through Ngamju, Saikul, Sagolmang area, Lamlai, Top, Naharup, Pangong, and Irilbung before it joins with the Imphal River near Lilong.

It is fed with fresh water from the streams, very clear. The water supplies a plant located in Porompat. It is one of the headstreams of the Manipur River. The Iril River still has a large population of endangered indigenous fish called ngaton, Meitei sareng. These fish are captured by local fishermen in July and August.
