= Kuki Baptist Convention =

Christian denomination in Northeast India

- Classification: Christianity, Protestant, Baptist
- Orientation: Trinitarian, New Testament Christianity
- Leader: Rev. Dr. Thongkhosei Haokip (General Secretary)
- Associations: Manipur Baptist Convention
- Region: Manipur, Assam
- Founder: T. Lunkim, Seikholet Singson, Hawlngam Haokip
- Origin: 16 March 1958; Tujangwaichong, Manipur
- Members: 28431 (Baptized members, 2018)
- Ministers: 50
- Missionaries: 55
- Places of worship: 21 Centre churches
- Secondary schools: 4
- Official website: kbc.org.in

Kuki Baptist Convention (KBC) is a Baptist Christian denomination in Northeast India. It is associated with the Manipur Baptist Convention.

== History ==
The Kuki Baptist Convention (KBC) was established at Tujangwaichong village in the present day Kangpokpi district on 16 March 1958. The Gospel Mission Society, presently known as the Mission Board was established in 1988 with Capt.Retd. Lalkholun as its president and Rev Yangthong Haokip as its first Secretary. At present, the congregation has 32 missionaries and 20 native Evangelists serving in different fields. As in 2018 KBCs consists of 21 parish, with 293 villages, 9092 household with a budget is Rs. 12,000,000.
