= Ireng Naga =

Village in Manipur, India

Ireng Naga Puilong
- Interactive map of Ireng Naga
- Location in Manipur, India Ireng Naga (India)
- Coordinates: 24°52′48″N 93°47′47″E
- Country: India
- State: Manipur
- District: Kangpokpi
- Subdivision: Kangchup Geljang
- Elevation: 1,000–1,100 m (3,300–3,600 ft)

Population (2011)
  - Total: 1,038

Language(s)
  - Official: Meitei (Manipuri)
  - Spoken: Liangmai
- Time zone: UTC+5:30 (IST)

The Ireng Naga village, also known as Puilong, is a tribal village in the Kangpokpi district of Manipur, India, on the eastern slopes of the Koubru hills range. It lies to the southwest of Singa Dam reservoir at elevations between 1000–1100 m. The village is populated by Liangmai people, a tribe of Naga people.

== Name ==
The village was originally called "Ireng Kacha Naga", noting the ethnicity of its inhabitants as "Kacha Naga". Until recent years, "Kacha Naga" was a term used to cover Zeme and Liangmai tribals of Manipur, but it is now frowned upon. On the maps, the name of the village is marked as just "Ireng".

== Geography ==
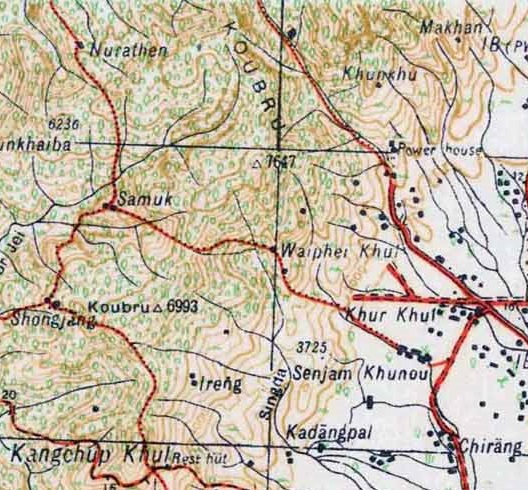
1944 Survey of India map showing the Ireng village to the west of Singda

The Singda stream and its tributaries rise below the peak 7647 and peak 6993 in the Koubru hills range, and converge at a bowl in the hill slope where the present day Singda Dam reservoir is formed. The 1944 survey maps shows the Ireng Naga village directly to the west of this location. The current location of the village is to the southwest of the Singda Dam reservoir. It is on a sloping ridge between at elevations 1000–1100 m, directly above the Kangchup cluster of villages.

A road runs up the ridge from Kangchup Geljang, passing through Ireng Naga, and follows a curve in the ridgeline towards north and heads towards the Kharam Vaiphei village, which lies to the northwest of the Singda Dam reservoir. Another road branches off southwards and heads to Kangchup Khul.

These two roads linking the Kangchup Khul and Kharam Vaiphei were eventually used by the Kuki-Zo people as part of the link road connecting Churachandpur and Kangpokpi during the Manipur ethnic conflict that erupted in 2023.

Ireng Naga apparently controls large hill tracts in the area. Older maps show several settlements distributed around these tracts, which have consolidated into a compact village at the present time.

== Demographics ==
As per the 2011 census, Ireng Naga has a population of 1038 people inhabiting 207 households. Of these, 525 are male and 513 are female. This gives Konsakhul a sex ratio of 977 which is slightly lower than Manipur state average of 985. The literacy rate of Konsakhul is 87.92%, better than the state average of 76.94%. Male literacy stands at 91.44 and female literacy at 84.36. Almost all the population of Konsakhul belong to Scheduled Tribes (Liangmai people).

== Recent developments ==
=== 2023–2026 Manipur conflict ===
During the Manipur ethnic conflict that erupted in 2023, which was primarily between the Meitei and Kuki-Zo tribals, the Liangmai Naga people also got involved on occasion, giving rise to a major hostage crisis in 2026.

Since the Kuki-Zo people were barred from entering the Imphal Valley due to the violence, they needed alternative road connectivity between Churachandpur and Kangpokpi, their two major population centres. The Kuki militant groups under Suspension of Operations (SoO) agreement reportedly addressed the issue by linking inter-village roads in Churacandpur and Kangpokpi districts and filling the gaps between them. The road came to be known informally as "German-Tiger Road" after the militant leaders who supervised its construction. In July 2025, the Naga villages along the road, organised under a Foothills Naga Coordination Committee (FNCC), raised complaints that the road had become a "drug corridor" and imposed a blockade. After talks with the government and threats of counter-blockade by Kuki-Zo people, the blockade was lifted on 7 August.

Trouble erupted again in January 2026. On 12 January, the Committee on Tribal Unity (CoTU), a Kuki-Zo umbrella body of the Kangpokpi district, alleged that there was a bomb attack on the Kharam Vaiphei village and subsequently the Kuki-Zo road link was blocked near Ireng Naga. The next day, the Liangmai Naga Council issued its own allegations claiming that the Kuki National Front cadres engaged in intimidation activities on the Ireng Naga village. The Kamson faction of Zeliangrong United Front, a Naga militant group under ceasefire agreement, also issued a rejoinder to the CoTU statement. The blockade at Ireng Naga continued. It is believed that the Kuki-Zo used an alternative route bypassing the lands of the village.

== Bibliography ==
- Senapati District Census Handbook (PDF), Directorate of Census Operations, Manipur, 2001
- Kuthar, Greeshma (1 September 2026). "Dying on These Hills: The senseless cycle of Naga–Kuki violence in Manipur". The Caravan.
