= Kangpokpi =

Kangpokpi Kanggui
- Town
- Location in Manipur, India Kangpokpi (India)
- Coordinates: 25°8′56″N 93°58′14″E
- Country: India
- State: Manipur
- District: Kangpokpi district
- Elevation: 1,220 m (4,000 ft)

Population (2011 census)
  - Total: 7,476

Language(s)
  - Official: Meitei (officially called Manipuri) (Note: Meitei language (officially known as Manipuri language) is the official language of Manipur. Other regional languages of different places in Manipur may either be predominantly spoken or not in their respective places but "Meitei" is always officially used.)
  - Regional: Thadou language
- Time zone: UTC+5:30 (IST)
- PIN: 795129
- Telephone code: 03880
- Vehicle registration: 03W
- Coastline: 0 kilometres (0 mi)
- Nearest city: Imphal
- Sex ratio: 989/1000 ♂/♀
- Literacy: 83%
- Lok Sabha constituency: Outer Manipur
- Website: kangpokpi.nic.in

Kangpokpi (Meitei pronunciation:/kāng-pōk-pī/ (Note: Meitei language (officially known as Manipuri language) is the official language of Manipur. Other regional languages of different places in Manipur may either be predominantly spoken or not in their respective places but "Meitei" is always officially used.)), is the headquarter of Kangpokpi district and the Sadar Hills Autonomous District Council in the Indian state of Manipur.

== Geography ==
It is located at an elevation of 1000 m above sea level.

== Religion ==
Religion in census town of Kangpokpi (2011 Census)
Religion	Percent
Christians	79.60%
Hindus	19.48%
Buddhist	0.39%
Muslims	0.20%
Others	0.19%
Jain	0.11%
Sikh	0.03%
Not Stated	0.01%

== Notable people ==
- Boithang Haokip the Indian footballer is a resident of Kangpokpi.
