= Sadar Hills =

North Eastern autonomous divisions

Sadar Hills is a geographic area in the state of Manipur in North East India.

== People ==
Sadar Hills is inhabited by heterogeneous ethnic groups with inherent socio-economic and cultural backgrounds, including the Kuki tribes like Thadou, Vaiphei, Gangte and minor of Nepalis and Nagas. Many of the people are economically underprivileged. As per the Hill House Counting and Grazing Tax assessment of 2012, the total number of villages and population of Sadar Hills in the three sub-divisional wise are shown below:

Sl/no.	Name of Sub-Division	No. of village	Population
1.	Kangpokpi-Sadar Hills West	150	60945
2.	Saitu-Gamphazol	259	44130
3.	Saikul-Sadar Hills East	178	51438
4.	Total :	587	156513

== Geography ==
Sadar Hills has mild climatic conditions. The land has a complete and clear demarcated boundary.

== Government ==
In 1971, during the process for granting full-fledged statehood to Manipur, the government of India passed an Act of Parliament, called Manipur (Hill Areas) Autonomous District Council Act, 1971 (vide Section 4 of Sub-Section 3, Bill No. 76 of 26/12/1971) for safeguarding the hill areas and protection of the tribals in Manipur. The Act provides for creation of six Autonomous District Councils in the hill areas of Manipur for ultimate conversion into full-fledged district, viz.:

1. Manipur North Autonomous District (Senapati)
2. Sadar Hills Autonomous District (Sadar Hills)
3. Manipur East Autonomous District (Ukhrul)
4. Tengnoupal Autonomous District (Chandel)
5. Manipur South Autonomous District (Churachandpur)
6. Manipur West Autonomous District (Tamenglong)

In spite of many protests by the Naga people of the area, as of 2016 Sadar Hills had been created as a district.

Sl/no.	Name Of Sub-Division	Area (in Sq.Km)	No. of village as 2011 Census	Population as of 2011 Census
1.	Kangpokpi-Sadar Hills West	476	150	60945
2.	Saitu-Gamphazol	457	295	44130
3.	Saikul-Sadar Hills East	765	178	51438
4.	Total	1698	623	1,56,513

== See also ==
- North Eastern Council
- Hill tribes of Northeast India
