= Kangpokpi district =

- District of Manipur
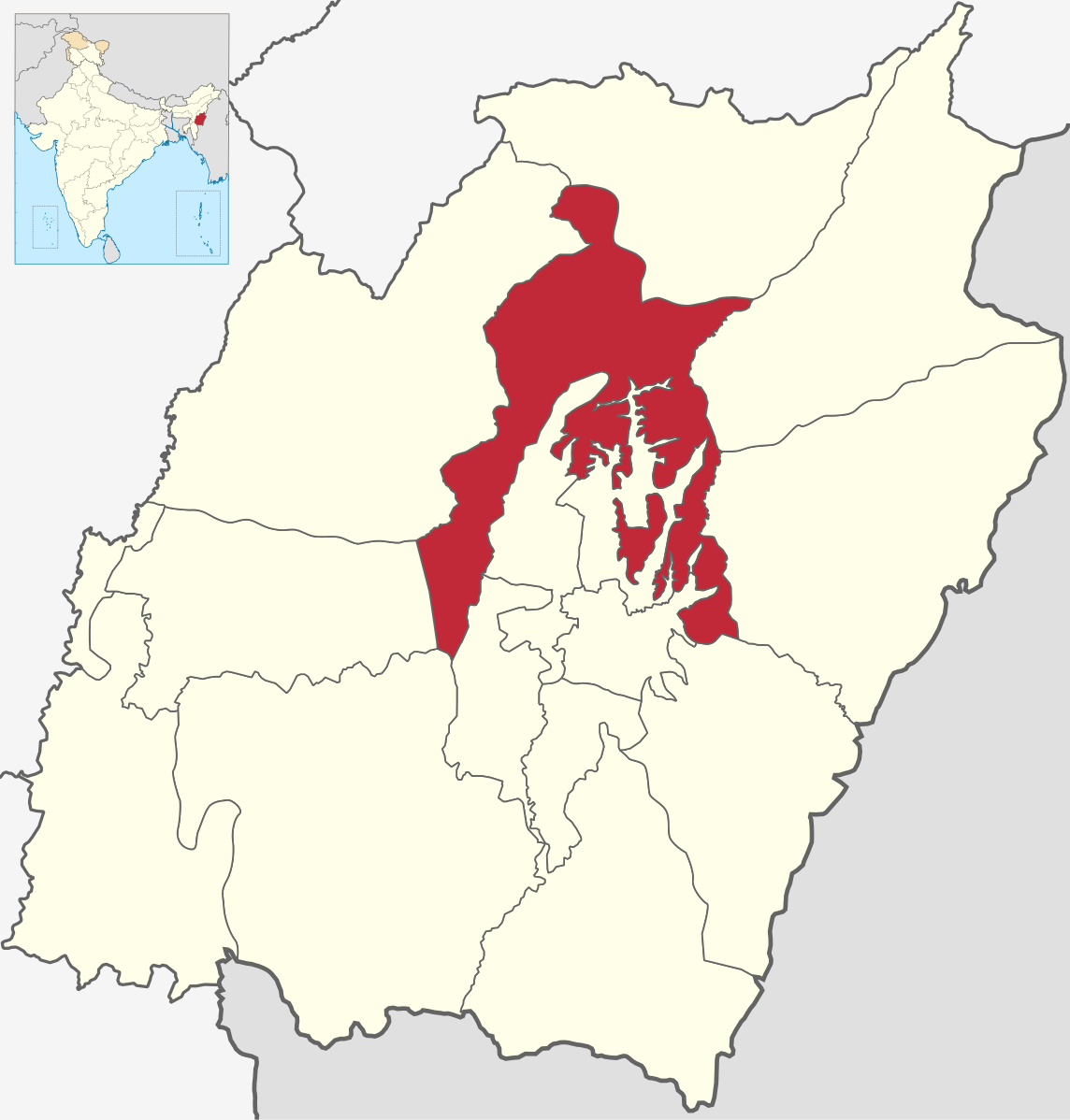
- Location in Manipur
- Interactive map of Kangpokpi district
- Coordinates (Kangpokpi): 25.15°N 93.97°E
- Country: India
- State: Manipur
- Headquarters: Kangpokpi

Government
  - Constituencies: Saikul, Kangpokpi and Saitu

Area
  - Total: 1,698 km^{2} (656 sq mi)
  - Rank: 7

Population (2011)
  - Total: 193,744
  - Density: 114.1/km^{2} (295.5/sq mi)
  - Urban: 13,000

Language(s)
  - Official: Meitei (officially called Manipuri)
  - Regional: Thadou, Nepali and other Chin-Kuki-Mizo languages
- Time zone: UTC+05:30 (IST)
- Website: https://kangpokpi.nic.in/

Kangpokpi district (Meitei pronunciation: /kāng-pōk-pī/) is one of the 16 districts in the Indian state of Manipur. It was created in December 2016 from areas in the Sadar Hills region which were previously part of Senapati District.

The district headquarters is located in Kangpokpi. The district was formed from three sub-divisions of Senapati District: Sadar Hills West, Sadar Hills East and Saitu–Gamphazol.

== History ==
2011 district map of Manipur; the Senapati district was divided into the present Senapati district and Kangpokpi district in 2016

After its merger into the Republic of India, the Manipur state was administered as a single district comprising a union territory. It was divided into eight subdivisions, of which the Sadar Subdivision (central subdivision) consisted of the region around the Imphal city, containing both a valley portion and hill regions. The hill regions of the Sadar Subdivision came to be called "Sadar Hills". By 1961, they were combined with the Mao Subdivision to the north form "Mao and Sadar Hills" (which came to be known as the "Senapati district" in more recent times). The valley portion of the Sadar Subdivision was also divided into two subdivisions called Imphal West and Imphal East, a division that persists till this day.

In 1969, the territory of Manipur was divided into five districts, with "Mao and Sadar Hills" becoming the district called "Manipur North". Its headquarters was at Karong. The district was divided into three subdivisions: Sadar Hills, Mao West and Mao East.

During the late 1950s and 1960s, the Kuki tribes living in the northern hills of Manipur faced large-scale displacement, as a result of the activism of the Naga National League and Manipur Naga Council attempting to homogenise the population in those areas. Between 1951 and 1961, 30 villages of the Ukhrul Subdivision, 77 villages of the Tamenglong Subdivision, and 14 villages of the Mao Subdivision were eliminated. The displaced Kuki tribes from these districts moved inwards into the state and some of them settled in the Sadar Hills. This gave the Sadar Hills subdivision a distinct character.

In 1976, the district headquarters of "Manipur North" was shifted to the town of Senapati, and the district itself came to be called the Senapati district. In 1981, Sadar Hills was divided into two subdivisions, Sadar Hills West, based at Kangpokpi and Sadar Hills East, based at Saikul. The remainder of the district was made one subdivision called Mao-Maram, and was based at Tadubi. Efforts made by the successive governments of Manipur to separate the Sadar Hills subdivisions into an independent district failed owing to pressure from the Naga tribals.

=== District demand movement ===
The Sadar Hills Kuki Chiefs' Zonal Council resolved in 1970 to demand a separate district for Sadar Hills, and submitted a memorandum to the Union Home Minister K. C. Pant. In 1971, shortly before Manipur became a full-fledged state, the Government of India enacted the Manipur (Hill Areas) District Council Act, 1971, granting autonomous district councils (ADCs) for the hill regions. Two separate ADCs, for Sadar Hills and Manipur North, were established in 1972. However, due to opposition from the Nagas, Sadar Hills was not made into a separate district, and continued as part of Manipur North.

Demands continued to be made by the Sadar Hills District Demand Committee (SHDDC) formed in 1974. In 1982, Richard Keishing's government took a cabinet decision to form the district, an ordinance was issued declaring it as district, but it was withdrawn in the face of opposition. Efforts were made again during the Ranbir Singh government in 1990–91, Dorendro Singh government and Nipamacha Singh government in 1997.

During the Kuki–Naga clashes of the 1990s, further displacement of Kukis occurred into the Sadar Hills region and perhaps also displacement of Nagas out of the region. Multiple protests and demonstrations were held by the local populace for the district demand, causing several deaths. In 2011, the Kuki community held a 92-day economic blockade of the state along the national highways NH-2 and NH-37. A Memorandum of Understanding was signed by the SHDDC and the state government agreeing on a plan of action. The next day, the United Naga Council (UNC) and the All-Naga Students Association of Manipur (ANSAM) imposed a 78-hour shutdown to protest the decision, after which the issue was again put into cold storage.

Finally, in 2016, the Okram Ibobi Singh government, in one of its last acts before the legislative assembly election, formed seven new districts by bifurcating existing districts, with Sadar Hills being one of them. It was named the Kangpokpi district with a headquarters at Kangpokpi. The United Naga Council conducted a five-month blockade in the Naga districts of Manipur to protest the creation of the new districts. As of 2024 the UNC continues its opposition to the new districts, calling their creation "arbitrary".

== Geography ==
Terrain map of the Manipur state. Visible are the Imphal River valley and Iril River valley to the north of Imphal, and the Thoubal River valley to the east. The "landlocked" Nongmaiching Hill range can also be seen.

The Kangpokpi district consists of the hilly region surrounding the northern part of the Imphal Valley on three sides, west, north and east. The region crosses several river valleys, the Imphal River valley in the northwest, which contains the Kangpokpi town, the Iril River valley in the north, which contains the Saikul town, the Yaingangpokpi valley in the northeast, and the Thoubal River valley in the east. The district border along all these valleys is contentious, and shows considerable variation over the decades. The border is subject to the distinction between "Valley Areas" and "Hill Areas" in Manipur and is frequently disputed. (Note: For example, an Imphal activist stated in October 2023: "Hangoipat in Imphal East district is one such area which they've recently renamed as H Twinomjang Village and further tried to assimilate the area into one of the hill districts".) In September 2023, the National Commission for Scheduled Tribes (NCST) wrote to the state government stating that the definition of "Hill Areas" was as per the First Schedule of the Manipur Legislative Assembly (Hill Areas Committee) Order, 1972, and that all boundary disputes had to be settled as per this definition.

In addition to the surrounding hills, the Nongmaiching Hill range, which is within the geographical precincts of the Imphal East district, was transferred to the Saikul subdivision of the Senapati district between 1991 and 2001. This is confirmed by the District Census Handbook, which states that it is "administratively under the Senapati district". However, news reports continue to describe it as being in the Imphal East district. Most of the area of the hill range is a reserved forest.

To the west of the Imphal Valley, Mount Koubru, considered historically sacred by the Meitei community, lies in the Saitu-Gamphazol subdivision of the Kangpokpi district. A portion of the eastern slope of the Koubru hills range has been designated as a reserved forest in 1968, called Kanglatombi–Kangpokpi Reserved Forest. It has been reported that four villages lie inside the reserved forest area, and 25 villages on the periphery.

== Demographics ==
Religions in Kangpokpi district (2011)
Religion	Percent
Christianity	79.90%
Hinduism	17.68%
Buddhism	0.92%
Islam	0.45%
Other or not stated	1.05%

Languages in Kangpokpi district (2011)
1. Thadou Kuki (52.9%)
2. Nepali (16.0%)
3. Vaiphei (5.08%)
4. Tangkhul (4.02%)
5. Lianglad (3.56%)
6. Chirr (2.64%)
7. Kom (2.35%)
8. Kabui (2.11%)
9. Maring (1.42%)
10. Mao (1.13%)
11. Hindi (1.03%)
12. Others (6.85%)

At the time of the 2011 census, Kangpokpi district had a population of 193,744. Kangpokpi district had a sex ratio of 959 females per 1000 males and had a literacy rate of 85% - 89% for males and 80.34% for females. 3.86% of the population lived in urban areas. Scheduled Castes and Scheduled Tribes made up 0.37% and 79.76% of the population respectively.

=== Religion ===
Christianity is the dominant religion in the district. Almost all tribals are Christian. The non-tribals, mainly Gorkhas (Nepali) are primarily Hindus, with there being some Buddhist Gorkhas.

=== Languages ===
At the time of the 2011 census, Languages percentages are 52.85% of the population spoke Thadou, 15.96% Nepali, 5.08% Vaiphei, 5.02% Tangkhul, 3.56% Lianglad, 2.64% Chirr, 2.35% Kom, 2.11% Ruanglat, 1.42% Maring, 1.13% Mao and 1.03% Hindi as their first language.

== See also ==
- List of populated places in Kangpokpi district

== Bibliography ==
- Manipur Administrative Atlas (PDF), Census of India, Government of India, 2005
- Imphal East District Census Handbook (PDF), Directorate of Census Operations, Manipur, 2011
- Haokip, Thongkholal (Winter 2012), "District status for Sadar Hills in Manipur", Man and Society, IX: 92–112 – via ssrn
- Haokip, Thongkholal (2023), "Home and Belonging in Northeast India", in Amit Ranjan; Diotima Chattoraj (eds.), Migration, Regional Autonomy, and Conflicts in Eastern South Asia: Searching for a Home(land), Springer Nature, ISBN 9783031287640 – via ssrn.com
