= Nkio =

Nkio may refer to:

- Old Nkio, a village in Tening Circle, Nagaland, India
- New Nkio, a village in Kebai Khelma Circle, Nagaland, India
- Nkio B, a village in Kebai Khelma Circle, Nagaland, India
