= Peren, Nagaland =

Peren
- Town
- Location in Nagaland, India
- Coordinates: 25.554°N 93.7406°E
- Country: India
- State: Nagaland
- District: Peren District
- Elevation: 1,445 m (4,741 ft)

Population (2011)
  - Total: 9,744
  - Density: 38/km^{2} (98/sq mi)

Languages
  - Official: English
  - Major languages: Zeme • Rongmei • Lianglad
- Time zone: UTC+5:30 (IST)
- Vehicle registration: NL
- Nearest city: Chümoukedima
- Climate: Cold (Köppen)
- Website: peren-district.nic.in

Peren (/ˈpɛrən/) is a small town in the Indian state of Nagaland. It is the district headquarters of the Peren District. The Zeliangrong Nagas are the main inhabitants of Peren. Majority of the people from Peren speak Zeme with a good number of Rongmei and Lianglad speakers.
