= Upper Sinjol =

- Village
- Location in Nagaland, India Upper Sinjol (India)
- Coordinates: 25.401672°N 93.577276°E
- Country: India
- State: Nagaland
- District: Peren
- Circle: Tening

Population (2011)
  - Total: 410
- Time zone: UTC+5:30 (IST)
- Postal code: 797101
- Census code: 268376

Upper Sinjol is a village in the Peren district of Nagaland, India. It is located in the Tening Circle.

== Demographics ==
Presently Upper sinjol has a household of 50 and population around 300 plus
