= New Beisumpui =

- Village
- Location in Nagaland, India New Beisumpui (India)
- Coordinates: 25.493150°N 93.538610°E
- Country: India
- State: Nagaland
- District: Peren
- Circle: Athibung

Population (2011)
  - Total: 559
- Time zone: UTC+5:30 (IST)
- Census code: 268344

New Beisumpui is a village in the Peren district of Nagaland, India. It is located in the Athibung Circle.

== Demographics ==
According to the 2011 census of India, New Beisumpui has 105 households. The effective literacy rate (i.e. the literacy rate of population excluding children aged 6 and below) is 75.32%.

Demographics (2011 Census)
	Total	Male	Female
Population	559	292	267
Children aged below 6 years	166	74	92
Scheduled caste	0	0	0
Scheduled tribe	557	291	266
Literates	296	172	124
Workers (all)	322	175	147
Main workers (total)	171	146	25
Main workers: Cultivators	156	134	22
Main workers: Agricultural labourers	2	1	1
Main workers: Household industry workers	0	0	0
Main workers: Other	13	11	2
Marginal workers (total)	151	29	122
Marginal workers: Cultivators	136	22	114
Marginal workers: Agricultural labourers	0	0	0
Marginal workers: Household industry workers	0	0	0
Marginal workers: Others	15	7	8
Non-workers	237	117	120
