= Vongkithem =

- village
- Location in Nagaland, India Vongkithem (India)
- Coordinates: 25.554890°N 93.589064°E
- Country: India
- State: Nagaland
- District: Peren
- Circle: Athibung

Population (2011)
  - Total: 329
- Time zone: UTC+5:30 (IST)
- PIN: 797110
- Census code: 268334

Vongkithem is a village in the Peren district of Nagaland, India. It is located in the Athibung Circle.

== Demographics ==
According to the 2011 census of India, Vongkithem has 66 households. The effective literacy rate (i.e. the literacy rate of population excluding children aged 6 and below) is 84.43%.

Demographics (2011 Census)
	Total	Male	Female
Population	329	173	156
Children aged below 6 years	85	47	38
Scheduled caste	0	0	0
Scheduled tribe	329	173	156
Literates	206	107	99
Workers (all)	194	104	90
Main workers (total)	120	86	34
Main workers: Cultivators	107	74	33
Main workers: Agricultural labourers	1	1	0
Main workers: Household industry workers	0	0	0
Main workers: Other	12	11	1
Marginal workers (total)	74	18	56
Marginal workers: Cultivators	43	6	37
Marginal workers: Agricultural labourers	1	1	0
Marginal workers: Household industry workers	1	1	0
Marginal workers: Others	29	10	19
Non-workers	135	69	66
