= Lilen, Peren =

Lilen
- Village
- Location Nagaland, India Lilen (India)
- Coordinates: 25.598650°N 93.605179°E
- Country: India
- State: Nagaland
- District: Peren
- Circle: Athibung

Population (2011)
  - Total: 912
- Time zone: UTC+5:30 (IST)
- Census code: 268327

Lilen is a village in the Peren district of Nagaland, India. It is located in the Athibung Circle.

== Demographics ==
According to the 2011 census of India, Lilen has 168 households. The literacy rate of the village is 64.91%.

Demographics (2011 Census)
	Total	Male	Female
Population	912	465	447
Children aged below 6 years	185	93	92
Scheduled caste	0	0	0
Scheduled tribe	912	465	447
Literates	592	308	284
Workers (all)	622	323	299
Main workers (total)	303	194	109
Main workers: Cultivators	272	176	96
Main workers: Agricultural labourers	11	9	2
Main workers: Household industry workers	1	1	0
Main workers: Other	19	8	11
Marginal workers (total)	319	129	190
Marginal workers: Cultivators	263	106	157
Marginal workers: Agricultural labourers	24	11	13
Marginal workers: Household industry workers	7	2	5
Marginal workers: Others	25	10	15
Non-workers	290	142	148
