= Lilen B =

Lilen 'B' Lilen 'B' (UR)
- Village
- Location in Nagaland, India Lilen 'B' (India)
- Coordinates: 25.576064°N 93.707416°E
- Country: India
- State: Nagaland
- District: Peren
- Circle: Athibung

Population (2011)
  - Total: 96
- Time zone: UTC+5:30 (IST)
- Census code: 268328

Lilen 'B' is a village in the Peren district of Nagaland, India. It is located in the Athibung Circle.

== Demographics ==
According to the 2011 census of India, Lilen 'B' has 21 households. The effective literacy rate (i.e. the literacy rate of population excluding children aged 6 and below) is 80.6%.

Demographics (2011 Census)
	Total	Male	Female
Population	96	43	53
Children aged below 6 years	29	14	15
Scheduled caste	0	0	0
Scheduled tribe	96	43	53
Literates	54	22	32
Workers (all)	48	18	30
Main workers (total)	46	18	28
Main workers: Cultivators	46	18	28
Main workers: Agricultural labourers	0	0	0
Main workers: Household industry workers	0	0	0
Main workers: Other	0	0	0
Marginal workers (total)	2	0	2
Marginal workers: Cultivators	2	0	2
Marginal workers: Agricultural labourers	0	0	0
Marginal workers: Household industry workers	0	0	0
Marginal workers: Others	0	0	0
Non-workers	48	25	23
