= Nzauna =

- village
- Location in Nagaland, India Nzauna (India)
- Coordinates: 25.234032°N 93.568990°E
- Country: India
- State: Nagaland
- District: Peren
- Circle: Nsong

Population (2011)
  - Total: 989
- Time zone: UTC+5:30 (IST)
- Census code: 268371

Nzauna is a village in the Peren district of Nagaland, India. It is located in the Nsong Circle.

== Demographics ==
According to the 2011 census of India, Nzauna has 108 households. The effective literacy rate (i.e. the literacy rate of population excluding children aged 6 and below) is 77.23%.

Demographics (2011 Census)
| | Total | Male | Female |
|---|---|---|---|
| Population | 989 | 526 | 463 |
| Children aged below 6 years | 93 | 52 | 41 |
| Scheduled caste | 0 | 0 | 0 |
| Scheduled tribe | 987 | 526 | 461 |
| Literates | 692 | 388 | 304 |
| Workers (all) | 694 | 365 | 329 |
| Main workers (total) | 574 | 293 | 281 |
| Main workers: Cultivators | 557 | 282 | 275 |
| Main workers: Agricultural labourers | 0 | 0 | 0 |
| Main workers: Household industry workers | 2 | 2 | 0 |
| Main workers: Other | 15 | 9 | 6 |
| Marginal workers (total) | 120 | 72 | 48 |
| Marginal workers: Cultivators | 119 | 71 | 48 |
| Marginal workers: Agricultural labourers | 1 | 1 | 0 |
| Marginal workers: Household industry workers | 0 | 0 | 0 |
| Marginal workers: Others | 0 | 0 | 0 |
| Non-workers | 295 | 161 | 134 |
