= Nchan =

- village
- Location Nagaland, India Nchan (India)
- Coordinates: 25.280683°N 93.517065°E
- Country: India
- State: Nagaland
- District: Peren
- Circle: Nsong

Population (2011)
  - Total: 528
- Time zone: UTC+5:30 (IST)
- Census code: 268366

Nchan is a village in the Peren district of Nagaland, India. It is located in the Nsong Circle.

== Demographics ==
According to the 2011 census of India, Nchan has 80 households. The effective literacy rate (i.e. the literacy rate of population excluding children aged 6 and below) is 87.59%.

Demographics (2011 Census)
	Total	Male	Female
Population	528	301	227
Children aged below 6 years	109	67	42
Scheduled caste	0	0	0
Scheduled tribe	528	301	227
Literates	367	218	149
Workers (all)	327	176	151
Main workers (total)	232	121	111
Main workers: Cultivators	184	88	96
Main workers: Agricultural labourers	0	0	0
Main workers: Household industry workers	2	0	2
Main workers: Other	46	33	13
Marginal workers (total)	95	55	40
Marginal workers: Cultivators	87	51	36
Marginal workers: Agricultural labourers	0	0	0
Marginal workers: Household industry workers	1	0	1
Marginal workers: Others	7	4	3
Non-workers	201	125	76
