= Nsong Village =

Nsong Village Nsong Vill.
- village
- Location in Nagaland, India Nsong Village (India)
- Coordinates: 25.271238°N 93.547925°E
- Country: India
- State: Nagaland
- District: Peren
- Circle: Nsong

Population (2011)
  - Total: 638
- Time zone: UTC+5:30 (IST)
- Census code: 268368

Nsong Village is a village in the Peren district of Nagaland, India. It is located in the Nsong Circle.

== Demographics ==
According to the 2011 census of India, Nsong Village has 145 households. The effective literacy rate (i.e. the literacy rate of population excluding children aged 6 and below) is 75.35%.

Demographics (2011 Census)
	Total	Male	Female
Population	638	301	337
Children aged below 6 years	139	58	81
Scheduled caste	0	0	0
Scheduled tribe	638	301	337
Literates	376	199	177
Workers (all)	415	203	212
Main workers (total)	233	116	117
Main workers: Cultivators	201	96	105
Main workers: Agricultural labourers	6	3	3
Main workers: Household industry workers	2	2	0
Main workers: Other	24	15	9
Marginal workers (total)	182	87	95
Marginal workers: Cultivators	180	87	93
Marginal workers: Agricultural labourers	0	0	0
Marginal workers: Household industry workers	0	0	0
Marginal workers: Others	2	0	2
Non-workers	223	98	125
