= Heiranglwa =

- village
- Location in Nagaland, India Heiranglwa (India)
- Coordinates: 25.424817°N 93.610097°E
- Country: India
- State: Nagaland
- District: Peren
- Circle: Tening

Population (2011)
  - Total: 476
- Time zone: UTC+5:30 (IST)
- Census code: 268372

Heiranglwa is a village in the Peren district of Nagaland, India. It is located in the Tening Circle.

== Demographics ==
According to the 2011 census of India, Heiranglwa has 107 households. The effective literacy rate (i.e. the literacy rate of population excluding children aged 6 and below) is 68.51%.

Demographics (2011 Census)
	Total	Male	Female
Population	476	237	239
Children aged below 6 years	41	25	16
Scheduled caste	0	0	0
Scheduled tribe	476	237	239
Literates	298	151	147
Workers (all)	341	158	183
Main workers (total)	303	142	161
Main workers: Cultivators	297	140	157
Main workers: Agricultural labourers	2	0	2
Main workers: Household industry workers	0	0	0
Main workers: Other	4	2	2
Marginal workers (total)	38	16	22
Marginal workers: Cultivators	5	1	4
Marginal workers: Agricultural labourers	15	7	8
Marginal workers: Household industry workers	9	2	7
Marginal workers: Others	9	6	3
Non-workers	135	79	56
