= Newchamcha =

Newchamcha Newchamcha (UR)
- Village
- Location in Nagaland, India Newchamcha (India)
- Coordinates: 25.580345°N 93.563191°E
- Country: India
- State: Nagaland
- District: Peren
- Circle: Athibung

Population (2011)
  - Total: 115
- Time zone: UTC+5:30 (IST)
- Census code: 268331

Newchamcha is a village in the Peren district of Nagaland, India. It is located in the Athibung Circle.

== Demographics ==
According to the 2011 census of India, Newchamcha has 25 households. The effective literacy rate (i.e. the literacy rate of population excluding children aged 6 and below) is 94.68%.

Demographics (2011 Census)
	Total	Male	Female
Population	115	64	51
Children aged below 6 years	21	13	8
Scheduled caste	0	0	0
Scheduled tribe	115	64	51
Literates	89	49	40
Workers (all)	88	48	40
Main workers (total)	61	39	22
Main workers: Cultivators	61	39	22
Main workers: Agricultural labourers	0	0	0
Main workers: Household industry workers	0	0	0
Main workers: Other	0	0	0
Marginal workers (total)	27	9	18
Marginal workers: Cultivators	26	8	18
Marginal workers: Agricultural labourers	0	0	0
Marginal workers: Household industry workers	1	1	0
Marginal workers: Others	0	0	0
Non-workers	27	16	11
