= Nkialwa =

- village
- Location Nagaland, India Nkialwa (India)
- Coordinates: 25.389050°N 93.635199°E
- Country: India
- State: Nagaland
- District: Peren
- Circle: Tening

Population (2011)
  - Total: 1,680
- Time zone: UTC+5:30 (IST)
- Census code: 268377

Nkialwa is a village in the Peren district of Nagaland, India. It is located in the Tening Circle.

== Demographics ==
According to the 2011 census of India, Nkialwa has 338 households. The effective literacy rate (i.e. the literacy rate of population excluding children aged 6 and below) is 55.93%.

Demographics (2011 Census)
	Total	Male	Female
Population	1680	909	771
Children aged below 6 years	239	126	113
Scheduled caste	0	0	0
Scheduled tribe	1590	862	728
Literates	806	466	340
Workers (all)	1299	705	594
Main workers (total)	996	538	458
Main workers: Cultivators	962	515	447
Main workers: Agricultural labourers	0	0	0
Main workers: Household industry workers	0	0	0
Main workers: Other	34	23	11
Marginal workers (total)	303	167	136
Marginal workers: Cultivators	299	166	133
Marginal workers: Agricultural labourers	0	0	0
Marginal workers: Household industry workers	0	0	0
Marginal workers: Others	4	1	3
Non-workers	381	204	177
