= Songsang, Nagaland =

Songsang
- village
- Location Nagaland, India Songsang (India)
- Coordinates: 25.485056°N 93.586867°E
- Country: India
- State: Nagaland
- District: Peren
- Circle: Athibung

Population (2011)
  - Total: 58
- Time zone: UTC+5:30 (IST)
- PIN: 797101
- Census code: 268349

Songsang is a village in the Peren district of Nagaland, India. It is located in the Athibung Circle.

== Demographics ==
According to the 2011 census of India, Songsang has 13 households. The effective literacy rate (i.e. the literacy rate of population excluding children aged 6 and below) is 97.78%.

Demographics (2011 Census)
	Total	Male	Female
Population	58	26	32
Children aged below 6 years	13	5	8
Scheduled caste	0	0	0
Scheduled tribe	58	26	32
Literates	44	20	24
Workers (all)	35	17	18
Main workers (total)	28	15	13
Main workers: Cultivators	23	13	10
Main workers: Agricultural labourers	2	1	1
Main workers: Household industry workers	0	0	0
Main workers: Other	3	1	2
Marginal workers (total)	7	2	5
Marginal workers: Cultivators	5	1	4
Marginal workers: Agricultural labourers	0	0	0
Marginal workers: Household industry workers	1	0	1
Marginal workers: Others	1	1	0
Non-workers	23	9	14
