= Mbaulwa =

- village
- Location in Nagaland, India Mbaulwa (India)
- Coordinates: 25.409922°N 93.638863°E
- Country: India
- State: Nagaland
- District: Peren
- Circle: Tening

Population (2011)
  - Total: 1,236
- Time zone: UTC+5:30 (IST)
- Census code: 268375

Mbaulwa is a village in the Peren district of Nagaland, India. It is located in the Tening Circle.

== Demographics ==
According to the 2011 census of India, Mbaulwa has 192 households. The effective literacy rate (i.e. the literacy rate of population excluding children aged 6 and below) is 94.14%.

Demographics (2011 Census)
	Total	Male	Female
Population	1236	642	594
Children aged below 6 years	59	34	25
Scheduled caste	0	0	0
Scheduled tribe	1235	641	594
Literates	1108	583	525
Workers (all)	1117	568	549
Main workers (total)	654	341	313
Main workers: Cultivators	614	311	303
Main workers: Agricultural labourers	0	0	0
Main workers: Household industry workers	0	0	0
Main workers: Other	40	30	10
Marginal workers (total)	463	227	236
Marginal workers: Cultivators	219	117	102
Marginal workers: Agricultural labourers	1	1	0
Marginal workers: Household industry workers	0	0	0
Marginal workers: Others	243	109	134
Non-workers	119	74	45
