= Ngam =

- village
- Location Nagaland, India Ngam (India)
- Coordinates: 25.247235°N 93.509110°E
- Country: India
- State: Nagaland
- District: Peren
- Circle: Nsong

Population (2011)
  - Total: 395
- Time zone: UTC+5:30 (IST)
- Census code: 268369

Ngam is a village in the Peren district of Nagaland, India. It is located in the Nsong Circle.

== Demographics ==
According to the 2011 census of India, Ngam has 93 households. The effective literacy rate (i.e. the literacy rate of the population excluding children aged 6 and below) is 61.35%.

Demographics (2011 Census)
| | Total | Male | Female |
|---|---|---|---|
| Population | 395 | 192 | 203 |
| Children aged below 6 years | 113 | 60 | 53 |
| Scheduled caste | 0 | 0 | 0 |
| Scheduled tribe | 395 | 192 | 203 |
| Literates | 173 | 86 | 87 |
| Workers (all) | 239 | 111 | 128 |
| Main workers (total) | 188 | 90 | 98 |
| Main workers: Cultivators | 181 | 85 | 96 |
| Main workers: Agricultural labourers | 0 | 0 | 0 |
| Main workers: Household industry workers | 0 | 0 | 0 |
| Main workers: Other | 7 | 5 | 2 |
| Marginal workers (total) | 51 | 21 | 30 |
| Marginal workers: Cultivators | 51 | 21 | 30 |
| Marginal workers: Agricultural labourers | 0 | 0 | 0 |
| Marginal workers: Household industry workers | 0 | 0 | 0 |
| Marginal workers: Others | 0 | 0 | 0 |
| Non-workers | 156 | 81 | 75 |
