= Gopibung =

Gopibung Gopibung (UR)
- Village
- Location in Nagaland, India Gopibung (India)
- Coordinates: 25.554003°N 93.503269°E
- Country: India
- State: Nagaland
- District: Peren
- Circle: Ahthibung

Population (2011)
  - Total: 49
- Time zone: UTC+5:30 (IST)
- Census code: 268348

Gopibung is a village in the Peren district of Nagaland, India. It is located in the Ahthibung Circle.

== Demographics ==
According to the 2011 census of India, Gopibung (UR) has 14 households. The effective literacy rate (i.e. the literacy rate of population excluding children aged 6 and below) is 71.05%.

Demographics (2011 Census)
	Total	Male	Female
Population	49	24	25
Children aged below 6 years	11	3	8
Scheduled caste	0	0	0
Scheduled tribe	49	24	25
Literates	27	19	8
Workers (all)	36	20	16
Main workers (total)	25	18	7
Main workers: Cultivators	24	17	7
Main workers: Agricultural labourers	0	0	0
Main workers: Household industry workers	0	0	0
Main workers: Other	1	1	0
Marginal workers (total)	11	2	9
Marginal workers: Cultivators	11	2	9
Marginal workers: Agricultural labourers	0	0	0
Marginal workers: Household industry workers	0	0	0
Marginal workers: Others	0	0	0
Non-workers	13	4	9
