= Old Beisumpui =

- village
- Location Nagaland, India Old Beisumpui (India)
- Coordinates: 25.474147°N 93.565231°E
- Country: India
- State: Nagaland
- District: Peren
- Circle: Athibung

Population (2011)
  - Total: 315
- Time zone: UTC+5:30 (IST)
- Census code: 268350

Old Beisumpui is a village in the Peren district of Nagaland, India. It is located in the Athibung Circle.

== Demographics ==
According to the 2011 census of India, Old Beisumpui has 61 households. The effective literacy rate (i.e. the literacy rate of population excluding children aged 6 and below) is 66.26%.

Demographics (2011 Census)
	Total	Male	Female
Population	315	156	159
Children aged below 6 years	72	35	37
Scheduled caste	0	0	0
Scheduled tribe	315	156	159
Literates	161	88	73
Workers (all)	197	94	103
Main workers (total)	130	64	66
Main workers: Cultivators	122	58	64
Main workers: Agricultural labourers	0	0	0
Main workers: Household industry workers	0	0	0
Main workers: Other	8	6	2
Marginal workers (total)	67	30	37
Marginal workers: Cultivators	66	30	36
Marginal workers: Agricultural labourers	0	0	0
Marginal workers: Household industry workers	0	0	0
Marginal workers: Others	1	0	1
Non-workers	118	62	56
