= Tesen =

Tesen may refer to:

- New Tesen, Nagaland, India, a village
- Old Tesen, Nagaland, India, a village
