= Bamsiakelu =

- village
- Location Nagaland, India Bamsiakelu (India)
- Coordinates: 25.296847°N 93.529329°E
- Country: India
- State: Nagaland
- District: Peren
- Circle: Nsong

Population (2011)
  - Total: 208
- Time zone: UTC+5:30 (IST)
- Census code: 268364

Bamsiakelu is a village in the Peren district of Nagaland, India. It is located in the Nsong Circle.

== Demographics ==
According to the 2011 census of India, Bamsiakelu has 37 households. The effective literacy rate (i.e. the literacy rate of population excluding children aged 6 and below) is 79.53%.

Demographics (2011 Census)
	Total	Male	Female
Population	208	109	99
Children aged below 6 years	37	18	19
Scheduled caste	0	0	0
Scheduled tribe	207	108	99
Literates	136	81	55
Workers (all)	152	83	69
Main workers (total)	89	50	39
Main workers: Cultivators	76	42	34
Main workers: Agricultural labourers	0	0	0
Main workers: Household industry workers	0	0	0
Main workers: Other	13	8	5
Marginal workers (total)	63	33	30
Marginal workers: Cultivators	62	32	30
Marginal workers: Agricultural labourers	0	0	0
Marginal workers: Household industry workers	0	0	0
Marginal workers: Others	1	1	0
Non-workers	56	26	30
