= Tening Christ Village =

Tening Christ Village Tening Christ Vill. (UR)
- village
- Location in Nagaland, India Tening Christ Village (India)
- Coordinates: 25.313193°N 93.599237°E
- Country: India
- State: Nagaland
- District: Peren
- Circle: Tening

Population (2011)
  - Total: 2,687
- Time zone: UTC+5:30 (IST)
- Census code: 268384

Tening Christ Village is a village in the Peren district of Nagaland, India. It is located in the Tening Circle.

== Demographics ==
According to the 2011 census of India, Tening Christ Vill. (UR) has 400 households. The effective literacy rate (i.e. the literacy rate of population excluding children aged 6 and below) is 82.59%.

Demographics (2011 Census)
	Total	Male	Female
Population	2687	1320	1367
Children aged below 6 years	246	105	141
Scheduled caste	0	0	0
Scheduled tribe	2674	1314	1360
Literates	2016	1038	978
Workers (all)	1164	571	593
Main workers (total)	916	460	456
Main workers: Cultivators	757	345	412
Main workers: Agricultural labourers	25	25	0
Main workers: Household industry workers	0	0	0
Main workers: Other	134	90	44
Marginal workers (total)	248	111	137
Marginal workers: Cultivators	88	28	60
Marginal workers: Agricultural labourers	1	1	0
Marginal workers: Household industry workers	7	3	4
Marginal workers: Others	152	79	73
Non-workers	1523	749	774
