= Pellhang =

- village
- Location Nagaland, India Pellhang (India)
- Coordinates: 25.523673°N 93.582007°E
- Country: India
- State: Nagaland
- District: Peren
- Circle: Athibung

Population (2011)
  - Total: 658
- Time zone: UTC+5:30 (IST)
- Census code: 268339

Pellhang is a village in the Peren district of Nagaland, India. It is located in Athibung, a sub-district.

== Demographics ==
According to the 2011 census of India, Pellhang had 142 households. The effective literacy rate (i.e. the literacy rate of population excluding children aged 6 and below) is 89.02%.

Demographics (2011 Census)
	Total	Male	Female
Population	658	348	310
Children aged below 6 years	148	81	67
Scheduled caste	0	0	0
Scheduled tribe	648	345	303
Literates	454	238	216
Workers (all)	347	182	165
Main workers (total)	309	174	135
Main workers: Cultivators	295	166	129
Main workers: Agricultural labourers	1	0	1
Main workers: Household industry workers	0	0	0
Main workers: Other	13	8	5
Marginal workers (total)	38	8	30
Marginal workers: Cultivators	16	1	15
Marginal workers: Agricultural labourers	0	0	0
Marginal workers: Household industry workers	0	0	0
Marginal workers: Others	22	7	15
Non-workers	311	166	145
