= Nchangram =

- village
- Location in Nagaland, India Nchangram (India)
- Coordinates: 25.353181°N 93.625287°E
- Country: India
- State: Nagaland
- District: Peren
- Circle: Tening

Population (2011)
  - Total: 2,673
- Time zone: UTC+5:30 (IST)
- Census code: 268381

Nchangram is a village in the Peren district of Nagaland, India. It is located in the Tening Circle.

== Demographics ==
According to the 2011 census of India, Nchangram has 498 households. The effective literacy rate (i.e. the literacy rate of population excluding children aged 6 and below) is 83.75%.

Demographics (2011 Census)
	Total	Male	Female
Population	2673	1411	1262
Children aged below 6 years	372	225	147
Scheduled caste	0	0	0
Scheduled tribe	2666	1405	1261
Literates	1927	1027	900
Workers (all)	2000	1038	962
Main workers (total)	1033	528	505
Main workers: Cultivators	820	404	416
Main workers: Agricultural labourers	9	7	2
Main workers: Household industry workers	5	4	1
Main workers: Other	199	113	86
Marginal workers (total)	967	510	457
Marginal workers: Cultivators	852	451	401
Marginal workers: Agricultural labourers	12	9	3
Marginal workers: Household industry workers	3	2	1
Marginal workers: Others	100	48	52
Non-workers	673	373	300
