= Old Nzau =

Old Nzau Nzau (Old)
- village
- Location in Nagaland, India Old Nzau (India)
- Coordinates: 25.267742°N 93.627179°E
- Country: India
- State: Nagaland
- District: Peren
- Circle: Tening

Population (2011)
  - Total: 1,430
- Time zone: UTC+5:30 (IST)
- Census code: 268388

Old Nzau is a village in the Peren district of Nagaland, India. It is located in the Tening Circle.

== Demographics ==
According to the 2011 census of India, Old Nzau has 270 households. The effective literacy rate (i.e. the literacy rate of population excluding children aged 6 and below) is 56.32%.

Demographics (2011 Census)
	Total	Male	Female
Population	1430	730	700
Children aged below 6 years	306	161	145
Scheduled caste	0	0	0
Scheduled tribe	1425	727	698
Literates	633	393	240
Workers (all)	698	329	369
Main workers (total)	339	255	84
Main workers: Cultivators	283	213	70
Main workers: Agricultural labourers	0	0	0
Main workers: Household industry workers	0	0	0
Main workers: Other	56	42	14
Marginal workers (total)	359	74	285
Marginal workers: Cultivators	261	19	242
Marginal workers: Agricultural labourers	0	0	0
Marginal workers: Household industry workers	0	0	0
Marginal workers: Others	98	55	43
Non-workers	732	401	331
