= Songlhuh =

- village
- Location in Nagaland, India Songlhuh (India)
- Coordinates: 25.497629°N 93.587534°E
- Country: India
- State: Nagaland
- District: Peren
- Circle: Athibung

Population (2011)
  - Total: 512
- Time zone: UTC+5:30 (IST)
- Census code: 268342

Songlhuh is a village in the Peren district of Nagaland, India. It is located in the Ahthibung Sub-division.

== Demographics ==
According to the 2011 census of India, Songlhuh has 112 households. The effective literacy rate (i.e. the literacy rate of population excluding children aged 6 and below) is 96.13%.

Demographics (2011 Census)
	Total	Male	Female
Population	512	261	251
Children aged below 6 years	99	45	54
Scheduled caste	0	0	0
Scheduled tribe	508	260	248
Literates	397	212	185
Workers (all)	313	193	120
Main workers (total)	161	114	47
Main workers: Cultivators	152	110	42
Main workers: Agricultural labourers	1	1	0
Main workers: Household industry workers	0	0	0
Main workers: Other	8	3	5
Marginal workers (total)	152	79	73
Marginal workers: Cultivators	102	50	52
Marginal workers: Agricultural labourers	0	0	0
Marginal workers: Household industry workers	1	1	0
Marginal workers: Others	49	28	21
Non-workers	199	68	131
