= New Chalkot =

- Village
- Location in Nagaland, India New Chalkot (India)
- Coordinates: 25.566380°N 93.619340°E
- Country: India
- State: Nagaland
- District: Peren
- Circle: Athibung

Population (2011)
  - Total: 402
- Time zone: UTC+5:30 (IST)
- Census code: 268333

New Chalkot is a village in the Peren district of Nagaland, India. It is located in the Athibung Circle.

== Demographics ==
According to the 2011 census of India, New Chalkot has 82 households. The effective literacy rate (i.e. the literacy rate of population excluding children aged 6 and below) is 90.34%.

Demographics (2011 Census)
	Total	Male	Female
Population	402	201	201
Children aged below 6 years	81	45	36
Scheduled caste	0	0	0
Scheduled tribe	400	200	200
Literates	290	147	143
Workers (all)	294	141	153
Main workers (total)	222	109	113
Main workers: Cultivators	207	99	108
Main workers: Agricultural labourers	3	1	2
Main workers: Household industry workers	0	0	0
Main workers: Other	12	9	3
Marginal workers (total)	72	32	40
Marginal workers: Cultivators	70	32	38
Marginal workers: Agricultural labourers	0	0	0
Marginal workers: Household industry workers	0	0	0
Marginal workers: Others	2	0	2
Non-workers	108	60	48
