= Old Chalkot =

- village
- Location Nagaland, India Old Chalkot (India)
- Coordinates: 25.503066°N 93.620957°E
- Country: India
- State: Nagaland
- District: Peren
- Circle: Athibung

Population (2011)
  - Total: 499
- Time zone: UTC+5:30 (IST)
- Census code: 268341

Old Chalkot is a village in the Peren district of Nagaland, India. It is located in the Athibung Circle.

== Demographics ==
According to the 2011 census of India, Old Chalkot has 84 households. The effective literacy rate (i.e. the literacy rate of population excluding children aged 6 and below) is 93.94%.

Demographics (2011 Census)
| | Total | Male | Female |
|---|---|---|---|
| Population | 499 | 247 | 252 |
| Children aged below 6 years | 103 | 58 | 45 |
| Scheduled caste | 0 | 0 | 0 |
| Scheduled tribe | 499 | 247 | 252 |
| Literates | 372 | 180 | 192 |
| Workers (all) | 368 | 180 | 188 |
| Main workers (total) | 158 | 93 | 65 |
| Main workers: Cultivators | 139 | 85 | 54 |
| Main workers: Agricultural labourers | 6 | 1 | 5 |
| Main workers: Household industry workers | 0 | 0 | 0 |
| Main workers: Other | 13 | 7 | 6 |
| Marginal workers (total) | 210 | 87 | 123 |
| Marginal workers: Cultivators | 99 | 32 | 67 |
| Marginal workers: Agricultural labourers | 7 | 4 | 3 |
| Marginal workers: Household industry workers | 7 | 3 | 4 |
| Marginal workers: Others | 97 | 48 | 49 |
| Non-workers | 131 | 67 | 64 |
