= Tening Namsan =

Tening Namsan Tening Namsan (UR)
- village
- Location in Nagaland, India Tening Namsan (India)
- Coordinates: 25.347°N 93.658°E
- Country: India
- State: Nagaland
- District: Peren
- Circle: Tening

Population (2011)
  - Total: 329
- Time zone: UTC+5:30 (IST)
- Census code: 268386

Tening Namsan is a village in the Peren district of Nagaland, India. It is located in the Tening Circle.

== Demographics ==
According to the 2011 census of India, Tening Namsan has 68 households. The effective literacy rate (i.e. the literacy rate of population excluding children aged 6 and below) is 52.9%.

Demographics (2011 Census)
	Total	Male	Female
Population	329	177	152
Children aged below 6 years	70	42	28
Scheduled caste	0	0	0
Scheduled tribe	328	177	151
Literates	137	91	46
Workers (all)	195	93	102
Main workers (total)	156	70	86
Main workers: Cultivators	148	64	84
Main workers: Agricultural labourers	1	1	0
Main workers: Household industry workers	0	0	0
Main workers: Other	7	5	2
Marginal workers (total)	39	23	16
Marginal workers: Cultivators	2	0	2
Marginal workers: Agricultural labourers	4	4	0
Marginal workers: Household industry workers	1	1	0
Marginal workers: Others	32	18	14
Non-workers	134	84	50
