= Bongkolong =

- Village
- Location in Nagaland, India Bongkolong (India)
- Coordinates: 25.490326°N 93.525729°E
- Country: India
- State: Nagaland
- District: Peren
- Circle: Athibung

Population (2011)
  - Total: 746
- Time zone: UTC+5:30 (IST)
- Census code: 268345

Bongkolong is a village in the Peren district of Nagaland, India. It is located in the Athibung Circle.

== Demographics ==
According to the 2011 census of India, Bongkolong has 162 households. The effective literacy rate (i.e. the literacy rate of population excluding children aged 6 and below) is 94.91%.

Demographics (2011 Census)
	Total	Male	Female
Population	746	403	343
Children aged below 6 years	157	82	75
Scheduled caste	0	0	0
Scheduled tribe	742	400	342
Literates	559	303	256
Workers (all)	491	270	221
Main workers (total)	328	198	130
Main workers: Cultivators	263	162	101
Main workers: Agricultural labourers	25	13	12
Main workers: Household industry workers	1	0	1
Main workers: Other	39	23	16
Marginal workers (total)	163	72	91
Marginal workers: Cultivators	71	30	41
Marginal workers: Agricultural labourers	75	36	39
Marginal workers: Household industry workers	1	1	0
Marginal workers: Others	16	5	11
Non-workers	255	133	122
