= Old Tening =

Old Tening Tening (Old)
- village
- Location in Nagaland, India Old Tening (India)
- Coordinates: 25.312056°N 93.609223°E
- Country: India
- State: Nagaland
- District: Peren
- Circle: Tening

Population (2011)
  - Total: 622
- Time zone: UTC+5:30 (IST)
- Census code: 268385

Old Tening is a village in the Peren district of Nagaland, India. It is located in the Tening Circle.

== Demographics ==
According to the 2011 census of India, Old Tening has 103 households. The effective literacy rate (i.e. the literacy rate of population excluding children aged 6 and below) is 69.2%.

Demographics (2011 Census)
	Total	Male	Female
Population	622	312	310
Children aged below 6 years	57	27	30
Scheduled caste	0	0	0
Scheduled tribe	611	305	306
Literates	391	213	178
Workers (all)	364	175	189
Main workers (total)	273	131	142
Main workers: Cultivators	218	99	119
Main workers: Agricultural labourers	0	0	0
Main workers: Household industry workers	1	1	0
Main workers: Other	54	31	23
Marginal workers (total)	91	44	47
Marginal workers: Cultivators	6	3	3
Marginal workers: Agricultural labourers	1	1	0
Marginal workers: Household industry workers	5	2	3
Marginal workers: Others	79	38	41
Non-workers	258	137	121
