= Azailong =

- village
- Location Nagaland, India Azailong (India)
- Coordinates: 25.379513°N 93.637085°E
- Country: India
- State: Nagaland
- District: Peren
- Circle: Tening

Population (2011)
  - Total: 1,147
- Time zone: UTC+5:30 (IST)
- Census code: 268378

Azailong is a village in the Peren district of Nagaland, India. It is located in the Tening Circle.

== Demographics ==
According to the 2011 census of India, Azailong has 241 households. The effective literacy rate (i.e. the literacy rate of population excluding children aged 6 and below) is 72.66%.

Demographics (2011 Census)
	Total	Male	Female
Population	1147	608	539
Children aged below 6 years	185	106	79
Scheduled caste	0	0	0
Scheduled tribe	1138	603	535
Literates	699	403	296
Workers (all)	734	386	348
Main workers (total)	490	267	223
Main workers: Cultivators	433	228	205
Main workers: Agricultural labourers	4	3	1
Main workers: Household industry workers	2	2	0
Main workers: Other	51	34	17
Marginal workers (total)	244	119	125
Marginal workers: Cultivators	229	110	119
Marginal workers: Agricultural labourers	7	5	2
Marginal workers: Household industry workers	0	0	0
Marginal workers: Others	8	4	4
Non-workers	413	222	191
