= Pellhang B =

Pellhang 'B' Pellhang 'B' (UR)
- village
- Location in Nagaland, India Pellhang 'B' (India)
- Coordinates: 25.547859°N 93.606118°E
- Country: India
- State: Nagaland
- District: Peren
- Circle: Athibung

Population (2011)
  - Total: 85
- Time zone: UTC+5:30 (IST)
- Census code: 268336

Pellhang 'B' is a village in the Peren district of Nagaland, India. It is located in the Athibung Circle.

== Demographics ==
According to the 2011 census of India, Pellhang 'B' has 23 households. The effective literacy rate (i.e. the literacy rate of population excluding children aged 6 and below) is 72.06%.

Demographics (2011 Census)
	Total	Male	Female
Population	85	46	39
Children aged below 6 years	17	9	8
Scheduled caste	0	0	0
Scheduled tribe	84	45	39
Literates	49	27	22
Workers (all)	49	28	21
Main workers (total)	40	22	18
Main workers: Cultivators	40	22	18
Main workers: Agricultural labourers	0	0	0
Main workers: Household industry workers	0	0	0
Main workers: Other	0	0	0
Marginal workers (total)	9	6	3
Marginal workers: Cultivators	8	6	2
Marginal workers: Agricultural labourers	0	0	0
Marginal workers: Household industry workers	0	0	0
Marginal workers: Others	1	0	1
Non-workers	36	18	18
