= Old Ngaulong =

- village
- Location Nagaland, India Old Ngaulong (India)
- Coordinates: 25.279394°N 93.478941°E
- Country: India
- State: Nagaland
- District: Peren
- Circle: Nsong

Population (2011)
  - Total: 487
- Time zone: UTC+5:30 (IST)
- Census code: 268367

Old Ngaulong is a village in the Peren district of Nagaland, India. It is located in the Nsong Circle.

== Demographics ==
According to the 2011 census of India, Old Ngaulong has 102 households. The effective literacy rate (i.e. the literacy rate of population excluding children aged 6 and below) is 70.68%.

Demographics (2011 Census)
	Total	Male	Female
Population	487	233	254
Children aged below 6 years	105	46	59
Scheduled caste	0	0	0
Scheduled tribe	486	233	253
Literates	270	143	127
Workers (all)	327	163	164
Main workers (total)	238	121	117
Main workers: Cultivators	234	118	116
Main workers: Agricultural labourers	0	0	0
Main workers: Household industry workers	0	0	0
Main workers: Other	4	3	1
Marginal workers (total)	89	42	47
Marginal workers: Cultivators	89	42	47
Marginal workers: Agricultural labourers	0	0	0
Marginal workers: Household industry workers	0	0	0
Marginal workers: Others	0	0	0
Non-workers	160	70	90
