= Phaijol =

- village
- Location in Nagaland, India Phaijol (India)
- Coordinates: 25.571796°N 93.559688°E
- Country: India
- State: Nagaland
- District: Peren
- Circle: Athibung

Population (2011)
  - Total: 471
- Time zone: UTC+5:30 (IST)
- Census code: 268332

Phaijol is a village in the Peren district of Nagaland, India. It is located in the Athibung Circle.

== Demographics ==
According to the 2011 census of India, Phaijol has 93 households. The effective literacy rate (i.e. the literacy rate of population excluding children aged 6 and below) is 76.22%.

Demographics (2011 Census)
| | Total | Male | Female |
|---|---|---|---|
| Population | 471 | 249 | 222 |
| Children aged below 6 years | 122 | 68 | 54 |
| Scheduled caste | 0 | 0 | 0 |
| Scheduled tribe | 469 | 248 | 221 |
| Literates | 266 | 154 | 112 |
| Workers (all) | 328 | 171 | 157 |
| Main workers (total) | 182 | 144 | 38 |
| Main workers: Cultivators | 175 | 138 | 37 |
| Main workers: Agricultural labourers | 0 | 0 | 0 |
| Main workers: Household industry workers | 0 | 0 | 0 |
| Main workers: Other | 7 | 6 | 1 |
| Marginal workers (total) | 146 | 27 | 119 |
| Marginal workers: Cultivators | 92 | 3 | 89 |
| Marginal workers: Agricultural labourers | 0 | 0 | 0 |
| Marginal workers: Household industry workers | 0 | 0 | 0 |
| Marginal workers: Others | 54 | 24 | 30 |
| Non-workers | 143 | 78 | 65 |
