= Nzau Namsan =

- village
- Location in Nagaland, India Nzau Namsan (India)
- Coordinates: 25.259432°N 93.613871°E
- Country: India
- State: Nagaland
- District: Peren
- Circle: Tening

Population (2011)
  - Total: 1,199
- Time zone: UTC+5:30 (IST)
- Census code: 268389

Nzau Namsan is a village in the Peren district of Nagaland, India. It is located in the Tening Circle.

== Demographics ==
According to the 2011 census of India, Nzau Namsan has 252 households. The effective literacy rate (i.e. the literacy rate of population excluding children aged 6 and below) is 43.15%.

Demographics (2011 Census)
	Total	Male	Female
Population	1199	635	564
Children aged below 6 years	207	112	95
Scheduled caste	0	0	0
Scheduled tribe	1198	635	563
Literates	428	266	162
Workers (all)	702	360	342
Main workers (total)	38	22	16
Main workers: Cultivators	10	5	5
Main workers: Agricultural labourers	5	3	2
Main workers: Household industry workers	1	1	0
Main workers: Other	22	13	9
Marginal workers (total)	664	338	326
Marginal workers: Cultivators	561	279	282
Marginal workers: Agricultural labourers	5	1	4
Marginal workers: Household industry workers	0	0	0
Marginal workers: Others	98	58	40
Non-workers	497	275	222
