= Tepun =

- village
- Location in Nagaland, India Tepun (India)
- Coordinates: 25.301265°N 93.646827°E
- Country: India
- State: Nagaland
- District: Peren
- Circle: Tening

Population (2011)
  - Total: 1,610
- Time zone: UTC+5:30 (IST)
- Census code: 268387

Tepun is a village in the Peren district of Nagaland, India. It is located in the Tening Circle.

== Demographics ==
According to the 2011 census of India, Tepun has 245 households. The effective literacy rate (i.e. the literacy rate of population excluding children aged 6 and below) is 30.79%.

Demographics (2011 Census)
	Total	Male	Female
Population	1610	880	730
Children aged below 6 years	168	100	68
Scheduled caste	0	0	0
Scheduled tribe	1594	872	722
Literates	444	271	173
Workers (all)	960	503	457
Main workers (total)	956	501	455
Main workers: Cultivators	947	495	452
Main workers: Agricultural labourers	2	1	1
Main workers: Household industry workers	2	1	1
Main workers: Other	5	4	1
Marginal workers (total)	4	2	2
Marginal workers: Cultivators	3	1	2
Marginal workers: Agricultural labourers	0	0	0
Marginal workers: Household industry workers	0	0	0
Marginal workers: Others	1	1	0
Non-workers	650	377	273
