= Mbaupunchi =

- village
- Location in Nagaland, India Mbaupunchi (India)
- Country: India
- State: Nagaland
- District: Peren
- Circle: Tening

Population (2011)
  - Total: 322
- Time zone: UTC+5:30 (IST)
- Census code: 268380

Mbaupunchi is a village in the Peren district of Nagaland, India. It is located in the Tening Circle.

== Demographics ==
According to the 2011 census of India, Mbaupunchi has 84 households. The effective literacy rate (i.e. the literacy rate of population excluding children aged 6 and below) is 73.97%.

Demographics (2011 Census)
	Total	Male	Female
Population	322	167	155
Children aged below 6 years	103	54	49
Scheduled caste	0	0	0
Scheduled tribe	322	167	155
Literates	162	93	69
Workers (all)	174	89	85
Main workers (total)	18	17	1
Main workers: Cultivators	17	17	0
Main workers: Agricultural labourers	0	0	0
Main workers: Household industry workers	0	0	0
Main workers: Other	1	0	1
Marginal workers (total)	156	72	84
Marginal workers: Cultivators	153	69	84
Marginal workers: Agricultural labourers	0	0	0
Marginal workers: Household industry workers	2	2	0
Marginal workers: Others	1	1	0
Non-workers	148	78	70
