= Phanjang =

- village
- Location in Nagaland, India Phanjang (India)
- Coordinates: 25.601127°N 93.621684°E
- Country: India
- State: Nagaland
- District: Peren
- Circle: Athibung

Population (2011)
  - Total: 314
- Time zone: UTC+5:30 (IST)
- Census code: 268329

Phanjang is a village in the Peren district of Nagaland, India. It is located in the Athibung Circle.

== Demographics ==
According to the 2011 census of India, Phanjang has 69 households. The effective literacy rate (i.e. the literacy rate of population excluding children aged 6 and below) is 94.42%.

Demographics (2011 Census)
	Total	Male	Female
Population	314	167	147
Children aged below 6 years	45	23	22
Scheduled caste	0	0	0
Scheduled tribe	314	167	147
Literates	254	139	115
Workers (all)	243	130	113
Main workers (total)	140	72	68
Main workers: Cultivators	112	58	54
Main workers: Agricultural labourers	4	0	4
Main workers: Household industry workers	8	5	3
Main workers: Other	16	9	7
Marginal workers (total)	103	58	45
Marginal workers: Cultivators	86	47	39
Marginal workers: Agricultural labourers	0	0	0
Marginal workers: Household industry workers	0	0	0
Marginal workers: Others	17	11	6
Non-workers	71	37	34
