= Inbung =

- Village
- Location Nagaland, India Inbung (India)
- Coordinates: 25.512190°N 93.605234°E
- Country: India
- State: Nagaland
- District: Peren
- Circle: Athibung

Population (2011)
  - Total: 598
- Time zone: UTC+5:30 (IST)
- Census code: 268340

Inbung is a village in the Peren district of Nagaland, India. It is located in the Athibung Circle.

== Demographics ==
According to the 2011 census of India, Inbung has 129 households. The effective literacy rate (i.e. the literacy rate of population excluding children aged 6 and below) is 78.85%.

Demographics (2011 Census)
	Total	Male	Female
Population	598	288	310
Children aged below 6 years	92	42	50
Scheduled caste	0	0	0
Scheduled tribe	588	284	304
Literates	399	201	198
Workers (all)	416	204	212
Main workers (total)	270	138	132
Main workers: Cultivators	236	121	115
Main workers: Agricultural labourers	0	0	0
Main workers: Household industry workers	0	0	0
Main workers: Other	34	17	17
Marginal workers (total)	146	66	80
Marginal workers: Cultivators	0	0	0
Marginal workers: Agricultural labourers	0	0	0
Marginal workers: Household industry workers	1	1	0
Marginal workers: Others	145	65	80
Non-workers	182	84	98
