= Beisumpuilwo =

Beisumpuilwo Beisumpuilwo (UR)
- village
- Location in Nagaland, India Beisumpuilwo (India)
- Coordinates: 25.522°N 93.680°E
- Country: India
- State: Nagaland
- District: Peren
- Circle: Kebai Khelma

Population (2011)
  - Total: 140
- Time zone: UTC+5:30 (IST)
- Census code: 268354

Beisumpuilwo is a village in the Peren district of Nagaland, India. It is located in the Kebai Khelma Circle.

== Demographics ==
According to the 2011 census of India, Beisumpuilwo (UR) had 29 households. The effective literacy rate (i.e. the literacy rate of population excluding children aged 6 and below) was 75.7%.

Demographics (2011 Census)
	Total	Male	Female
Population	140	79	61
Children aged below 6 years	33	23	10
Scheduled caste	0	0	0
Scheduled tribe	140	79	61
Literates	81	45	36
Workers (all)	87	47	40
Main workers (total)	72	40	32
Main workers: Cultivators	72	40	32
Main workers: Agricultural labourers	0	0	0
Main workers: Household industry workers	0	0	0
Main workers: Other	0	0	0
Marginal workers (total)	15	7	8
Marginal workers: Cultivators	14	6	8
Marginal workers: Agricultural labourers	0	0	0
Marginal workers: Household industry workers	0	0	0
Marginal workers: Others	1	1	0
Non-workers	53	32	21
