= Heunanbe =

Heunanbe (UR)
- village
- Location in Nagaland, India Heunanbe (UR) (India)
- Country: India
- State: Nagaland
- District: Peren
- Circle: Pedi (Ngwalwa)

Population (2011)
  - Total: 300
- Time zone: UTC+5:30 (IST)
- Census code: 268298

Heunanbe is a village in the Peren district of Nagaland, India. It is located in the Pedi (Ngwalwa) Circle.

== Demographics ==
According to the 2011 census of India, Heunanbe (UR) has 72 households. The effective literacy rate (i.e. the literacy rate of population excluding children aged 6 and below) is 58.14%.

Demographics (2011 Census)
	Total	Male	Female
Population	300	159	141
Children aged below 6 years	85	49	36
Scheduled caste	0	0	0
Scheduled tribe	133	63	70
Literates	125	68	57
Workers (all)	134	69	65
Main workers (total)	133	69	64
Main workers: Cultivators	65	32	33
Main workers: Agricultural labourers	0	0	0
Main workers: Household industry workers	0	0	0
Main workers: Other	68	37	31
Marginal workers (total)	1	0	1
Marginal workers: Cultivators	0	0	0
Marginal workers: Agricultural labourers	0	0	0
Marginal workers: Household industry workers	0	0	0
Marginal workers: Others	1	0	1
Non-workers	166	90	76
