= Peletkie =

- village
- Location Nagaland, India Peletkie (India)
- Coordinates: 25.526570°N 93.745130°E
- Country: India
- State: Nagaland
- District: Peren
- Circle: Peren

Population (2011)
  - Total: 300
- Time zone: UTC+5:30 (IST)
- Census code: 268394

Peletkie is a village in the Peren district of Nagaland, India. It is located in the Peren Circle.

== Demographics ==
According to the 2011 census of India, Peletkie has 64 households. The effective literacy rate (i.e. the literacy rate of population excluding children aged 6 and below) is 67.46%.

Demographics (2011 Census)
	Total	Male	Female
Population	300	151	149
Children aged below 6 years	48	30	18
Scheduled caste	0	0	0
Scheduled tribe	300	151	149
Literates	170	96	74
Workers (all)	192	93	99
Main workers (total)	142	67	75
Main workers: Cultivators	130	58	72
Main workers: Agricultural labourers	0	0	0
Main workers: Household industry workers	0	0	0
Main workers: Other	12	9	3
Marginal workers (total)	50	26	24
Marginal workers: Cultivators	40	21	19
Marginal workers: Agricultural labourers	0	0	0
Marginal workers: Household industry workers	1	1	0
Marginal workers: Others	9	4	5
Non-workers	108	58	50
