= NTU =

Ntu is a village in Nagaland, India.

NTU may stand for:

== Higher education ==
- Nantong University, a public university in Nantong, Jiangsu, China
- Nanyang Technological University, a public university in Singapore
- National Taiwan University, a public university in Taiwan
- National Technological University, a public university in Argentina
- National Textile University, a public university in Faisalabad, Punjab, Pakistan
- North Texas University, a public university in Texas, United States
- Nottingham Trent University, a public university in Nottingham, England, United Kingdom

== Organizations ==
- National Taxpayers Union, a nonprofit organization in the United States
- National Typographical Union, a predecessor of the International Typographical Union
- National Team Unity, a political party in Trinidad and Tobago
- National Television Company of Ukraine, a former name of Ukrainian television broadcaster

== Place ==
- Naval Air Station Oceana (IATA code), a military airport in Virginia Beach, Virginia, United States

== Technological terms ==
- Network Termination Unit, a networking device that connects the PSTN to CPE
- Nephelometric Turbidity Unit, a measure of the cloudiness of a liquid
- Nevada–Texas–Utah Retort, a shale oil extraction technology
- New Threat Upgrade, a US Navy anti-air warfare ships system upgrade
- NTU method uses the Number of Transfer Units to calculate the effectiveness of a heat exchanger

== See also ==
- National Taiwan University Hospital, a medical facility in Taipei
  - NTU Hospital metro station, a metro station of the Taipei Metro
