= Lower Sinjol =

- Village
- Location Nagaland, India Lower Sinjol (India)
- Coordinates: 25.518260°N 93.479003°E
- Country: India
- State: Nagaland
- District: Peren
- Circle: Kebai Khelma

Population (2011)
  - Total: 87
- Time zone: UTC+5:30 (IST)
- Census code: 268351

Lower Sinjol is a village in the Peren district of Nagaland, India. It is located in the Kebai Khelma Circle.

== Demographics ==
According to the 2011 census of India, Lower Sinjol has 25 households. The effective literacy rate (i.e. the literacy rate of population excluding children aged 6 and below) is 92.41%.

Demographics (2011 Census)
	Total	Male	Female
Population	87	52	35
Children aged below 6 years	8	6	2
Scheduled caste	0	0	0
Scheduled tribe	87	52	35
Literates	73	44	29
Workers (all)	77	44	33
Main workers (total)	67	36	31
Main workers: Cultivators	56	31	25
Main workers: Agricultural labourers	11	5	6
Main workers: Household industry workers	0	0	0
Main workers: Other	0	0	0
Marginal workers (total)	10	8	2
Marginal workers: Cultivators	4	4	0
Marginal workers: Agricultural labourers	3	1	2
Marginal workers: Household industry workers	2	2	0
Marginal workers: Others	1	1	0
Non-workers	10	8	2
