= Old Soget =

- village
- Location Nagaland, India Old Soget (India)
- Coordinates: 25.501513°N 93.578780°E
- Country: India
- State: Nagaland
- District: Peren
- Circle: Khelma

Population (2011)
  - Total: 370
- Time zone: UTC+5:30 (IST)
- Census code: 268357

Old Soget is a village in the Peren district of Nagaland, India. It is located in the Khelma Circle.

== Demographics ==
According to the 2011 census of India, Old Soget has 71 households. The effective literacy rate (i.e. the literacy rate of population excluding children aged 6 and below) is 72.51%.

Demographics (2011 Census)
	Total	Male	Female
Population	370	198	172
Children aged below 6 years	79	37	42
Scheduled caste	0	0	0
Scheduled tribe	364	196	168
Literates	211	122	89
Workers (all)	261	138	123
Main workers (total)	55	37	18
Main workers: Cultivators	40	26	14
Main workers: Agricultural labourers	0	0	0
Main workers: Household industry workers	0	0	0
Main workers: Other	15	11	4
Marginal workers (total)	206	101	105
Marginal workers: Cultivators	169	81	88
Marginal workers: Agricultural labourers	0	0	0
Marginal workers: Household industry workers	1	0	1
Marginal workers: Others	36	20	16
Non-workers	109	60	49
