= Kendung =

- village
- Location in Nagaland, India Kendung (India)
- Coordinates: 25.349183°N 93.689405°E
- Country: India
- State: Nagaland
- District: Peren
- Circle: Peren

Population (2011)
  - Total: 101
- Time zone: UTC+5:30 (IST)
- Census code: 268401

Kendung is a village in the Peren district of Nagaland, India. It is located in the Peren Circle.

== Demographics ==
According to the 2011 census of India, Kendung has 21 households. The effective literacy rate (i.e. the literacy rate of population excluding children aged 6 and below) is 86.21%.

Demographics (2011 Census)
	Total	Male	Female
Population	101	55	46
Children aged below 6 years	14	7	7
Scheduled caste	0	0	0
Scheduled tribe	101	55	46
Literates	75	43	32
Workers (all)	81	44	37
Main workers (total)	49	27	22
Main workers: Cultivators	46	24	22
Main workers: Agricultural labourers	0	0	0
Main workers: Household industry workers	0	0	0
Main workers: Other	3	3	0
Marginal workers (total)	32	17	15
Marginal workers: Cultivators	9	5	4
Marginal workers: Agricultural labourers	0	0	0
Marginal workers: Household industry workers	0	0	0
Marginal workers: Others	23	12	11
Non-workers	20	11	9
