= Zeme Naga =

Zeme Naga may refer to:

- Zeme people
- Zeme language
