= Armstrong Pame =

Indian Administrative Service officer

Armstrong Pame, IAS
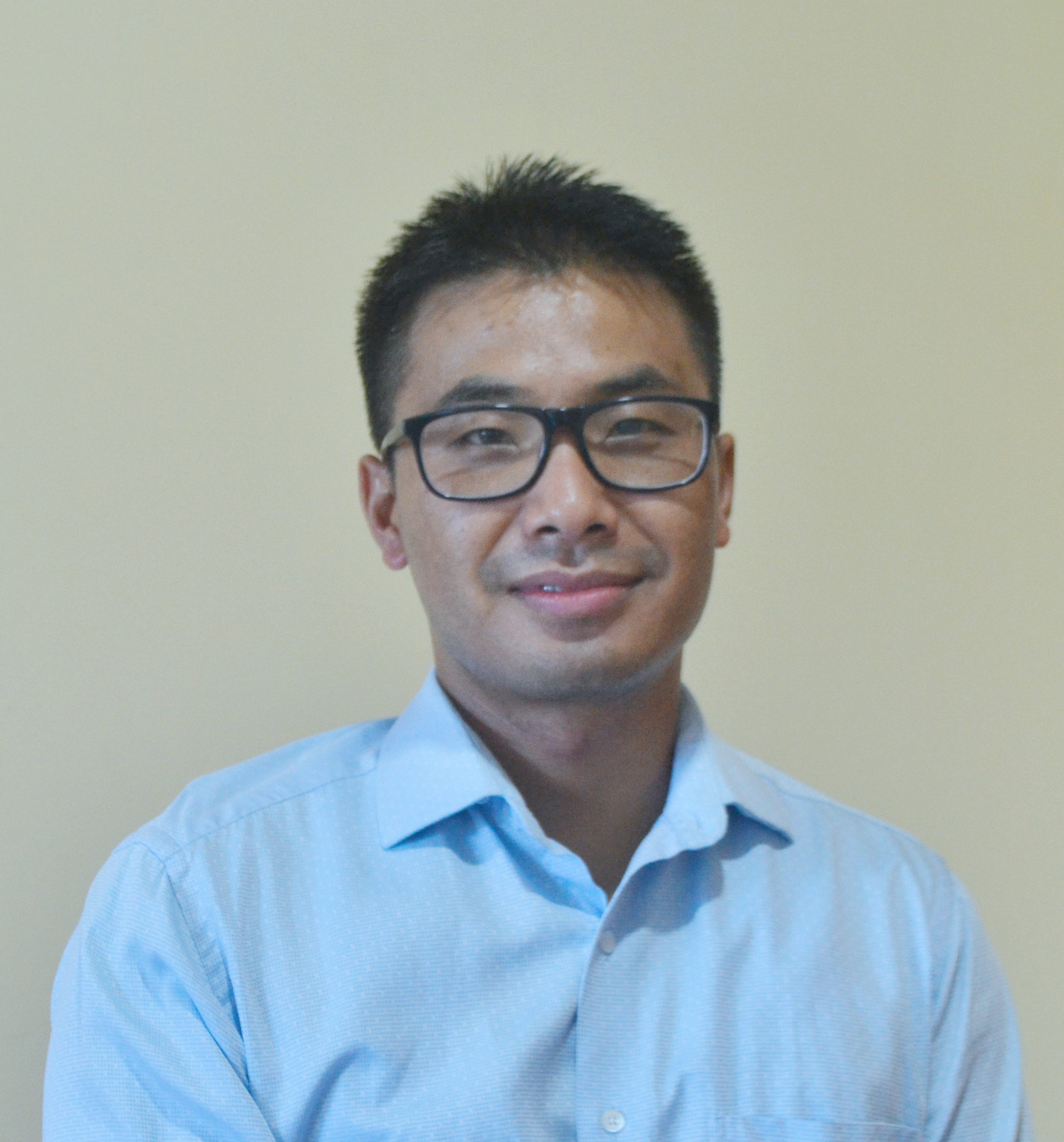
- Born: 23 September 1984 (age 42)
- Occupation: Indian Administrative Service
- Spouse: Yini Evelyn (m.16 Dec 2017)
- Writing career
- Notable works: Armstrong is notable for his initiative to build 100 km long roads in the most remote villages of the Tamenglong through public contributions and his savings.

Armstrong Pame is an officer of the Indian Administrative Service (IAS) of 2009 batch belonging to Manipur cadre. He belongs to Zeme Naga. After clearing UPSC, Pame joined the Indian Administrative Service and was placed into the Manipur cadre of the 2009 batch.He is currently serving as Joint secretary to the Government of India Department of Higher Education (India) Ministry of Education (India) .Armstrong Pame is a recipient of several awards including India's Most Eminent IAS Officer Award 2015 and India's distinguished IAS Officers Award 2021.

Armstrong Pame is also popularly known as the "Miracle Man" for initiating the building of a 100 km long road in one of the most remote parts of the country through crowd funding with the villagers of the area and people from different parts of the world. Armstrong Pame is a Physics (Hons.) graduate from St. Stephen's College, Delhi University and has completed Transformational Leadership Course from Oxford University and Leadership in 21st Century Executive Education Module from Harvard Kennedy School. He is also a Young Global leader of Class of 2018 declared by World Economic Forum.

Armstrong Pame is a motivational speaker at various platforms including TEDx, corporates, universities and other notable public events.

== Early life and education ==
Armstrong Pame hails from Impa village, Tousem sub-division of Tamenglong district of Manipur and did his schooling till Class 10 in Tamenglong at Pretty Lamb Institute, Christian Grammar School and United Builders School in Manipur. He then finished higher secondary from St. Edmund College, Shillong. He completed his bachelor's degree in Physics from St. Stephen's College, Delhi in 2005. Presently he is on Central Deputation as director, department of school education and literacy. He previously served as deputy secretary, ministry of information and broadcasting.

== The Miracle Man of India ==
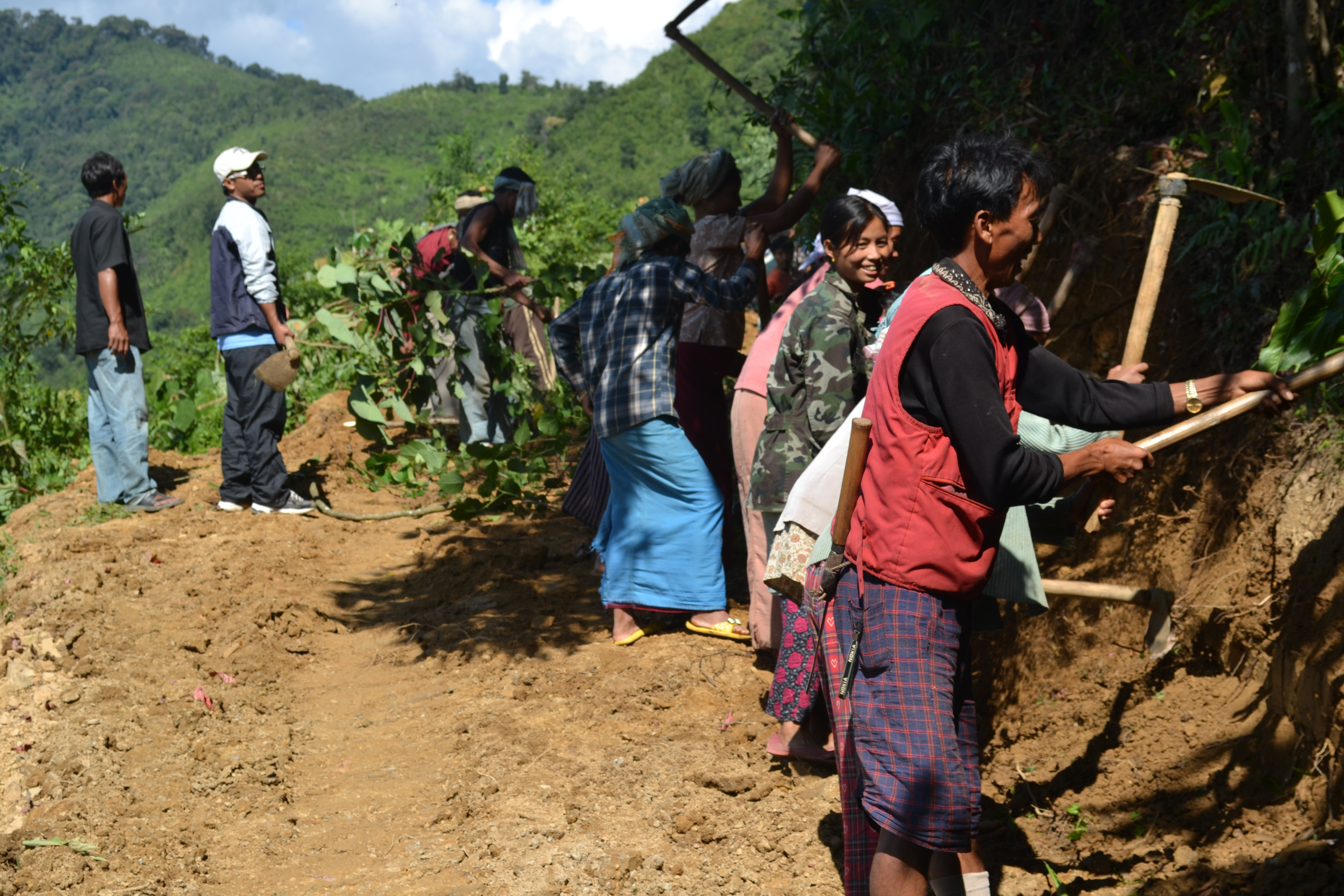

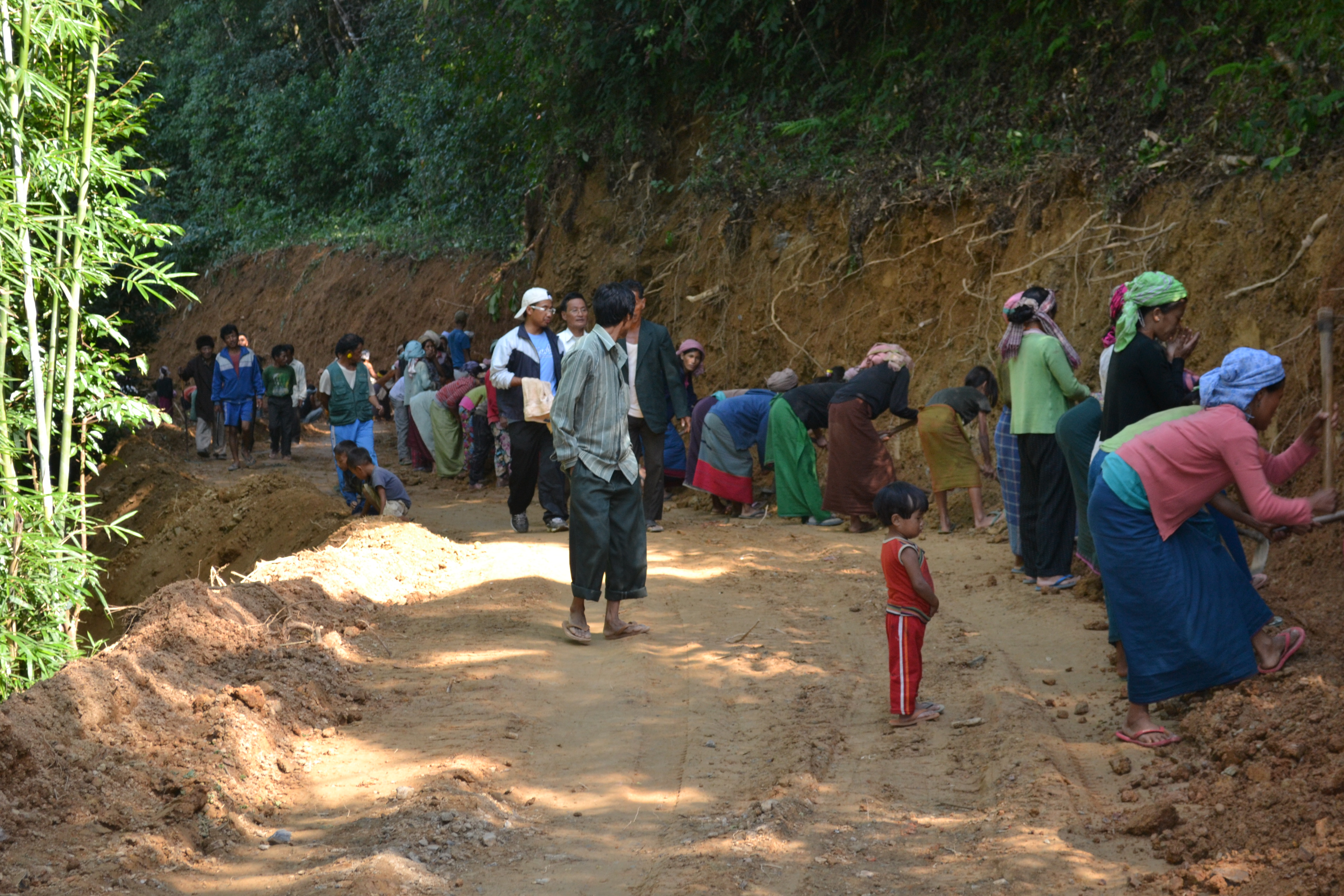

He has earned the sobriquet 'Miracle Man' for building a 100 km road famously known as the "Peoples' Road" connecting Manipur to Nagaland and Assam. This "People's Road" has now been declared as National Highway 137 by the Ministry of Road Transport and Highways.

In August 2012, he initiated public participation to raise over Rs. 50 lakhs for this purpose through Facebook.

For his efforts in building the road with public contribution and volunteers he was invited to Facebook headquarters in California and was also hosted for high tea by Sheryl Sandberg at DAVOS World Economic Forum 2019.

== Awards and recognition ==
- Armstrong Pame is a recipient of several awards including India's Most Eminent IAS Officer Award '2015 and India's distinguished IAS Officers Award 2022.
- In 2012, he was nominated for CNN-IBN Indian of the Year in Public Service category.
- He was also invited to the talk show Aaj Ki Raat Hai Zindagi (AKRHZ) by the host Amitabh Bachchan in 2015 as the 'hero' of the 9th episode. On the show which was aired on Star Plus he could be seen performing the noted song Give Me Some Sunshine along with the Bollywood actor Boman Irani.
- He is declared as young Global Leader of the class of 2018 by the World Economic Forum.

== Career ==
Armstrong Pame has served in various positions including Sub-divisional magistrate in some of the most challenging terrains at Tousem, Tadubi and Paomata. He served as the Deputy Commissioner (India) at Kamjong as its first Deputy Commissioner (India) and later at his native district Tamenglong. He also served as Special Secretary, Planning (R&D), Director, Youth Affairs and Sports in the Government of Manipur.

Previously he served as Deputy Secretary in Ministry of Information and Broadcasting (India)

And after promotion as Director Ministry of Information and Broadcasting (India).

Also Served as Director Department of School Education and Literacy Ministry of Education (India) .

Currently after promotion he is serving as Joint secretary to the Government of India Department of Higher Education (India) Ministry of Education (India).

== Other initiatives ==
Armstrong Pame is also the founding curator of the Global Shapers Community, Imphal hub under the World Economic Forum. Armstrong Pame is also a regular TedX Speaker at various universities and public forums including at IIMs, IITs, engineering and other universities like Delhi University, Tata Institute of Social Sciences etc. He has also successfully completed Transformational Leadership Course from Oxford University and Leadership in 21st Century Executive Education Module from Harvard Kennedy School. He collaborated with CHD Group to support the Government of Manipur with upscaling the surge capacity of District Hospitals in Tamenglong, Kamjong, Chandel and other Districts.
