= New Ngaolong =

- village
- Location Nagaland, India New Ngaolong (India)
- Coordinates: 25.302633°N 93.503439°E
- Country: India
- State: Nagaland
- District: Peren
- Circle: Kebai Khelma

Population (2011)
  - Total: 273
- Time zone: UTC+5:30 (IST)
- Census code: 268363

New Ngaolong is a village in the Peren district of Nagaland, India. It is located in the Kebai Khelma Circle.

== Demographics ==
According to the 2011 census of India, New Ngaolong has 59 households. The effective literacy rate (i.e. the literacy rate of population excluding children aged 6 and below) is 68.88%.

Demographics (2011 Census)
	Total	Male	Female
Population	273	128	145
Children aged below 6 years	77	29	48
Scheduled caste	0	0	0
Scheduled tribe	265	123	142
Literates	135	72	63
Workers (all)	155	76	79
Main workers (total)	120	62	58
Main workers: Cultivators	108	57	51
Main workers: Agricultural labourers	3	1	2
Main workers: Household industry workers	0	0	0
Main workers: Other	9	4	5
Marginal workers (total)	35	14	21
Marginal workers: Cultivators	27	10	17
Marginal workers: Agricultural labourers	0	0	0
Marginal workers: Household industry workers	0	0	0
Marginal workers: Others	8	4	4
Non-workers	118	52	66
