= New Soget =

- village
- Location Nagaland, India New Soget (India)
- Coordinates: 25.561257°N 93.474302°E
- Country: India
- State: Nagaland
- District: Peren
- Circle: Khelma

Population (2011)
  - Total: 135
- Time zone: UTC+5:30 (IST)
- Census code: 268353

New Soget is a village in the Peren district of Nagaland, India. It is located in the Khelma Circle.

== Demographics ==
According to the 2011 census of India, New Soget has 27 households. The effective literacy rate (i.e. the literacy rate of population excluding children aged 6 and below) is 96.19%.

Demographics (2011 Census)
	Total	Male	Female
Population	135	83	52
Children aged below 6 years	30	22	8
Scheduled caste	0	0	0
Scheduled tribe	135	83	52
Literates	101	59	42
Workers (all)	85	48	37
Main workers (total)	75	42	33
Main workers: Cultivators	73	40	33
Main workers: Agricultural labourers	0	0	0
Main workers: Household industry workers	0	0	0
Main workers: Other	2	2	0
Marginal workers (total)	10	6	4
Marginal workers: Cultivators	3	2	1
Marginal workers: Agricultural labourers	7	4	3
Marginal workers: Household industry workers	0	0	0
Marginal workers: Others	0	0	0
Non-workers	50	35	15
