= Old Puilwa =

- village
- Location in Nagaland, India Old Puilwa (India)
- Coordinates: 25.437437°N 93.747008°E
- Country: India
- State: Nagaland
- District: Peren
- Circle: Peren

Population (2011)
  - Total: 199
- Time zone: UTC+5:30 (IST)
- Census code: 268399

Old Puilwa is a village in the Peren district of Nagaland, India. It is located in the Peren Circle.

== Demographics ==
According to the 2011 census of India, Old Puilwa has 37 households. The effective literacy rate (i.e. the literacy rate of population excluding children aged 6 and below) is 85.19%.

Demographics (2011 Census)
	Total	Male	Female
Population	199	95	104
Children aged below 6 years	37	21	16
Scheduled caste	0	0	0
Scheduled tribe	197	93	104
Literates	138	65	73
Workers (all)	93	45	48
Main workers (total)	89	45	44
Main workers: Cultivators	69	31	38
Main workers: Agricultural labourers	1	1	0
Main workers: Household industry workers	1	1	0
Main workers: Other	18	12	6
Marginal workers (total)	4	0	4
Marginal workers: Cultivators	0	0	0
Marginal workers: Agricultural labourers	0	0	0
Marginal workers: Household industry workers	0	0	0
Marginal workers: Others	4	0	4
Non-workers	106	50	56
