= Mpai =

- village
- Location in Nagaland, India Mpai (India)
- Coordinates: 25.383231°N 93.709118°E
- Country: India
- State: Nagaland
- District: Peren
- Circle: Peren

Population (2011)
  - Total: 693
- Time zone: UTC+5:30 (IST)
- Census code: 268400

Mpai is a village in the Peren district of Nagaland, India. It is located in the Peren Circle.

== Demographics ==
According to the 2011 census of India, Mpai has 174 households. The effective literacy rate (i.e. the literacy rate of population excluding children aged 6 and below) is 63.11%.

Demographics (2011 Census)
	Total	Male	Female
Population	693	355	338
Children aged below 6 years	159	86	73
Scheduled caste	0	0	0
Scheduled tribe	693	355	338
Literates	337	202	135
Workers (all)	374	188	186
Main workers (total)	280	141	139
Main workers: Cultivators	260	126	134
Main workers: Agricultural labourers	1	1	0
Main workers: Household industry workers	2	1	1
Main workers: Other	17	13	4
Marginal workers (total)	94	47	47
Marginal workers: Cultivators	45	20	25
Marginal workers: Agricultural labourers	3	3	0
Marginal workers: Household industry workers	5	2	3
Marginal workers: Others	41	22	19
Non-workers	319	167	152
