= Ntu =

- village
- Location in Nagaland, India Ntu (India)
- Coordinates: 25.218680°N 93.604842°E
- Country: India
- State: Nagaland
- District: Peren
- Circle: Tening

Population (2011)
  - Total: 1,153
- Time zone: UTC+5:30 (IST)
- Census code: 268390

Ntu is a village in the Peren district of Nagaland, India. It is located in the Tening Circle.

== Demographics ==
According to the 2011 census of India, Ntu has 209 households. The effective literacy rate (i.e. the literacy rate of population excluding children aged 6 and below) is 76.35%.

Demographics (2011 Census)
| | Total | Male | Female |
|---|---|---|---|
| Population | 1153 | 608 | 545 |
| Children aged below 6 years | 117 | 58 | 59 |
| Scheduled caste | 0 | 0 | 0 |
| Scheduled tribe | 1145 | 602 | 543 |
| Literates | 791 | 448 | 343 |
| Workers (all) | 870 | 456 | 414 |
| Main workers (total) | 463 | 235 | 228 |
| Main workers: Cultivators | 327 | 146 | 181 |
| Main workers: Agricultural labourers | 3 | 3 | 0 |
| Main workers: Household industry workers | 3 | 1 | 2 |
| Main workers: Other | 130 | 85 | 45 |
| Marginal workers (total) | 407 | 221 | 186 |
| Marginal workers: Cultivators | 30 | 18 | 12 |
| Marginal workers: Agricultural labourers | 0 | 0 | 0 |
| Marginal workers: Household industry workers | 40 | 17 | 23 |
| Marginal workers: Others | 337 | 186 | 151 |
| Non-workers | 283 | 152 | 131 |
