= New Tesen =

- village
- Location in Nagaland, India New Tesen (India)
- Coordinates: 25.426274°N 93.642835°E
- Country: India
- State: Nagaland
- District: Peren
- Circle: Tening

Population (2011)
  - Total: 2,093
- Time zone: UTC+5:30 (IST)
- Census code: 268373

New Tesen is a village in the Peren district of Nagaland, India. It is located in the Tening Circle.

== Demographics ==
According to the 2011 census of India, New Tesen has 324 households. The effective literacy rate (i.e. the literacy rate of population excluding children aged 6 and below) is 90.91%.

Demographics (2011 Census)
	Total	Male	Female
Population	2093	1178	915
Children aged below 6 years	200	118	82
Scheduled caste	0	0	0
Scheduled tribe	2085	1171	914
Literates	1721	993	728
Workers (all)	1482	836	646
Main workers (total)	823	445	378
Main workers: Cultivators	624	320	304
Main workers: Agricultural labourers	2	1	1
Main workers: Household industry workers	6	5	1
Main workers: Other	191	119	72
Marginal workers (total)	659	391	268
Marginal workers: Cultivators	2	1	1
Marginal workers: Agricultural labourers	181	92	89
Marginal workers: Household industry workers	463	289	174
Marginal workers: Others	13	9	4
Non-workers	611	342	269
