= Nsenlwa =

- village
- Location Nagaland, India Nsenlwa (India)
- Coordinates: 25.443173°N 93.482242°E
- Country: India
- State: Nagaland
- District: Peren
- Circle: Kebai Khelma

Population (2011)
  - Total: 238
- Time zone: UTC+5:30 (IST)
- Census code: 268356

Nsenlwa is a village in the Peren district of Nagaland, India. It is located in the Kebai Khelma Circle.

== Demographics ==
According to the 2011 census of India, Nsenlwa has 50 households. The effective literacy rate (i.e. the literacy rate of population excluding children aged 6 and below) is 66.28%.

Demographics (2011 Census)
	Total	Male	Female
Population	238	118	120
Children aged below 6 years	66	33	33
Scheduled caste	0	0	0
Scheduled tribe	238	118	120
Literates	114	63	51
Workers (all)	123	62	61
Main workers (total)	102	58	44
Main workers: Cultivators	96	55	41
Main workers: Agricultural labourers	0	0	0
Main workers: Household industry workers	0	0	0
Main workers: Other	6	3	3
Marginal workers (total)	21	4	17
Marginal workers: Cultivators	17	2	15
Marginal workers: Agricultural labourers	0	0	0
Marginal workers: Household industry workers	0	0	0
Marginal workers: Others	4	2	2
Non-workers	115	56	59
