= Old Tesen =

- village
- Location in Nagaland, India Old Tesen (India)
- Coordinates: 25.468178°N 93.664622°E
- Country: India
- State: Nagaland
- District: Peren
- Circle: Tening

Population (2011)
  - Total: 2,145
- Time zone: UTC+5:30 (IST)
- Census code: 268374

Old Tesen is a village in the Peren district of Nagaland, India. It is located in the Tening Circle.

== Demographics ==
According to the 2011 census of India, Old Tesen has 333 households. The effective literacy rate (i.e. the literacy rate of population excluding children aged 6 and below) is 72.3%.

Demographics (2011 Census)
	Total	Male	Female
Population	2145	1047	1098
Children aged below 6 years	228	110	118
Scheduled caste	0	0	0
Scheduled tribe	2136	1044	1092
Literates	1386	712	674
Workers (all)	1158	586	572
Main workers (total)	1015	513	502
Main workers: Cultivators	918	453	465
Main workers: Agricultural labourers	2	1	1
Main workers: Household industry workers	1	1	0
Main workers: Other	94	58	36
Marginal workers (total)	143	73	70
Marginal workers: Cultivators	10	6	4
Marginal workers: Agricultural labourers	0	0	0
Marginal workers: Household industry workers	0	0	0
Marginal workers: Others	133	67	66
Non-workers	987	461	526
