= Sailhem =

- village
- Location Nagaland, India Sailhem (India)
- Coordinates: 25.453°N 93.437°E
- Country: India
- State: Nagaland
- District: Peren
- Circle: Khelma

Population (2011)
  - Total: 264
- Time zone: UTC+5:30 (IST)
- Census code: 268359

Sailhem is a village in the Peren district of Nagaland, India. It is located in the Khelma Circle.

== Demographics ==
According to the 2011 census of India, Sailhem has 80 households. The effective literacy rate (i.e. the literacy rate of population excluding children aged 6 and below) is 60.58%.

Demographics (2011 Census)
	Total	Male	Female
Population	264	144	120
Children aged below 6 years	56	33	23
Scheduled caste	0	0	0
Scheduled tribe	264	144	120
Literates	126	69	57
Workers (all)	189	106	83
Main workers (total)	158	97	61
Main workers: Cultivators	151	95	56
Main workers: Agricultural labourers	4	1	3
Main workers: Household industry workers	2	0	2
Main workers: Other	1	1	0
Marginal workers (total)	31	9	22
Marginal workers: Cultivators	26	7	19
Marginal workers: Agricultural labourers	1	0	1
Marginal workers: Household industry workers	1	1	0
Marginal workers: Others	3	1	2
Non-workers	75	38	37
