= Kelagim =

Kelagim Kelagim (UR)
- village
- Location in Nagaland, India Kelagim (India)
- Coordinates: 25.560231°N 93.880819°E
- Country: India
- State: Nagaland
- District: Peren
- Circle: Pedi (Ngwalwa)

Population (2011)
  - Total: 61
- Time zone: UTC+5:30 (IST)
- Census code: 268303

Kelagim is a village in the Peren district of Nagaland, India. It is located in the Pedi (Ngwalwa) Circle.

== Demographics ==
According to the 2011 census of India, Kelagim has 15 households. The effective literacy rate (i.e. the literacy rate of population excluding children aged 6 and below) is 55.32%.

Demographics (2011 Census)
	Total	Male	Female
Population	61	32	29
Children aged below 6 years	14	8	6
Scheduled caste	0	0	0
Scheduled tribe	61	32	29
Literates	26	17	9
Workers (all)	32	17	15
Main workers (total)	32	17	15
Main workers: Cultivators	31	16	15
Main workers: Agricultural labourers	0	0	0
Main workers: Household industry workers	0	0	0
Main workers: Other	1	1	0
Marginal workers (total)	0	0	0
Marginal workers: Cultivators	0	0	0
Marginal workers: Agricultural labourers	0	0	0
Marginal workers: Household industry workers	0	0	0
Marginal workers: Others	0	0	0
Non-workers	29	15	14
