= Phaikolum =

- village
- Location Nagaland, India Phaikolum (India)
- Coordinates: 25.490234°N 93.482298°E
- Country: India
- State: Nagaland
- District: Peren
- Circle: Kebai Khelma

Population (2011)
  - Total: 97
- Time zone: UTC+5:30 (IST)
- Census code: 268361

Phaikolum is a village in the Peren district of Nagaland, India. It is located in the Kebai Khelma Circle.

== Demographics ==
According to the 2011 census of India, Phaikolum has 21 households. The effective literacy rate (i.e. the literacy rate of population excluding children aged 6 and below) is 92.41%.

Demographics (2011 Census)
	Total	Male	Female
Population	97	42	55
Children aged below 6 years	18	8	10
Scheduled caste	0	0	0
Scheduled tribe	97	42	55
Literates	73	33	40
Workers (all)	69	30	39
Main workers (total)	19	17	2
Main workers: Cultivators	14	14	0
Main workers: Agricultural labourers	0	0	0
Main workers: Household industry workers	1	1	0
Main workers: Other	4	2	2
Marginal workers (total)	50	13	37
Marginal workers: Cultivators	41	9	32
Marginal workers: Agricultural labourers	0	0	0
Marginal workers: Household industry workers	2	2	0
Marginal workers: Others	7	2	5
Non-workers	28	12	16
