= Ikeisingram =

- village
- Location Nagaland, India Ikeisingram (India)
- Coordinates: 25.454290°N 93.469833°E
- Country: India
- State: Nagaland
- District: Peren
- Circle: Kebai Khelma

Population (2011)
  - Total: 229
- Time zone: UTC+5:30 (IST)
- Census code: 268355

Ikeisingram is a village in the Peren district of Nagaland, India. It is located in the Kebai Khelma Circle.

== Demographics ==
According to the 2011 census of India, Ikeisingram has 62 households. The effective literacy rate (i.e. the literacy rate of population excluding children aged 6 and below) is 66.06%.

Demographics (2011 Census)
	Total	Male	Female
Population	229	120	109
Children aged below 6 years	64	32	32
Scheduled caste	0	0	0
Scheduled tribe	229	120	109
Literates	109	66	43
Workers (all)	141	77	64
Main workers (total)	120	65	55
Main workers: Cultivators	111	61	50
Main workers: Agricultural labourers	2	2	0
Main workers: Household industry workers	0	0	0
Main workers: Other	7	2	5
Marginal workers (total)	21	12	9
Marginal workers: Cultivators	17	9	8
Marginal workers: Agricultural labourers	0	0	0
Marginal workers: Household industry workers	0	0	0
Marginal workers: Others	4	3	1
Non-workers	88	43	45
