= Punglwa =

- village
- Location Nagaland, India Punglwa (India)
- Coordinates: 25.622287°N 93.837128°E
- Country: India
- State: Nagaland
- District: Peren
- Circle: Pedi (Ngwalwa)

Population (2011)
  - Total: 1,254
- Time zone: UTC+5:30 (IST)
- Census code: 268294

Punglwa is a village in the Peren district of Nagaland, India. It is located in the Pedi (Ngwalwa) Circle.

== Demographics ==
According to the 2011 census of India, Punglwa has 218 households. The effective literacy rate (i.e. the literacy rate of population excluding children aged 6 and below) is 79.61%.

Demographics (2011 census)
	Total	Male	Female
Population	1254	832	422
Children aged below 6 years	165	72	93
Scheduled caste	0	0	0
Scheduled tribe	1088	688	400
Literates	867	657	210
Workers (all)	575	308	267
Main workers (total)	224	156	68
Main workers: Cultivators	56	40	16
Main workers: Agricultural labourers	0	0	0
Main workers: Household industry workers	0	0	0
Main workers: Other	168	116	52
Marginal workers (total)	351	152	199
Marginal workers: Cultivators	153	40	113
Marginal workers: Agricultural labourers	2	0	2
Marginal workers: Household industry workers	1	0	1
Marginal workers: Others	195	112	83
Non-workers	679	524	155
