= Nakamh-Riangsuanneic =

2021 Rongmei film directed by Kachangthai Gonmei

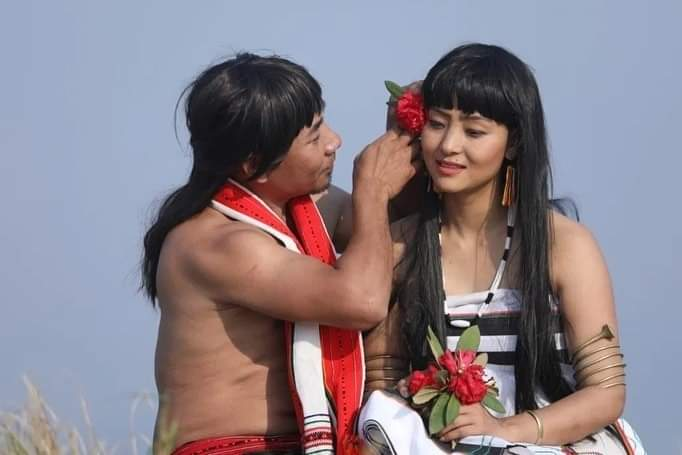
- Nakamh-Riangsuanneic
- Directed by: Kachangthai Gonmei
- Written by: K.G. Neilalung; Kachangthai Gonmei
- Produced by: Kachangthai Gonmei
- Starring: Kachangthai Gonmei; Achingna Kamei
- Cinematography: L Hemanta; Ashing Thaimei
- Music by: Joseph Gonmei
- Production company: Hornbill Entertainment Production
- Release date: 19 February 2021
- Running time: 120 minutes
- Country: India
- Language: Rongmei

Nakamh-Riangsuanneic is a 2021 Indian Rongmei language film directed by Kachangthai Gonmei and produced by Hornbill Entertainment Production. The film stars Kachangthai Gonmei and Achingna Kamei in the lead role and premiered at International Folklore film festival in Payyanur, India. It was one of the only 2 films from Manipur to receive Central Board of Film Certification in the year 2020.

== Premise ==
The film is based on the folklore of the Rongmei Naga community in Northeast India, tells the story of an orphan named Nikamh who falls in love with Riangsuanneic, daughter of a rich man in Makuilongdi village.

== Cast ==
- Kachangthai Gonmei
- Achingna Kamei
- Lambi Rongmei
- Ahiambung

== Production ==
The movie was shot in Tamenglong district of Manipur and Cachar district of Assam.

== Release ==
The film was released officially in the year 2021 and has been screened regularly across India.

== Accolades ==
Year	Award	Category	Recipient	Result
2021	International Folklore film festival	Best film	Kachangthai Gonmei	Nominated
2022	Prag Cine Awards	Best film Northeast	Kachangthai Gonmei	Won
2022	Prag Cine Awards	Best Director North East	Kachangthai Gonmei	Won
2022	Prag Cine Awards	Best Actor North East	Kachangthai Gonmei	Won
