= Kipeujang =

Kipeujang Kipeujang (UR)
- village
- Location in Nagaland, India Kipeujang (India)
- Coordinates: 25.540446°N 93.766808°E
- Country: India
- State: Nagaland
- District: Peren
- Circle: Peren

Population (2011)
  - Total: 674
- Time zone: UTC+5:30 (IST)
- Census code: 268393

Kipeujang is a village in the Peren district of Nagaland, India. It is located in the Peren Circle.

== Demographics ==
According to the 2011 census of India, Kipeujang has 125 households. The effective literacy rate (i.e. the literacy rate of population excluding children aged 6 and below) is 84.62%.

Demographics (2011 Census)
	Total	Male	Female
Population	674	326	348
Children aged below 6 years	128	55	73
Scheduled caste	0	0	0
Scheduled tribe	628	303	325
Literates	462	247	215
Workers (all)	288	145	143
Main workers (total)	209	116	93
Main workers: Cultivators	128	60	68
Main workers: Agricultural labourers	1	1	0
Main workers: Household industry workers	5	4	1
Main workers: Other	75	51	24
Marginal workers (total)	79	29	50
Marginal workers: Cultivators	32	9	23
Marginal workers: Agricultural labourers	1	0	1
Marginal workers: Household industry workers	33	14	19
Marginal workers: Others	13	6	7
Non-workers	386	181	205
