= Songngou =

- village
- Location Nagaland, India Songngou (India)
- Coordinates: 25.538129°N 93.513408°E
- Country: India
- State: Nagaland
- District: Peren
- Circle: Kebai Khelma

Population (2011)
  - Total: 188
- Time zone: UTC+5:30 (IST)
- Census code: 268352

Songngou is a village in the Peren district of Nagaland, India. It is located in the Kebai Khelma Circle.

== Demographics ==
According to the 2011 census of India, Songngou has 47 households. The effective literacy rate (i.e. the literacy rate of population excluding children aged 6 and below) is 90.06%.

Demographics (2011 Census)
	Total	Male	Female
Population	188	91	97
Children aged below 6 years	27	15	12
Scheduled caste	0	0	0
Scheduled tribe	188	91	97
Literates	145	70	75
Workers (all)	141	68	73
Main workers (total)	86	52	34
Main workers: Cultivators	78	45	33
Main workers: Agricultural labourers	0	0	0
Main workers: Household industry workers	0	0	0
Main workers: Other	8	7	1
Marginal workers (total)	55	16	39
Marginal workers: Cultivators	48	14	34
Marginal workers: Agricultural labourers	5	2	3
Marginal workers: Household industry workers	0	0	0
Marginal workers: Others	2	0	2
Non-workers	47	23	24
