= Old Nkio =

Old Nkio Nkio (Old)
- village
- Location in Nagaland, India Old Nkio (India)
- Coordinates: 25.345405°N 93.567394°E
- Country: India
- State: Nagaland
- District: Peren
- Circle: Tening

Population (2011)
  - Total: 1,550
- Time zone: UTC+5:30 (IST)
- Census code: 268382

Old Nkio is a village in the Peren district of Nagaland, India. It is located in the Tening Circle.

== Demographics ==
According to the 2011 census of India, Nkio (Old) has 226 households. The effective literacy rate (i.e. the literacy rate of population excluding children aged 6 and below) is 57.04%.

Demographics (2011 Census)
| | Total | Male | Female |
|---|---|---|---|
| Population | 1550 | 805 | 745 |
| Children aged below 6 years | 186 | 103 | 83 |
| Scheduled caste | 0 | 0 | 0 |
| Scheduled tribe | 1542 | 802 | 740 |
| Literates | 778 | 442 | 336 |
| Workers (all) | 856 | 430 | 426 |
| Main workers (total) | 654 | 331 | 323 |
| Main workers: Cultivators | 637 | 324 | 313 |
| Main workers: Agricultural labourers | 7 | 4 | 3 |
| Main workers: Household industry workers | 3 | 0 | 3 |
| Main workers: Other | 7 | 3 | 4 |
| Marginal workers (total) | 202 | 99 | 103 |
| Marginal workers: Cultivators | 28 | 13 | 15 |
| Marginal workers: Agricultural labourers | 163 | 79 | 84 |
| Marginal workers: Household industry workers | 3 | 1 | 2 |
| Marginal workers: Others | 8 | 6 | 2 |
| Non-workers | 694 | 375 | 319 |
