= New Puilwa =

- village
- Location Nagaland, India New Puilwa (India)
- Coordinates: 25.443776°N 93.777670°E
- Country: India
- State: Nagaland
- District: Peren
- Circle: Peren

Population (2011)
  - Total: 221
- Time zone: UTC+5:30 (IST)
- Census code: 268398

New Puilwa is a village under Peren district of Nagaland, India. It is located in the Peren Circle. Tourist place list Hidden cave of Phizo, Rani Cave, Water fall (Nkwareuki), Barack river, etc.

== Demographics ==
According to the 2011 census of India, New Puilwa has 52 households. The effective literacy rate (i.e. the literacy rate of population excluding children aged 6 and below) is 82.25%.

Demographics (2011 Census)
	Total	Male	Female
Population	221	120	101
Children aged below 6 years	52	30	22
Scheduled caste	0	0	0
Scheduled tribe	217	117	100
Literates	139	79	60
Workers (all)	154	81	73
Main workers (total)	116	63	53
Main workers: Cultivators	103	60	43
Main workers: Agricultural labourers	2	0	2
Main workers: Household industry workers	5	1	4
Main workers: Other	6	2	4
Marginal workers (total)	38	18	20
Marginal workers: Cultivators	3	1	2
Marginal workers: Agricultural labourers	0	0	0
Marginal workers: Household industry workers	32	16	16
Marginal workers: Others	3	1	2
Non-workers	67	39	28
