= Poilwa Namci =

- village
- Location in Nagaland, India Poilwa Namci (India)
- Coordinates: 25.564°N 93.879°E
- Country: India
- State: Nagaland
- District: Peren
- Circle: Pedi (Ngwalwa)

Population (2011)
  - Total: 679
- Time zone: UTC+5:30 (IST)
- Census code: 268301

Poilwa Namci is a village in the Peren district of Nagaland, India. It is located in the Pedi (Ngwalwa) Circle.

== Demographics ==
According to the 2011 census of India, Poilwa Namci has 152 households. The effective literacy rate (i.e. the literacy rate of population excluding children aged 6 and below) is 80.63%.

Demographics (2011 Census)
	Total	Male	Female
Population	679	336	343
Children aged below 6 years	111	48	63
Scheduled caste	0	0	0
Scheduled tribe	603	299	304
Literates	458	253	205
Workers (all)	322	172	150
Main workers (total)	316	168	148
Main workers: Cultivators	184	73	111
Main workers: Agricultural labourers	1	1	0
Main workers: Household industry workers	1	1	0
Main workers: Other	130	93	37
Marginal workers (total)	6	4	2
Marginal workers: Cultivators	2	0	2
Marginal workers: Agricultural labourers	0	0	0
Marginal workers: Household industry workers	0	0	0
Marginal workers: Others	4	4	0
Non-workers	357	164	193
