= Ntangki National Park =

National park in India

- Intangki
- IUCN category II (national park)
- Location within Nagaland Location within India
- Interactive map of Ntangki National Park
- Location: Nagaland, India
- Nearest city: Chümoukedima
- Coordinates: 25°44′24″N 93°31′36″E
- Area: 200 km^{2} (77 sq mi)
- Established: 3 March 1993
- Governing body: Government of Nagaland

Ntangki National Park is a national park located in Peren District of Nagaland, India. It was first designated as a national park in 1993. Among the species that inhabit the park are the rare hoolock gibbon, golden langur, hornbill, Asian palm civet, black stork, tiger, white-breasted kingfisher, monitor lizard, python and sloth bear. The name "Ntangki" is derived from the Zeme dialect of the Zeliangrong Nagas.

== History ==
Ntangki Reserved Forest was established in 1923 with an approximate area of 181 km^{2} (44,800 acres). In 1927, Ntangki Reserved Forest was enlarged by 20.7 km^{2} (5,120 acres). In April 1975, the Government of Nagaland declared the Ntangki Reserved Forest as Ntangki Wildlife Sanctuary with an area of 202.02 km^{2} (20,202 ha). In March 1993, it was converted to Ntangki National Park.

== Fauna ==
In 2022, Asian forest tortoises (Manouria emys) were reintroduced into Ntangki National Park in collaboration with the Turtle Survival Alliance and Wildlife Conservation Society India.
