= Nkio B =

Nkio 'B'
- village
- Location in Nagaland, India Nkio 'B' (India)
- Coordinates: 25.394823°N 93.502917°E
- Country: India
- State: Nagaland
- District: Peren
- Circle: Kebai Khelma

Population (2011)
  - Total: 218
- Time zone: UTC+5:30 (IST)
- Census code: 268362

Nkio 'B' is a village in the Peren district of Nagaland, India. It is located in the Kebai Khelma Circle.

== Demographics ==
According to the 2011 census of India, Nkio 'B' has 57 households. The effective literacy rate (i.e. the literacy rate of population excluding children aged 6 and below) is 84.43%.

Demographics (2011 Census)
	Total	Male	Female
Population	218	117	101
Children aged below 6 years	51	24	27
Scheduled caste	0	0	0
Scheduled tribe	218	117	101
Literates	141	82	59
Workers (all)	158	86	72
Main workers (total)	90	57	33
Main workers: Cultivators	86	54	32
Main workers: Agricultural labourers	0	0	0
Main workers: Household industry workers	0	0	0
Main workers: Other	4	3	1
Marginal workers (total)	68	29	39
Marginal workers: Cultivators	40	15	25
Marginal workers: Agricultural labourers	0	0	0
Marginal workers: Household industry workers	0	0	0
Marginal workers: Others	28	14	14
Non-workers	60	31	29
