= Tamenglong district =

- District of Manipur
- Location in Manipur
- Coordinates: 24.9863°N 93.5°E
- Country: India
- State: Manipur
- Headquarters: Tamenglong

Area
  - Total: 3,315 km^{2} (1,280 sq mi)
  - Rank: 1

Population (2011) (Note: Includes the Nungba subdivision, which was made a separate district in 2016.)
  - Total: 170,651
  - Density: 51.48/km^{2} (133.3/sq mi)

Language(s)
  - Official: Meitei (Manipuri) and English (Note: Meitei language (officially known as Manipuri language) is the official language of Manipur. Other regional languages of different places in Manipur may either be predominantly spoken or not in their respective places but "Meitei" is always officially used.)
  - Regional: Rongmei, Liangmai and Zeme
- Time zone: UTC+5:30 (IST)
- ISO 3166 code: IN-MN-TA
- Website: tamenglong.nic.in

Tamenglong district (Meitei pronunciation: /tæmɛŋˈlɒŋ/) is one of the 16 districts of Manipur state in northeastern India. The district headquarters is Tamenglong. In 2011, Tamenglong was the least populous district in Manipur. In 2016, the Nungba subdivision was separated as a separate district. Tamenglong district is also the largest district of Manipur in 2024 with an area of 3,315 km2.

== History ==
In 1919, the British Government established four sub-divisions office in Manipur Hills known as North East Sub-Division, North West Sub-Division, South East Sub-Division and South West Sub-Division. The Headquarters of North West Sub-Division was set up at Khunjao, Tamenglong Village (Nriangluang) and Mr. William Shaw was appointed as the Sub-Divisional Officer. In 1923, the headquarters of Northwest sub-division was shifted to the present site known as Tamenglong headquarters some 3 km away from Khunjao. Later the Manipur North West sub-division was renamed as Tamenglong Sub-Division. Tamenglong became a full-fledged district in 1969 and the first Deputy Commissioner was posted.

== Geography ==
This district is bounded by Nagaland state and Senapati district on the north, by the Assam state on the west, by the newly created Noney district on the south and by Kangpokpi district (formerly part of Senapati district) on the east. The Tamenglong town is the headquarters of this district. The 2011 district, including the Nungba subdivision, occupies an area of 4753 sq km.

The district contains virgin forests, exotic orchids, rare and endangered plants, and wildlife. The forests contain tropical evergreen forests, subtropical forests and bamboo brakes. The dense tropical evergreen forests are located along the riversides across the district. Tamenglong is called the Land of the Hornbill as the , Great Pied Hornbill and Indian Pied Hornbill species are found here. Wildflowers include several types of orchids, including epiphytic, lithophytic and terrestrial.

== Places of interest ==
Tamenglong district of Manipur has a topography of irregular undulation with turbulent rivers, waterfalls, caves, lakes, and dense tropical forests covering the land.

- Along the river Barak there is a series of seven waterfalls.
- The Tharon cave (Chalem-Ky), which is found in the Liangmai land, is located at about 27 km from the district HQ. The map of the entire cave is engraved and painted on a stone at the main entrance. Archaeological excavation of the cave shows connections to the Hoabinhian culture of North Vietnam.
- Zeilad Lake at Makoi (Atengba) is associated with a number of pythons, fish, and water birds. There are several other lakes nearby, including Guiphop Zei, Nrou Zei, and Nap-sam Zei.
- Buning Meadow (Npiulong) is located on the western side of Tamei town. A number of well-groomed, uneven small mounds, as well as numerous brooks, mark the stretch. In early summer ground orchids and Wild Lilies can be seen in the meadow. The meadow is also home to wild birds and foxes.
- Phelong Village a village inhabited by the Liangmai people is well known for its Orange production and its taste. Phelong has been one of the major producers of oranges in Tamenglong District.
- Taningjam Village also found in Liangmai land is one of the oldest villages of Tamenglong District. The rivers and Rock Garden are well-known attractions for a visit to the village.

== Economy ==
In 2006 the Ministry of Panchayati Raj named Tamenglong one of the country's 250 most backward districts (out of a total of 640). It is one of the three districts in Manipur currently receiving funds from the Backward Regions Grant Fund Programme (BRGF).

== Demographics ==
Historical population
Year	Pop.	±%
1951	33,519	—
1961	37,667	+12.4%
1971	46,034	+22.2%
1981	62,289	+35.3%
1991	86,278	+38.5%
2001	111,499	+29.2%
2011	140,651	+26.1%
2011 Tamenglong district (includes the present Noney district); Source: Census of India

Religions in Tamenglong district (2011)
Christianity	95.81%
Hinduism	2.13%
Others	2.11%

According to the 2011 census Tamenglong district has a population of 140,651. This gives it a ranking of 607th in India (out of a total of 640). The district has a population density of 32 inhabitants per square kilometre (83/sq mi). Its population growth rate over the decade 2001–2011 was 25.69%. Tamenglong has a sex ratio of 953 females for every 1000 males, and a literacy rate of 70.4%.

=== Language ===
Majority of the population of the district speaks Rongmei with a large Liangmai and Zeme speakers. There are also some Thadou, Hindi, Chiru and Gangte speakers as per 2011 census in the erstwhile undivided district (including Noney district).

== Administrative divisions ==
The district is divided into three sub-divisions:

- Tamenglong
- Tamei
- Tousem

In December 2016, the Nungba subdivision was separated out as the new Noney district.Some parts of Nungba subdivision was carved to form the new Jiribam district

== Gallery ==
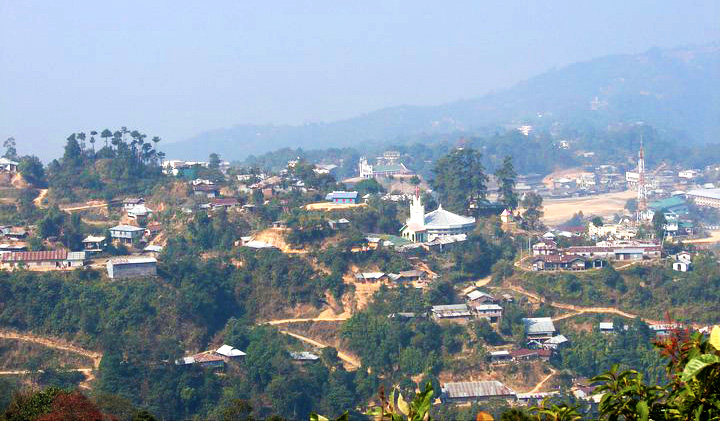
View of town as seen from Gaidai foothill

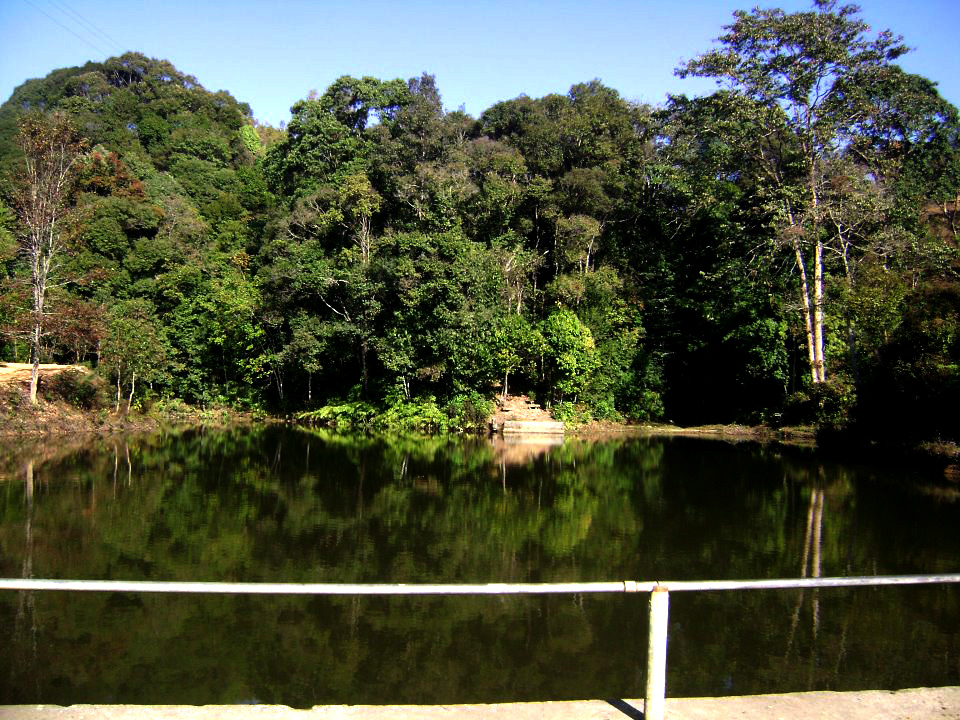
Farmland Lake.

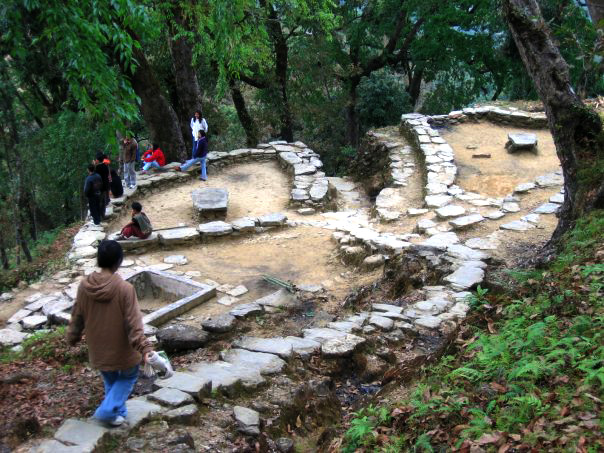
Raengon Bamduan

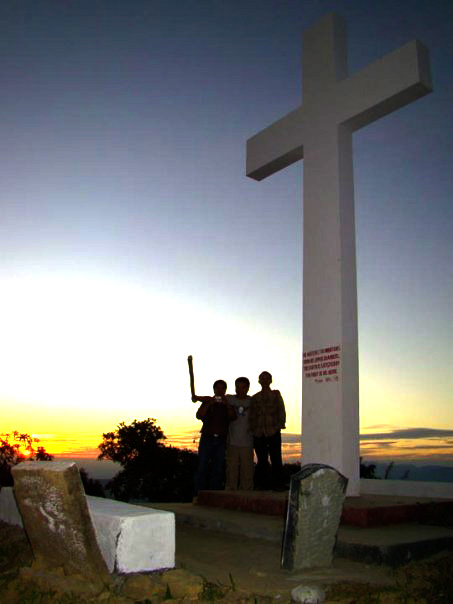
Prayer Mountain

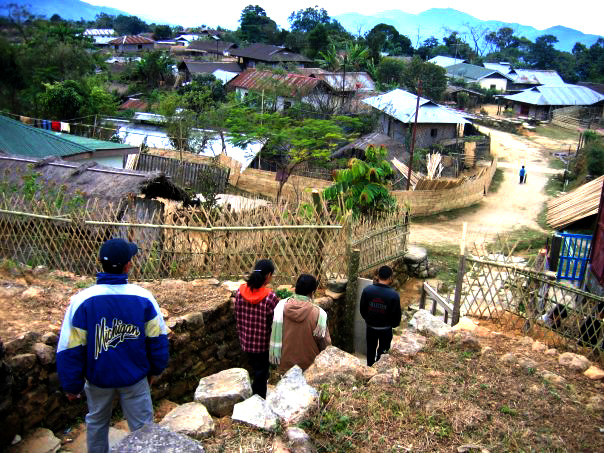
Nriangluang

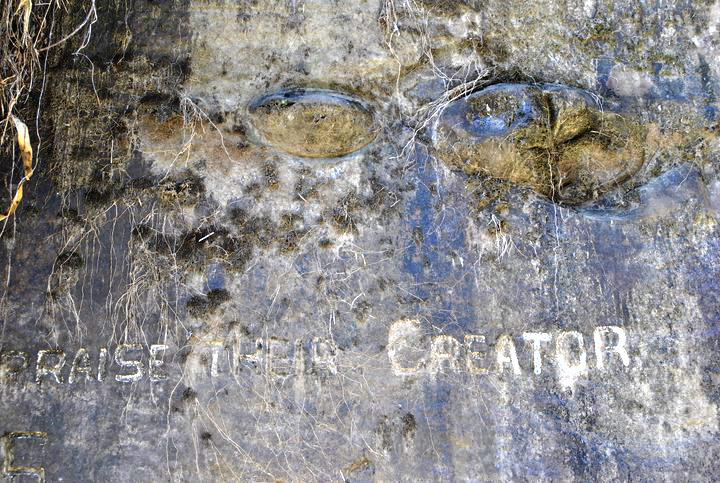
Rah Nouh Bung (Ghost Breasts) at Barak

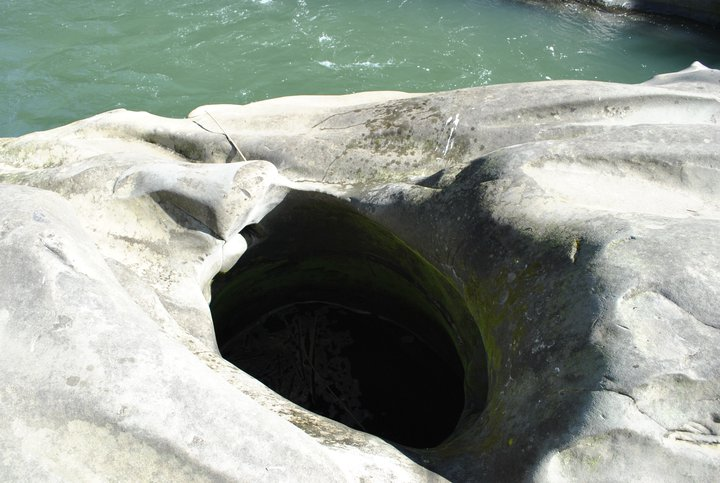
Asha Naaploih (Asha Rice Pot) at Barak

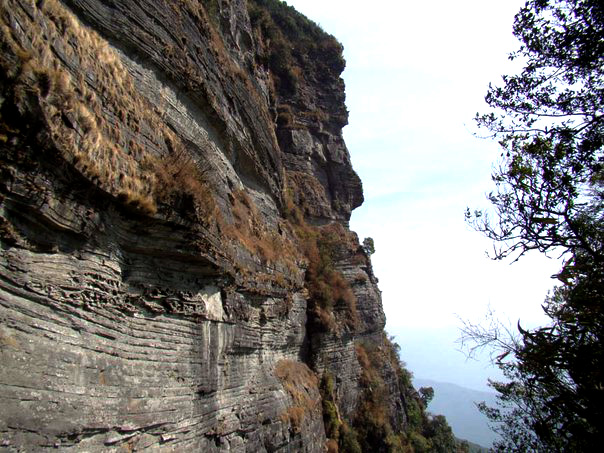
The famous Kacha Khou (Mountain) at Magulong

== Notable Personalities ==
- Rani Gaidinliu
- Haipou Jaodonang
- Armstrong Pame

== See also ==
- List of populated places in Tamenglong district
