= New Nkio =

- village
- Location in Nagaland, India New Nkio (India)
- Coordinates: 25.413178°N 93.471888°E
- Country: India
- State: Nagaland
- District: Peren
- Circle: Kebai Khelma

Population (2011)
  - Total: 355
- Time zone: UTC+5:30 (IST)
- Census code: 268360

Nkio (New) is a village in the Peren district of Nagaland, India. It is located in the Kebai Khelma Circle.

== Demographics ==
According to the 2011 census of India, Nkio (New) has 64 households. The effective literacy rate (i.e. the literacy rate of population excluding children aged 6 and below) is 34.2%.

Demographics (2011 Census)
	Total	Male	Female
Population	355	172	183
Children aged below 6 years	86	40	46
Scheduled caste	0	0	0
Scheduled tribe	345	165	180
Literates	92	61	31
Workers (all)	237	118	119
Main workers (total)	215	106	109
Main workers: Cultivators	215	106	109
Main workers: Agricultural labourers	0	0	0
Main workers: Household industry workers	0	0	0
Main workers: Other	0	0	0
Marginal workers (total)	22	12	10
Marginal workers: Cultivators	17	8	9
Marginal workers: Agricultural labourers	0	0	0
Marginal workers: Household industry workers	2	1	1
Marginal workers: Others	3	3	0
Non-workers	118	54	64
