= Liangmai language =

Sino-Tibetan language

- Kwoireng
- Lianglad
- Native to: India
- Region: Manipur, Nagaland
- Ethnicity: Liangmai Naga
- Native speakers: 49,800 (2011)
- Language family: Sino-Tibetan: Tibeto-Burman; Central Tibeto-Burman languages (?); Kuki-Chin-Naga; Zemeic; Liangmai language
- Writing system: Latin

Language codes
- ISO 639-3: njn
- Glottolog: lian1251
- ELP: Liangmai Naga

Liangmai language or Lianglad is one of the Naga languages spoken by the Liangmai Naga in Nagaland and Manipur. It is close to the other nearby languages: Maram, Poumai, Thangal (Khoirao), Rongmei, and Zeme. Together with the Zeme and Rongmei, the three are collectively known as the Zeliangrong. Liangmai has also been known as Kwoireng. Amongst the Zeliangrong, Liangmai has been called chara lad /tsəra lat/, the "language of god." Zeliangrong folklore says that all three descended from a common ancestor and that their original language was closest to Liangmai. This story is supported by the rituals, songs, and chants of the non-Christian Rongmei who used a language that is similar to Liangmai. Since their conversion to Christianity, this language is spoken only by Liangmai natives and Heraka worshippers.

== Distribution ==
In Manipur, Liangmai speakers are 1.5% of the population and is spoken mainly in Tamenglong, the Tamei and Tousem subdistricts of the Tamenglong district, the Senapati district, the Kangpokpi district and Kanglatongbi town in Imphal West. In Nagaland, speakers can be found in Kohima, Dimapur, and in the Jalukie and Tening subdistricts of Peren. In 2011, the census of India recorded 49,811 speakers of Liangmai. Most speakers are multilingual, able to speak in Meitei, Hindi, English, Nagamese or other Naga languages. UNESCO and the Endangered Language Project consider the language vulnerable with Liangmai largely confined to homelife though it is passed on intergenerationally.
