= Tamenglong =

- Town
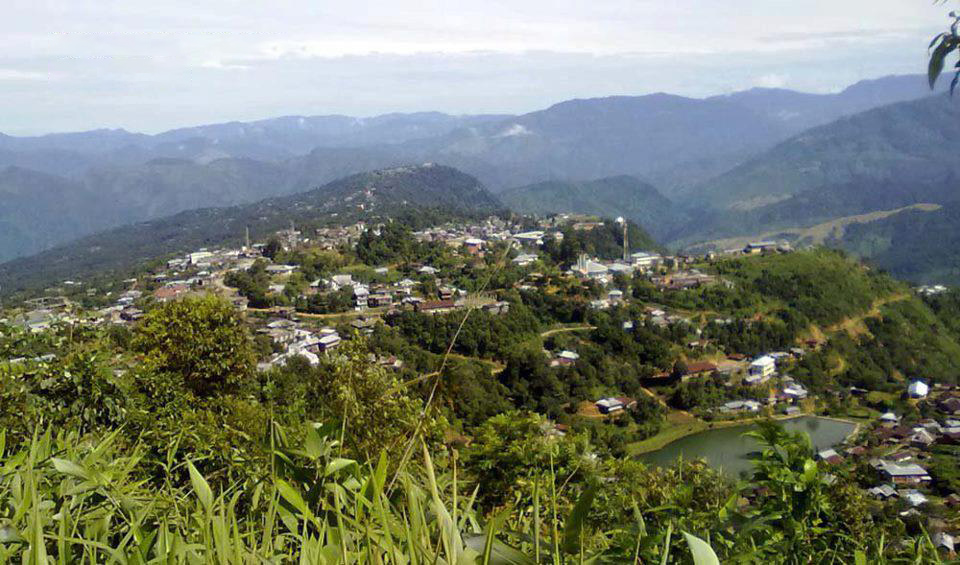

- Location in Manipur, India Tamenglong (India)
- Coordinates: 24.99°N 93.5°E
- Country: India
- State: Manipur
- District: Tamenglong district
- Elevation: 1,580 m (5,180 ft)

Population (2011)
  - Total: 19,363

Language(s)
  - Official: Zeme, Liangmai, Rongmei (Note: Zeme, Liangmai, Rongmei (officially known as the Zeliangrong languages) is the official language of Nagalim. Other regional languages of different places in Nagalim may either be predominantly spoken or not in their respective places but Lianglad, Zeme and Ruanglat is always officially used.)
- Time zone: UTC+5:30 (IST)
- PIN: 795141
- Telephone code: 03877
- Vehicle registration: MN
- Literacy: 86.93%
- Website: Official website

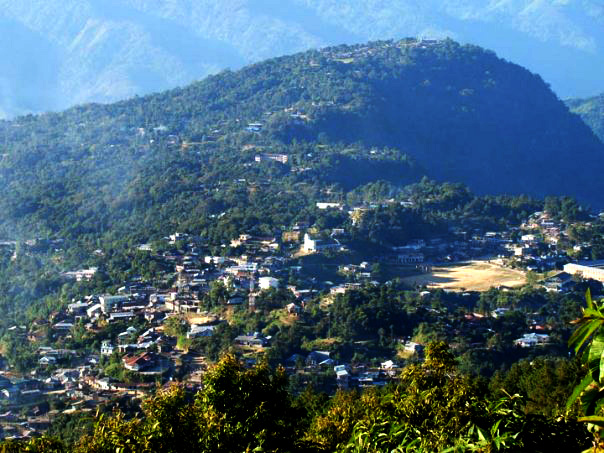
View of the town from Gadaibut

Tamenglong (Meitei pronunciation:/tæmɛŋˈlɒŋ/ (Note: Meitei language (officially known as Manipuri language) is the official language of Manipur. Other regional languages of different places in Manipur may either be predominantly spoken or not in their respective places but "Meitei" is always officially used.)) is a town in the Naga hills of Manipur and the district headquarter of the Tamenglong district.

== Geography ==
Tamenglong is located in western Manipur lying on the hilltop from which descends the Barak River. It is 160 km west of Imphal, Manipur's capital city.

== Climate ==
Köppen-Geiger climate classification system classifies its climate as humid subtropical (Cwa). Tamenglong is a highland which makes the temperatures cooler. The warmer months are extremely rainy. July receives most rain while December is the driest.

Climate data for Tamenglong
Month	Jan	Feb	Mar	Apr	May	Jun	Jul	Aug	Sep	Oct	Nov	Dec	Year
Mean daily maximum °C (°F)	18.6 (65.5)	20 (68)	23.8 (74.8)	25.8 (78.4)	25.9 (78.6)	25.5 (77.9)	25.4 (77.7)	25.5 (77.9)	25.1 (77.2)	24.2 (75.6)	23.6 (74.5)	19.2 (66.6)	23.5 (74.4)
Daily mean °C (°F)	12.2 (54.0)	13.8 (56.8)	17.5 (63.5)	20.1 (68.2)	21.2 (70.2)	21.9 (71.4)	22.1 (71.8)	22.2 (72.0)	21.6 (70.9)	19.9 (67.8)	16.2 (61.2)	13.1 (55.6)	18.5 (65.3)
Mean daily minimum °C (°F)	5.9 (42.6)	7.7 (45.9)	11.2 (52.2)	14.4 (57.9)	16.5 (61.7)	18.4 (65.1)	18.9 (66.0)	18.9 (66.0)	18.1 (64.6)	15.7 (60.3)	10.9 (51.6)	7.1 (44.8)	13.6 (56.6)
Average precipitation mm (inches)	34 (1.3)	46 (1.8)	168 (6.6)	223 (8.8)	324 (12.8)	688 (27.1)	728 (28.7)	535 (21.1)	323 (12.7)	217 (8.5)	42 (1.7)	8 (0.3)	3,336 (131.4)
Source: Climate-Data.org (altitude: 1266m)
