= Rongmei language =

Sino-Tibetan language spoken in India

Ruanglat
- Songbu
- Ruanglat, "Ruangmei"
- Region: Assam, Manipur and Nagaland
- Ethnicity: Rongmei Naga
- Native speakers: (undated figure of 230,000)
- Language family: Sino-Tibetan: Tibeto-Burman; Central Tibeto-Burman (?); Kuki-Chin-Naga; Zemeic; Ruanglat

Language codes
- ISO 639-3: nbu
- Glottolog: rong1266
- ELP: Rongmei Naga

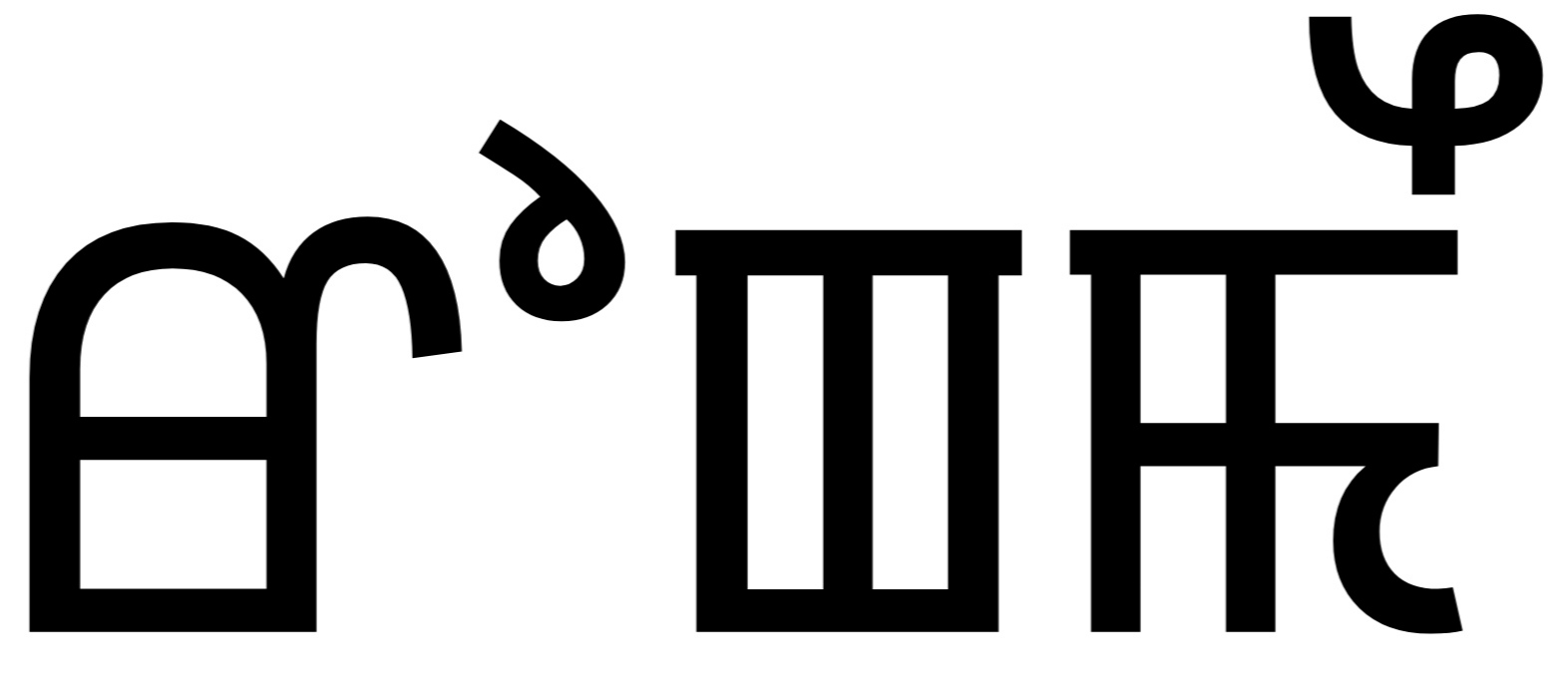
The word "Rongmei" written in the Meitei script

Rongmei (also Ruangmei) natively known as Ruanglat is a Sino-Tibetan language spoken by the Rongmei Naga community in Northeast India. It has been called Songbu and is close to Zeme, Liangmai and Inpui. The language has been nomenclatured as "Ruangmei" and studied as a First Language paper from class I to X of Board of Secondary Education, Manipur. Ruangmei is studied as a Minor Indian Language (MIL) in Class XI & XII of Council of Higher Secondary Education Manipur (COHSEM).

== Geography ==
Rongmei is mostly spoken in the three states of Assam, Manipur and Nagaland.

It is the most spoken language in Tamenglong district and Noney district; and the second most spoken language in Imphal West district and Bishnupur district of Manipur.

== Phonology ==
=== Consonants ===
		Labial	Alveolar	Palatal	Velar	Glottal
Plosive/ Affricate	voiceless	p	t	tʃ	k	
Plosive/ Affricate	aspirated	pʰ	tʰ		kʰ	
Plosive/ Affricate	voiced	b	d	dʒ	ɡ	
Nasal		m	n		ŋ	
Fricative			s			h
Trill			r			
Approximant	lateral		l			
Approximant	central	w		j		

=== Vowels ===
	Front	Central	Back
Close	i		u
Mid	e	ə	o
Open		a	

A lower-mid elongated sound [ɐː] also occurs only in word-medial positions.
