= Zeme language =

Sino-Tibetan language of Northeast India

Zeme
- Zeliang
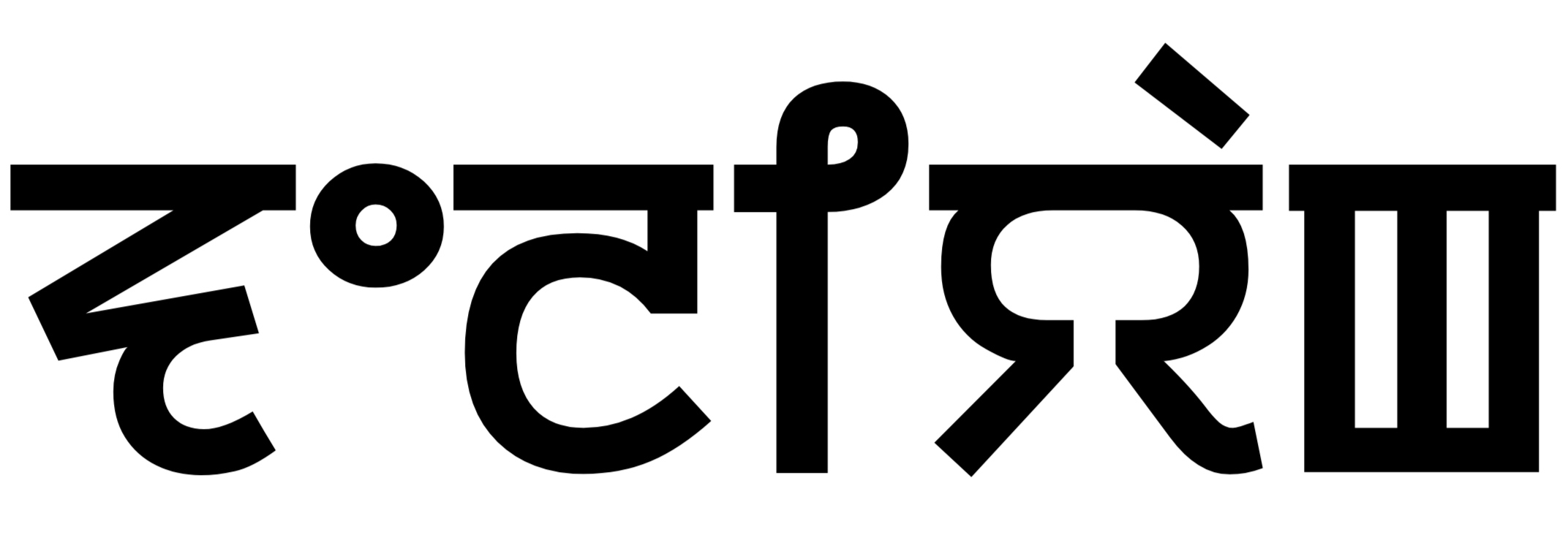
- "Zeliang" written in Meitei script
- Native to: India
- Region: Assam, Manipur, Nagaland
- Ethnicity: Zeme Naga
- Native speakers: 110,000 (2011 census)
- Language family: Sino-Tibetan: Tibeto-Burman; Central Tibeto-Burman languages (?); Kuki-Chin-Naga; Zemeic; Zeme

Language codes
- ISO 639-3: nzm
- Glottolog: zeme1240
- ELP: Zeme Naga

Zeme (also called Empeo and Zemi) is a Sino-Tibetan language spoken in northeastern India. It is one of the dialects spoken by the Zeme Naga, the other being Mzieme.

== Geography and demography ==
Zeme (dialects: Paren, Njauna) is spoken in:

- North Cachar hills district, Assam
- Tamenglong district, Manipur
- Peren district, Nagaland

Most Zeme speakers are bi- or multi-lingual in the regional lingua franca of Manipuri and English.

=== Classification ===
Zeme belongs to the Kuki-Chin-Naga section of the Kamarupa group of the Baric sub-division of Tibeto-Burman language family. It is closely related to the neighboring languages of Liangmai and Rongmei.

== Phonology ==
=== Consonants ===
Consonants
		Labial	Alveolar	Palatal	Velar	Glottal
Nasal		m	n		ŋ	
Plosive/ Affricate	aspirated	pʰ	tʰ		kʰ	
Plosive/ Affricate	voiceless	p	t	tʃ	k	
Plosive/ Affricate	voiced	b	d		ɡ	
Fricative	voiceless		s			h
Fricative	voiced		z			
Trill			r			
Approximant	lateral		l			
Approximant	median	w		j		

=== Vowels ===
Monophthongs
	Front	Central	Back
Close	i		u
Mid	e	ə	o
Open		a	

Zeme also has six diphthongs: /ai, ao, oi, əu, ui, əi/.

Like other Tibeto-Burman languages, Zeme is a tonal language. Most of the words in the language are monosyllabic in nature.

== Grammar ==
Gender and number are not marked on Zeme verbs. The basic word order is SOV, with an alternate order of OSV, making it a verb-final language.

There are 7 categories of numerals in the language: cardinals, ordinals, fractionals, multiplicatives, distributives, restrictives, and approximates. The following are cardinal numerals:

Cardinal numbers
Value	Gloss	Num
1	one	ə-ket
2	two	ke-na
3	three	kə-čum
4	four	mə-dai
5	five	mə-ŋəiyu
6	six	sə-rok
7	seven	sə-na
8	eight	tə-set
9	nine	sə-kui
10	ten	kə-rəiyu
20	twenty	iŋkai
30	thirty	him-rəiyu
40	forty	he-dai
50	fifty	riŋ-ŋəiyu
60	sixty	riyak-sərok
70	seventy	riyak-səna
80	eighty	riyak-təset
90	ninety	riyak-səkui
100	one hundred	hai
1000	one thousand	čəŋ

Compound numerals are formed by adding two numerals together, with the bigger numeral, usually a multiple of 10, preceding the smaller one. The decade numerals from 40, 50, 60, 70, 80, and 90 are formed by multiplication of decade by basic numerals by 10. The numeral 'ten' in Zeme has four allomorphs: kərəiyu, he, riŋ and riyak.
