= Nsong HQ =

- village
- Location in Nagaland, India Nsong HQ (India)
- Coordinates: 25.280477°N 93.548648°E
- Country: India
- State: Nagaland
- District: Peren
- Circle: Nsong

Population (2011)
  - Total: 532
- Time zone: UTC+5:30 (IST)
- Census code: 268365

Nsong Hq is a village in the Peren district of Nagaland, India. It is located in the Nsong Circle.

== Demographics ==
According to the 2011 census of India, Nsong Hq has 108 households. The effective literacy rate (i.e. the literacy rate of population excluding children aged 6 and below) is 87.17%.

Demographics (2011 Census)
	Total	Male	Female
Population	532	270	262
Children aged below 6 years	111	56	55
Scheduled caste	0	0	0
Scheduled tribe	523	265	258
Literates	367	187	180
Workers (all)	363	184	179
Main workers (total)	220	115	105
Main workers: Cultivators	163	73	90
Main workers: Agricultural labourers	5	3	2
Main workers: Household industry workers	0	0	0
Main workers: Other	52	39	13
Marginal workers (total)	143	69	74
Marginal workers: Cultivators	139	67	72
Marginal workers: Agricultural labourers	2	1	1
Marginal workers: Household industry workers	0	0	0
Marginal workers: Others	2	1	1
Non-workers	169	86	83
