= Tening HQ =

- village
- Location in Nagaland, India Tening HQ (India)
- Coordinates: 25.30°N 93.60°E
- Country: India
- State: Nagaland
- District: Peren
- Circle: Tening

Population (2011)
  - Total: 2,525

Languages
  - Official: Lianglad
- Time zone: UTC+5:30 (IST)
- Census code: 268383

Tening HQ is a village in the Peren district of Nagaland, India. It is the headquarters of the Tening Circle.

== Demographics ==
According to the 2011 census of India, Tening HQ has 448 households. The effective literacy rate (i.e. the literacy rate of population excluding children aged 6 and below) is 78.37%. Majority of the people of Tening speak Lianglad with a few Zeme and Rongmei speakers.

Demographics (2011 Census)
	Total	Male	Female
Population	2525	1320	1205
Children aged below 6 years	264	153	111
Scheduled caste	0	0	0
Scheduled tribe	2472	1286	1186
Literates	1772	957	815
Workers (all)	1397	723	674
Main workers (total)	933	489	444
Main workers: Cultivators	499	221	278
Main workers: Agricultural labourers	135	76	59
Main workers: Household industry workers	5	3	2
Main workers: Other	294	189	105
Marginal workers (total)	464	234	230
Marginal workers: Cultivators	107	59	48
Marginal workers: Agricultural labourers	247	123	124
Marginal workers: Household industry workers	65	33	32
Marginal workers: Others	45	19	26
Non-workers	1128	597	531
