= Ahthibung =

- Town
- Location Nagaland, India Ahthibung (India)
- Coordinates: 25.493941°N 93.609154°E
- Country: India
- State: Nagaland
- District: Peren District
- Circle: Ahthibung

Population (2011)
  - Total: 2,075

Language(s)
  - Official: Zeme
- Time zone: UTC+5:30 (IST)
- Census code: 268343

Ahthibung is a town in the Peren District of the Indian state of Nagaland. It is located in the Ahthibung Circle.

== Demographics ==
According to the 2011 census of India, Ahthibung has 438 households. The effective literacy rate (i.e. the literacy rate of population excluding children aged 6 and below) is 94.66%.

Demographics (2011 Census)
	Total	Male	Female
Population	2075	1030	1045
Children aged below 6 years	353	184	169
Scheduled caste	0	0	0
Scheduled tribe	2013	992	1021
Literates	1630	812	818
Workers (all)	1432	705	727
Main workers (total)	464	302	162
Main workers: Cultivators	306	202	104
Main workers: Agricultural labourers	7	3	4
Main workers: Household industry workers	17	9	8
Main workers: Other	134	88	46
Marginal workers (total)	968	403	565
Marginal workers: Cultivators	660	267	393
Marginal workers: Agricultural labourers	10	3	7
Marginal workers: Household industry workers	164	64	100
Marginal workers: Others	134	69	65
Non-workers	643	325	318
