= Peren district =

- District of Nagaland
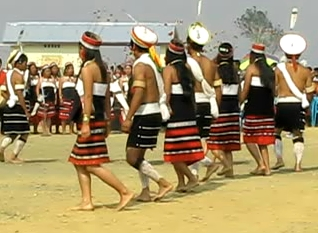
- A Liangmai dance in Peren
- Nickname: Green District
- Peren District's location in Nagaland
- Interactive map of Peren district
- Coordinates: 25.540°N 93.735°E
- Country: India
- State: Nagaland
- Seat: Peren

Government
  - Assembly constituencies: 2 constituencies

Area
  - Total: 2,300 km^{2} (890 sq mi)
- Elevation: 1,445 m (4,741 ft)

Population (2011)
  - Total: 95,219
  - Density: 41/km^{2} (110/sq mi)
- Time zone: UTC+05:30 (IST)
- ISO 3166 code: IN-NL-PE
- Major highways: NH 129A
- Website: http://peren-district.nic.in/

Peren district is a district of Nagaland, India. With headquarters the town of Peren, the district was formed by the partition of Kohima District in 2003.

== History ==
The Peren district was originally a sub-division of the Kohima district. It was declared a separate district on 24 October 2003.

== Administration ==
Peren district is divided into 3 subdivisions and 7 blocks.

Subdivisions

- Jalukie subdivision
- Peren subdivision
- Tening subdivision

Circle Blocks

1. Jalukie
2. Ngwalwa
3. Athibung
4. Peren
5. Tening
6. Kebai-Khelma
7. Nsong

== Demographics ==
According to the 2011 census, Peren district has a population of 95,219, roughly equal to the nation of Seychelles. This gives it a ranking of 616th in India (out of a total of 640). Peren has a sex ratio of 917 females for every 1000 males, and a literacy rate of 79%.

=== Religion ===
Religions in Peren district (2011)
Religion	Percent
Christianity	90.47%
Hinduism	4.28%
Tribal religion	2.62%
Islam	1.94%
Buddhism	0.48%
Other or not stated	0.21%
Distribution of religions

According to the 2011 official census, Christianity is major religion in Peren District with 86.145 Christians (90.47%), 4.076 Hindus (4.28%), 2.493 Animists (2.62%), 1.850 Muslims (1.94%), 459 Buddhists (0.48%), 15 Sikhs (0.02%), 10 Jains (0.01%) and 171 did not answer (0.18%).

=== Languages ===
At the time of the 2011 census, 57.20% of the population spoke Zeme, 11.37% Rongmei, 10.15% Lianglad, 3.95% Kuki, 3.84% Mzieme, 2.54% Nepali, 1.94% Bengali, 1.67% Chakeshang and 1.08% Ao as their first language.

1. Zeme (57.2%)
2. Rongmei (11.4%)
3. Lianglad (10.2%)
4. Kuki (3.95%)
5. Mzieme (3.84%)
6. Nepali (2.54%)
7. Bengali (1.94%)
8. Chakhesang (1.67%)
9. Ao (1.08%)

== Flora and fauna ==
In Peren district is the home to Ntangki National Park, which has an area of 202 km^{2} (78.0 mi^{2}).
