= Naga nationalism =

Ideology asserting that the Naga are a distinct nation

Flag of Nagaland adopted by the NNC in 1956.

Naga nationalism is an ideology that supports the self-determination of the Naga people in India (mainly in Nagaland and neighbouring regions) and Myanmar, and the furtherance of Naga culture.

== Formation of the nationalist identity ==
Menhir at Makhel commemorating the parting of ways of the ancestors of the Nagas

Some Naga groups share a common belief of their ethnogenesis as a distinct people: these groups include Zeme, Liangmai, Rongmai Pochury, Angami, Sema, Rengma, Lotha, Ememai, Poumai, Maramai, Thangalmai, Inpuiruan, Chakhesang, and Tangkhul. According to this belief, the ancestors of the Nagas lived in harmony together at a place called Mahkel (identified with the present-day Mao village of Makhel in Manipur, and, alternatively, believed to be near the Chindwin river in present-day Myanmar). As their population grew, they decided to split and spread outside Makhel. According to the Heraka faith, the Naga peoples took an oath pledging that they would come together again and live as a kingdom.

However, when the British arrived in India, the various Naga ethnic groups had no common national identity. The term "Naga" was a vaguely defined exonym, which referred to the different ethnic groups in present-day Nagaland and its surrounding area. The different ethnic groups spoke mutually unintelligible languages and had distinct cultures but they are inextricably interrelated. Each Naga village was a sovereign state ruled by ethnic elders.

Internecine feuds, wars and headhunting campaigns were common among the Naga ethnic groups. The British captured several Naga territories and consolidated them under the Naga Hills District of Assam. During the British rule, missionaries such as Miles Bronson and Edwin W. Clark introduced Christianity to the area, greatly changing the social and political fabric of the local society. The common Christian identity led to peace and unity among the various Naga ethnic groups. Nagamese developed as a link language for inter-ethnic communication.

== Naga Club ==
During the Kuki revolt (1917–19) and the World War I (1914–18), the British Government recruited a number of labourers and porters from the Naga ethnic groups. As part of the labour corps, around 2000 Nagas were sent to France, where, alienated from the other British–Indian troops, they developed a sense of unity. They agreed that after returning to their homeland, they will work towards unity and friendship among the various Naga ethnic groups. These Nagas, together with the British officials, formed the Naga Club in 1918. It was led by Dobashis, Gaonburas, Teachers, government servants, pastors and educated people in addition to the Naga Labour Corps personnel. It had two branches, one at Kohima and the other at Mokokchung.

This club provided the socio-political foundation for the Naga nationalist movement. In 1929, the Club submitted a memorandum to the Simon Commission, requesting that the Nagas should be given a choice of self-determination after the British departure from India.

== Heraka movement ==
Heraka was a religious movement led by Haipou Jadonang and his successor Rani Gaidinliu, who sought to establish the legendary kingdom of the Naga people during 1929-33. The two aimed at creating a feeling of religious nationalism among the Nagas, mainly the Zeliangrongs (Zeme, Liangmei and Rongmei including Inpui-Kabui). They launched an independence struggle against the British, and sought to establish inter-ethnic solidarity and unity. However, the movement was not widespread outside of the three Zeliangrong community due to its antagonistic attitude towards Christian converts and the Kukis. The movement also developed into a political uprising against the British, which prompted the Government to clamp down on it.

== Naga National Council ==
In 1945, C. R. Pawsey, the deputy commissioner of the Naga Hills District, established the Naga Hills District Tribal Council as a forum of the various Naga groups. This body replaced the Naga Club, and a year later, developed into a political organization called the Naga National Council (NNC). The NNC initially demanded autonomy within the Indian Union and a separate electorate. Naga nationalism began to emerge as a secessionist movement under the leadership of Angami Zapu Phizo of the Naga National Council.

NNC came under the leadership of Angami Zapu Phizo. It adopted a secessionist outlook and campaigned for the creation for a sovereign Naga state. The NNC declined as differences developed between Phizo and other leaders, and Phizo got the NNC secretary T. Sakhrie murdered in January 1956.

== National Socialist Council of Nagaland ==
More radical splinter groups have emerged from the Naga National Council like the National Socialist Council of Nagaland (NSCN). The NSCN described the struggle against India, not just in terms of ethnic conflict, but as part of a larger class struggle. The NSCN had Maoist influences and pushed for a continued armed conflict to resolve the contradiction between the larger state of India imposing its will on the Naga people. Although it was a Maoist organization, they still claimed Christianity as the state religion for their proposed Naga State. This is a great example of how powerful of a symbol Christianity had become amongst the Naga people. It did not seem to be a contradiction to support the atheist doctrines of Mao along with Christianity to the NSCN, who saw deep socialist principles in Jesus’ anti-institutional teachings on the poor and egalitarianism.

The National Socialist Council of Nagaland remained separate from the Naga National Council, and separate ceasefire agreements had to be negotiated with each group individually in the 90s. In 2015, Prime Minister Narendra Modi agreed to a peace deal with the insurgents that were previously active in Nagaland.

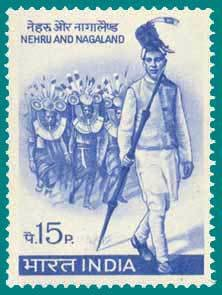
India Post stamp released on the fourth anniversary of Nagaland's statehood in 1967.

== Formation of Nagaland ==
After a series of armed conflicts and peace missions, the Government of India agreed to create the Naga Hills Tuensang Area (NHTA), a Union territory with a large degree of autonomy. After further protests, violence and diplomatic discussions, the Government recognised Nagaland as a full-fledged State within the Union of India. Since then, the Naga nationalism has co-existed with Indian nationalism. Nagaland recorded more than 87% voter turnout in 2014 Indian general election which was highest voters turnout in India which Indian authorities consider as faith of Naga people in democracy of India.

== See also ==
- Ethnic conflict in Nagaland
- Natwar Thakkar
- Tripuri nationalism
- Separatist movements of India
