= Tingkao Ragwang =

- Almighty and creator god
- Other names: Tingwang, Ragwang, Samtingphenpu, Buhshinmeipu-Buhdameipu
- Affiliation: Zeliangrong
- Abode: Tingkao Kaidai
- Festivals: Gaan-Ngai

Tingkao Ragwang or Tingwang is a god of the Zeliangrong people (indigenous Zeme, Liangmei and Rongmei tribes) of Assam, Manipur and Nagaland states in North Eastern India. He is considered as the almighty god who created the universe including the sun, moon and the earth, after which life began. Heraka and Tingkao Ragwang Chapriak are the two traditional religions based on the fundamental belief of Tingkao Ragwang, followed by the Zeliangrong people. The annual Gaan-Ngai festival is dedicated to Tingwang.

== Etymology ==
Tingkao Ragwang means the "Heavenly God" or "God of the sky" in the Zemeic languages. He is also known as Buhshinmeipu-Buhdameipu, the giver and protector of the soul. He is also called as Samtingphenpu meaning one sporting a long hair.

== Theology and historical development ==
According to traditional beliefs, Tingwang is the eternal god with no beginning or end, no father or mother and he is the source of all life and good. He is the architect of every life, source of knowledge and wisdom and nothing can be created without his will. He is beyond believed to be beyond time and space and described as omnipresent (present everywhere), omniscient (infinite knowledge), omnipotent (unlimited power) and omnibenevolent (perfect goodness). It is believed that he lives in the heaven above the sky called Tingkao Kaidai or Tingkao Ragwang kai with kai meaning "abode" in Zemic. According to the beliefs, Tingkao Ragwang created the universe, the sun, the moon, other celestial bodies and the natural elements of fire, water and earth.

Depending on the beliefs, Tingwang wanted to create human beings who could rule the world, make offerings and remember him. For the purpose, he created two deities named Dampapu and Dampapui to create the human beings. The two deities took a long time to create the first human beings, but the first man and woman were lifeless and could not move their limbs. Tingwang then gave Buh ("soul") and life began. According to the beliefs, every creature has a soul which cannot be seen but felt by placing the hands against the heart and when someone dies, the soul never dies. The ultimate goal of the human soul is to reach the abode of Tingwang.

== Worship ==
Heraka and Tingkao Ragwang Chapriak (TRC) are the two traditional religions based on the fundamental belief of Tingkao Ragwang, followed by the Zeliangrong people. The main difference between the religions is that Heraka is monotheistic, while Chapriak is polytheistic. In Zemic, Heraka literally means "pure" with Hera referring to smaller deities and Ka meaning "fence or obstruct". So all sacrifices associated with the smaller gods must be avoided and only Tingkao Ragwang must be worshiped. In contrast, followers of TRC offer rituals and sacrifice to the brother gods, Vishnu, Naptime, Karagong, Koloa, Chongchai, Charakilongmei and Dimei, with the primary worship of Tingwang.

Tingwang was worshiped in no specific form till the 20th century. Haipou Jadonang, a prophet, introduced reforms in the traditional worship, abolishing irrational practices and introduced the worship of Tingwang through prayer. He introduced worshiping Tingwang by putting the hands together, facing east and saying "Ragwang, Do what is good for us." He composed religious hymns, constructed a temple called Kao Kai and introduced idol worship similar to Hinduism. Heraka uses a symbol of earring. TRC uses crisscrossed lines within the circle representing the Zodiac with the sun and moon which are the creation of Tingwang.

== Festival ==
Gaan-Ngai is a festival is celebrated as to commemorate the coming of light or fire, given by Tingwang. It is a post harvest festival celebrated to thank Tingkao Ragwang for a good harvest season and heralds the beginning of a new year. The festival is celebrated for five days and involves congregational prayers and invocation to the almighty god Tingkao Ragwang. Tingkao Rangwang is offered the first taste of meals and drinks, prepared during the festival and also involves other festivities like music and dance.
