= Gaan-Ngai =

Festival in India

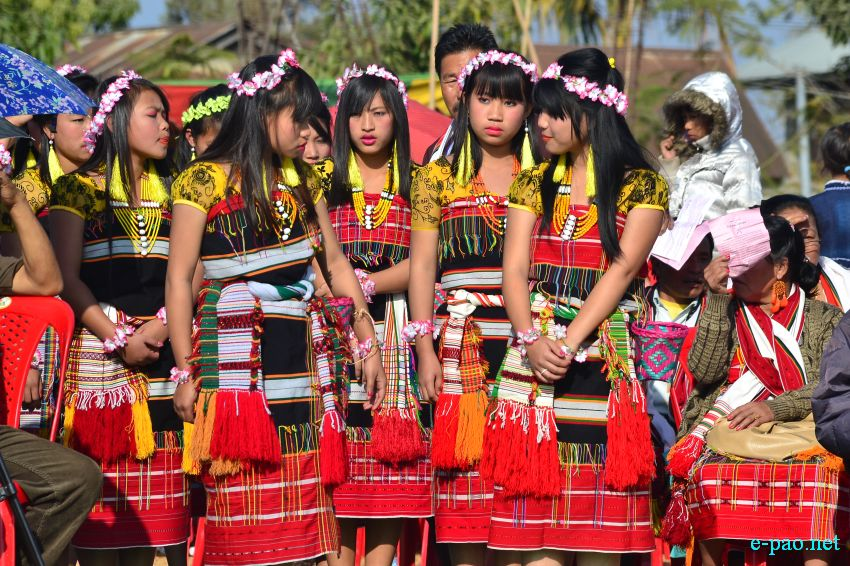
- Gaan-Ngai celebration
- Observed by: Kabui
- Significance: Post-Harvest festival
- Date: November–December
- Duration: Several days
- Frequency: Annual

Gaan-Ngai is a festival of the Rongmei of Assam, Manipur and Nagaland states in North Eastern India. Gaan-Ngai is a festival of light, celebrating the victory of light over evil and the commemoration of the coming of light or fire. It is a post harvest festival celebrated to thank the God Tingkao Ragwang for a good harvest season and heralds the beginning of a new year. The festival is celebrated for five days with various rituals, prayers and festivities such as music, dance and feast accompanying the same.

== Etymology ==
Gaan-Ngai translates to "winter festival" in Ruanglat with Gaan meaning "winter" or "dry season" and Ngai meaning festival.

== Background ==
According to legend and folklore, life began after the creation of the universe including earth by Tingkao Ragwang, the creator and almighty god. Gods and humans shared a common dormitory called khangchu in the house of Tingpu Rengsonnang, where they were not on friendly terms and men were often at the mercy of gods. Later, some of the men appeared in the physical form of khodiai (bee) and bit the gods, which led to the gods fleeing away.

Cooked rice on paddy plants was granted to be readily consumed as a food. There was abundance of rice, so that there was always surplus after consumption. While humans achieved peace initially, they multiplied as ages passed and the cooked rice was no more available post the fleeing of the gods. Thingpu Rengsonnang, the householder of the dormitory, visited the surroundings and found fertile soil, conducive for vegetation and proclaimed that the villagers should go for cultivation. As only raw rice could be obtained from paddy, they prayed to Tingkao Rangwang for help. After a long time of prayers, they saw smoke emanating from the ground, which was generated from a earthen pot in which a fire was burning. The fire was used to cook the raw rice and the humans were able to consume cooked rice again. The festival is celebrated as to commemorate the coming of light or fire.

== Occurrence ==
Gaan-Ngai is celebrated on the 13th day of the month of Wakching of the Metei Manipuri calendar. The Kabui Naga people celebrate the Gang Ngai festival during the month of Gaan Bu. It usually falls in the month of November or December in the Gregorian calendar though might some times be celebrated earlier in October or later in January.

== Observance ==
Gaan-Ngai is celebrated by the Zeliangrong people from Assam, Manipur and Nagaland states in North Eastern India in different forms. Zeliagrong is an acronym for the indigenous Zeme, Liangmai and Rongmei tribes, who follow the indigenous religions Tingkao Ragwang Chapriak ("the religion of the heavenly god") and Heraka ("pure"). The festival is also called as Hega Ngi by Zeme tribe and Chaga Ngee or Chaga Gadi by the Liangmai tribe. The festivities are coordinated by a common religious authority called Tingkao Ragwang Chapriak Phom, which was formed in 1994.

Gaan-Ngai is a festival of light, celebrating the victory of light over evil. It is a post harvest festival celebrated to thank the God Tingkao Ragwang for a good harvest season and heralds the beginning of a new year.

It was declared as a public holiday in Manipur from 1997, a restricted holiday in Assam and a holiday in October in Nagaland. It is celebrated in indigenous villages with significant population of Zeliangrong people.

== Practices ==
The festival is celebrated for five days. The festival involves congregational prayers and invocation to the almighty god Tingkao Ragwang. Tingkao Rangwang is offered the first taste of meals and drinks, prepared during the festival and the festival also involves sacrifice and rituals to the other gods and goddesses of the lower realm.

On the first day of the festival, Gucheng Phaimei ritual is conducted where pieces of ginger, believed to be the fingers of Tingkao Ragwang, are thrown at the ends of the village to ward off evil forces. Later, Gakpai Jaomei is performed by the members of Chinch and elders of the village where future predictions are made using a spleen of a pig offered to Tingkao Raglan for his blessing after which a feast called Jeigan Tumei is held. In the afternoon, post a ceremonial march called Hoi Gammei is held till the selected place for conducting sports and games. Various games and sports such as stone throwing and races are organized for the youth of the village on the opening day of the festival. The winners of the games are not given prizes but are required to pay Shon, a fees for acknowledging his power and ability.

In the evening, to mark the beginning of fire, a new fire is produced using wood such as bamboo or flints. During the festival, bachelors produce the fire known as Mairapmei in the dormitory and then go house to house, producing the fire and praying for health, peace and prosperity of the community. This practice of producing a bright fire, signifies the beginning of a peaceful and bright future. Following the same, in the event Napcha Tukaronmei, unmarried men (from the dormitory Chinch) and women (from the dormitory Loch) visit every house to enjoy the delicious food cooked under the new fire. As a part of Kaidapmei, persons chosen by the leaders go to each house to announce a punishment if they are found to be disturbing the festivities.

On the second day, the women perform Tamchan Jouchanmei, wherein meat, drinks and other food is distributed accompanied by dances (Tamchan lam) and songs (Tam Chanlu), performed by the girls. Tuna Gaan Lam is performed on the third day wherein a dance is performed in recognition of newly admitted members to the dormitories and to honor those who have been promoted to the higher ranks. It is also performed as a tribute to the dead known as Thei Kadimei. Napchanmei is performed wherein a pig is offered to Tingkao for blessings and cooked pork is distributed to every family. Tuna Gaan-Ngai is conducted on the fourth day of the festival with the unmarried jointly making a gathering and distribute pieces of meat, small packet of salt and chilli along with rice beer. The practice signifies the pronouncement of each member in the ceremony to meet in another world Taroilam after death and members make a commitment to safeguard his or her character concerning for the journey of soul to Taroilam. On the last day of the festival, ritual and sacrifice are performed to the eight brother gods, namely Raguang, Vishnu, Naptime, Karagong, Koloa, Chongchai Charakilongmei and Dimei, led by the eldest Pekoe.

The festival also honors those who died in previous year. Their graves are decorated with flowers with people dancing and offering a feast to the dead. As per traditional beliefs, souls after the separation from body live in Taroilam, presided over by god Taroigong and packets of food called Thei Napdom are buried along with the dead bodies for the journey. The soul of a person who had died after the preceding year's festival has not yet made to the final destination and homage to the departed souls are done by the individual families to enable the souls to reach the final destination.
