= Tingkao Ragwang Chapriak =

Zeliangrong religion

Tingkao Ragwang Chapriak (TRC) is the traditional religion followed by the Zeliangrong people (indigenous Zeme, Liangmei and Rongmei tribes) of Assam, Manipur and Nagaland states in North Eastern India. It is a polytheistic religion based on the fundamental belief of Tingkao Ragwang, the supreme god or almighty and other smaller Sylvan deities.

== Etymology ==
Tingkao Ragwang Chapriak means "the religion of the heavenly god" in Zemeic languages. Tingkao Ragwang means the "Heavenly God" or "God of the sky" and Chapriak means "religion".

== Gods and symbolism ==
Tingkao Ragwang Chapriak is a polytheistic religion. The primary god is the Tingkao Ragwang, the almighty and creator god. According to traditional beliefs, Tingwang is the eternal god with no beginning or end, no father or mother and he is the source of all life and good. He is the architect of every life, source of knowledge and wisdom and nothing can be created without his will. Tingkao Ragwang created the universe, the sun, the moon, other celestial bodies and the natural elements of fire, water and earth. The other gods in the pantheon include the brotherly gods of Bisnu, Naptime, Karangong, Koloa, Chongchai, Charakilongmei and Dimei.

Deities of the Zeliangrong Tribes
God	Alternate names	Abode
Tingkao Ragwang	Charagwang, Tingwang, Charahwang, Samthingphenmei, Buchameipu,	Tingkao Kaidai
Ragwang	Na Ragwang, Rahwang	Ragwang Phaipa, Koubru
Bisnu	Manchanu, Buichanu, Bonchanu	Bhubon Hill, Cachar
Napsinmei	Laorang, Naptime	Ganglon Namthan (Phoulungba)
Chongchai	Chonchai	Kashokbut, Taosang
Charakilongmei		Bena (Thongrang Akutpa)
Koklou	Koloa	Pongringlong
Karangong	Karagong	Puching (Kheba Ching), Tamenglong
Dimei	Banglahwang (in Lianglad)	Under the earth

Tingkao Ragwang Chapriak uses a symbol called Boudan made of crisscrossed lines representing the zodiac within a circle, representing the universe, with the sun and moon inside, all of which are the creation of Tingwang.

== Beliefs ==
Tingkao Ragwang is the eternal god with the ultimate source and power of the universe and is the prime subject of religious devotion. He is omnipotent, omnipresent, and omniscient. Tingwang is the creator, operator and destroyer and 'the king of the Gods' with no end or beginning. Depending on the beliefs, Tingwang wanted to create human beings who could rule the world, make offerings and remember him. For the purpose, he created two deities named Dampapu and Dampapui to create the human beings. The two deities took a long time to create the first human beings, but the first man and woman were lifeless and could not move their limbs. Tingwang then gave Buh ("soul") and life began. According to the beliefs, every creature has a soul which cannot be seen but felt by placing the hands against the heart and when someone dies, the soul never dies. The ultimate goal of the human soul is to reach the abode of Tingwang.

As per traditional beliefs, souls after the separation from body live in Taroilam, presided over by god Taroigong and packets of food called Thei Napdom are buried along with the dead bodies for the journey. The soul of a person who had died after the preceding year's festival has not yet made to the final destination and homage to the departed souls are done by the individual families to enable the souls to reach the final destination. Heaven is the dwelling place of God and symbolizes light and happiness. Tingkao Ragwang Chapriak people believe in the existence of heaven at Tingkao Kaidai, the abode of Tingkao Ragwang. Only if the soul is free from all feelings and if one has live a righteous life, then the soul will proceed to reach the realm of Tingwang.

== Practices ==
Gaan-Ngai is a festival of light, celebrating the victory of light over evil. It is a post harvest festival celebrated to thank the God Tingkao Ragwang for a good harvest season and heralds the beginning of a new year. The festival is celebrated for five days and involves congregational prayers and invocation to the almighty god Tingkao Ragwang. Tingkao Rangwang is offered the first taste of meals and drinks, prepared during the festival and the festival also involves sacrifice and rituals to the other gods and goddesses of the lower realm.
