= Ramkuiwangbe Jeme Newme =

Indian social worker

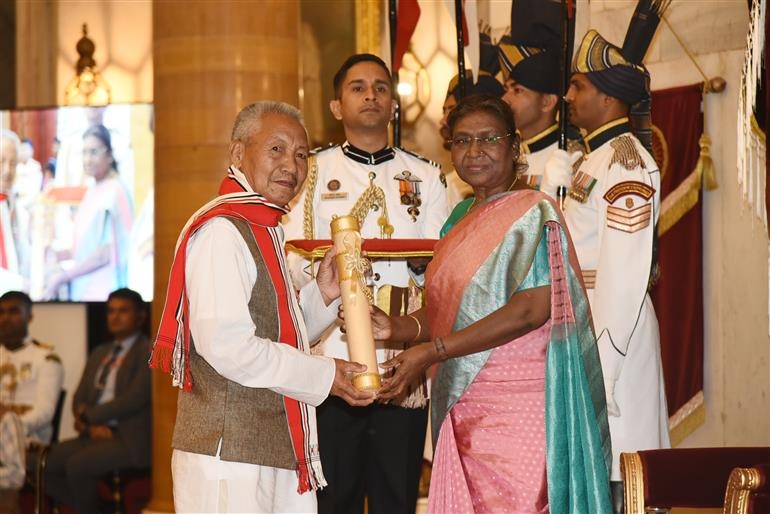
- The President, Smt. Droupadi Murmu presenting the Padma Shri Award to Dr. Ramkuiwangbe Jeme Newme at the Civil Investiture Ceremony-II at Rashtrapati Bhavan, in New Delhi on 5 April 2023
- Born: 25 May 1947 (age 79); Assam, India
- Known for: Social worker
- Awards: Padma Shri (2023)

Ramkuiwangbe Jeme Newme (born 25 May 1947) is an Indian social worker from Assam. He is a retired Elementary Education Officer from Dima Hasao district of Assam. The Government of India awarded him the Padma Shri in 2023 for his lifelong efforts to promote education, eradicate sacrifice and protect and preserve the Heraka movement of the Naga people.

== Life and work ==
Ramkuiwangbe Jeme Newme was born on 25 May 1947, at Boro Henam, 28 km from Haflong one of the oldest Jeme villages of Dima Hasao district, located in the state of Assam. His father Inchekambe Newme was a political leader. He did his schooling and High School from Government Boys' High School, Haflong and obtained his Bachelor of Arts degree from Shillong Government College in 1975. He appointed as the North Cachar Hills District Council's Sub-Inspector of Schools in Haflong in 1980 and retired as the District Primary Education Officer in 2011. He is a social worker who is known as the "Hero of Heraka" for preserving and promoting the Heraka faith and traditional culture of the Heraka people. He transcribed the Heraka religious text "Tingwang Hingde" and founded ten primary schools throughout his life He has also promoted women's education throughout his life. He worked as a personal assistant to liberation fighter Rani Gaidinliu.

In 1974, Newme was the founding General Secretary of the Zeliangrong Heraka Association in North East India. He is an active and dynamic leaders of the Heraka movement, a socio-religious movement established by Haipou Jadonang.

Newme was nominated as the Court member of Dibrugarh University, Assam. Presently, he is the president of Lodi High School Committee and of Rani Gaidinliu Memorial Junior College Committee, Haflong.

== Awards and honours ==
- 1997: Sri Guruji Samaj Prabadhan Puruskar by Jana Kalyan Samiti, Pune Bombay.
- 2010: Bhaorao Deoraj Smrity Samman for his selfless service in protecting Haraka custom and religion.
- 2015: Vivekananda Kendra Institute of Culture Samman.
- 2018: Doctor of Science (Honoris cousa) by NITTE University.
- 2023: Awarded the Padma Shri in New Delhi by a President of India, Droupadi Murmu in the field of Social works.
