= Kabui Naga language =

Kabui Naga may refer to:

- Inpui language or Inpui Naga language or Kabui, Sino-Tibetan language spoken by the Naga people in northeastern India
  - Inpui Nagas, or Inpui Naga, the speakers of this language
- Rongmei language or Rongmei Naga language or Kabui, Sino-Tibetan language spoken by the Naga people in northeastern India
  - Rongmei people, the speakers of this language

== See also ==
- Kabui people, Naga people of northeastern India
- Rongmei (disambiguation)
- Inpui Naga (disambiguation)
