= Rani Gaidinliu =

Indian freedom fighter (1915 – 1993)

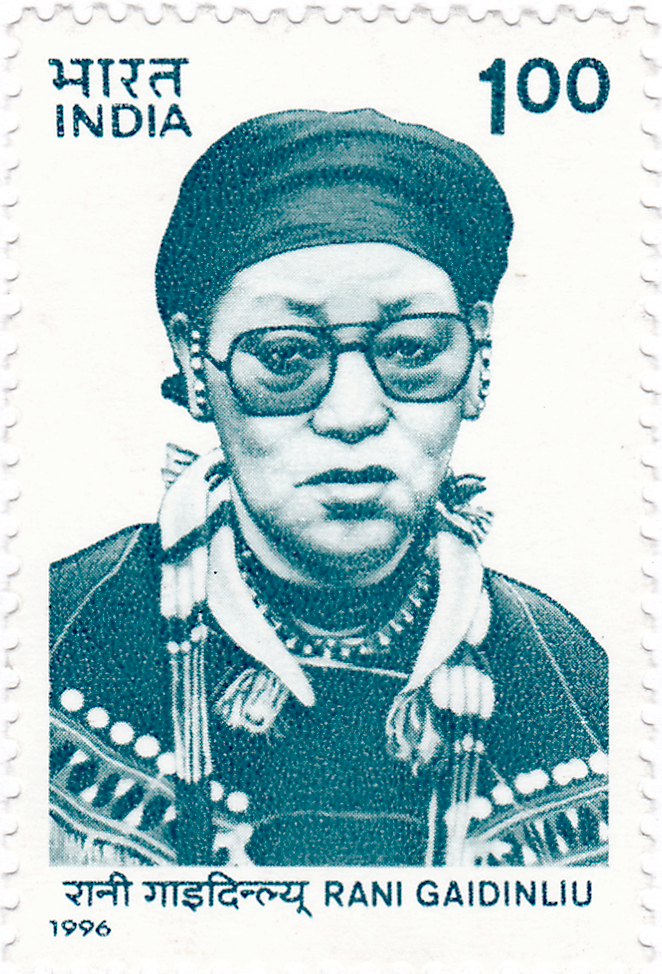
- Rani Gaidinliu on a 1996 stamp of India
- Born: Gaidinliu Pamei; 26 October 1915; Longkao village, Manipur, British India
- Died: 17 February 1993 (aged 78); Longkao, Manipur, India
- Occupations: Spiritual and political leader of the Zeliangrong Nagas
- Known for: Armed resistance against the British Raj
- Parents: Lothanang (father); Karotlienliu (mother)
- Awards: Padma Bhushan (1982), Tamrapatra Freedom Fighter Award (1972), Vivekananda Seva Award (1983)

Gaidinliu Pamei (26 January 1915 – 17 February 1993) popularly known as Rani Gaidinliu was an Indian Naga spiritual and political leader who led a revolt against British rule in India. At the age of 13, she joined the Heraka religious movement of her cousin Haipou Jadonang. The movement later turned into a political movement seeking to drive out the British from Manipur. Within the Heraka faith, she came to be considered an incarnation of the Goddess Cherachamdinliu. Gaidinliu was arrested in 1932 at the age of 16, and was sentenced to life imprisonment by the British rulers. Jawaharlal Nehru met her at Shillong Jail in 1937, and promised to pursue her release. Nehru gave her the title of "Rani" ("Queen"), and she gained local popularity as Rani Gaidinliu.

She was released in 1947 after India's independence, and continued to work for the upliftment of her people. An advocate of the ancestral religious practices, she staunchly resisted the conversion of her community to Christianity. She was honoured as a freedom fighter and was awarded a Padma Bhushan by the Government of India.

== Early life ==
Gaidinliu Pamei was born on 26 January 1915 at Nungkao (or Longkao) village in the present-day Tousem sub-division of Tamenglong District, Manipur to a Rongmei Naga family. She was the fifth of eight children, including six sisters and a younger brother, born to Lothonang Pamei and Kachaklenliu. The family belonged to the ruling clan of the village. She did not have a formal education due to the lack of schools in the area.

== As Haipou Jadonang's disciple ==
In 1927, when she was just 13, Gaidinliu joined the Heraka movement of her cousin Haipou Jadonang, who had emerged as a prominent local leader. Jadonang's movement was a revival of a tribal religion. It attracted a number of followers from the Zeliangrong tribes (the Zeme, Liangmai and Rongmei). Jadonang was convicted and hanged by the British for killing a few Manipur merchants. Persuaded by Jadonang's ideology and principles, Gaidinliu became his disciple and a part of the movement against the British. In three years, by the age of 16, she was also accused of creating communal unrest against Kukis and the British wanted to arrest her. So she mobilised people against the British and their rule, and was finally arrested by the British for her calamity against the Kukis.

== Rebellion and incarceration ==
The British arrested and killed Jadonang by hanging on 29 August 1931 in Imphal. He was charged for treason due to the death of four Meitei traders in Longkao over violation of a social taboo; Jadonang had no role in the killings. Gaidinliu, then, emerged as his spiritual and political heir.

She openly rebelled against the British raj, exhorting the Zeliangrong people not to pay taxes. She received donations from the local people, many of whom also joined her as volunteers. The British authorities launched a manhunt for her. She evaded arrest by the police, moving across villages in what are now Assam, Nagaland and Manipur. The Governor of Assam dispatched the 3rd and 4th battalions of the Assam Rifles against her, under the supervision of the Naga Hills Deputy Commissioner JP Mills. Monetary rewards were declared for information leading to her arrest: this included a declaration that any village providing information on her whereabouts will get a 10-year tax break. Her forces engaged the Assam Rifles in armed conflicts in the North Cachar Hills (16 February 1932) and the Hangrum village (18 March 1932).

In October 1932, Gaidinliu moved to the Pulomi village, where her followers started building a wooden fortress. While the fortress was under construction, an Assam Rifles contingent headed by Captain MacDonald launched a surprise attack on the village on 17 October 1932. Gaidinliu, along with her followers, was arrested without any resistance near the Kenoma village. Gaidinliu denied that she had any role in the attack on the Hangrum post of the Assam Rifles or the construction of the fort. In December 1932, her followers from the Leng and the Bopungwemi villages murdered the Kuki chowkidar (watchman) of the Lakema Inspection Bungalow in the Hills, suspecting him to be the informer who led to her arrest. Gaidinliu was taken to Imphal, where she was convicted on the charges of murder and abetment of murder after a 10-month trial. She was sentenced to life imprisonment by the Political Agent's Court for abetment of murder. Most of her associates were either executed or jailed.

She established a tribal organization named Kabni Samiti in 1934.

From 1933 to 1947 she served time at the Guwahati, Shillong, Aizawl and Tura jails. Many rebels proclaimed her and Jadonang to be their inspiration in refusing to pay taxes to the British. However, her movement declined after the last of her followers, Dikeo and Ramjo, were arrested in 1933. Jawaharlal Nehru met her at the Shillong Jail in 1937 and he promised to pursue her release. His statement, published in the Hindustan Times, described Gaidinliu as a "daughter of the hills" and he gave her the title 'Rani' or Queen of her people. Nehru wrote to the British MP Lady Astor to do something for the release of Rani Gaidinliu but the Secretary of State for India rejected his request stating that trouble may rise again if Rani was released.

== Life in independent India ==
After the Interim Government of India was set up in 1946, Rani Gaidinliu was released on Prime Minister Nehru's orders from Tura jail, having spent 14 years in various prisons. She continued to work for the upliftment of her people after her release. She stayed at Vimrap village of Tuensang with her younger brother Marang till 1952. In 1952, she was finally allowed to move back to her native village of Longkao. In 1953, Prime Minister Nehru visited Imphal where Rani Gaidinliu met and conveyed to him the gratitude and goodwill of her people. Later she met Nehru in Delhi to discuss the development and welfare of Zeliangrong people.

Gaidinliu was opposed to the Naga National Council (NNC) insurgents, who advocated secessionism from India. Instead, she campaigned for a separate Zeliangrong territory within the Union of India. The rebel Naga leaders criticized Gaidinliu's movement for the integration of Zeliangrong tribes under one administrative unit. They were also opposed to her working for the revival of the traditional religion of animism or Heraka. The NNC leaders considered her actions an obstacle to their own movement. The Baptist leaders deemed the Heraka revival movement anti-Christian and she was warned of serious consequences if she were not to change her stand. In order to defend the Heraka culture and to strengthen her position, she went underground in 1960.

In 1966, after six years of hard underground life in old age, under an agreement with the Government of India, Rani Gaidinliu came out from her jungle hideout to work for the betterment of her people through peaceful, democratic and non-violent means. She went to Kohima on 20 January 1966, and met the Prime Minister Lal Bahadur Shastri in Delhi on 21 February 1966, demanding the creation of a separate Zeliangrong administrative unit. On 24 September 320 of her followers surrendered at Henima. Some of them were absorbed into the Nagaland Armed Police.

During her stay at Kohima, she was conferred "Tamrapatra Freedom Fighter Award" in 1972, the Padma Bhushan (1982) and the Vivekananda Seva Award (1983).

== Awards ==
- Tamrapatra Freedom Fighter Award-1972
- Padma Bhushan-1982
- Vivekananda Seva Award-1983
- Birsa Munda Award-posthumously

== Death ==
In 1991, Gaidinliu returned to her birthplace Longkao, where she died on 17 February 1993 at the age of 78.

The Governor of Manipur, Chintamani Panigrahi, the Home Secretary of Nagaland, officials from Manipur and many people from all parts of the North Eastern region attended her funeral at her native village. In Imphal, the Chief Minister of Manipur R.K. Dorendra Singh, Deputy Chief Minister, Rishang Keishing and others paid floral tributes and a general holiday was declared by the State Government.

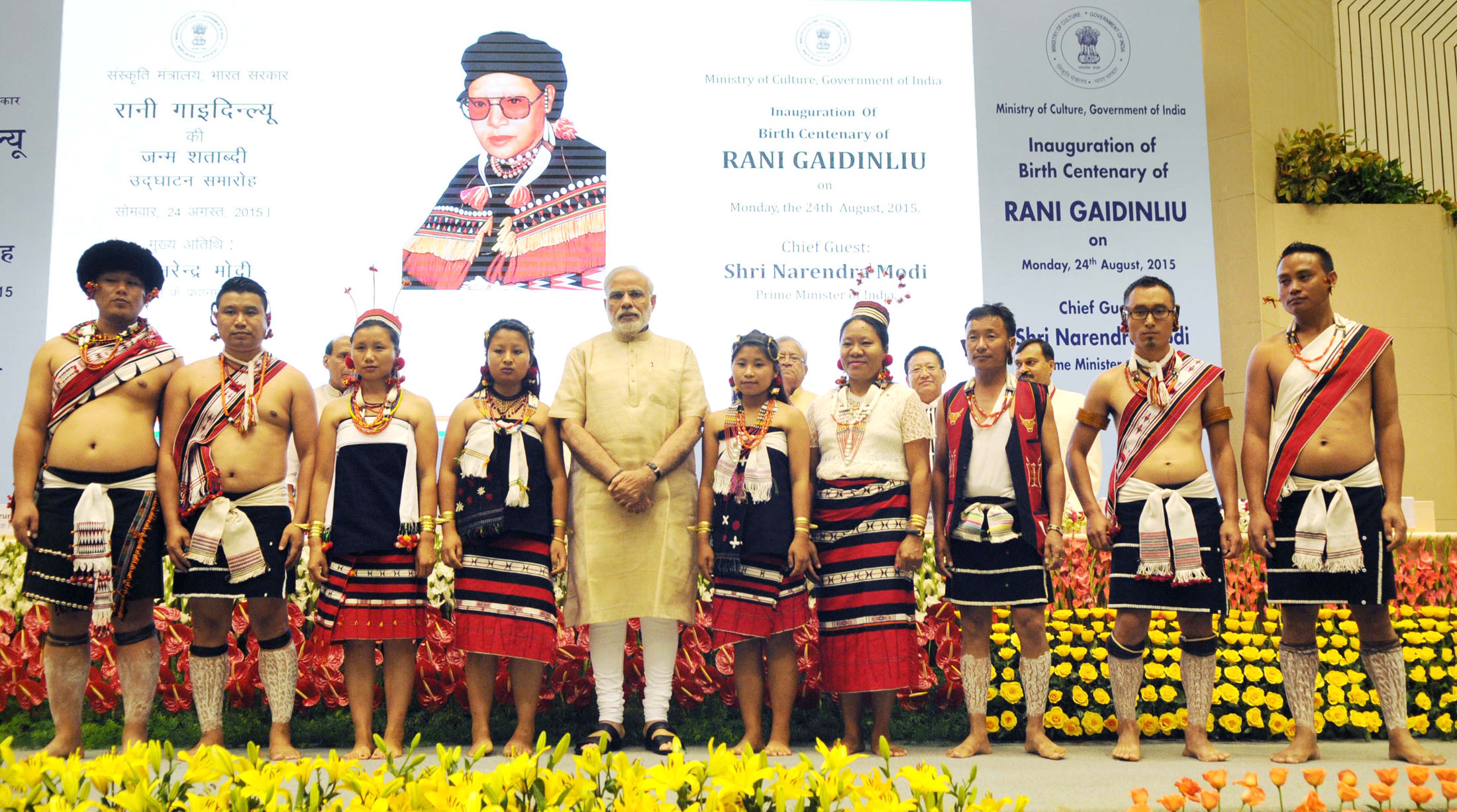
Inauguration of the celebrations of the centenary of Rani Gaidinliu, New Delhi, 2015

Rani Gaidinliu was also conferred the Birsa Munda Award posthumously. The Government of India issued a postal stamp in her honour in 1996. The Government of India issued a commemorative coin in her honour in 2015.

== Legacy ==
Because of the Heraka movement's hostility towards Christianity, Gaidinliu's heroics were not acknowledged highly among the Nagas, most of whom had converted to Christianity by the 1960s. The Naga nationalist groups don't recognize her either, because she was considered close to the Government of India. When the Hindu nationalist Sangh Parivar aligned with the Heraka movement in the 1970s, the perception that she was a promoter of Hinduism grew stronger among the Christian Nagas.

In 2015, when the Central government and T. R. Zeliang's state government decided to construct a Gaidinliu memorial hall, several civil society organizations in the Nagaland state opposed the move.
