= Kejanglwa =

- village
- Location Nagaland, India Kejanglwa (India)
- Coordinates: 25.548419°N 93.675156°E
- Country: India
- State: Nagaland
- District: Peren
- Circle: Jalukie

Population (2011)
  - Total: 505
- Time zone: UTC+5:30 (IST)
- Census code: 268324

Kejanglwa is a village in the Peren district of Nagaland, India. It is located in the Jalukie Circle.

== Demographics ==
According to the 2011 census of India, Kejanglwa has 94 households. The effective literacy rate (i.e. the literacy rate of population excluding children aged 6 and below) is 92.57%.

Demographics (2011 Census)
	Total	Male	Female
Population	505	256	249
Children aged below 6 years	88	39	49
Scheduled caste	0	0	0
Scheduled tribe	502	254	248
Literates	386	212	174
Workers (all)	233	121	112
Main workers (total)	230	118	112
Main workers: Cultivators	199	89	110
Main workers: Agricultural labourers	0	0	0
Main workers: Household industry workers	0	0	0
Main workers: Other	31	29	2
Marginal workers (total)	3	3	0
Marginal workers: Cultivators	2	2	0
Marginal workers: Agricultural labourers	0	0	0
Marginal workers: Household industry workers	0	0	0
Marginal workers: Others	1	1	0
Non-workers	272	135	137
