= Mhai =

- village
- Location in Nagaland, India Mhai (India)
- Coordinates: 25.567054°N 93.764949°E
- Country: India
- State: Nagaland
- District: Peren
- Circle: Jalukie

Population (2011)
  - Total: 594
- Time zone: UTC+5:30 (IST)
- Census code: 268323

Mhai is a village in the Peren district of Nagaland, India. It is located in the Jalukie Circle.

== Demographics ==
According to the 2011 census of India, Mhai has 117 households. The effective literacy rate (i.e. the literacy rate of population excluding children aged 6 and below) is 72.51%.

Demographics (2011 Census)
	Total	Male	Female
Population	594	298	296
Children aged below 6 years	81	39	42
Scheduled caste	0	0	0
Scheduled tribe	562	278	284
Literates	372	191	181
Workers (all)	496	250	246
Main workers (total)	272	127	145
Main workers: Cultivators	262	124	138
Main workers: Agricultural labourers	4	2	2
Main workers: Household industry workers	0	0	0
Main workers: Other	6	1	5
Marginal workers (total)	224	123	101
Marginal workers: Cultivators	219	119	100
Marginal workers: Agricultural labourers	5	4	1
Marginal workers: Household industry workers	0	0	0
Marginal workers: Others	0	0	0
Non-workers	98	48	50
