= Libamphai =

- village
- Location in Nagaland, India Libamphai (India)
- Coordinates: 25.640685°N 93.564695°E
- Country: India
- State: Nagaland
- District: Peren
- Circle: Jalukie

Population (2011)
  - Total: 207
- Time zone: UTC+5:30 (IST)
- Census code: 268308

Libamphai is a village in the Peren district of Nagaland, India. It is located in the Jalukie Circle.

== Demographics ==
According to the 2011 census of India, Libamphai has 37 households. The effective literacy rate (i.e. the literacy rate of population excluding children aged 6 and below) is 76.65%.

Demographics (2011 Census)
	Total	Male	Female
Population	207	100	107
Children aged below 6 years	40	23	17
Scheduled caste	0	0	0
Scheduled tribe	206	100	106
Literates	128	64	64
Workers (all)	106	51	55
Main workers (total)	87	43	44
Main workers: Cultivators	84	42	42
Main workers: Agricultural labourers	3	1	2
Main workers: Household industry workers	0	0	0
Main workers: Other	0	0	0
Marginal workers (total)	19	8	11
Marginal workers: Cultivators	1	0	1
Marginal workers: Agricultural labourers	15	7	8
Marginal workers: Household industry workers	1	1	0
Marginal workers: Others	2	0	2
Non-workers	101	49	52
