= Dzukwaram =

- village
- Location Nagaland, India Dzukwaram (India)
- Coordinates: 25.631202°N 93.721140°E
- Country: India
- State: Nagaland
- District: Peren
- Circle: Jalukie

Population (2011)
  - Total: 422
- Time zone: UTC+5:30 (IST)
- PIN: 797110
- Census code: 268325

Dzukwaram is a village in the Peren district of Nagaland, India. It is located in the Jalukie Circle.

== Demographics ==
According to the 2011 census of India, Dzukwaram has 82 households. The effective literacy rate (i.e. the literacy rate of population excluding children aged 6 and below) is 49.06%.

Demographics (2011 Census)
| | Total | Male | Female |
|---|---|---|---|
| Population | 422 | 219 | 203 |
| Children aged below 6 years | 51 | 27 | 24 |
| Scheduled caste | 0 | 0 | 0 |
| Scheduled tribe | 378 | 193 | 185 |
| Literates | 182 | 91 | 91 |
| Workers (all) | 350 | 177 | 173 |
| Main workers (total) | 222 | 116 | 106 |
| Main workers: Cultivators | 190 | 99 | 91 |
| Main workers: Agricultural labourers | 30 | 17 | 13 |
| Main workers: Household industry workers | 0 | 0 | 0 |
| Main workers: Other | 2 | 0 | 2 |
| Marginal workers (total) | 128 | 61 | 67 |
| Marginal workers: Cultivators | 125 | 59 | 66 |
| Marginal workers: Agricultural labourers | 3 | 2 | 1 |
| Marginal workers: Household industry workers | 0 | 0 | 0 |
| Marginal workers: Others | 0 | 0 | 0 |
| Non-workers | 72 | 42 | 30 |
