= Mhainamtsi =

- village
- Location in Nagaland, India Mhainamtsi (India)
- Coordinates: 25.632684°N 93.694596°E
- Country: India
- State: Nagaland
- District: Peren
- Circle: Jalukie

Population (2011)
  - Total: 1,590
- Time zone: UTC+5:30 (IST)
- Census code: 268314

Mhainamtsi is a village in the Peren district of Nagaland, India. It is located in the Jalukie Circle.

== Demographics ==
According to the 2011 census of India, Mhainamtsi has 327 households. The effective literacy rate (i.e. the literacy rate of population excluding children aged 6 and below) is 73.97%.

Demographics (2011 Census)
	Total	Male	Female
Population	1590	800	790
Children aged below 6 years	299	153	146
Scheduled caste	0	0	0
Scheduled tribe	699	354	345
Literates	955	524	431
Workers (all)	1142	576	566
Main workers (total)	444	294	150
Main workers: Cultivators	266	170	96
Main workers: Agricultural labourers	32	27	5
Main workers: Household industry workers	9	7	2
Main workers: Other	137	90	47
Marginal workers (total)	698	282	416
Marginal workers: Cultivators	537	215	322
Marginal workers: Agricultural labourers	48	16	32
Marginal workers: Household industry workers	3	2	1
Marginal workers: Others	110	49	61
Non-workers	448	224	224
