= Inpui Naga =

Inpui Naga may refer to:

- Inpui people or Inpui Naga people or Kabui, Naga people of northeastern India
  - Inpui Naga language, their Sino-Tibetan language

== See also ==
- Kabui Naga language (disambiguation)
