= Mhaikam =

- village
- Location in Nagaland, India Mhaikam (India)
- Coordinates: 25.644225°N 93.662542°E
- Country: India
- State: Nagaland
- District: Peren
- Circle: Jalukie

Population (2011)
  - Total: 706
- Time zone: UTC+5:30 (IST)
- Census code: 268310

Mhaikam is a village in the Peren district of Nagaland, India. It is located in the Jalukie Circle.

== Demographics ==
According to the 2011 census of India, Mhaikam has 146 households. The effective literacy rate (i.e. the literacy rate of population excluding children aged 6 and below) is 95.21%.

Demographics (2011 Census)
	Total	Male	Female
Population	706	346	360
Children aged below 6 years	122	59	63
Scheduled caste	0	0	0
Scheduled tribe	672	331	341
Literates	556	284	272
Workers (all)	389	198	191
Main workers (total)	347	178	169
Main workers: Cultivators	245	108	137
Main workers: Agricultural labourers	3	1	2
Main workers: Household industry workers	23	9	14
Main workers: Other	76	60	16
Marginal workers (total)	42	20	22
Marginal workers: Cultivators	30	13	17
Marginal workers: Agricultural labourers	3	1	2
Marginal workers: Household industry workers	4	2	2
Marginal workers: Others	5	4	1
Non-workers	317	148	169
