= Rongmei =

Rongmei may refer to:

- Rongmei people, an ethnic group of north-eastern India
- Rongmei language, the Sino-Tibetan language they speak

== See also ==
- Kabui Naga language (disambiguation)
