= Jalukie Upper Khel =

Jalukie Upper Khel Jalukie Upper Khel (UR)
- village
- Location in Nagaland, India Jalukie Upper Khel (India)
- Coordinates: 25.553410°N 93.735960°E
- Country: India
- State: Nagaland
- District: Peren
- Circle: Jalukie

Population (2011)
  - Total: 282
- Time zone: UTC+5:30 (IST)
- Census code: 268320

Jalukie Upper Khel is a village in the Peren district of Nagaland, India. It is located in the Jalukie Circle.

== Demographics ==
According to the 2011 census of India, Jalukie Upper Khel has 77 households. The effective literacy rate (i.e. the literacy rate of the population, excluding children ages 6 and below) is 25.66%.

Demographics (2011 Census)
	Total	Male	Female
Population	282	154	128
Children aged below 6 years	56	37	19
Scheduled caste	0	0	0
Scheduled tribe	268	144	124
Literates	58	38	20
Workers (all)	147	78	69
Main workers (total)	143	77	66
Main workers: Cultivators	132	67	65
Main workers: Agricultural labourers	0	0	0
Main workers: Household industry workers	0	0	0
Main workers: Other	11	10	1
Marginal workers (total)	4	1	3
Marginal workers: Cultivators	4	1	3
Marginal workers: Agricultural labourers	0	0	0
Marginal workers: Household industry workers	0	0	0
Marginal workers: Others	0	0	0
Non-workers	135	76	59
