= Dobashi =

Government-appointed interpreter and Naga customary law expert

Occupation
- Activity sectors: Law and Administration

Description
- Competencies: Critical thinking Language interpretation Law
- Fields of employment: Courts, government

A Dobashi, often abbreviated as DB, is a government-appointed official in Nagaland who serves as an interpreter, customary law expert and judicial assistant within the state's traditional and administrative system.

== Etymology ==
The term “Dobashi” is derived from the Hindustani word do-bhasha, meaning “two languages.” The name therefore means “an interpreter”.

== History ==
The Dobashi system originated in 1842 during the British colonial rule in India, when British officials in the Naga Hills required intermediaries to translate between English/Assamese and local Naga languages.

Dobashis were initially appointed at Kohima, the headquarters of the Naga Hills District of Assam. The Dobashis were later appointed in other subdivisions such as Wokha and Mokokchung. Their original role was limited to interpretation but their responsibilities gradually expanded to include involvement in civil and criminal cases as well as in the administration of justice.

== Functions ==
Dobashis perform several key roles:

- Interpreters between government officials and local communities
- Advisors on Naga customary law
- Assistants in courts, especially in cases involving traditional practices
- Mediators in disputes at village and district levels

== Legal and administrative role ==
Dobashis are attached to the Deputy Commissioner's offices, Sub-divisional administrative offices and Customary courts. They play an important role in applying customary law alongside the formal legal system.

== Significance ==
Nagaland follows a system where customary tribal law is officially recognized under the Constitution of India. The Dobashis act as a bridge between traditional institutions and modern administration, ensuring that governance respects local customs.

== See also ==
- Nagaland Dobashi Association
- Dragoman
