= Old Jalukie =

Old Jalukie Jalukie (Old)
- village
- Location in Nagaland, India Old Jalukie (India)
- Coordinates: 25.589748°N 93.675094°E
- Country: India
- State: Nagaland
- District: Peren
- Circle: Jalukie

Population (2011)
  - Total: 1,087
- Time zone: UTC+5:30 (IST)
- Census code: 268321

Old Jalukie is a village in the Peren district of Nagaland, India. It is located in the Jalukie Circle.

== Demographics ==
According to the 2011 census of India, Old Jalukie has 190 households. The effective literacy rate (i.e. the literacy rate of the population excluding children aged 6 and below) is 95.38%.

Demographics (2011 Census)
	Total	Male	Female
Population	1087	896	191
Children aged below 6 years	91	47	44
Scheduled caste	0	0	0
Scheduled tribe	158	111	47
Literates	950	835	115
Workers (all)	897	831	66
Main workers (total)	853	827	26
Main workers: Cultivators	34	16	18
Main workers: Agricultural labourers	1	0	1
Main workers: Household industry workers	8	8	0
Main workers: Other	810	803	7
Marginal workers (total)	44	4	40
Marginal workers: Cultivators	2	0	2
Marginal workers: Agricultural labourers	0	0	0
Marginal workers: Household industry workers	0	0	0
Marginal workers: Others	42	4	38
Non-workers	190	65	125
