= Jalukie Zangdi =

- village
- Location Nagaland, India Jalukie Zangdi (India)
- Coordinates: 25.537381°N 93.682495°E
- Country: India
- State: Nagaland
- District: Peren
- Circle: Jalukie

Population (2011)
  - Total: 1,608
- Time zone: UTC+5:30 (IST)
- Census code: 268307

Jalukie Zangdi is a village in the Peren district of Nagaland, India. It is located in the Jalukie Circle.

== Demographics ==
According to the 2011 census of India, Jalukie Zangdi has 389 households. The effective literacy rate (i.e. the literacy rate of population excluding children aged 6 and below) is 69.39%.

Demographics (2011 Census)
	Total	Male	Female
Population	1608	890	718
Children aged below 6 years	337	195	142
Scheduled caste	0	0	0
Scheduled tribe	1408	781	627
Literates	882	487	395
Workers (all)	1302	706	596
Main workers (total)	636	406	230
Main workers: Cultivators	592	379	213
Main workers: Agricultural labourers	3	3	0
Main workers: Household industry workers	2	1	1
Main workers: Other	39	23	16
Marginal workers (total)	666	300	366
Marginal workers: Cultivators	647	289	358
Marginal workers: Agricultural labourers	3	3	0
Marginal workers: Household industry workers	4	2	2
Marginal workers: Others	12	6	6
Non-workers	306	184	122
