= Jalukie Lower Khel =

Jalukie Lower Khel Jalukie Lower Khel (UR)
- village
- Location in Nagaland, India Jalukie Lower Khel (India)
- Coordinates: 25.602048°N 93.655159°E
- Country: India
- State: Nagaland
- District: Peren
- Circle: Jalukie

Population (2011)
  - Total: 306
- Time zone: UTC+5:30 (IST)
- Census code: 268317

Jalukie Lower Khel is a village in the Peren district of Nagaland, India. It is located in the Jalukie Circle.

== Demographics ==
According to the 2011 census of India, Jalukie Lower Khel has 75 households. The effective literacy rate (i.e. the literacy rate of population excluding children aged 6 and below) is 85.71%.

Demographics (2011 Census)
	Total	Male	Female
Population	306	132	174
Children aged below 6 years	54	24	30
Scheduled caste	0	0	0
Scheduled tribe	306	132	174
Literates	216	97	119
Workers (all)	209	91	118
Main workers (total)	137	61	76
Main workers: Cultivators	126	57	69
Main workers: Agricultural labourers	1	0	1
Main workers: Household industry workers	1	0	1
Main workers: Other	9	4	5
Marginal workers (total)	72	30	42
Marginal workers: Cultivators	8	3	5
Marginal workers: Agricultural labourers	0	0	0
Marginal workers: Household industry workers	0	0	0
Marginal workers: Others	64	27	37
Non-workers	97	41	56
