= Nagaland Dobashi Association =

Organisation

- Abbreviation: NDBA
- Formation: 1962; 64 years ago
- Legal status: Active
- Headquarters: Kohima, Nagaland, India
- Official language: English, and the affiliated member's language when necessary
- President: Notho Koso
- Motto: Backbone of Administration

The Nagaland Dobashi Association (NDBA) is an organisation based in the Indian state of Nagaland. Founded in 1962, it is the apex organisation representing Dobashis in the state of Nagaland.

Dobashis are traditional functionaries who serve as interpreters, mediators and custodians of the Naga customary law. The association works to preserve and promote indigenous legal systems and support administrative process.

The Nagaland Dobashi Association was established to organize and represent Dobashis across the state and to strengthen their role in the Naga society.

== Roles and Functions ==
Dobashis perform a variety of roles within the administrative and legal framework of Nagaland, including:

- Serves as interpreters between government officials and local communities
- Assist courts in cases involving customary law
- Mediate disputes within villages and tribal groups
- Supporting district administration and law enforcement agencies
- Preserving traditional knowledge and practices

== List of association presidents ==
| President | Session | Reference |
|---|---|---|
| Notho Koso | 2025–Incumbent | |
| Vikheho Sema | 2022–2025 | |
| Noklemtoba Ao | 2019–2022 | |
| Thipuzhoyo Thira | 2012–2019 | |
| T. Siyang Chang | 2006–2012 | |
| T. Aiwang Konyak | 2003–2006 | |
| M. Toshi Ao | 1993–2003 | |
| Pukron Kikhi | 1987–1993 | |
| Neichalhoulie Angami | 1984–1987 | |
| Thekruvilie Angami | 1980–1984 | |
| H. Kawoto Sema | 1976–1980 | |
| Neihutuo Angami | 1970–1976 | |
| I. Kawoto Kinimi | 1968–1970 | |
| Phyolumo Lotha | 1966–1968 | |
| I. Kawoto Kinimi | 1962–1966 | |
