= Samziuram =

- village
- Location in Nagaland, India Samziuram (India)
- Coordinates: 25.594294°N 93.648738°E
- Country: India
- State: Nagaland
- District: Peren
- Circle: Jalukie

Population (2011)
  - Total: 3,909
- Time zone: UTC+5:30 (IST)
- Census code: 268318

Samziuram is a village in the Peren district of Nagaland, India. It is located in the Jalukie Circle.

== Demographics ==
According to the 2011 census of India, Samziuram has 727 households. The effective literacy rate (i.e. the literacy rate of population excluding children aged 6 and below) is 87.45%.

Demographics (2011 Census)
	Total	Male	Female
Population	3909	1967	1942
Children aged below 6 years	595	317	278
Scheduled caste	0	0	0
Scheduled tribe	2779	1375	1404
Literates	2898	1511	1387
Workers (all)	2690	1344	1346
Main workers (total)	1469	798	671
Main workers: Cultivators	1082	561	521
Main workers: Agricultural labourers	16	8	8
Main workers: Household industry workers	42	8	34
Main workers: Other	329	221	108
Marginal workers (total)	1221	546	675
Marginal workers: Cultivators	654	327	327
Marginal workers: Agricultural labourers	58	40	18
Marginal workers: Household industry workers	187	12	175
Marginal workers: Others	322	167	155
Non-workers	1219	623	596
