= Nkwareu =

- village
- Location in Nagaland, India Nkwareu (India)
- Coordinates: 25.605862°N 93.642220°E
- Country: India
- State: Nagaland
- District: Peren
- Circle: Jalukie

Population (2011)
  - Total: 742
- Time zone: UTC+5:30 (IST)
- Census code: 268312

Nkwareu is a village in the Peren district of Nagaland, India. It is located in the Jalukie Circle.

== Demographics ==
According to the 2011 census of India, Nkwareu has 123 households. The effective literacy rate (i.e. the literacy rate of population excluding children aged 6 and below) is 74.36%.

Demographics (2011 Census)
	Total	Male	Female
Population	742	384	358
Children aged below 6 years	153	86	67
Scheduled caste	0	0	0
Scheduled tribe	381	190	191
Literates	438	245	193
Workers (all)	485	241	244
Main workers (total)	320	160	160
Main workers: Cultivators	88	47	41
Main workers: Agricultural labourers	0	0	0
Main workers: Household industry workers	1	0	1
Main workers: Other	231	113	118
Marginal workers (total)	165	81	84
Marginal workers: Cultivators	27	15	12
Marginal workers: Agricultural labourers	0	0	0
Marginal workers: Household industry workers	1	0	1
Marginal workers: Others	137	66	71
Non-workers	257	143	114
