= New Jalukie =

- village
- Location in Nagaland, India New Jalukie (India)
- Coordinates: 25.662460°N 93.693534°E
- Country: India
- State: Nagaland
- District: Peren
- Circle: Jalukie

Population (2011)
  - Total: 2,470
- Time zone: UTC+5:30 (IST)
- Census code: 268315

New Jalukie is a village in the Peren district of Nagaland, India. It is located in the Jalukie Circle.

== Demographics ==
According to the 2011 census of India, New Jalukie has 411 households. The effective literacy rate (i.e. the literacy rate of population excluding children aged 6 and below) is 78.84%.

Demographics (2011 Census)
	Total	Male	Female
Population	2470	1276	1194
Children aged below 6 years	339	188	151
Scheduled caste	0	0	0
Scheduled tribe	1018	528	490
Literates	1680	899	781
Workers (all)	1569	807	762
Main workers (total)	1091	579	512
Main workers: Cultivators	785	398	387
Main workers: Agricultural labourers	4	2	2
Main workers: Household industry workers	8	2	6
Main workers: Other	294	177	117
Marginal workers (total)	478	228	250
Marginal workers: Cultivators	208	97	111
Marginal workers: Agricultural labourers	3	0	3
Marginal workers: Household industry workers	48	20	28
Marginal workers: Others	219	111	108
Non-workers	901	469	432
