= Flag of the Nagalim movement =

Flag of the Naga people

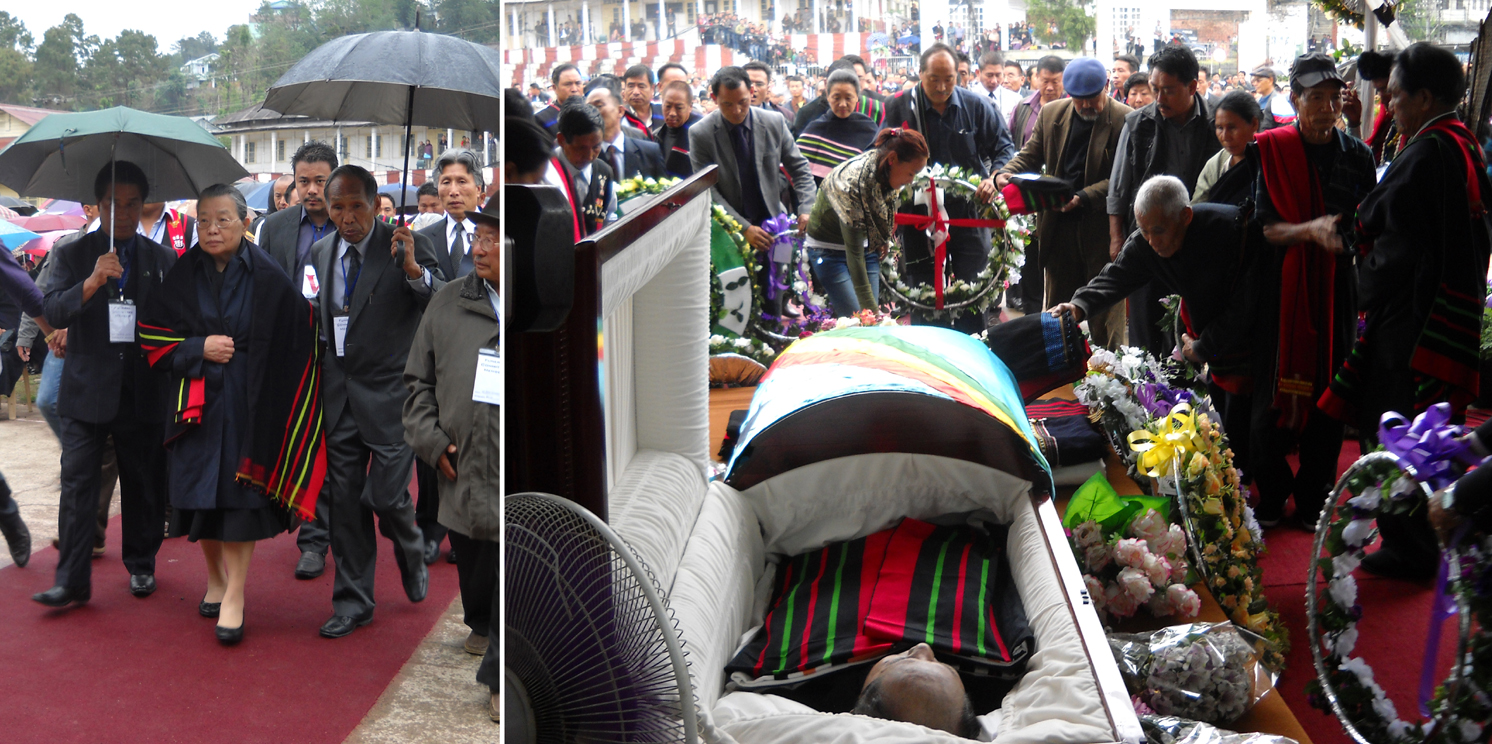
The flag of Nagaland draped over the mortal remains of Kevilevor Phizo, Zapu Phizo's son on 28 April 2013 in Kohima.

The flag of the Nagalim movement is medium sky blue which symbolizes the sky. A rainbow arch section, simplified to red, yellow and green, runs across the centre. In the upper corner, next to the staff, there is a white Star of Bethlehem. Both symbols represent Christianity, the faith and identity of the majority of the Naga people.

The flag is often used to represent the Naga people. However, it does not have official status in any area where the Nagas live.

== History ==
The flag was flown for the first time in the Parashen-Rengma area of Assam state (now Nagaland) on 22 March 1956 by the Naga National Council, led by Zapu Phizo. It was adopted as a symbol of Naga nationalism and has been used by insurgent groups seeking self-determination for over seven decades.

The Naga flag holds deep historical and spiritual significance for the Naga people, symbolizing their identity, resilience, and aspirations for self-determination. According to historical accounts, the flag's design was inspired by a divine revelation, as a rainbow appeared over the Naga Club building during its consecration, signifying peace with God. The rainbow, enshrined in the flag's design, represents divine approval, unity, and the hope for an independent Naga nation. Rooted in the struggles and sacrifices of the Nagas, the flag embodies their desire for sovereignty, as reinforced by Mahatma Gandhi’s recognition of their right to independence. It serves as a reminder of the Naga people's historical assertion of self-rule, their cultural and racial distinctiveness, and their ongoing struggle against political subjugation. Observing Naga Independence Day on August 14th, a day before India's independence, further solidifies the flag’s role as a symbol of resistance, faith, and the enduring spirit of the Naga nation.

Following the Naga Peace Accord that sought to end the long insurgency, the Naga representatives formally requested an official status for the flag, as well as a separate Constitution (Yehzabo) for the Naga people. However, so far the Indian government representatives have remained adamant on the issue, refusing to grant a co-official status to the flag such as the one that was granted between 1952 and 2019 to the state of Jammu and Kashmir under Article 370 of the Constitution of India. Hence the Naga flag issue has stalled the peace process.

== Bibliography ==
- Nandita Haksar, Sebastian M. Hongray. Kuknalim, Naga Armed Resistance: Testimonies Of Leaders, Pastors, Healers And Soldiers. Speaking Tiger Publishing Pvt. Ltd., 2019, ISBN 978-93-88874-93-9, 978-93-88874-92-2

== See also ==
- Emblem of Nagaland
- Flag of Jammu and Kashmir
- Unrepresented Nations and Peoples Organization
