= Jalukiekam =

- village
- Location in Nagaland, India Jalukiekam (India)
- Coordinates: 25.534307°N 93.718130°E
- Country: India
- State: Nagaland
- District: Peren
- Circle: Jalukie

Population (2011)
  - Total: 525
- Time zone: UTC+5:30 (IST)
- Census code: 268306

Jalukiekam is a village in the Peren district of Nagaland, India. It is located in the Jalukie Circle.

== Demographics ==
According to the 2011 census of India, Jalukiekam has 132 households. The effective literacy rate (i.e. the literacy rate of population excluding children aged 6 and below) is 93.04%.

Demographics (2011 Census)
	Total	Male	Female
Population	525	282	243
Children aged below 6 years	94	52	42
Scheduled caste	0	0	0
Scheduled tribe	520	279	241
Literates	401	218	183
Workers (all)	363	193	170
Main workers (total)	210	139	71
Main workers: Cultivators	156	97	59
Main workers: Agricultural labourers	0	0	0
Main workers: Household industry workers	13	13	0
Main workers: Other	41	29	12
Marginal workers (total)	153	54	99
Marginal workers: Cultivators	129	46	83
Marginal workers: Agricultural labourers	3	1	2
Marginal workers: Household industry workers	5	2	3
Marginal workers: Others	16	5	11
Non-workers	162	89	73
