= Jalukieram =

- village
- Location in Nagaland, India Jalukieram (India)
- Coordinates: 25.570°N 93.727°Ea
- Country: India
- State: Nagaland
- District: Peren
- Circle: Jalukie

Population (2011)
  - Total: 246
- Time zone: UTC+5:30 (IST)
- Census code: 268319

Jalukieram is a village in the Peren district of Nagaland, India. It is located in the Jalukie Circle.

== Demographics ==
According to the 2011 census of India, Jalukieram has 58 households. The effective literacy rate (i.e. the literacy rate of population excluding children aged 6 and below) is 54.14%.

Demographics (2011 Census)
	Total	Male	Female
Population	246	133	113
Children aged below 6 years	65	34	31
Scheduled caste	0	0	0
Scheduled tribe	235	127	108
Literates	98	60	38
Workers (all)	183	98	85
Main workers (total)	131	70	61
Main workers: Cultivators	121	64	57
Main workers: Agricultural labourers	0	0	0
Main workers: Household industry workers	0	0	0
Main workers: Other	10	6	4
Marginal workers (total)	52	28	24
Marginal workers: Cultivators	47	24	23
Marginal workers: Agricultural labourers	0	0	0
Marginal workers: Household industry workers	0	0	0
Marginal workers: Others	5	4	1
Non-workers	63	35	28
