= Jalukie Rongdai =

Jalukie Rongdai Jalukie Rongdai (UR)
- village
- Location in Nagaland, India Jalukie Rongdai (India)
- Coordinates: 25.570°N 93.728°E
- Country: India
- State: Nagaland
- District: Peren
- Circle: Jalukie

Population (2011)
  - Total: 71
- Time zone: UTC+5:30 (IST)
- Census code: 268313

Jalukie Rongdai is a village in the Peren district of Nagaland, India. It is located in the Jalukie Circle.

== Demographics ==
According to the 2011 census of India, Jalukie Rongdai has 14 households. The effective literacy rate (i.e. the literacy rate of population excluding children aged 6 and below) is 69.49%.

Demographics (2011 Census)
	Total	Male	Female
Population	71	37	34
Children aged below 6 years	12	7	5
Scheduled caste	0	0	0
Scheduled tribe	0	0	0
Literates	41	22	19
Workers (all)	53	27	26
Main workers (total)	43	22	21
Main workers: Cultivators	36	18	18
Main workers: Agricultural labourers	0	0	0
Main workers: Household industry workers	0	0	0
Main workers: Other	7	4	3
Marginal workers (total)	10	5	5
Marginal workers: Cultivators	0	0	0
Marginal workers: Agricultural labourers	0	0	0
Marginal workers: Household industry workers	0	0	0
Marginal workers: Others	10	5	5
Non-workers	18	10	8
