= Jalukie B =

Jalukie B Jalukie 'B', Jalukie (B)
- village
- Location in Nagaland, India Jalukie B (India)
- Coordinates: 25.608936°N 93.665238°E
- Country: India
- State: Nagaland
- District: Peren
- Circle: Jalukie

Population (2011)
  - Total: 2,387
- Time zone: UTC+5:30 (IST)
- Census code: 268316

Jalukie 'B' is a village in the Peren district of Nagaland, India. It is located in the Jalukie Circle.

== Demographics ==
According to the 2011 census of India, Jalukie 'B' has 431 households. The effective literacy rate (i.e. the literacy rate of population excluding children aged 6 and below) is 81.36%.

Demographics (2011 Census)
	Total	Male	Female
Population	2387	1197	1190
Children aged below 6 years	391	175	216
Scheduled caste	0	0	0
Scheduled tribe	2115	1057	1058
Literates	1624	911	713
Workers (all)	1033	503	530
Main workers (total)	975	484	491
Main workers: Cultivators	742	323	419
Main workers: Agricultural labourers	4	0	4
Main workers: Household industry workers	0	0	0
Main workers: Other	229	161	68
Marginal workers (total)	58	19	39
Marginal workers: Cultivators	53	17	36
Marginal workers: Agricultural labourers	1	0	1
Marginal workers: Household industry workers	0	0	0
Marginal workers: Others	4	2	2
Non-workers	1354	694	660
