= Jalukielo =

- village
- Location in Nagaland, India Jalukielo (India)
- Coordinates: 25.618959°N 93.638510°E
- Country: India
- State: Nagaland
- District: Peren
- Circle: Jalukie

Population (2011)
  - Total: 332
- Time zone: UTC+5:30 (IST)
- Census code: 268311

Jalukielo is a village in the Peren district of Nagaland, India. It is located in the Jalukie Circle.

== Demographics ==
According to the 2011 census of India, Jalukielo has 76 households. The effective literacy rate (i.e. the literacy rate of population excluding children aged 6 and below) is 92.83%.

Demographics (2011 Census)
	Total	Male	Female
Population	332	193	139
Children aged below 6 years	39	15	24
Scheduled caste	0	0	0
Scheduled tribe	270	154	116
Literates	272	170	102
Workers (all)	200	122	78
Main workers (total)	122	83	39
Main workers: Cultivators	117	79	38
Main workers: Agricultural labourers	0	0	0
Main workers: Household industry workers	0	0	0
Main workers: Other	5	4	1
Marginal workers (total)	78	39	39
Marginal workers: Cultivators	6	2	4
Marginal workers: Agricultural labourers	70	36	34
Marginal workers: Household industry workers	0	0	0
Marginal workers: Others	2	1	1
Non-workers	132	71	61
