= Jalukie Sangtam =

Jalukie Sangtam Jalukie 'S', Jalukie (S), J Sangtam
- village
- Location in Nagaland, India Jalukie Sangtam (India)
- Coordinates: 25.635272°N 93.559227°E
- Country: India
- State: Nagaland
- District: Peren
- Circle: Jalukie

Population (2011)
  - Total: 196
- Time zone: UTC+5:30 (IST)
- Census code: 268309

Jalukie Sangtam is a village in the Peren district of Nagaland, India. It is located in the Jalukie Circle.

== Demographics ==
According to the 2011 census of India, Jalukie 'S' (J. Sangtam) has 37 households. The effective literacy rate (i.e. the literacy rate of population excluding children aged 6 and below) is 92.5%.

Demographics (2011 Census)
	Total	Male	Female
Population	196	104	92
Children aged below 6 years	36	18	18
Scheduled caste	0	0	0
Scheduled tribe	192	101	91
Literates	148	84	64
Workers (all)	112	61	51
Main workers (total)	94	53	41
Main workers: Cultivators	88	48	40
Main workers: Agricultural labourers	1	0	1
Main workers: Household industry workers	0	0	0
Main workers: Other	5	5	0
Marginal workers (total)	18	8	10
Marginal workers: Cultivators	9	4	5
Marginal workers: Agricultural labourers	9	4	5
Marginal workers: Household industry workers	0	0	0
Marginal workers: Others	0	0	0
Non-workers	84	43	41
