= Heraka =

- Type: Ethnic religion
- Scripture: Tingwang Hingde and Thousumei Kashoi Kadam
- Theology: Monotheistic
- Founder: Haipou Jadonang
- Separated from: Characheng
- Members: 30,000 (approximately)

Heraka is a socio-religious reform and political movement and ethnic religion that originated in the late 1920s among the Zeliangrong Naga people (a collective identity that includes the Inpui, Zeme, Liangmai, and Rongmei tribes), indigenous to the tri-junction of Assam, Manipur and Nagaland in India.

The word Heraka literally translates to "pure" in the Zeme language. It was founded by the spiritual leader, reformist and political activist Haipou Jadonang in Manipur to defend indigenous traditions against British colonial rules and the heavy influx of Christian missionaries. After Jadonang was executed by the British in 1931, his 16-year-old cousin, Rani Gaidinliu, took over the leadership.

== History ==
Before the arrival of the British and Christianisation of the tribes, the Zeliangrong people used to follow Characheng, the primal Naga religion. When Christianity was introduced by Western missionaries and later by indigenous evangelists, Characheng was almost destroyed. In response, Characheng reformed and developed into a new religious group known as Heraka in order to counter Christian conversion among the Nagas.

== Spiritual and Social Beliefs ==
Before Heraka, Characheng, the traditional Naga religion involved a heavy reliance on a complex pantheon of lesser spirits, strict local taboos (gennas), and animal sacrifices. Heraka radically reformed these practices:

- Monotheism: The primal religion of Characheng believed in Tingwang (or Tingkao Ragwang) the Supreme Being, and a number of demigods, and spirits. Heraka emphasizes monotheism, with the exclusive worship of Tingwang and not the other demigods and spirits.
- Abolition of Tribal Wars: Earlier, there used to be frequent inter-village and inter-tribal wars. Heraka abolished these, and introduced peace among Nagas.
- Abolition of Sacrifices: To alleviate poverty and food shortages caused by colonial taxes and famines, Heraka banned the expensive, burdensome animal sacrifices previously required by local medicine men.
- Abolition of Restrictive Gennas: The movement abolished many village taboos (gennas) that barred people from working or leaving their homes during crucial farming days. This heavily optimized agricultural output and gave the community greater economic freedom.
- Gender equality: Heraka encourages women in ritual roles like healers and participating in village prayers. That Rani Gaidinliu was the leader of the movement for a long period of time is seen as an example of gender equality in Heraka.
- Communitarian Moral and Ethical Framework: At the heart of Heraka's moral framework is Chaliuroubo, which defines the core moral and ethical framework of altruism, respect, hospitableness, compassion, kindness, and sharing in community life. It is to live for others and for the community.
- Structured Worship (Kalumki): Borrowing organizational structural elements from mainstream religions, Heraka established fixed temple-style prayer houses called Kelumki. Heraka established a liturgy where devotees gather in the temples to pray towards the eastern sunrise, sing composed hymns, and practice moral, and communal discipline.
- Written scriptures: Heraka introduced written scriptures called Tingwang Hingde and Thousumei Kashoi Kadam.

== Current following ==
Today, Heraka is a well-established minority faith among the Nagas, with an estimated population of 25,000 to 30,000 active followers. While it accounts for only a small percentage of the broader, overwhelmingly Christian Naga population, it has successfully preserved the ancestral lineage of the Zeliangrong people.
