= Naga Hills District, British India =

Coordinates: 25.46°N 93.46°E

Naga Hills District
- Former district
- Interactive map of Naga Hills District
- Country: India
- State: Assam
- Established: 1866
- Disestablished: 1957
- Named for: Naga Hills

Area
  - Total: 9,446 km^{2} (3,647 sq mi)
- Gazetteer Of Naga Hills And Manipur (1905)

The Naga Hills District was a former district of the North-East Frontier province (later, Assam Province) of British India. Located in the Naga Hills, it was mainly inhabited by the Naga ethnic groups. The area is now part of the state of Nagaland.

== History ==
=== British colonial rule ===
The Naga Hills district was created in 1866 by the Government of British India. Its headquarters were located at Samaguting (present day Chümoukedima).

In 1875, the Lotha Naga region was conquered and annexed to the district. An administrative center was established at Wokha; this center was shifted to Kohima on 14 November 1878. In 1889, the Ao region was fully annexed to the Naga Hills District as a subdivision. The boundaries of the District were further extended to include most of the Sümi Naga (Sema Naga) territories (1904) and the Konyak Naga region (1910). In 1912, the Naga Hills District was made part of the Assam Province. The Government of India Act 1919 declared the Naga Hills District as a "Backward Tract". The area was to be treated as an entity separate from the British Indian Empire.

In the early 1930s, some of the ethnic groups in the region rebelled against the British rule under the leadership of Haipou Jadonang and Rani Gaidinliu. As per the Government of India Act 1935, the area was made an "Excluded Area", administered by the Governor of Assam. The Deputy Commissioner of the district, CR Pawsney, established the Naga Hills District Tribal Council in 1945, which later evolved into the Naga National Council in the 1945.

==== Deputy commissioners of the Naga Hills District ====
- 1912 – 1913: J. K. Webster
- 1913 – 1917: H. C. Berners
- 1917 – 1935: John Henry Hutton (b. 1885 – d. 1968)
- 1935 – 1937: James Philip Mills (b. 1890 – d. 1960)
- 1937 – 1947: Charles Ridley Pawsey (b. 1894 – d. 1972)

=== Post-Indian independence and attaining statehood ===
Under the leadership of A. Z. Phizo, the Naga National Council unsuccessfully led a secessionist movement. When the Constitution of India was first released in 1950, the Naga Hills District was placed in "Part A" category of tribal districts as per the Sixth Schedule. The Part A areas were supposed to be governed by the Government of Assam in collaboration with the Autonomous District Councils. However, the Naga leaders refused this scheme. Subsequently, the Naga Hills District, along with the Tuensang Division (then a "Part B" area in the North-East Frontier Agency) were made a new administrative unit under the Ministry of External Affairs in 1957. After negotiation with the secessionists, this administrative unit was later made a full-fledged state called Nagaland.
