= Postharvest =

Stage of crop production immediately after harvest

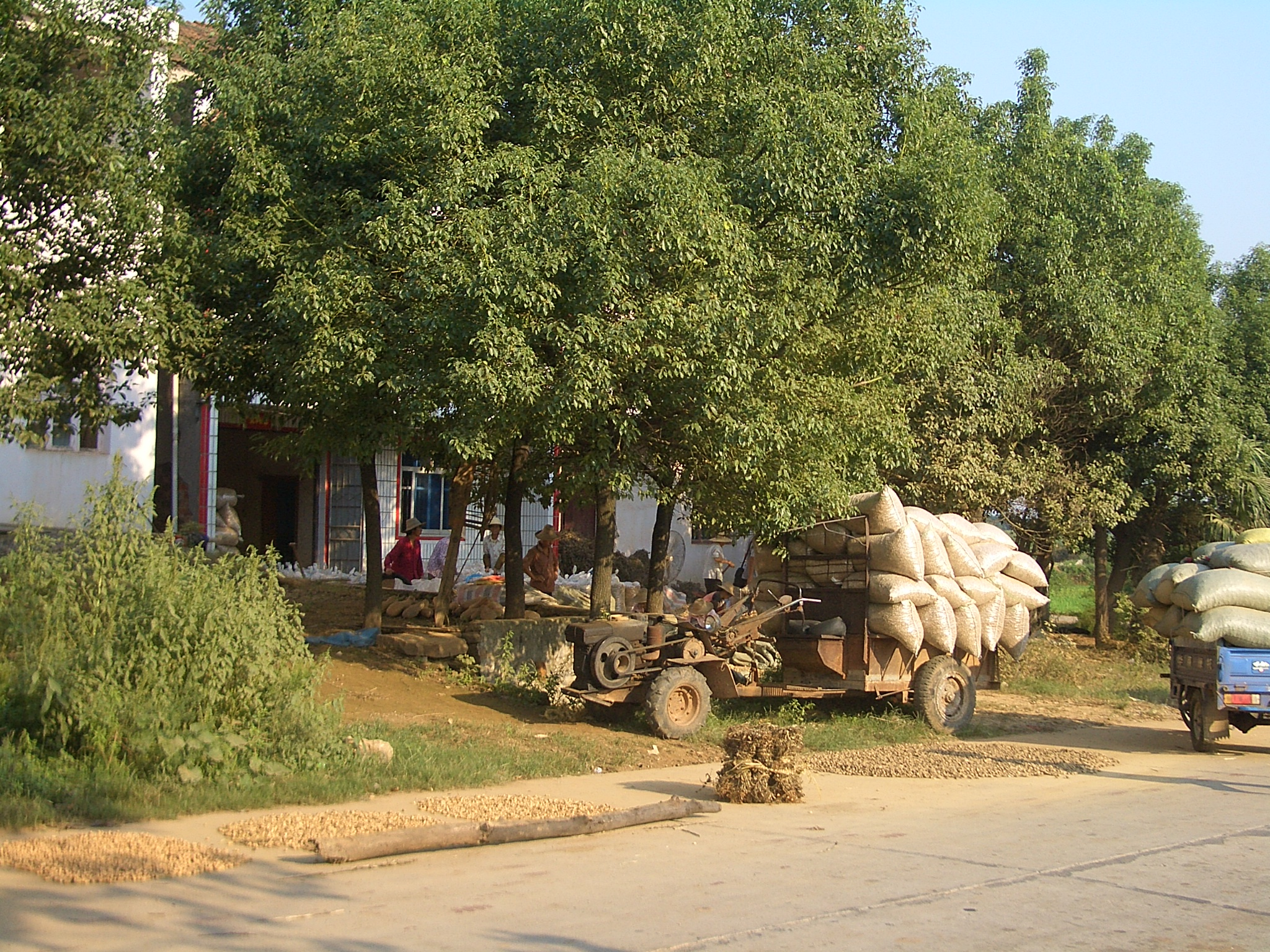
Drying and bagging of peanuts in Jiangxia District, Hubei, China

In agriculture, postharvest handling is the stage of crop production immediately following harvest, including cooling, cleaning, sorting and packing. The instant a crop is removed from the ground, or separated from its parent plant, it begins to deteriorate. Postharvest treatment largely determines final quality, whether a crop is sold for fresh consumption, or used as an ingredient in a processed food product.

== Goals ==
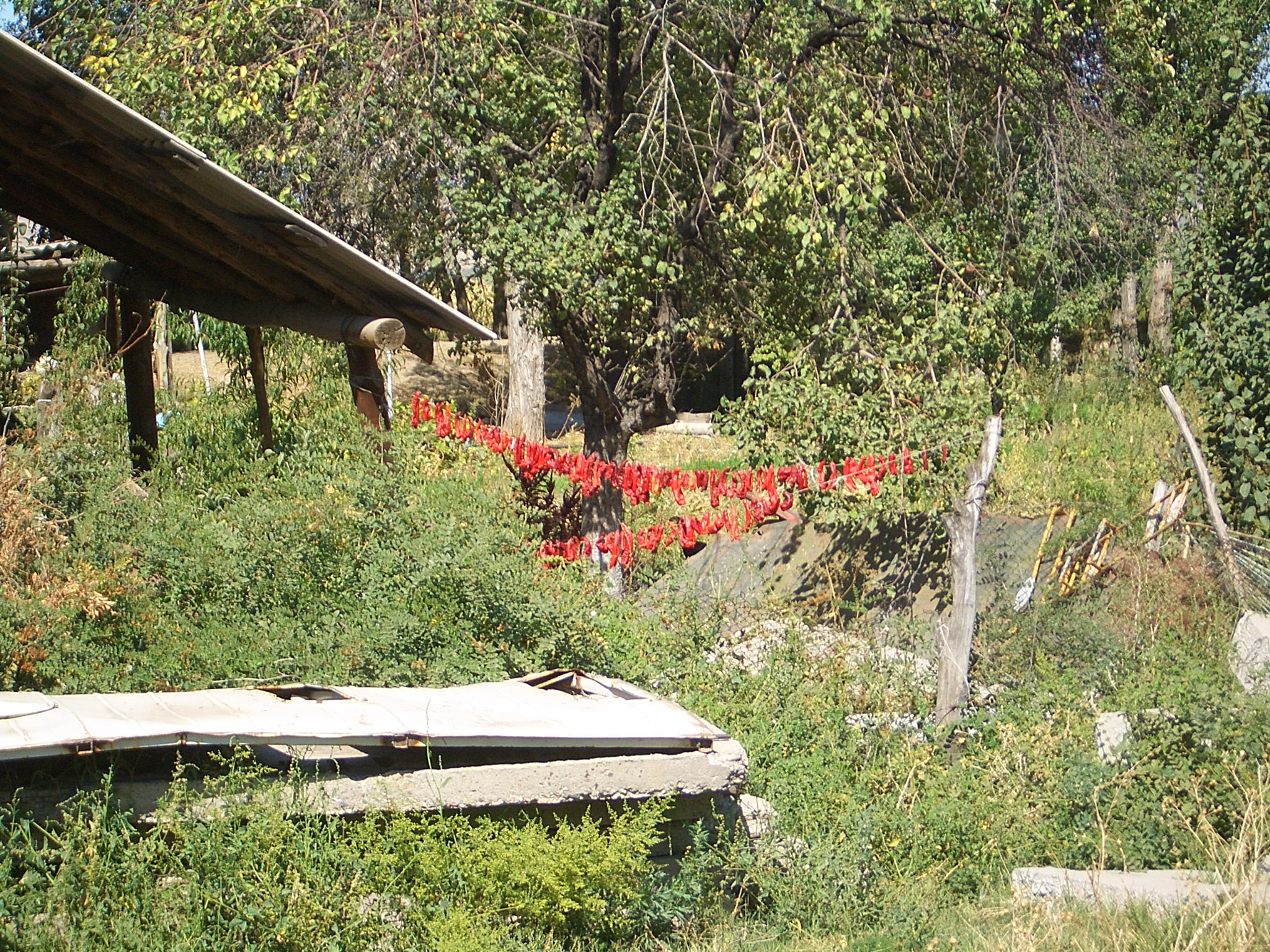
Drying chili peppers in Milyanfan, Kyrgyzstan

The most important goals of post-harvest handling are to keep the product cool and safe, to avoid moisture loss and slow down undesirable chemical changes, and avoiding physical damage such as bruising, to delay spoilage. Sanitation is also an important factor, to reduce the possibility of pathogens that could be carried by fresh produce, for example, as residue from contaminated washing water.

Crops such as wheat and corn are bound together into sheaves: typically, sheaves are assembled before any separation of grain and straw takes place. After gathering and bundling in the field, post-harvest processing is usually continued in a packing house. This can be a simple shed, providing shade and running water, or a large-scale, sophisticated, mechanised facility, with conveyor belts, automated sorting and packing stations, walk-in coolers and the like. In mechanised harvesting, processing may also begin as part of the actual harvest process, with initial cleaning and sorting performed by the harvesting machinery.

Initial post-harvest storage conditions are critical to maintaining quality. Each crop has an optimum range of storage temperature and humidity. Also, certain crops cannot be effectively stored together, as unwanted chemical interactions can result. Various methods of high-speed cooling, and sophisticated refrigerated and atmosphere-controlled environments, are employed to prolong freshness, particularly in large-scale operations.

== Postharvest shelf life ==
Once harvested, vegetables and fruits are subject to the active process of degradation. Numerous biochemical processes continuously change the original composition of the crop until it becomes unmarketable. The period during which consumption is considered acceptable is defined as the time of "postharvest shelf life".

Postharvest shelf life is typically determined by objective methods that determine the overall appearance, taste, flavor, and texture of the commodity. These methods usually include a combination of sensorial, biochemical, mechanical, and colorimetric (optical) measurements. A recent study attempted (and failed) to discover a biochemical marker and fingerprint methods as indices for freshness.

== Postharvest physiology ==
Postharvest physiology is the scientific study of the plant physiology of living plant tissues after picking. It has direct applications to postharvest handling in establishing the storage and transport conditions that best prolong shelf life.

An example of the importance of the field to post-harvest handling is the discovery that ripening of fruit can be delayed, and thus their storage prolonged, by preventing fruit tissue respiration. This insight allowed scientists to bring to bear their knowledge of the fundamental principles and mechanisms of respiration, leading to post-harvest storage techniques such as cold storage, gaseous storage, and waxy skin coatings.

== Cultural impact ==
The gathering and bringing home of sheaves of corn is a long-standing rural image. In the Old Testament, Joseph has a dream in which he and his brothers "were binding sheaves of grain out in the field, when suddenly my sheaf rose and stood upright, while your sheaves gathered around mine and bowed down to it".

== See also ==
- Post-harvest losses (fruit and vegetables)
- Post-harvest losses (grains)
