= Zeme people =

Zeme
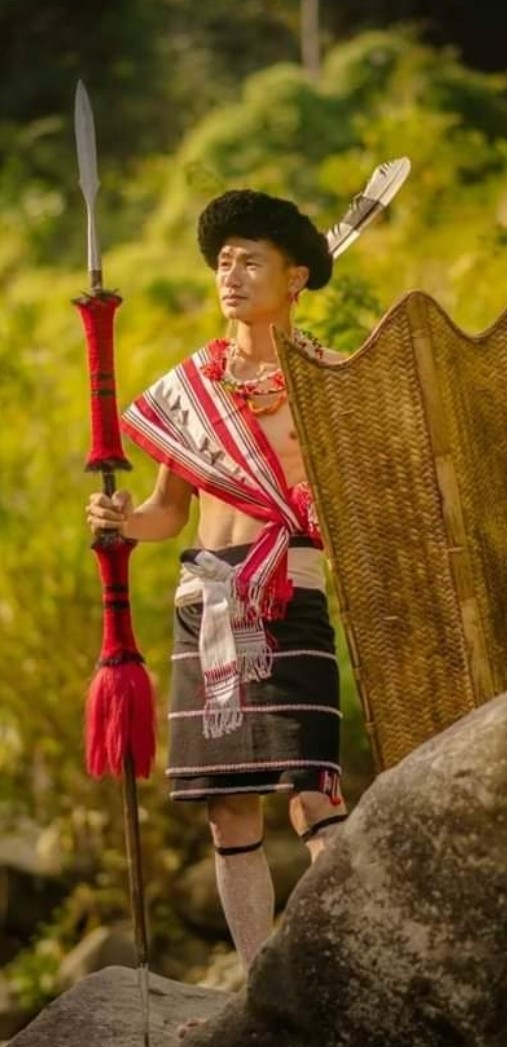
- A young western Zeme man in his traditional attire

Total population
- 70,000 approx. (2011)

Languages
- Zeme language, Mzieme language

Religion
- Christianity, Heraka, and Paupaise

Related ethnic groups
- Rongmei, Liangmai, Inpui, Other Naga people

The Zeme people, also known as the Zeme Nagas, are a Tibeto-Burmese ethnic group from Northeast India. They predominantly inhabit Peren district in Nagaland; Tamenglong district, Senapati district in Manipur and Dima Hasao district (NC hills) in Assam. Jalukie is the main urban centre of the Zeme Naga, serving as a hub for their social, cultural, educational and economic activities in the Peren District of Nagaland. Members of the Zeme Naga play a significant role in the town’s social, economic, and educational development. The Zeme Naga also retain significant landholdings, with several major villages in and around the highly urbanised area of Haflong continuing to be governed under their customary landholding system.

The Zeme Nagas along with the Liangmai, the Rongmei, and the Inpui form the Zeliangrong community residing in the tri-junction of Nagaland, Manipur and Assam.

== Notable people ==
- Neichülie-ü Nikki Haralu, former Indian ambassador
- Armstrong Pame, bureaucrat
- T. R. Zeliang, former Chief Minister of Nagaland
