= Zeliangrong =

Indigenous Naga community found in Northeast India

Zeliangrong people
Languages
- Liangmai · Zeme · Rongmei · Puiron

Religion
- Majority: Christianity; Minority: Tingkao Ragwang Chapriak, Paupaise and Heraka.

Related ethnic groups
- Other Naga tribes

The Zeliangrong people are one of the major Naga communities indigenous to the tri-junction of Assam, Manipur and Nagaland in India. They are the descendants of Nguibou. The term "Zeliangrong" refers to the Zeme, Liangmai, Rongmei, and the Inpui kindred tribes combined. The descendants of Nguibou migrated out of Makuiluangdi village and settled across present-day Manipur, Nagaland, and Assam. The Zeliangrong may be classified as an ethno-cultural entity. The Zeliangrong belong to the larger Naga people and their languages belongs to the Sino-Tibetan family of languages.

== Etymology ==
The ethnonym 'Zeliangrong' is derived from 3 words ZE-LIANG-RONG. ZE from Zeme, LIANG from Liangmai and Rong from Rongmei. It traced back to the three kindred tribes. The three tribes are the Zeme (dwellers of the warmer) or Mejahme (lower region), Liangmai (people of one sector in Makuiluangdi village) the original Northerner; on the other hand the term Rongmei (people who settled in the south/empty land) and finally Inpui (The first syllable ‘IN’ means House, the second syllable ‘PUI’ means Large or Main, and the third syllable ‘RWAN’ means People. Thus, INPUIRWAN translates to people of the Large/Main House).

The word Zeliangrong was first coined on 15 February 1947 at Keishamthong Imphal. The terminology Zeliangrong was coined in coherence with the solidarity movement after India's independence.

== Distribution ==
The Zeliangrong have been living in the present location of their land since time immemorial, in a compact and contiguous geographical setting of approximately 12,000 km^{2} lying between 93 degrees E and 94 degree E longitude and 94.40 degrees and 24 degrees N latitude in N. C Hills of Assam; Peren district of Nagaland; Tamenglong district, Senapati district, Kangpokpi district, Noney district, Kangvai subdivision of Churachanpur district, Jiribam district, Imphal valley, Dima Hasao district and Cachar district.

== Religion ==
The majority of Zeliangrong people follow Christianity.

At present, the non-Christian Zeliangrongs follow three faiths, namely the Heraka, Poupei Chapriak (in Assam) and Tingkao Ragwang Chapriak (in Manipur), all venerating Tingkao Ragwang (Tingwang in short), the supreme deity of the Zeliangrong pantheon.

== Subgroups ==
=== Liangmai ===
The Liangmais are a sub-tribe of the Zeliangrong people. Numbering at around 70,000 to 80,000 the Liangmais inhabit the Tamenglong, Senapati, and Kangpokpi districts of Manipur and Peren district of Nagaland. The name Liangmai is construed from two words Kyliang meaning "Sector" and Khatmai meaning "One people. Therefore, "Liangmai" is directly translated as “a group of people from one sector”, referring to a group of people from one segment/sector of Makuiluangdi village. The Liangmai, alongside the Zeme, Ruangmai, Inpui, Maram, and Thangal, were traditionally grouped under the name Hamai, meaning "Descendants of Hang" referring to the progenitor who preceded Nguibou. After the Makuiluangdi dispersal, the unified Hamai population branched off into separate, distinct tribes.

After King Nguibou's reign, his successor Kading took over as the King of Makuiluangdi and the Liangmai people. Kading had five sons: Karangbou, Mazangdin, Ntangbou, Sunghungbou, and Singbabou. While the four elder brothers migrated to a village named Kuilong, the youngest son, Singbabou, remained in Makuiluangdi and succeeded him as the next ruler. After dispersing from Makuiluangdi, the Liangmais organized into independent villages lacking any centralized leadership. Every village was governed by its own Chawang/Nampao (King), who held power until he died or abdicated, after which his youngest male succeeded him.

Like the Mizos with their Pasalṭha title, the Liangmais and the other Zeliangrong tribes grant honorific titles to distinguished men. The highest rank in the Zeliangrong system is Liangtuang, bestowed upon warriors who excel in warfare and are also celebrated for Chaliuraobo which means helping people in various ways both in their own villages and far beyond their own villages; Hungenang and Kaihuii are notable examples. The Last recognised Liangtuang was Pandun from Luangreng village in the 1940s. The second-highest rank, Charii-chagou, is awarded strictly for exceptional skill in warfare, examples of warriors holding such title are Ramkhommang, Nginbonnang, Mazatlennang, Khenzinnang, and Rengsunnang.

=== Zeme ===
The Zeme are a sub-tribe of the Zeliangrong community, with a population of roughly 150,000. They live across several districts in Northeast India, including Peren and Chumoukedima in Nagaland, Tamenglong and Senapati in Manipur, and Dima Hasao in Assam. The term Zeme originates from the Liangmai word Ramzeningmai, which translates to "People of the lower regions." Over time, Ramzeningmai shifted to Azeningmai before eventually becoming Zeme.

Namgang, the eldest child of King Nguibou, departed from Makuiluangdi with his followers and traveled to the Barak Valley, establishing Hereira the very first Zeme village and becoming the progenitor of the Zeme people. From there, the Zeme migrated into the Barail range, expanding their settlements all the way to the Meghalaya border, west of the Barak River, and across the hill ranges overlooking the Cachar Valley. By the end of the 12th century, the first wave of migration and settlement was completed.

=== Rongmai ===
The Rongmai, who number roughly 230,000, are a sub-tribe of the Zeliangrong community. Their population is spread across several regions in Northeast India, including Manipur's Tamenglong, Noney, Kangpokpi, Bishnupur, Imphal West and Churachandpur districts, as well as the Peren district in Nagaland and the Cachar district in Assam. Etymologically, the name "Rongmai" evolved from the Liangmai term Maruangmai, which means People who migrated to uninhabited land."

The Rongmai people were led by Rembang, the youngest son of King Nguibou. Rembang and his followers departed from Makuiluangdi and ventured south into territories that were completely uninhabited at that time. Over time, Rembang's descendants continued this southward migration, eventually expanding their reach all the way to the Champhai district in Mizoram and Chinland in Myanmar.

=== Inpui ===
The Inpui people are a sub-tribe of the Zeliangrong community. They number between 20,000 to 30,000 and inhabit Noney and Kangpokpi district of Manipur. They are the smallest of the Zeliangrong kindred tribes. The name Inpuiruan is derived from the Inpui word ‘IN’ meaning House and the second syllable ‘PUI’ meaning Large or Main, and the third syllable ‘RUAN’ means People. Therefore, Inpuiruan translates to "People of the Large/Main House."

== History ==
The Zeliangrong people migrated out of Makhel (the sacred origin point of the Tenyimi people) and established a settlement called as Ramtingkabin. Ramtingkabin was a depression situated between two parallel steep cliffs. From the depression if one looks up between the steep cliffs the vision is so dim except for the sight of the sky. For this reason the settlement was called as ‘Ramtingkabin’ (No vision except that of the sky). After establishing Ramtingkabin, the ancestors of the Zeliangrong went searching for more suitable land and moved towards the south to establish Chawangphuning after which they migrated to the northeast of Chawangphuning and established Makuiluangdi the sacred village of the Zeliangrong kindred tribes. Makuiluangdi in Lianglad means ‘Large circular hill’. In time, the settlement of Makuiluangdi expanded to 7,777 households. As time passed, people began dispersing outward, establishing villages and settlements across the present-day states of Manipur, Nagaland, and Assam. Nguibou is the progenitor of the Zeliangrong kindred tribes. Nguibou, the king of Makuilongdi village, married a second time because his first wife was initially believed to be unable to bear a son. His second wife gave birth to a boy named Namgang. A few years later, however, his first wife also bore a son, whom they named Kading. The second wife later had another son called Rembang, leaving Nguibou with two wives and three sons. As Nguibou grew old, he was unable to decide which of his sons should inherit the chieftainship. This indecision sparked a succession crisis within the family. The dispute was eventually resolved by Nguibou’s younger brother, Chatiu, who resided in the Koubru range. Handling the matter with great wisdom, Chatiu ruled that Kading had the rightful claim to succeed his father. This decision established the tradition of succession by the youngest son in all Zeliangrong kindred tribes . Although the immediate question of leadership was settled, the ruling caused lasting disunity among the members of the ruling clan. Being disappointed at the judgment of his uncle and father, Namgang along with his band of followers left Makuilongdi and went to Barak valley and settled at Hereira village, the first village of Zeme. The people who stayed back with Kading at Makuilongdi came to be known as Liangmai. Rembang and his followers moved southwards to a barren land came to known as the Ruangmai (Rongmei). The ancestors of the Ruangmai moved to the south and settled at the western hills and southern hills of present-day Manipur. The Ruangmai (Rongmei) people migrated in various directions, establishing several settlements south of the Irang River. These newly founded villages including Nriangluang, Changdai, Kaikao, Nungnang, Ganglon Namthan, Khoupum, and Montha eventually grew into prosperous villages. Historically, the Ruangmai inhabited territories much further south of their current homeland, extending as far as the Changphai (or Champhai) region of present-day Mizoram. Evidence of their past presence remains in the form of ruined settlements known as Mirongmun, derived from Mirong or Milong, the Lushai term for the Ruangmai. Additionally, oral tradition states that the legendary folk hero Gairemnang traveled as far as Tedim in Myanmar, where he established a village named Duidimluang.

== See also ==
- Zeme Naga
- Liangmai Naga
- Rongmei Naga
- Inpui Naga
- Heraka
