= Inpui Naga people =

Inpui
Regions with significant populations
- Manipur

Languages
- Inpui language

Religion
- Christianity

Related ethnic groups
- Zeme, Liangmai, Rongmei other Naga peoples

The Inpui people, also known as the Inpui Naga, are a Tibeto-Burmese indigenous ethnic group of Northeast India.

Some historians and anthropologists have earlier recorded them as Kabui along with Rongmei People. They are recognised as Scheduled Tribes (STs) by the Constitution of India. They mostly inhabit Noney district in the state of Manipur.

== Geographical Location ==
The homeland of the Inpui Naga tribe is located in the western part of Manipur, between the Cachar Hills and the Manipur Valley, covering a stretch of about 40 miles. Situated around 40 km from Imphal, the state capital, it is most accessible via the historic Kangchup–Tamenglong road, which once linked Manipur to the rest of India and earned Haochong, an Inpui settlement, the title 'Western Gate of Manipur.' The region holds strategic importance and shares boundaries with Khundong and Nurarthel in the north, Bhalok and Nagaching in the west, Maranjing and Komren in the east, and Longmai and Khumji in the south. It lies at the eastern edge of Tamenglong district, now within the newly created Noney district, bordering Senapati district.
