= Liangmai people =

Major Naga ethnic group in Northeastern India

Liangmai
Kwoireng, Liyang, Liangmai zat
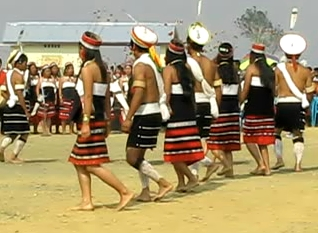
- Liangmai youths performing folk dance

Total population
- 60,000 approx. (2011)

Languages
- Lianglad

Religion
- Majority: Christianity; Minority: Polytheism

Related ethnic groups
- Naga tribes; Zeme; Rongmei; Inpui

The Liangmai people are a Tibeto-Burmese ethnic group that inhabit Nagaland and Manipur states of Northeast India. Their villages are mostly spread across the Peren district in Nagaland and Tamenglong, Senapati, Kangpokpi in Manipur. They are a part of the larger Naga tribes and have a similar language and culture. A majority of the Liangmais practise Christianity while a small section in Tening village of Nagaland still adheres to traditional Heraka religious practices.

== Etymology ==
The word “Liangmai” is a compound word made up of liang + mai. Here, liang is construed as kyliang, meaning a ‘sector in a village’, and mai means people. Thus "Liangmai" best translated as “a group of people from one sector”, probably referring to a group of people from one segment of Makuiluangdi village. Secondly, liang is interpreted as north, which means people from the north. The interpretations are closely connected and possibly accurate as the Liangmais settled in the Northern part of the present Hamai (Zeliangrong or Luangdimai) territory. At the same time, the Liangmai people might be a number of people from the same kyliang or sector in Makuiluangdi village who lived there as the ruler of the land.

== Culture ==
The Liangmai community is known for its diverse cultural traditions, distinct language, and unique social practices, many of which have developed and adapted over a long historical period. Their way of life reflects influences from their ancestral heritage as well as interactions with neighbouring groups, making their cultural identity both deeply rooted and dynamic.

=== Khangchiuky/Liuchiuky (Youth Dormitory) ===
The Khangchiuky (for boys) and Liuchiuky (for girls) were traditional youth dormitories in Liangmai society, where unmarried members of the community lived until marriage. These institutions served as centres for socialisation, discipline, and cultural education. Within the dormitories, young people were trained in oral traditions, customary laws, music, dance, and various crafts, while boys also learned hunting and martial skills. Membership was compulsory, and children were symbolically affiliated with a dormitory from birth. Unlike in some other Naga groups, Liangmai dormitories were often housed in large private homes offered by influential families as a public contribution. The system played an important role in preparing youth for adulthood and preserving the community’s cultural and social structures.

=== Cuisine ===
The diet of the Liangmai community is shaped by local environmental conditions, cultural practices, and religious beliefs. Their food includes a variety of vegetables, fruits, spices, meat, poultry, fish, and edible insects. Rice (Te) serves as the primary staple, supplemented by two types of millet, locally called Thathiu and Tasi/Tasiu, which are especially consumed during the lean season. Historically, roasted or boiled maize, roots, and millets were common staple foods. Boiling is the preferred cooking method for both red and white meats, often combined with locally available leafy spices and roots, while roasted meat is occasionally consumed in lean periods. Edible oils are rarely used, and cooking generally involves simple preparation without elaborate processes. Smaller catches, such as fish, insects, or small game, were traditionally consumed within the family, whereas larger animals were typically sold to support household expenses. Among the traditional foods of the Liangmai Nagas are Nziangdui and Tesiugan. Nziangdui is a distinctive chutney made from fermented mustard, notable for its black colour and strong flavour. Tesiugan is a curry prepared with rice, typically cooked with chicken or other meats, and combined with vegetables.

=== Festivals ===
==== Chaga Ngee ====
Chaga Ngee, celebrated by the Liangmai community on October 30–31, is a major festival emphasising purification, reconciliation, and thanksgiving. The festival involves communal feasting, cultural performances, and the sharing of resources, and it is observed with strict rules to maintain social and spiritual purity. Traditionally lasting five days, Chaga Ngee begins with “Chamimalapbo” (the Day of Welcome), during which youths gather in dormitories with elders to sing, share food, and engage in playful exchanges. The second day, “Npengkiapbo,” involves shooting at a human-shaped totem while invoking ancestral names, with specific outcomes associated with different targets. The third day, “Gadi” or “pon malaungbo,” focuses on sharing meals and resources in a grand feast attended by the entire community. The final day, “chagapabo,” is reserved for women and the elderly, who consume leftover food in observance of on domestic chores until all leftovers are finished. Participants, both married and unmarried, follow rules to maintain purity, including preparing their own dishes and avoiding contact with food prepared by the opposite gender. The festival is believed to ensure bountiful harvests, reduce conflicts, and promote community well-being.

== Liangmai Clans ==
Liangmai oral tradition speaks of two primary ancestral clans: Pamai, and Newmai (also spelled Niumai). These two ancestral clans gave rise to many sub‑clans over generations through branching lineages and migrations. The ancestral homeland is said to be around the area historically called Makuilongdi, considered the cradle of the Zeliangrong, including Liangmai people. Migration stories tell of movements due to inter-tribal conflicts, resource needs, or spiritual revelations, leading to dispersion into present-day Nagaland and Manipur. Clans are often associated with specific totems or symbols, such as animals or birds, which hold spiritual significance and regulate social customs. For example, the Green pigeon is linked with Pamai clan and the Newmai with the Drongo. Liangmai clans are exogamous — one cannot marry within their own clan, promoting alliances and social cohesion across clans. Elders and clan leaders play a vital role in settling disputes, conducting rituals, and safeguarding customary law.

- Sub-Clans:

Malangmai, Thiumai, Daimai, Abonmai, Marenmai (Marianmai), Parinmai, Rimai, Dirinamai, Jiunamai, Nkhpuinamai, Chawangduimai, Chawang, Dichongdamai, Mantriaktamai, Makuimai, Singbengmai, Ijiutaa Daimai, Inkingtaamai, Rikangmai, Rampuinahmai, Dunahmai, Kainahmai, Chalunmai, Poitamai, Nkenahmai, Buijanahmai, Bungnahmai, Nroumai, Nchatmai, Wijunahmai, Matrairepuinahmai, Charigoutamai, Genpuinahmai, Charenahmai, Dinahmai, Khiuliangmai, Kalengtamai, Moitamai, Tingnahmai, Penmai, Maijintamai, Wisontamai, Jongtamai, and Namditamai.

== Gallery ==
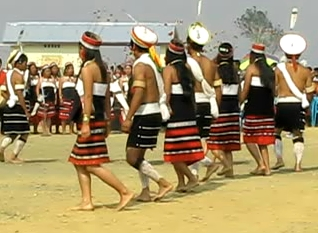
Liangmai youths performing folk dance during Road Show in Peren, Nagaland.

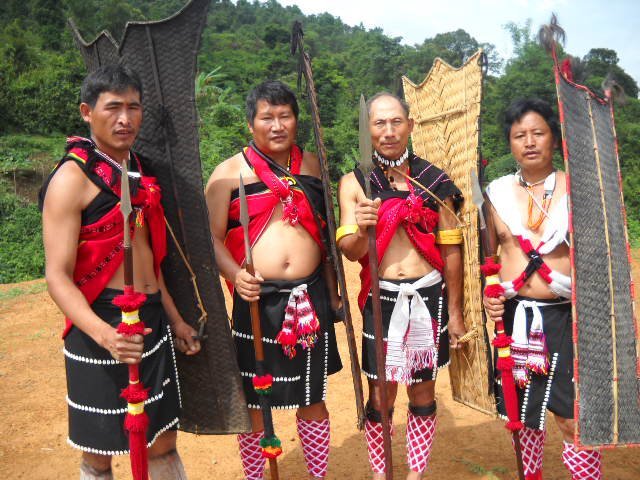
Liangmai men wearing wartime attire.

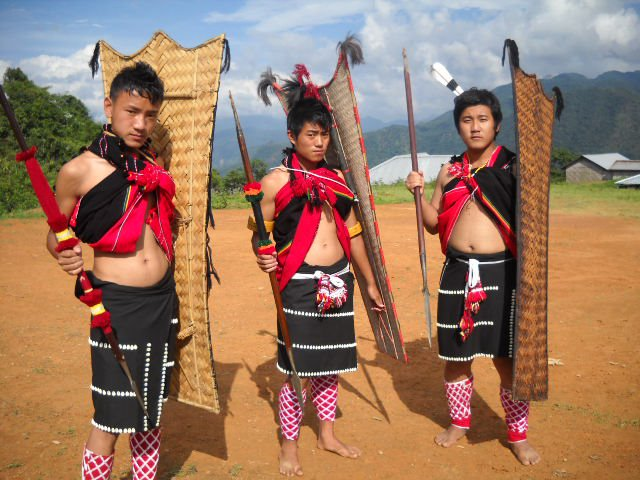
During our forefathers' time young boys were trained the techniques of war in the Morung (Khangchiu in Lianglad).

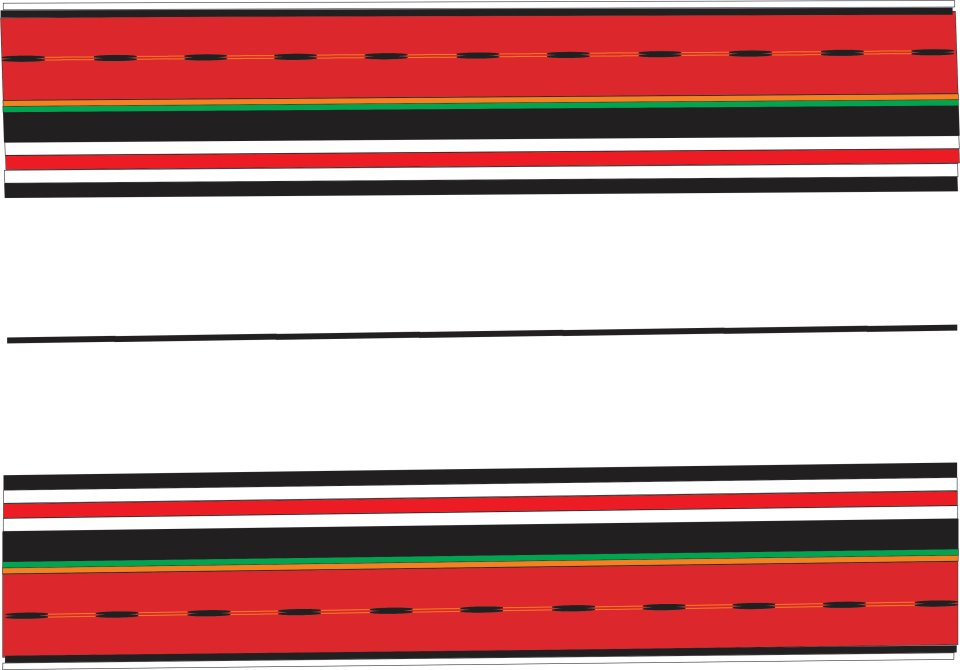
This Liangmai traditional shawl called the Ngumthuakphai is worn by unmarried boys and girls during festivals and other important occasions.
