= Rongmei people =

Sino-Tibeto indigenous ethnic group in the northeast India

Rongmei
- Rongmei/Kabui woman

Total population
- 188,800 (2011 Census)

Regions with significant populations
- Northeast India

Languages
- Rongmei language

Religion
- Christianity, Folk Religion (Tingkao Ragwang Chapriak, Poupei Chapriak, Heraka).

Related ethnic groups
- Zeme, Liangmai

The Rongmeis (also known as Kabui) are one of the Naga ethnic communities of North-East India. They are recognised as a scheduled tribe in the Constitution of India.

They share similarity with their kindred tribes of Zeme, Liangmai and Inpui, which together are known as Zeliangrong. Some historians and anthropologists have earlier recorded them as Kabui along with Inpui people.

== Festival ==
The Gaan-Ngai festival (post-harvest festival) is celebrated annually between December and January. It follows the lunar calendar and is celebrated on the 13th day of the Wakching or Gaan Ngai buh. It is celebrated to worship the Supreme God Haipou Tingkao Ragwang.

== Rebellion ==
During the Colonial period, under the leadership of Haipou Jadonang Malangmei and his successor Rani Gaidinliu Pamei, the Rongmeis along with other Zeliangrong tribes rebelled against British rule in the 1930s.

== See also ==
- Hill tribes of Northeast India
- Tamenglong
- Zeliangrong
- List of Naga tribes
