= Jalukie =

- Town
- Location in Nagaland
- Coordinates: 25.647518°N 93.669324°E
- Country: India
- Region: Northeast India
- State: Nagaland
- District: Peren District

Population (2011)
  - Total: 8,706

Languages
  - Official: English
  - Major languages: Zeme
- Time zone: UTC+5:30 (IST)
- PIN: 797110
- Website: nagaland.nic.in

Jalukie is a town in the Peren District of the Indian state of Nagaland. According to the 2011 census of India, Jalukie has a population of 8,706. Jalukie is a planned urban area developed to serve the growing urban population in Nagaland.

== Geography ==
The land is surrounded by hills and mountain ranges on its periphery, forming almost similar to a shape of a big lake. Some of the rivers of Jalukie are Ntaureu, Mpeuki, Mungleuki, Keleireu, Nkokreu, Tepaki, Buijaireu, Tecauki, etc. Though all these are rain-fed rivers, some flows all year round. Many of these rivers are tributaries of the Dhansiri River.

== Demographics ==
Jalukie is inhabited majorly by Zeliangrong ethnic group. The term Jalukie indicates the name of a place, while Jalukieme refers to its people. Jalukie Pumling is used to describe exclusively to the original landowners of Jalukie. The term Jalukie is also used to describe the villages and town as a whole that falls under the aegis of Jalukie Pumling Nko (JPN). The JPN formed by the Pumling (landowners) is the apex body of the Jalukie jurisdiction under customary setup and landownership rights. The main festival of Jalukie is Mlei-Ngyi celebrated in the month of March, while Kwakpo celebrated in the month of October also has its significance.

The word Jalukie has been derived from the phrase Jene Lulo Lenkie meaning field area of Jene. It would seem that the literal translation has been modified in the course of time. The categorization of the settlers of Jalukie as Jalukie Pumling dates back to the early 1960s. On the verge of establishing a town in their jurisdiction, the elders of Jalukie before departing from the hills to the plain areas for resettlement felt the need to identify themselves as Jalukie Pumling, so that they can trace back their roots to Jalukie Village. Thus by definition Jalukie Pumling meant those individuals whose ancestors resettled from present Old Jalukie to surrounding areas in the early 1960s.

Some of the present settlements established under Jalukie Village are as follows:

1. Old Jalukie: Lower Khel / sector ‘C’ established in 1983. Sector ‘B’ under Upper Khel established in 1988. While the original settlement in Old Jalukie remained as Sector ‘A’ of Upper Khel
2. Samziuram: established 12 March 1966
3. Jalukie Town: established 1 April 1966
4. New Jalukie: established 12 February 1967
5. Nkokreu: established 11 July 1978
6. Jalukiekam: established: 17 November 1971
7. Jalukie B: established 24 February 1972
8. Jalukie Sangtam: established 8 May 1991
9. Jalukielo: established 21 June 1998
10. Jalukieram: established 10 December 2000
11. Kejanglwa: established under Lunget (household tax) system
12. Jalukie Jangdi: established on 6 June 2006
13. Jalukie Rongkaidai : established in 2016
14. Jalukie Pungchi : established on 12 October 2017

The Jalukie Pumling consists of the following Khels:

1. Heneingpeiname
2. Mpomchame
3. Nringpeiname
4. Nchatsume
5. Hiekhaname
6. Hemangme

Under JPN, there are subordinate bodies such as Jalukie Students Union (JSU); Jalukie Pumling Youth Organization (JPYO); Jalukie Pumling Mipui Organization (JPMO); and Jalukie Hekuina Gutdi.

== Culture ==
=== Festival ===
Festivity brings happiness, cheerfulness, brotherhood and excitement among tribesman. The Zeliang Nagas are no exception and have a number of festivals. The date, custom and rite may vary from village to village. For a uniform celebration of the festival, the Government of Nagaland has set aside 11 March, Vide No. GAB-11/15/91 (B) Dt. Kohima, 15 November 1991, for ‘Mlei Ngyi’ festival, which is celebrated by Zeliang people.

Prelude to the festival:

Hengyi-sa: The village high priest/harbinger conveying all good wishes to his community proclaims the arrival of festive season and sets the date of the festival to enable for preparation of self, food, drinks, dresses etc. Preparatory agricultural activities such as jungle clearing for current jhum and millet cultivation in fallow jhum areas are supposed to have been completed well ahead of the commencement of the event.

Kecimpu: This is an act of self-cleansing and purification ahead of the festival and involves cleaning of clothes and belongings, seed treatment so that seeds sown after the festival are vigorous and healthy.

Mlei zautau: This involves preparation of local rice brew especially meant to be served to the traditional fire makers.

Main festival events:

Day 1;

Mlei-teu: This event marks the commencement of Mlei-ngyi festival and is usually performed by the clan headman (kizeu-pei) of each dormitory, who will make fire by using strands of bamboo (mlei-ria) and bamboo fine fibres and keep the flame burning until culmination of the festival. During the entire festive period, the clan headman (kizeu-pei) will abstain from having any indulgence with wife and family and maintain a separate hearth.

Heteu hebak dap/Leidi: This event involves slaughter of domestic animals meant for food during festival in different dormitories. The evening also witnesses engaged couples being invited to their respective would-be-in-laws for dinner and blessing; boy invited to would-be-wife's home and vice versa and this dinner invitation by village folks usually continues during the entire festive period. All male members usually with their cup of beer and meat prepared from home, while entering their dormitory usually make a yodel as "Au....whi... ketyei kesak ngyi, kehing kelia ngyi... aki, mlia pungla..." which means "festival of food and drinks, festival of prosperity and longevity..." Dreams were also interpreted the next day.

Day 2;

Rodi: At dawn, some adult male members from the two major clan viz. Heu and Hau, foray into the jungle to make wooden totem (Herie) for each clan which is usually a 6–8 feet long wooden plank split and shared one each from a single trunk. The plank is then brought to the village with each clan carrying their respective wooden totem and placed on a clean predestined location in front of each dormitory. Then all male members in traditional attires gather to yodel around the totem thence proceed to the playground for traditional games and sports like Hedau (kicking the plank), Heram (high jump), Tsugi (shot put). Hesim (long leap), Hejo (long jump), Hepo (wrestling) etc. This event usually witnesses wide participation and stiff competition from capable youngsters and the event marks the best athletes of the village for the year. The sporting event culminates with a traditional yodel (Nroh) by male members congregated around the arena (Hejo-pung).

Day 3;

Bamsak: The day is significant with families sharing Hengyi-dom (festival food package) to family members living out of the village. The evening hours are occupied with male members visiting female dormitories and calling them out by name and (having verbal) exchanging pleasantry. Interpretation of dreams follows the next day.

Day 4;

Tsingpo nsa: The day is marked with different clan collecting firewood and piling in their respective dormitories and the headmen serving dormitory wine to members. In the evening hours, female dormitory members, usually sing soulful ballets and visit male dormitories and perform traditional Heba-lia (finger identification), Heriang teu (tug-of-war) and Tsingpo-nsa (firewood snatch).

Day 5;

Zausa: Merry making in respective dormitories prevails.

Day 6;

Gwangnim: The final day in which the clan headman (Hegwangme) douses the Mlei-mi (festival fire). Members of the female dormitories collect Kemniebi (sticky rice) from respective households and after cooking share it with male dormitories as well as with female member including young girls.

Post festival events:

Regapa: The event after the festival when male members begin agricultural practices of burning their jhum fields and in the process any wild animals and birds killed or captured are gifted to female dormitories. Female members collect meat from their homes and cook in dormitories. Left over pieces of meat and bones (Hailodum nsa) are collected by younger boys.

Gaipia mna: Boys and girls together have recreation and merry making with bride-to-be by singing soulful ballets and conundrum. The bride-to-be along with friends from her dormitory selects a married man to lead during Nta (traditional dances) and gives him mouthful of salt and wine.

Mtim: A day for facilitating and solemnizing traditional marriage ceremonies akin to Christian holy marriages and involves marriage feast for the entire village folks

== Economy ==
Jalukie Town is one of the fastest-growing towns in Nagaland, serving almost all basic and essential needs from groceries to building materials for areas far and near. Its agricultural produce are also popular across Nagaland.

Jalukie has a suitable climate for various types of agriculture and animal rearing.

== Conservation Effort ==
Jalukie is known for its stand against forest destruction and animal poaching. Several villages under Jalukie have taken stringent measures against the burning of forests, hunting and other forest destruction activities which could compromise the status quo of the forest and its inhabitants. The people of Jalukie has found recognition from its state and the country for their excellent performance towards protection of flora and fauna. Some of their achievements are - The Old Jalukie Biodiversity Joint Management Committee was adjudged winner of Indian Biodiversity Award 2014, Governor's award 2015 and Government of Nagaland Forest Department Award 2015. They have also been featured as the best practice under Bonn Challenges and India published by IUCN. They have declared a total of 370 hectares as Community Biodiversity Reserve and taken steps to impose a total ban on jhum cultivation, hunting, logging and tree felling within the declared area. What is more unique about it, is that the villagers are in full participation mode.

Jalukie Students' Union (registered as society under Nagaland. unique registration ID 'NL/2014/0082651') has also been awarded Best Performance Award’ by NBDA in 2016, for their outstanding performance towards bamboo development in their forest reserve.

== Education ==
Educational Institutions in Jalukie:

1. College for Veterinary Science and Animal Husbandry
2. St. Xavier College
3. Government Higher Secondary School
4. St. Xavier Higher secondary School
5. Jawahar Novodaya Vidyayala
6. Ibaung Thou Memorial High School
7. Christian High School
8. Baptist High School
9. Chawang High School
10. Barail Valley High School,
11. Baptist High School, Jalukie 'B'
12. Government High School, Jalukie 'B'
