= List of museums in India =

India has a diverse network of museums that preserve and showcase the country's rich cultural, historical, archaeological, artistic, scientific and natural heritage. These institutions house collections of historical artefacts, sculptures, paintings, manuscripts, coins, textiles, archaeological discoveries, tribal traditions, technological developments and objects of national and regional significance. Museums in India range from national and state museums to specialised institutions, galleries, memorial museums and science centres, reflecting the country's varied historical periods, regional traditions and cultural communities. Located across different states and union territories, they play an important role in education, research, heritage conservation and public engagement. This list presents notable museums in India, organised geographically by state and union territory, along with their locations and, where available, years of establishment.

This is a list of notable museums in India by state and union territory:

== List ==
=== Andhra Pradesh ===
Name	City/Town	State/Territory	Year Established
Archaeological Museum, Amaravati	Amaravati	Andhra Pradesh	
Bapu Museum	Vijayawada	Andhra Pradesh	1887
Chandavaram Buddhist site	Chandavaram, Prakasam district	Andhra Pradesh	1980
Bhagwan Mahavir Government Museum	Kadapa	Andhra Pradesh	1982
Telugu Samskruthika Niketanam	Visakhapatnam	Andhra Pradesh	2015
Victory at Sea War memorial	Visakhapatnam	Andhra Pradesh	1971
Kursura Submarine Museum	Visakhapatnam	Andhra Pradesh	2002
TU 142 Aircraft Museum	Visakhapatnam	Andhra Pradesh	2017
Visakha Museum	Visakhapatnam	Andhra Pradesh	1991

=== Arunachal Pradesh ===
Name	City/Town	State/Territory	Year Established
Jawaharlal Nehru Museum	Itanagar	Arunachal Pradesh	1980

=== Assam ===
Name	City/Town	State/Territory	Year Established
Shankardev Kalakshetra	Guwahati	Assam	2024
Assam State Museum	Guwahati	Assam	1940
Mayong Central Museum and Emporium	Mayong	Assam	2002

=== Bihar ===
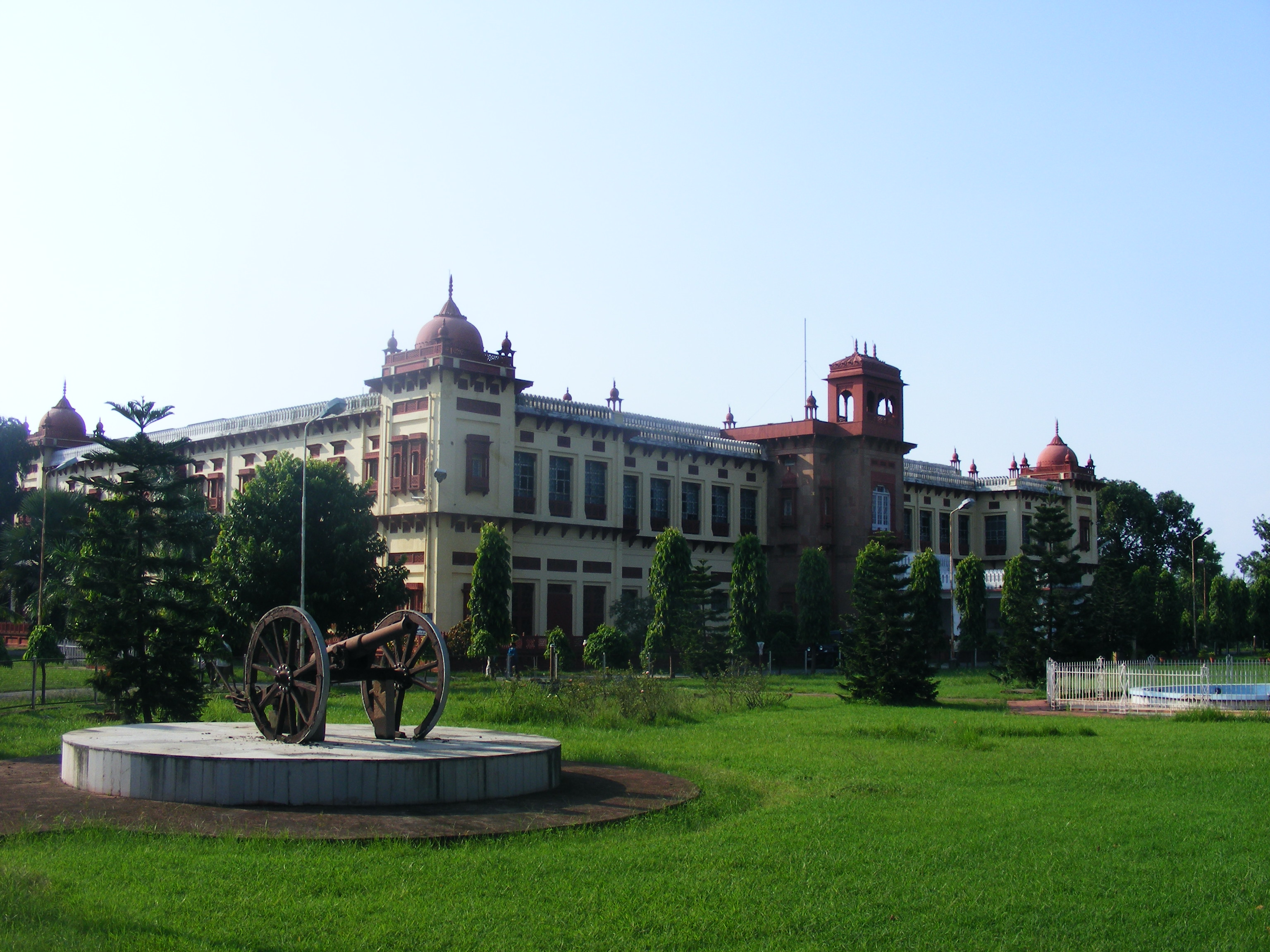
Patna Museum, Patna, established in 1917.

Name	City/Town	State/Territory	Year Established
Bhartiya Nritya Kala Mandir	Patna	Bihar	1963
Bihar Museum	Patna	Bihar	2015
Jalan Museum	Patna	Bihar	1919
Patna Museum	Patna	Bihar	1917
Chandradhari Museum	Darbhanga	Bihar	1957
Rajendra Smriti Sangrahalaya	Patna	Bihar	1963
Shrikrishna Science Centre	Patna	Bihar	1978
Gandhi Sangrahalaya	Patna	Bihar	1967

=== Chandigarh ===
Name	City/Town	State/Territory	Year Established
Government Museum and Art Gallery	Chandigarh	Chandigarh	1968

=== Chhattisgarh ===
Name	City/Town	State/Territory	Year Established
Mahant Ghasidas Memorial Museum, Raipur	Raipur	Chhattisgarh	1875

=== Goa ===
Name	City/Town	State/Territory	Year Established
Goa Chitra Museum	Benaulim	Goa	2010
Big Foot Museum	Loutolim	Goa	
Ashvek Vintage World	Nuvem	Goa	2004
Archaeological Museum and Portrait Gallery	Old Goa	Goa	
Museum of Christian Art	Old Goa	Goa	
Goa Science Centre	Panaji	Goa	
Goa State Museum	Panaji	Goa	1977
Museum of Goa	Pilerne	Goa	2015
Naval Aviation Museum (India)	Vasco da Gama	Goa	1998

=== Gujarat ===
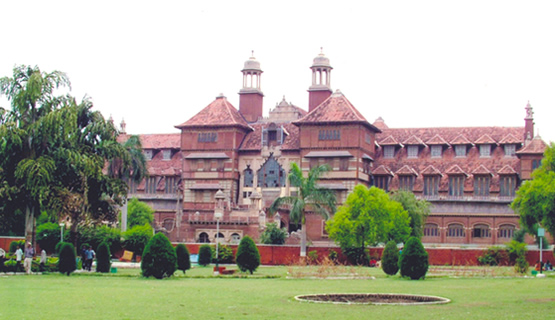
Baroda Museum & Picture Gallery in Vadodara, established in 1894.

Name	City/Town	State/Territory	Year Established
Calico Museum of Textiles	Ahmedabad	Gujarat	1949
Conflictorium	Ahmedabad	Gujarat	2013
Gandhi Smarak Sangrahalaya	Ahmedabad	Gujarat	
Gujarat Science City	Ahmedabad	Gujarat	
Lalbhai Dalpatbhai Museum	Ahmedabad	Gujarat	1984
Sardar Vallabhbhai Patel National Memorial	Ahmedabad	Gujarat	1980
Sanskar Kendra	Ahmedabad	Gujarat	1954
Swaminarayan Museum	Ahmedabad	Gujarat	2011
Baroda Museum & Picture Gallery	Vadodara	Gujarat	1894
Maharaja Fateh Singh Museum	Vadodara	Gujarat	
Kirti Mandir	Porbandar	Gujarat	
Watson Museum	Rajkot	Gujarat	1888
Kaba Gandhi No Delo	Rajkot	Gujarat	
Kutch Museum	Bhuj	Gujarat	1877
Aina Mahal	Bhuj	Gujarat	
Prag Mahal	Bhuj	Gujarat	
Smritivan Earthquake Memorial and Museum	Bhuj	Gujarat	2022
Saraswati Mandir	Surat	Gujarat	
Science Centre, Surat	Surat	Gujarat	
Shristhal Sangrahalay	Siddhpur	Gujarat	2017

=== Haryana ===
Name	City/Town	State/Territory	Year Established
Jahaj Kothi Zonal Museum	Hisar	Haryana	
Rewari Railway Heritage Museum	Rewari	Haryana	2002
Dharohar Museum	Kurukshetra	Haryana	
Heritage Transport Museum	Taoru	Haryana	2013
Rakhigarhi Indus Valley Civilisation Museum	Rakhigarhi	Haryana	

=== Himachal Pradesh ===
Name	City/Town	State/Territory	Year Established
Shivalik Fossil Park	Sirmaur	Himachal Pradesh	
Library of Tibetan Works and Archives	Dharamsala	Himachal Pradesh	

=== Jammu & Kashmir ===
Name	City/Town	State/Territory	Year Established
Dogra Art Museum	Jammu	Jammu and Kashmir	1954
SPS Museum	Srinagar	Jammu and Kashmir	1898

=== Jharkhand ===
Name	City/Town	State/Territory	Year Established
Ranchi Science Centre	Ranchi	Jharkhand	
State Museum Hotwar	Ranchi	Jharkhand	
Tribal Research Institute and Museum	Ranchi	Jharkhand	
Sanskriti Museum & Art Gallery	Hazaribagh	Jharkhand	

=== Karnataka ===
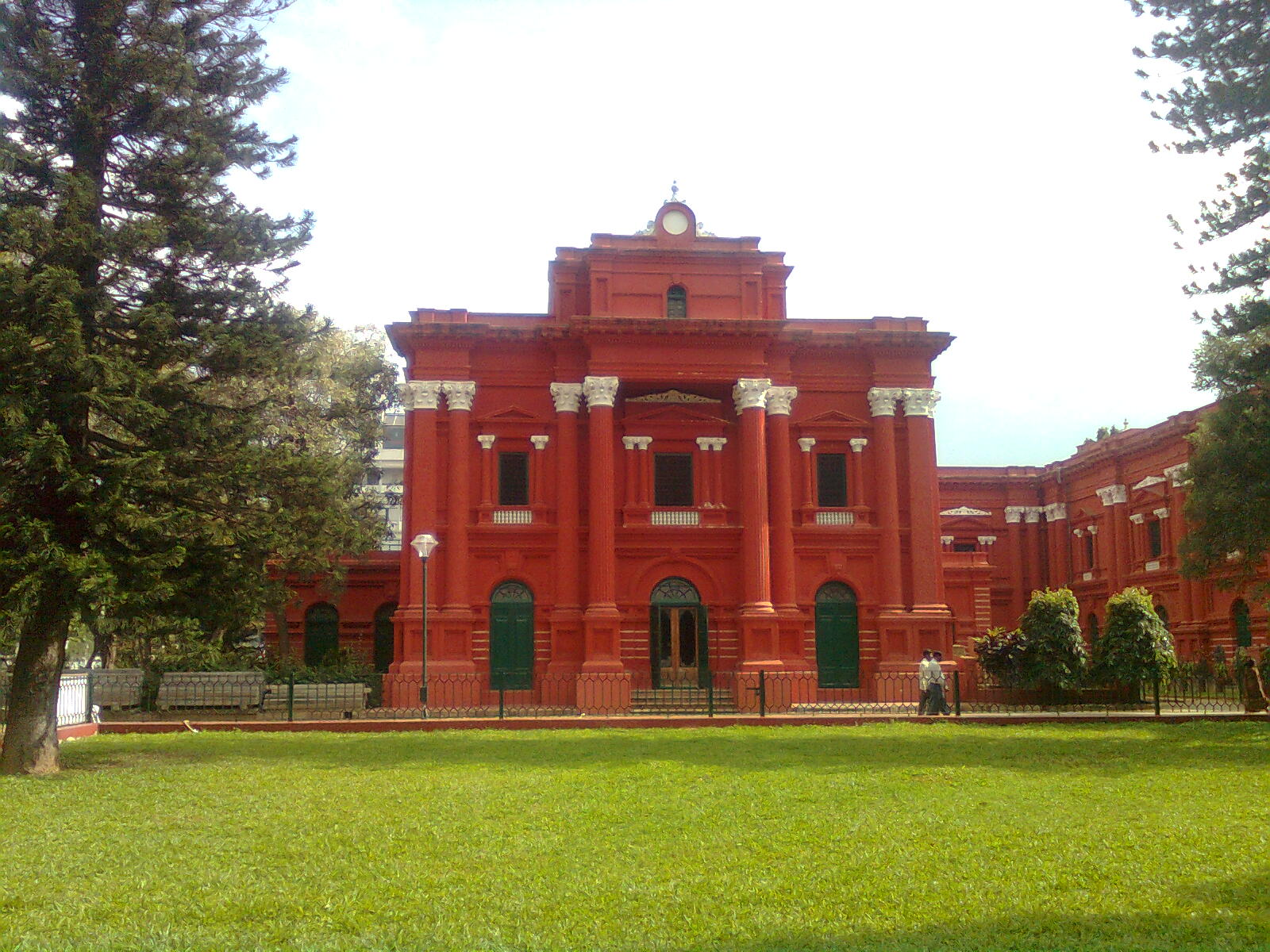
Government Museum, Bengaluru, established in 1865.

Name	City/Town	State/Territory	Year Established
Archaeological Museum, Vijayapura	Bijapur		1892
Government Museum, Bengaluru	Bengaluru	Karnataka	1864
National Gallery of Modern Art, Bangalore	Bengaluru	Karnataka	2009
Visvesvaraya Industrial and Technological Museum	Bengaluru	Karnataka	1962
Karnataka Chitrakala Parishath	Bengaluru	Karnataka	1960
HAL Aerospace Museum	Bengaluru	Karnataka	
Venkatappa Art Gallery	Bengaluru	Karnataka	
Museum of Art & Photography (MAP)	Bengaluru	Karnataka	2015
Aloyseum	Mangalore	Karnataka	1913
Srimanthi Bhai Memorial Government Museum	Mangalore	Karnataka	1960
Manjusha Museum	Dharmasthala	Karnataka	1989
Regional Museum of Natural History	Mysuru	Karnataka	1995
Railway Museum, Mysore	Mysuru	Karnataka	
Folklore Museum	Mysuru	Karnataka	

=== Kerala ===
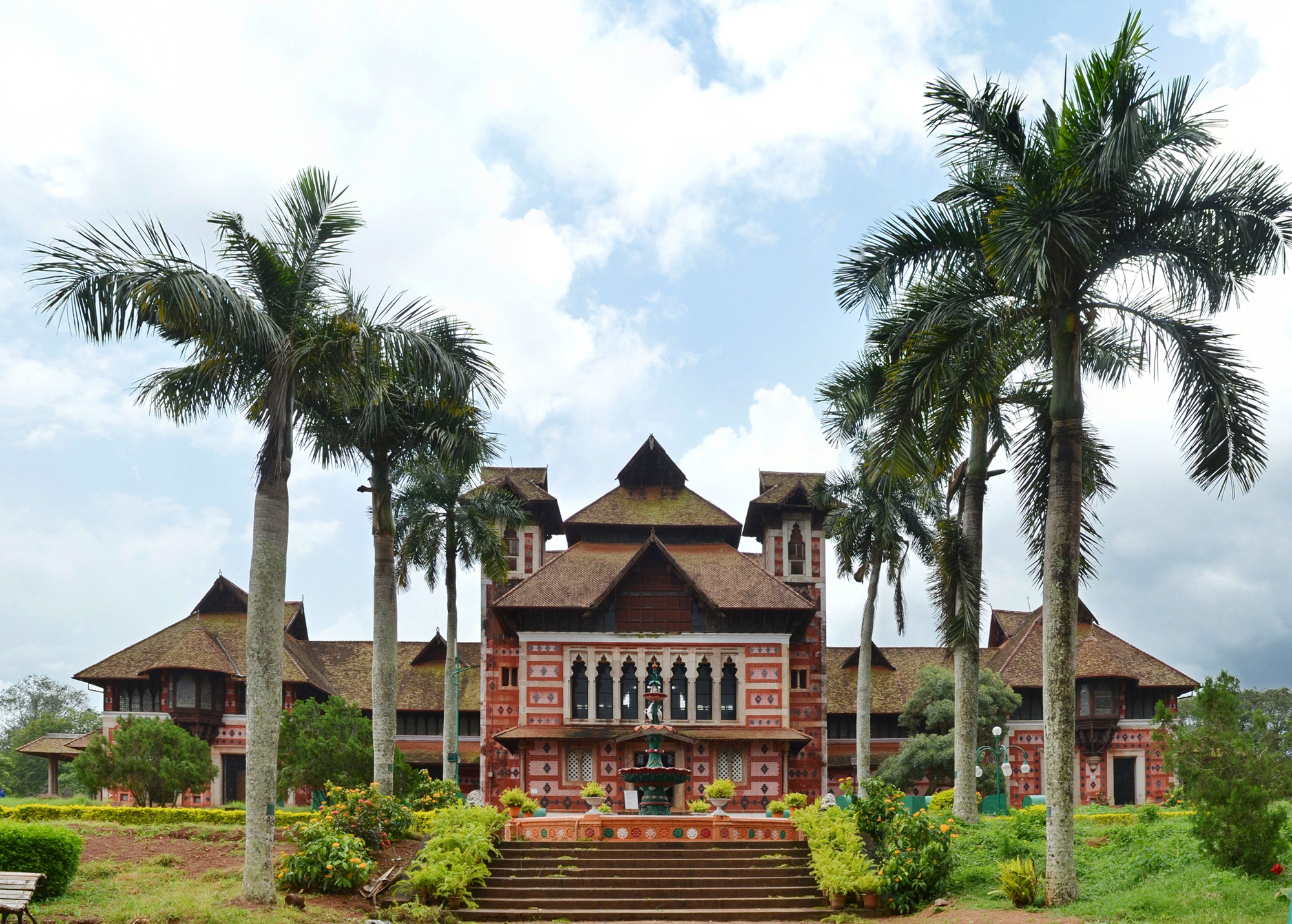
Napier Museum in Thiruvananthapuram, established in 1855.

Name	City/Town	State/Territory	Year Established
Archaeological Museum, Thrissur	Thrissur	Kerala	
Mural Art Museum	Thrissur	Kerala	
Vallathol Museum	Thrissur	Kerala	
Vaidyaratnam Ayurveda Museum	Thrissur	Kerala	
Indo-Portuguese Museum	Kochi	Kerala	1910
Kerala Soil Museum	Thiruvananthapuram	Kerala	
Arakkal Museum	Ayikkara	Kerala	
Teak Museum	Nilambur	Kerala	
8 Point Art Cafe	Kollam	Kerala	
Sardar Vallabhbhai Patel Police Museum	Kollam	Kerala	
Pazhassi Raja Archaeological Museum	Kozhikode	Kerala	1976
Krishnapuram Palace	Kayamkulam	Kerala	
Indian Business Museum	Kozhikode	Kerala	
Museum of Kerala History	Kochi	Kerala	
Napier Museum	Thiruvananthapuram	Kerala	1857
Keralam - Museum of History and Heritage	Thiruvananthapuram	Kerala	
Kerala Science and Technology Museum	Thiruvananthapuram	Kerala	
Wayanad Heritage Museum	Ambalavayal	Kerala	
Hill Palace	Thrippunithura	Kerala	
Revi Karunakaran Memorial Museum,	Alappuzha	Kerala	
PhotoMuse Museum of Photography	Thrissur	Kerala	2014
Art Museum of Love	Kodakara	Kerala	2024

=== Ladakh ===
Name	City/Town	State/Territory	Year Established
Munshi Aziz Bhat Museum of Central Asian and Kargil Trade Artefacts	Kargil	Ladakh	2004

=== Madhya Pradesh ===
Name	City/Town	State/Territory	Year Established
Indore Museum	Indore	Madhya Pradesh	1929
Bharat Bhavan	Bhopal	Madhya Pradesh	1982
Museum of Mankind(Manav Sangrahalaya)	Bhopal	Madhya Pradesh	1977
State Museum, Bhopal	Bhopal	Madhya Pradesh	1903
Tribal Museum Bhopal	Bhopal	Madhya Pradesh	2013
Regional Museum of Natural History, Bhopal	Bhopal	Madhya Pradesh	1997
Regional Science Centre, Bhopal	Bhopal	Madhya Pradesh	1995
Maharaja Chhatrasal Museum	Dhubela	Madhya Pradesh	
Gujari Mahal Archaeological Museum	Gwalior	Madhya Pradesh	
Sanchi Archaeological Museum	Sanchi	Madhya Pradesh	1919
Vidisha Museum	Vidisha	Madhya Pradesh	

=== Maharashtra ===
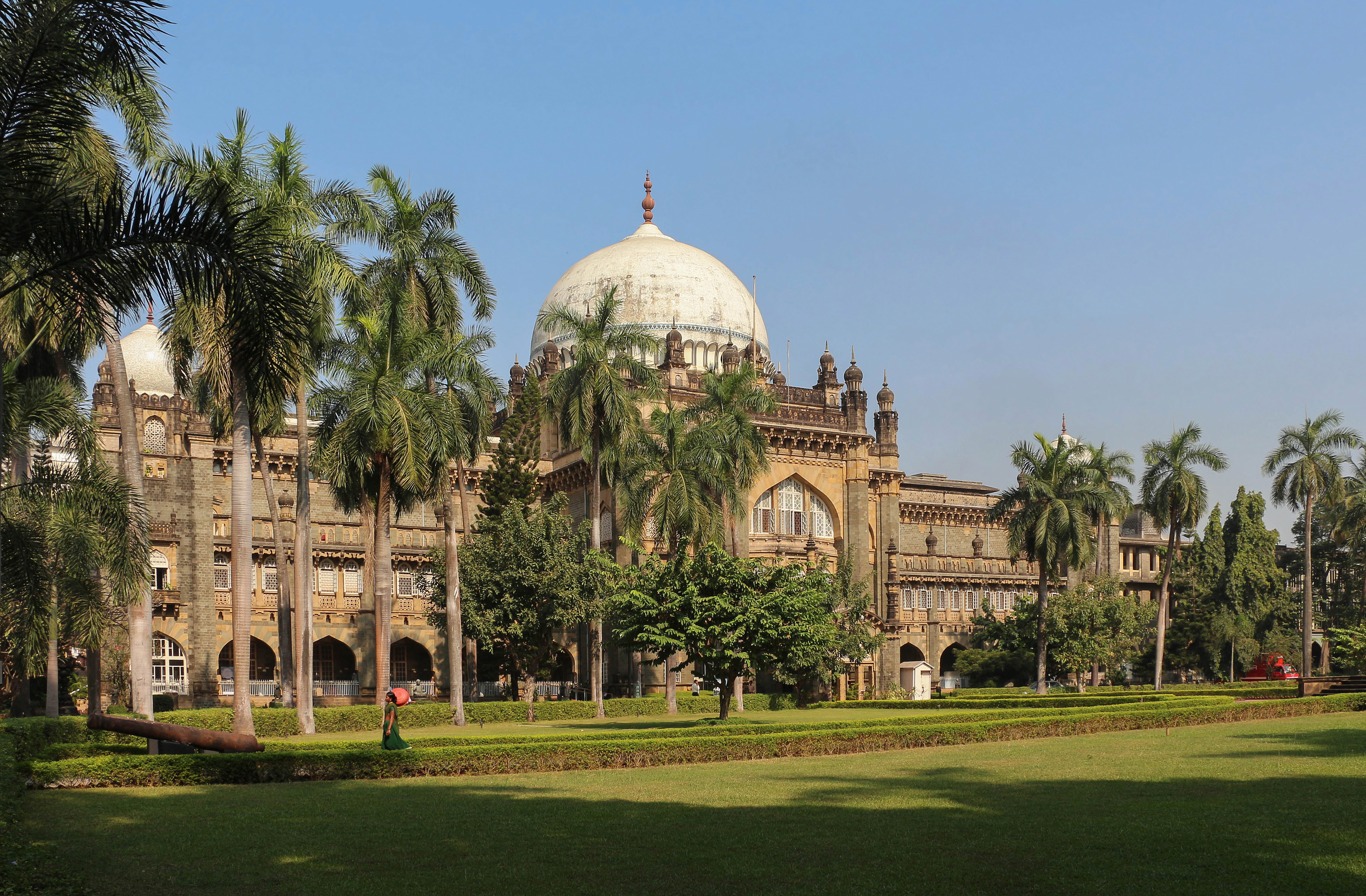
Chhatrapati Shivaji Maharaj Vastu Sangrahalaya (formerly Prince of Wales Museum) in Mumbai, established in 1922.

Name	City/Town	State/Territory	Year Established
Bhau Daji Lad Museum	Mumbai	Maharashtra	1872
National Gallery of Modern Art, Mumbai	Mumbai	Maharashtra	1996
Mani Bhavan	Mumbai	Maharashtra	
Chhatrapati Shivaji Maharaj Vastu Sangrahalaya	Mumbai	Maharashtra	1922
Nehru Science Centre	Mumbai	Maharashtra	
Cowasji Jehangir Hall	Mumbai	Maharashtra	1996
INS Vikrant	Mumbai	Maharashtra	1943
Nagpur Central Museum	Nagpur	Maharashtra	1863
Ballard Bunder Gatehouse	Mumbai	Maharashtra	1920
Piramal Museum of Art	Mumbai	Maharashtra	2016
Joshi's Museum of Miniature Railway	Pune	Maharashtra	
Mahatma Phule Museum	Pune	Maharashtra	
Raja Dinkar Kelkar Museum	Pune	Maharashtra	
Antarang – Sex Health Information Art Gallery	Mumbai	Maharashtra	
Cavalry Tank Museum, Ahmednagar	Ahmednagar	Maharashtra	
Indian Institute for Research in Numismatic Studies	Nashik	Maharashtra	
Siddhagiri Gramjivan Museum (Kaneri Math)	Kolhapur	Maharashtra	
Chhatrapati Shivaji Maharaj Museum of Indian History	Pune	Maharashtra	
Raman Science Centre	Nagpur	Maharashtra	
Shree Chhatrapati Shahu Museum	Kolhapur	Maharashtra	
Sarmaya Arts Foundation	Mumbai	Maharashtra	2015
Pragati Aerospace Museum	Ozar	Maharashtra	2001

=== Manipur ===
Two hiyang hiren watercraft flanked by two tanna hi watercraft, inside the Hijagang Museum in the Kangla Fort, Imphal, opened to the public in 2013

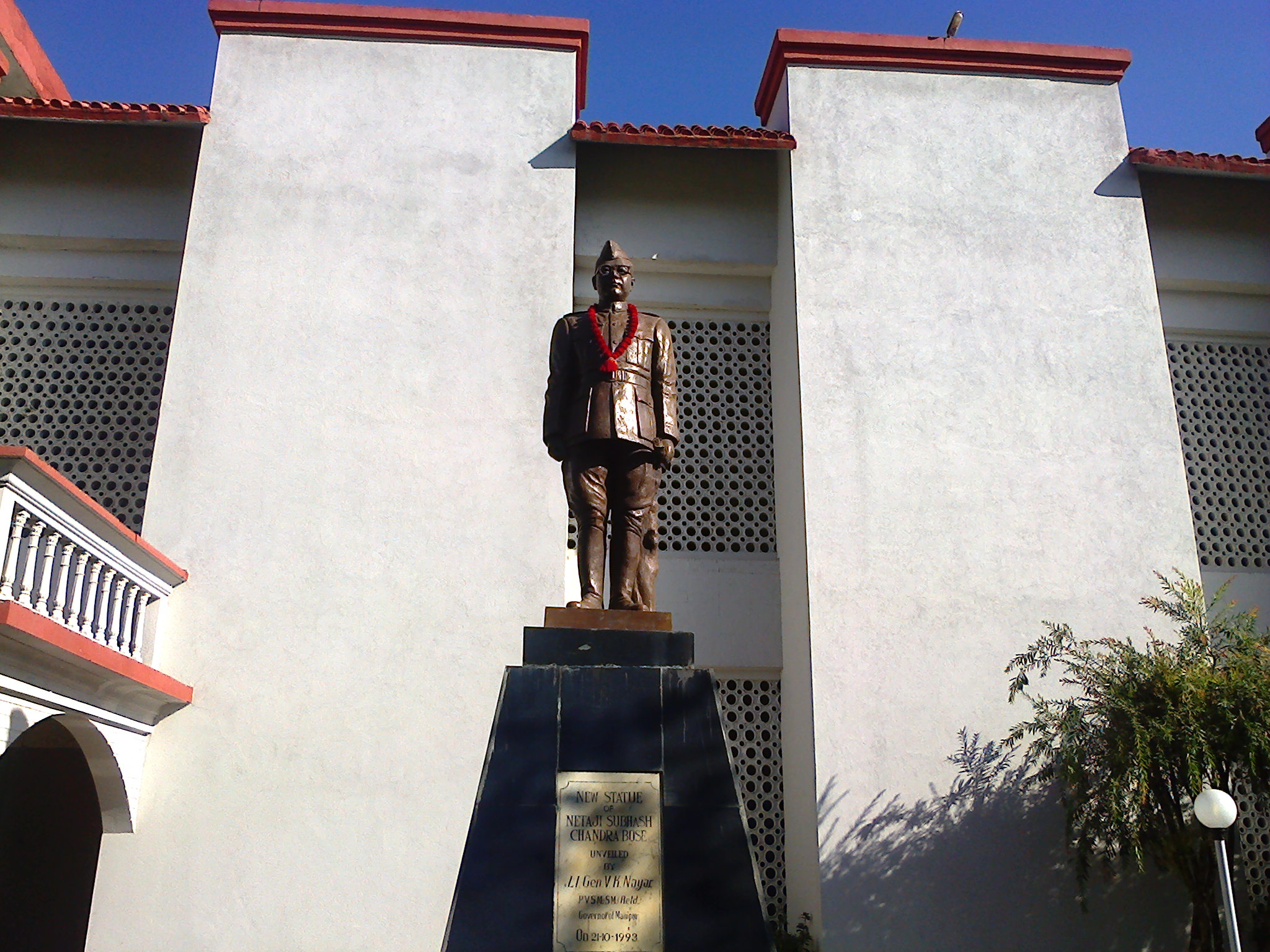
A statue of Netaji Subhashchandra Bose standing in the Indian National Army War Museum (INA War Museum) inside the INA Memorial Complex in Moirang, established in 1985

Name	City/Town	District	Year Established
Archaeological Museum, Kangla	Imphal	Imphal West District	2017
Hijagang	Imphal	Imphal West District	2013
Imphal Peace Museum	Imphal	Imphal West District	2019
Indian National Army War Museum (INA War Museum)	Moirang	Bishnupur district	1985
Kangla Memento Museum	Imphal	Imphal West District	2018
Kangla Museum	Imphal	Imphal West District	
Loktak Folklore Museum	Thanga	Bishnupur district	2016
Manipur State Museum	Imphal	Imphal West District	1969
Sekta Archaeological Living Museum	Sekta	Imphal East district	1991

=== Mizoram ===
Name	City/Town	State/Territory	Year Established
Mizoram State Museum	Aizawl	Mizoram	

=== Nagaland ===
Name	City/Town	State/Territory	Year Established
Nagaland State Museum	Kohima	Nagaland	1970

=== Delhi ===
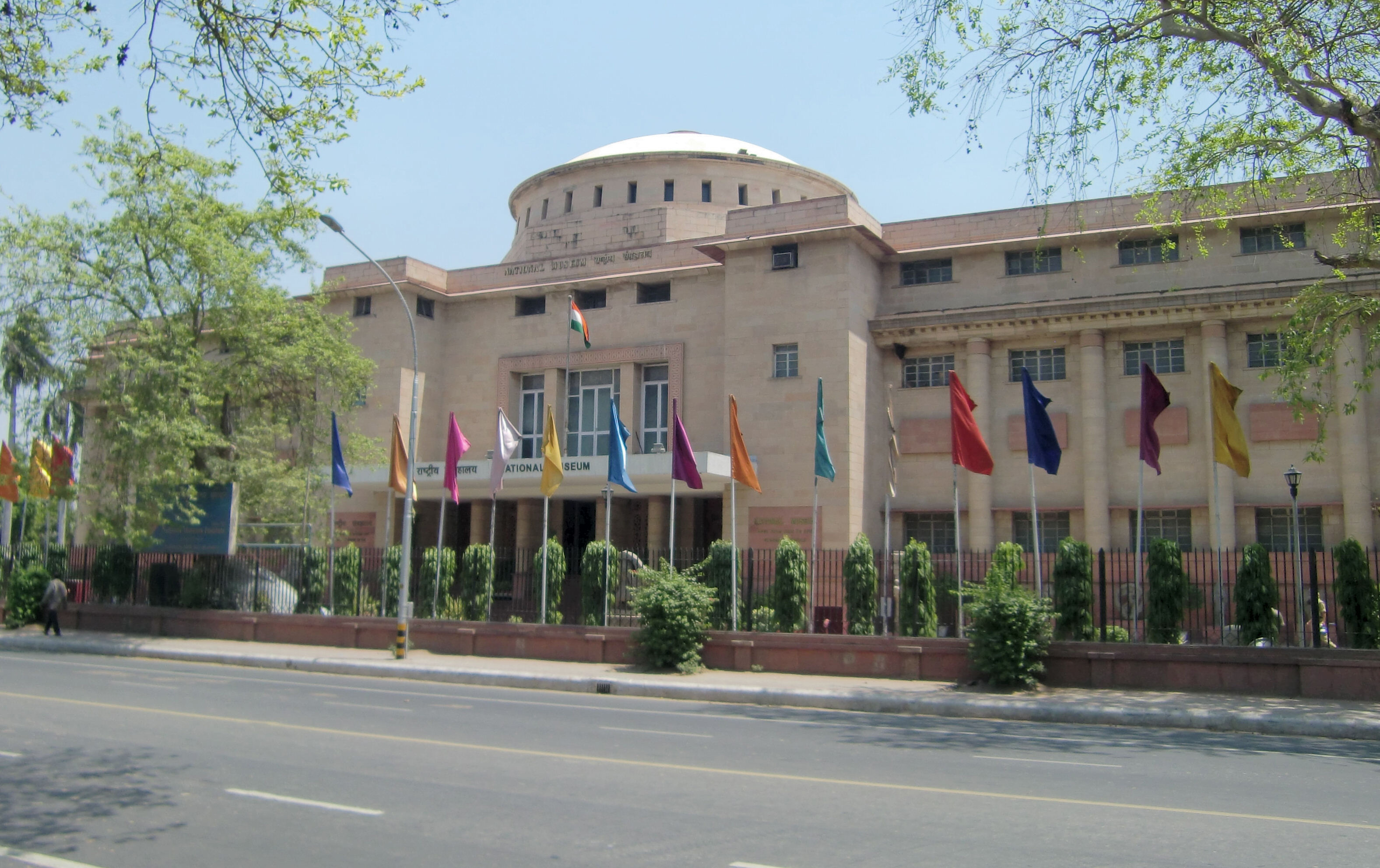
National Museum, New Delhi, established in 1949, is one of the largest in the country with a collection 2,00,000 plus artifacts.

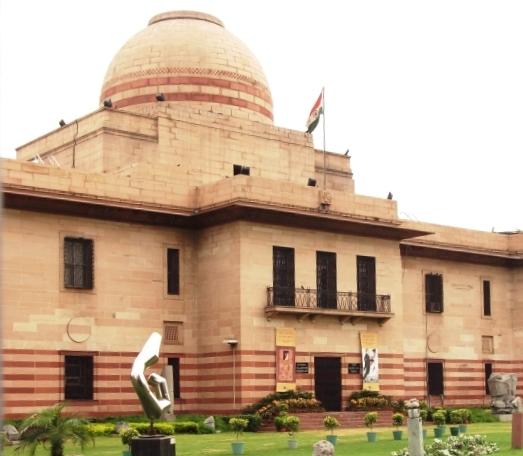
National Gallery of Modern Art, Delhi, established in 1954, at the Jaipur House.

Name	City/Town	State/Territory	Year Established
National Museum	Delhi	National Capital Territory of Delhi	1949
Sanskriti Kendra Museum	Delhi	National Capital Territory of Delhi	
National Science Centre	Delhi	National Capital Territory of Delhi	
National Handicrafts and Handlooms Museum	Delhi	National Capital Territory of Delhi	
Kiran Nadar Museum of Art	National Capital Territory of Delhi	Delhi	2010
Eternal Gandhi Multimedia Museum	Delhi	National Capital Territory of Delhi	
Indian Air Force Museum, Palam	Delhi	National Capital Territory of Delhi	
Madame Tussauds Delhi	Delhi	National Capital Territory of Delhi	
National Museum of Natural History	Delhi	National Capital Territory of Delhi	
National Rail Museum	Delhi	National Capital Territory of Delhi	1977
National Gallery of Modern Art	Delhi	National Capital Territory of Delhi	1954
Teen Murti Bhavan	Delhi	National Capital Territory of Delhi	1930
Gandhi Smriti	Delhi	National Capital Territory of Delhi	
Nehru Memorial Museum & Library	Delhi	National Capital Territory of Delhi	
Parliament Museum	Delhi	National Capital Territory of Delhi	
National Gandhi Museum	Delhi	National Capital Territory of Delhi	
Sulabh International Museum of Toilets	Delhi	National Capital Territory of Delhi	
Shankar's International Dolls Museum	Delhi	National Capital Territory of Delhi	
Red Fort Archaeological Museum	Delhi	National Capital Territory of Delhi	
Kiran Nadar Museum of Art	Delhi	National Capital Territory of Delhi	2010

=== Odisha ===
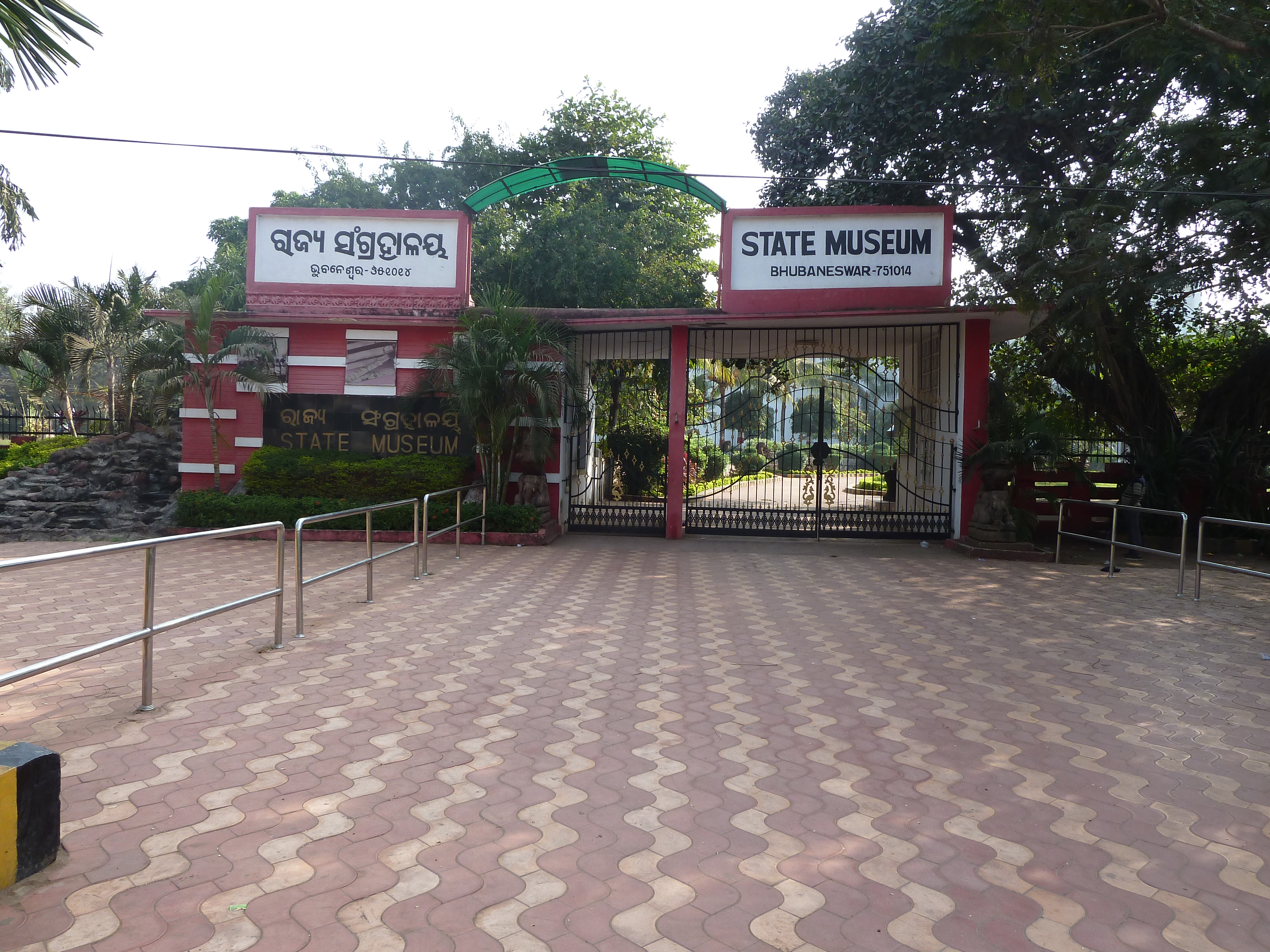
Odisha State Museum, established in 1932.

Name	City/Town	State/Territory	Year Established
Odisha State Museum	Bhubaneshwar	Odisha	1932
Tribal Research Institute Museum	Bhubaneshwar	Odisha	
Regional Museum of Natural History, Bhubaneswar	Bhubaneshwar	Odisha	

=== Puducherry ===
Name	City/Town	State/Territory	Year Established
Pondicherry Museum	Puducherry	Puducherry	

=== Punjab ===
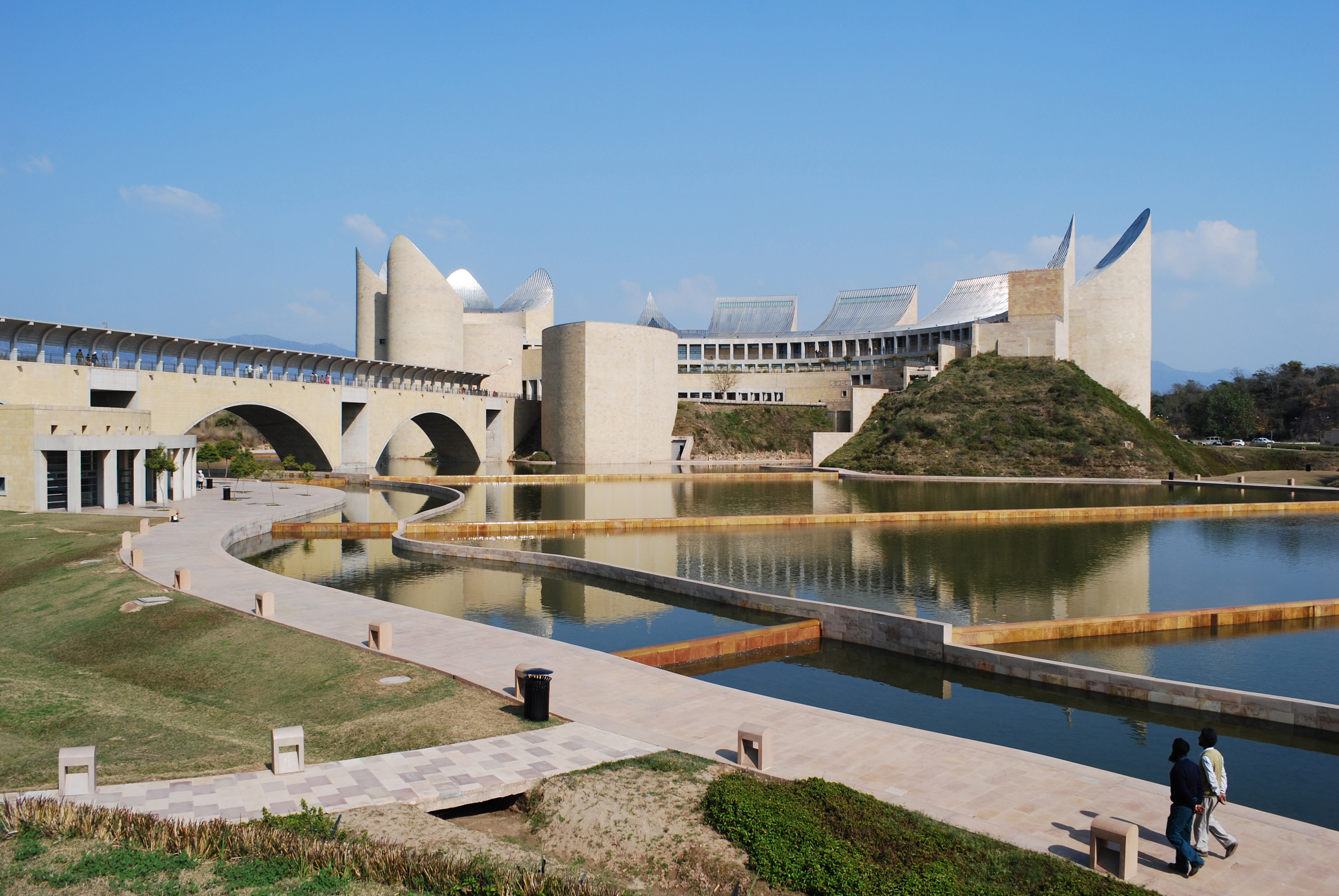
Virasat-e-Khalsa, established in 2011, showcases the history of sikhism.

Name	City/Town	State/Territory	Year Established
Virasat-e-Khalsa	Anandpur Sahib	Punjab	2011
National Institute of Sports	Patiala	Punjab	
Sanghol Museum	Sanghol	Punjab	
Partition Museum	Amritsar	Punjab	2017
Sikh Ajaibghar	Balongi	Punjab	
Gobindgarh Fort	Amritsar	Punjab	

=== Rajasthan ===
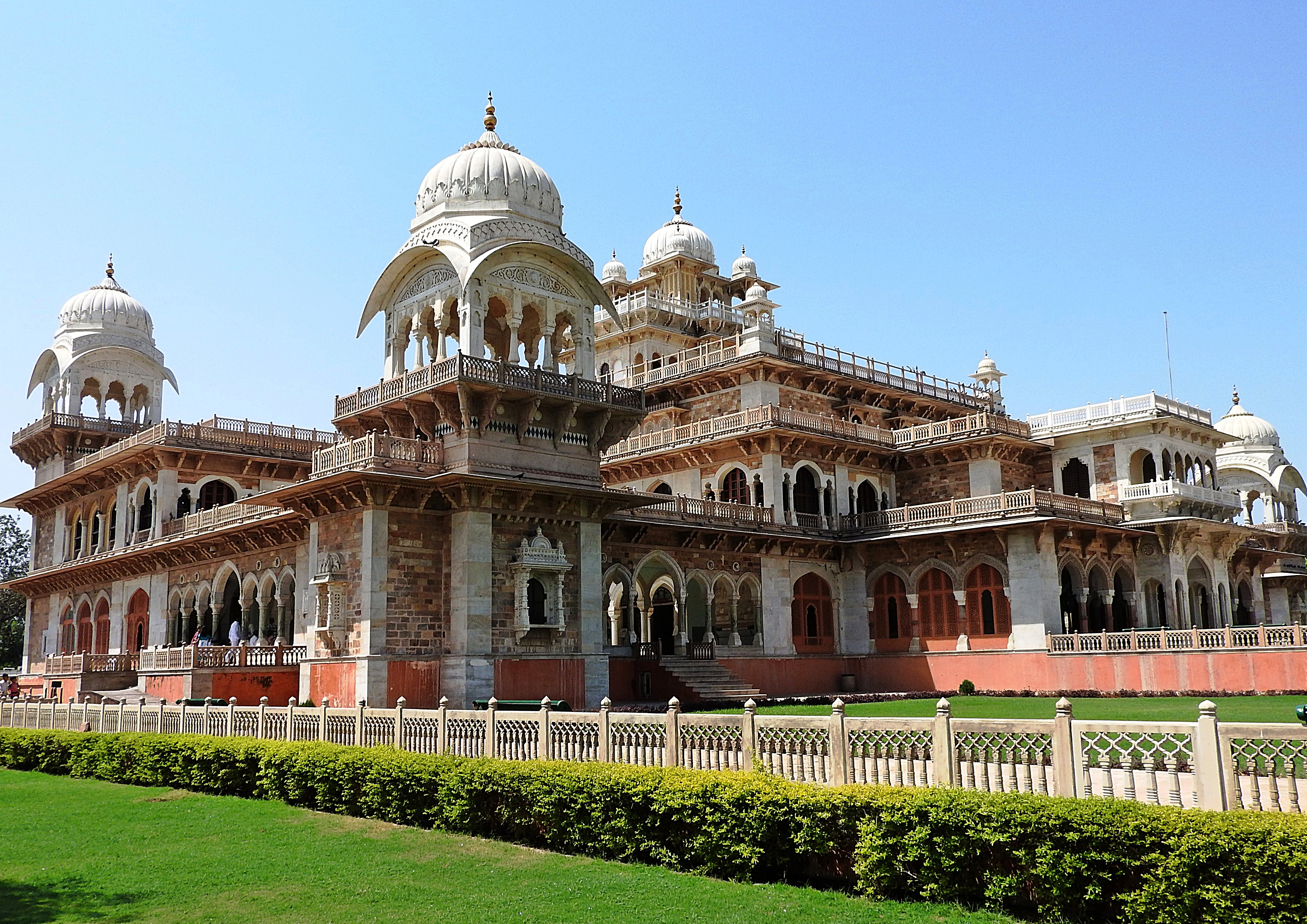
Albert Hall Museum in Jaipur, established in 1887.

Name	City/Town	State/Territory	Year Established
Jawahar Kala Kendra	Jaipur	Rajasthan	
Albert Hall Museum	Jaipur	Rajasthan	1887
City Palace, Jaipur	Jaipur	Rajasthan	
City Palace, Udaipur	Udaipur	Rajasthan	
Umaid Bhawan Palace	Jodhpur	Rajasthan	
Jaisalmer War Museum	Jaisalmer	Rajasthan	
Vintage and Classic Car Museum	Udaipur	Rajasthan	2000
Rajiv Gandhi Regional Museum of Natural History	Sawai Madhopur	Rajasthan	2007
Sardar Government Museum	Jodhpur	Rajasthan	1936

=== Sikkim ===
Name	City/Town	State/Territory	Year Established
Namgyal Institute of Tibetology	Gangtok	Sikkim	

=== Tamil Nadu ===
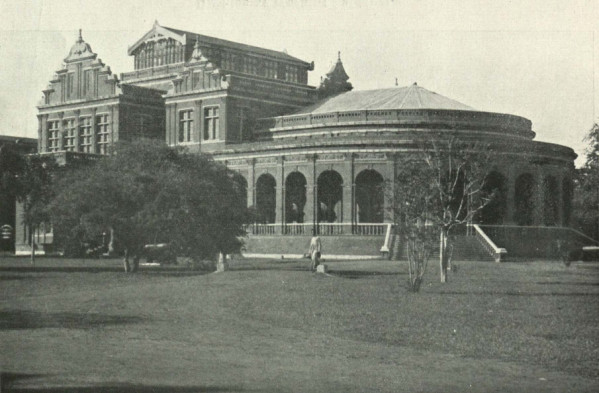
Government Museum, Chennai complex by Willie Burke, c. 1905, established in 1851, is the second oldest museum in India.

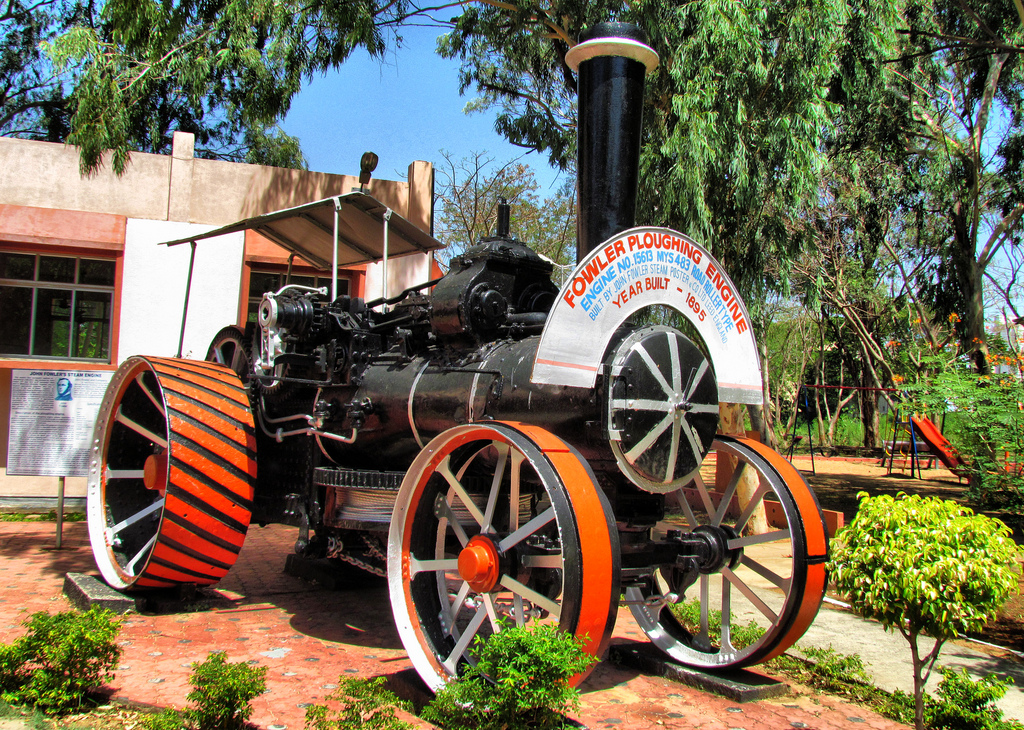
Chennai Rail Museum, established in 2002.

Name	City/Town	State/Territory	Year Established
Chennai Railway Museum	Chennai	Tamil Nadu	2002
Government Museum, Chennai	Chennai	Tamil Nadu	1851
Vivekanandar Illam	Chennai	Tamil Nadu	
Gandhi Memorial Museum	Madurai	Tamil Nadu	
Gass Forest Museum	Coimbatore	Tamil Nadu	
Saraswathi Mahal Library	Thanjavur	Tamil Nadu	
Government Museum	Cuddalore	Tamil Nadu	
Government Museum, Karur	Karur	Tamil Nadu	
Government Museum, Pudukkottai	Pudukkottai	Tamil Nadu	
Government Museum, Tiruchirappalli	Tiruchirappalli	Tamil Nadu	
Railway Heritage Centre	Tiruchirappalli	Tamil Nadu	
Mahakavi Bharathi Memorial Library	Erode	Tamil Nadu	

=== Telangana ===
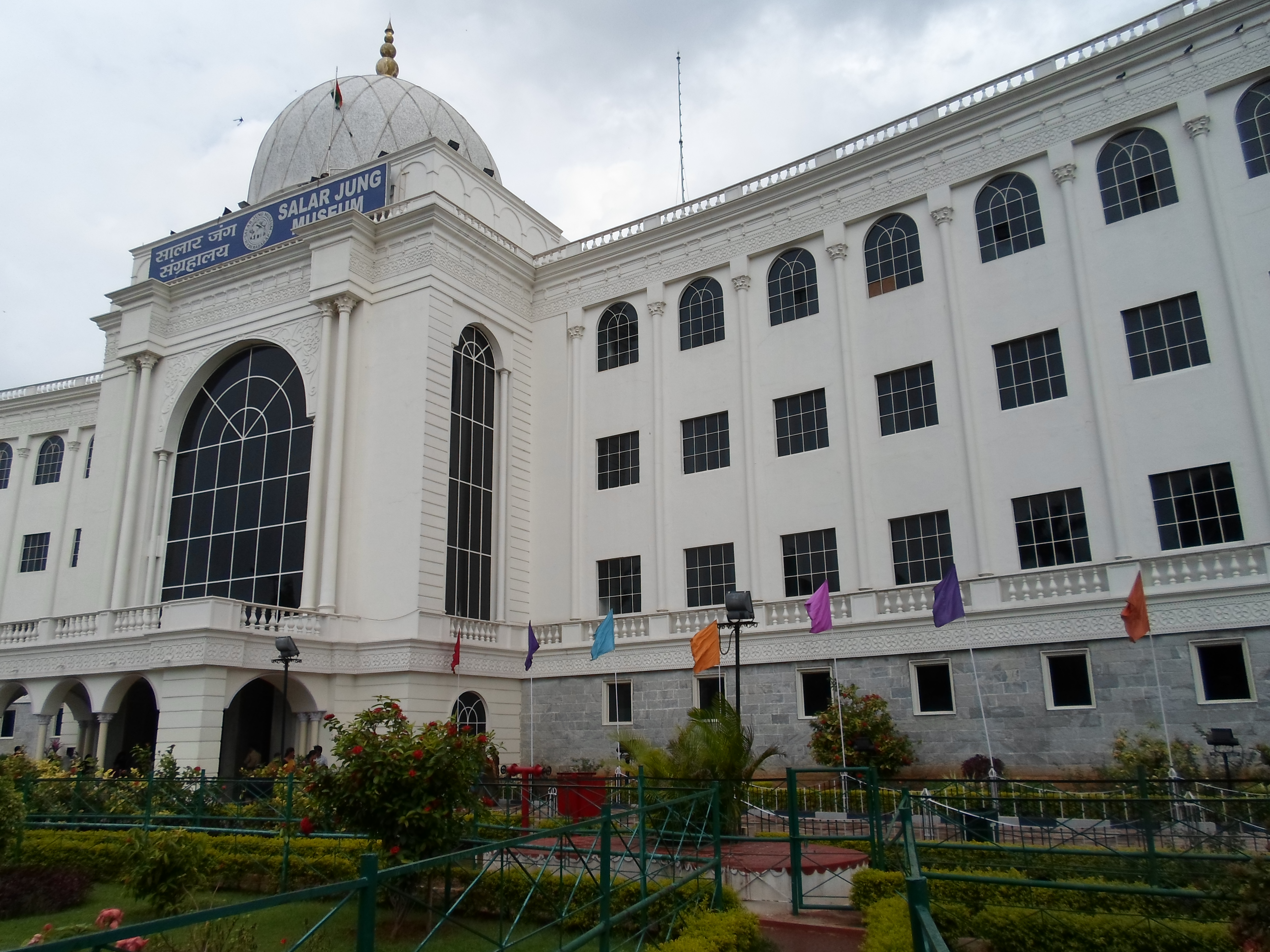
Salarjung Museum in Hyderabad, established in 1951, is the largest collection of antiques of an individual in the world.

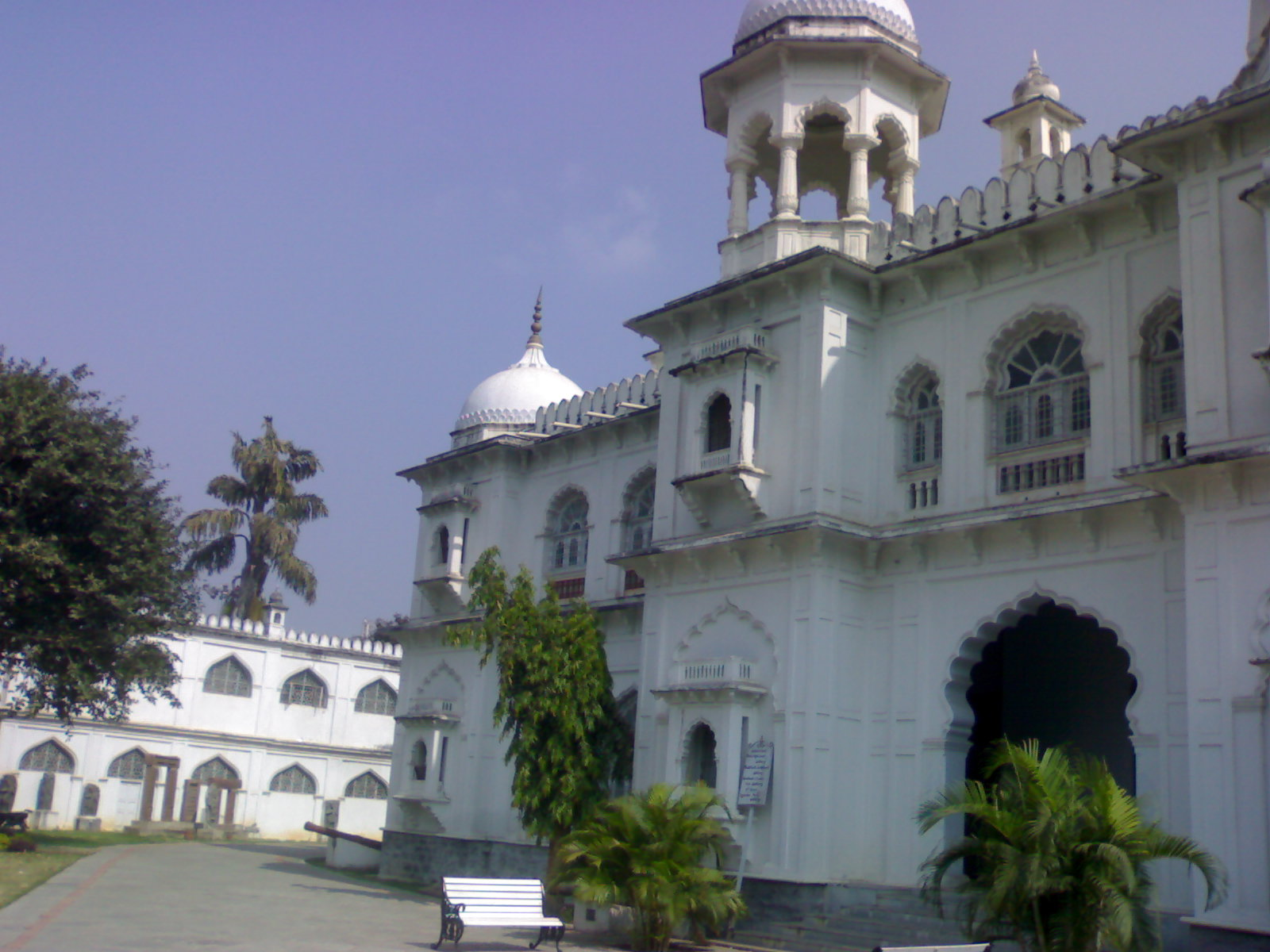
Telangana State Archaeology Museum, Hyderabad, established in 1930.

Name	City/Town	State/Territory	Year Established
Alampur Museum	Alampur	Telangana	
Birla Science Museum	Hyderabad	Telangana	
City Museum	Hyderabad	Telangana	
District Archaeological Museum, Nizamabad	Nizamabad		2001
Jagdish and Kamla Mittal Museum of Indian Art	Hyderabad	Telangana	1976
Nizam Museum	Hyderabad	Telangana	2000
Khazana Building Museum	Hyderabad	Telangana	
Salar Jung Museum	Hyderabad	Telangana	1951
Telangana State Archaeology Museum	Hyderabad	Telangana	1930
Warangal Museum	Warangal	Telangana	

=== Tripura ===
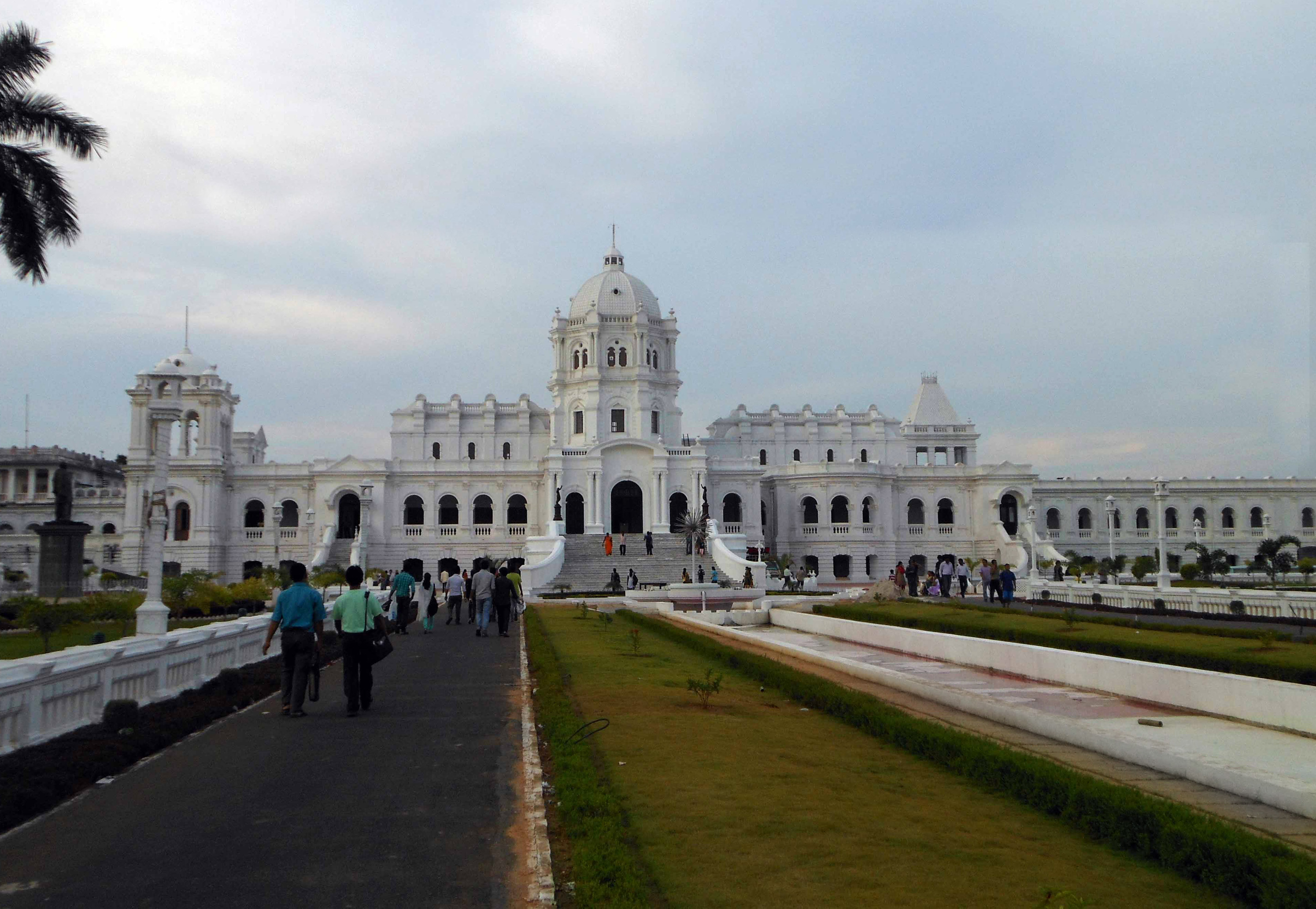
Tripura State Museum, established in 1970 in the Ujjayanta palace, is the largest museum in Northeast India.

Name	City/Town	State/Territory	Year Established
Tripura State Museum	Agartala	Tripura	1970

=== Uttar Pradesh ===
Name	City/Town	State/Territory	Year Established
State Museum, Lucknow	Lucknow	Uttar Pradesh	1863
Allahabad Museum	Allahabad	Uttar Pradesh	1931
Kanpur Sangrahalaya	Kanpur	Uttar Pradesh	1999
Government Museum, Mathura	Mathura	Uttar Pradesh	1874
Musa Dakri Museum	Aligarh		
Sarnath Museum	Sarnath	Uttar Pradesh	1910
Rashtriya Dalit Prerna Sthal and Green Garden	Noida	Uttar Pradesh	
Ibn Sina Academy of Medieval Medicine and Sciences	Aligarh	Uttar Pradesh	
Swaraj Bhavan (old Anand Bhavan)	Allahabad	Uttar Pradesh	

=== West Bengal ===
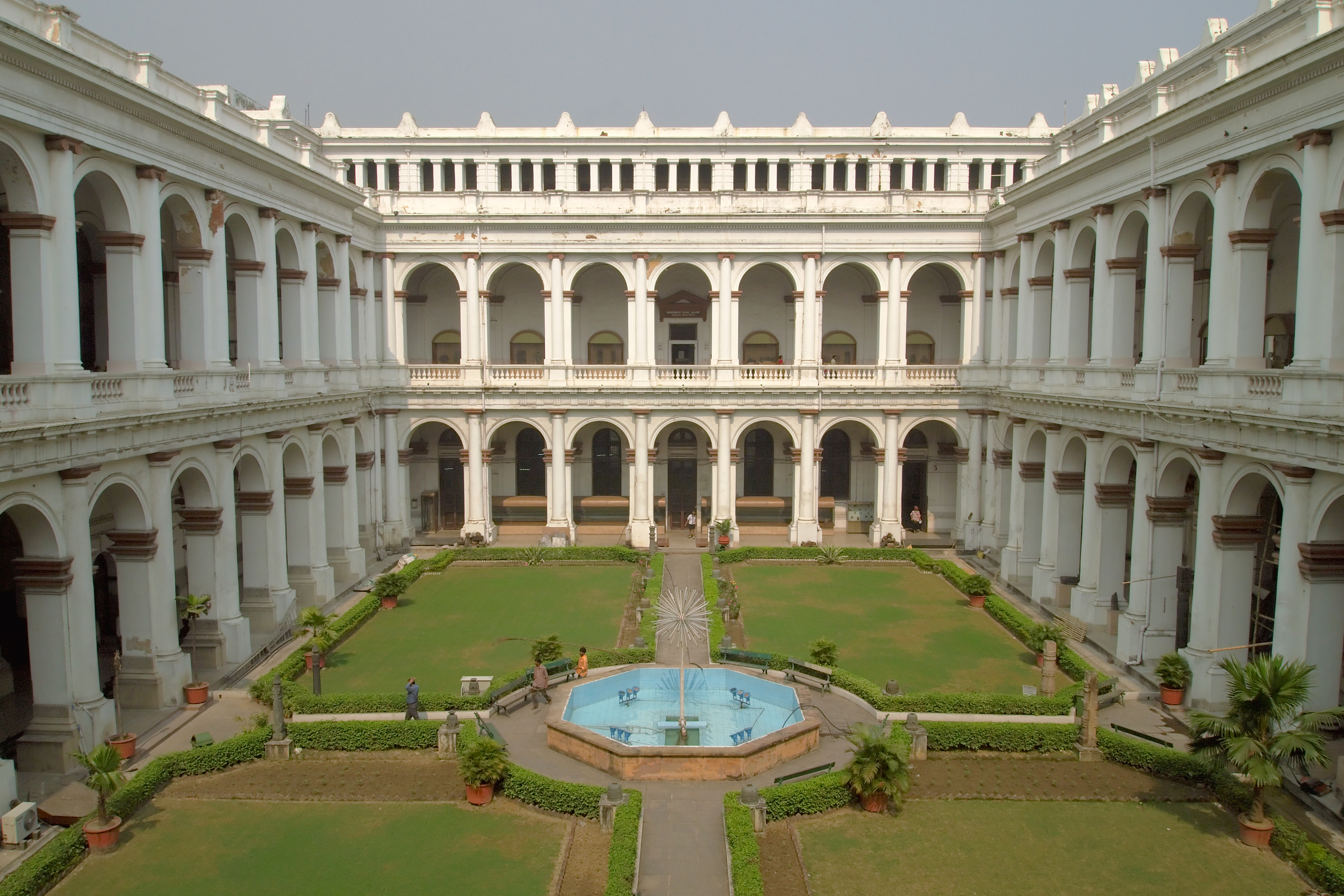
Indian Museum, Kolkata, established in 1814, is the oldest and the largest museum in Asia. It has a collection of 22,00,000 plus artifacts.

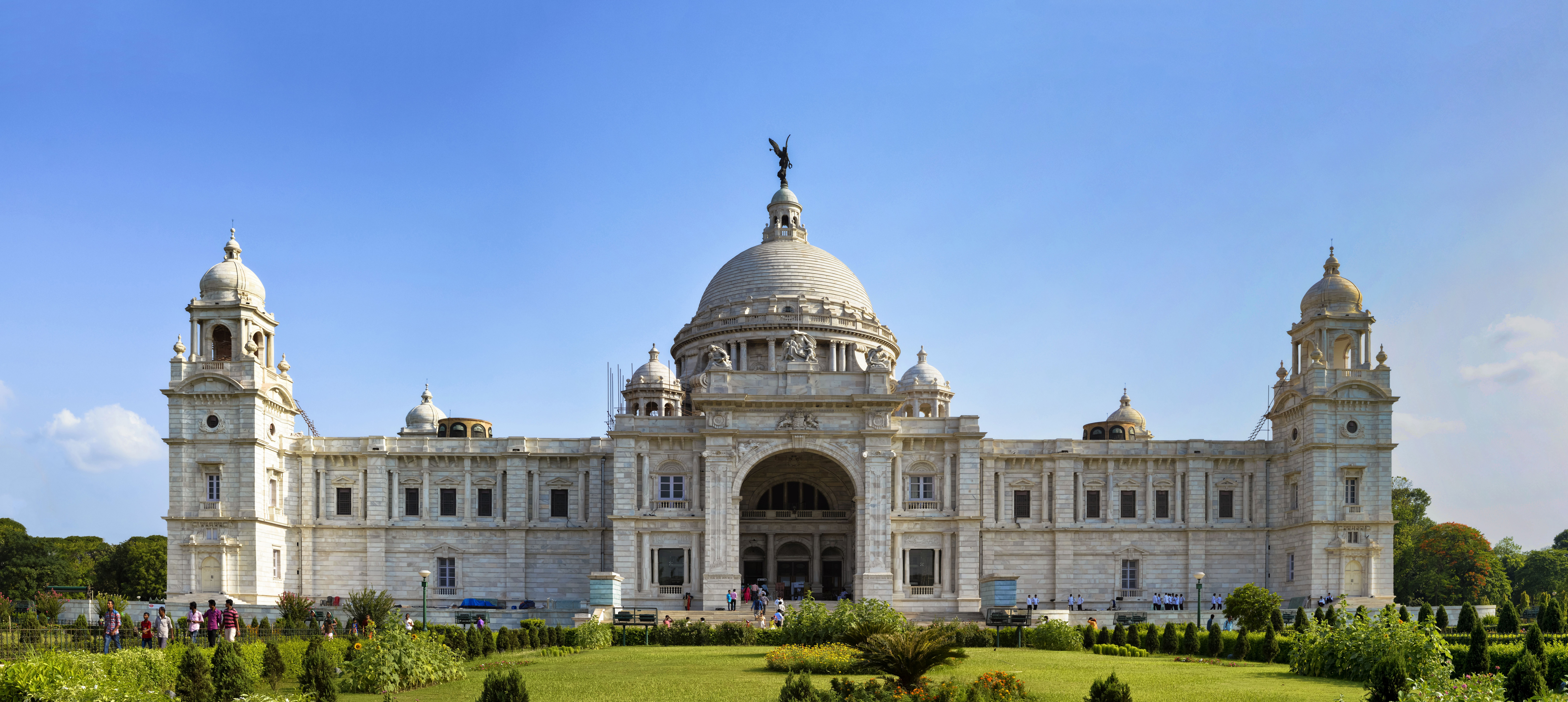
Victoria Memorial in Kolkata, established in 1921.

Name	City/Town	State/Territory	Year Established
Indian Museum	Kolkata	West Bengal	1814
Victoria Memorial	Kolkata	West Bengal	1921
Asutosh Museum of Indian Art	Kolkata	West Bengal	
State Archaeological Gallery	Kolkata	West Bengal	1962
Sabarna Sangrahashala	Kolkata	West Bengal	
Kolkata Museum of Modern Art	Kolkata	West Bengal	
Gurusaday Museum	Kolkata	West Bengal	1961
Marble Palace	Kolkata	West Bengal	
Metcalfe Hall	Kolkata	West Bengal	
Kolkata Town Hall	Kolkata	West Bengal	
Fort William	Kolkata	West Bengal	
Jorasanko Thakur Bari	Kolkata	West Bengal	
Academy of Fine Arts	Kolkata	West Bengal	
Kolkata Rail Museum	Kolkata	West Bengal	
Currency Building	Kolkata	West Bengal	
Mother's Wax Museum	Kolkata	West Bengal	
Asutosh Museum of Indian Art	Kolkata	West Bengal	
Fanattic Sports Museum	Kolkata	West Bengal	
Malda Museum	Malda	West Bengal	
Rabindra Museum	Mungpoo	West Bengal	
Hazarduari Palace Museum	Murshidabad	West Bengal	

== See also ==
- List of archives in India
- List of museums
- International Museum Day
- Tourism in India
- Culture of India

=== By State ===
- List of museums in Bihar
- List of museums in Karnataka
- List of museums in Kerala
- List of museums in Madhya Pradesh
- List of museums in Rajasthan
- List of museums in West Bengal

=== By subject ===
- List of aviation museums in India
- List of transport museums in India
- List of railway museums in India
- List of music museums in India
- List of science museums in India
