= List of museums in Kerala =

The list of museums in Kerala encompasses museums defined for this context as institutions (including nonprofit organizations, government entities, and private businesses) that collect and care for objects of cultural, artistic, scientific, or historical interest and make their collections or related exhibits available for public viewing. Also included are non-profit art galleries and exhibit spaces. Closed museums and museums that exist only in cyberspace (i.e., virtual museums) are not included.

Museum Name	Location	Type	Established	Jurisdiction	Collections/Attractions
Napier Museum	Thiruvananthapuram	Art and Natural history	1855	Department of Museums and Zoos, Government of Kerala	The museum houses a rare collection of archaeological and historic artefacts, bronze idols, ancient ornaments, a temple chariot and ivory carvings. It also contains the Sree Chitra Art Gallery, which contains works from Raja Ravi Varma and Nicholas Roerich, as well as examples of Mughal and Tanjore art. The Museum grounds also hold the Trivandrum Zoo, which is one of the oldest in India.
Indo-Portuguese Museum	Kochi		1910		
Keralam - Museum of History and Heritage	Thiruvananthapuram	Heritage center		Kerala Tourism, Kerala State Department of ArchaeologyGovernment of Kerala	The Keralam museum aims to document the continuous history and heritage of Kerala that spans over 3000 years as per available prehistorical and historical evidence. Exhibits include Iron Age artifacts, Roman Dinari, Sanskrit/Malayalam Granthas written on palm leaves, 17th Century murals, 14th Century Brahma Sculpture and Yoga Narasimha Murthy, 16th Century Nataraja Sculpture and more. This museum uses modern interactive technologies such as touch-screen counters and multimedia systems for explanation and displaying narrative documentaries.
Beecraft Honey Museum, or "Honey Museum Wayanad"	Old Vythiri, Vythiri, Wayanad	Natural history			
Kerala State Museum and Zoo Thrissur	Chembukkavu, Thrissur	Art, Natural history, and zoo	1885	Department of Culture, Government of Kerala	
Archaeological Museum Thrissur	Chembukkavu, Thrissur	Historical site, Art and Archaeology	Built 1938 Converted 1975	Department of Archaeology, Government of Kerala	
Shakthan Thampuran Palace	Chembukkavu, Thrissur	Historical site, Archaeology	Built 1795 Converted 2005	Department of Archaeology, Government of Kerala	
Vallathol Museum	Cheruthuruthi, Thrissur	Historic house museum	Unknown		
Kerala Folklore Museum	Kochi	Architecture, ethnography and anthropology of Kerala	Built 2009	Private. Founded by George Thaliath	
Teak Museum	Malappuram	Teak planatation and museum of teak wood	Built 1995	Kerala Forest Research Institute	
Kerala Museum	Kochi	Contains galleries of dolls, modern art, and the history of Kerala.	Built 1984	Founded by Madhavan Nayar Foundation	
District Heritage Museum	Palakkad	District museum featuring five galleries containing musical instruments, fashion, and history.	Built 2021	Indian National Trust for Art and Cultural Heritage (INTACH)	
PhotoMuse Museum of Photography	Thrissur	Public museum dedicated to the art, history and science of Photography.	Built 2014	Public charitable trust Better Art Foundation, founded by Dr. Unni Krishnan Pulikkal S.	PhotoMuse is India's first public museum dedicated to the art, history and science of Photography. Through the pursuit of photography and photographic history, PHOTOMUSE documents, interprets and promotes the natural and cultural inheritance of humanity. With photography-based outreach and educational programs, the museum emphasizes education, conservancy and India’s photographic legacy.
Art Museum of Love	Thrissur	A private museum featuring paintings, photographs, sculptures, textiles, books, and other collectibles centered around the theme of love.	Built 2024	Founded by Dr. Unni Krishnan Pulikkal S.	The museum holds a broad collection of art and literary works that express the emotion of love in its various forms - in Indian traditional art, contemporary art, textiles and popular motifs, with a dedicated gallery of the history of erotic art.

== See also ==
- List of museums in India
- International Museum Day
