= List of museums in Jharkhand =

This is a list of museums in Jharkhand state in eastern India.

Name	City/Town	Theme	Year Established
Ranchi Science Centre	Ranchi	Science	2010
State Museum Hotwar	Ranchi	Culture	2009
Tribal Research Institute and Museum	Ranchi	Research	
Sanskriti Museum & Art Gallery	Hazaribagh	Art Gallery	1991

== See also ==
- List of museums in India
