= Indian Business Museum =

- Established: 2013
- Location: Kozhikode, Kerala
- Type: Specialized museum
- Curator: M.G. Sreekumar (convenor)
- Owner: Indian Institute of Management Kozhikode
- Website: www.iimk.ac.in

The Indian Business Museum is located in IIM Kozhikode, in the city of Kozhikode, in the state of Kerala, India. It was opened in 2013. The museum intends to collect, consolidate, and conserve the business history of India.

== Background ==
The museum was inaugurated in 2013 by then HRD Minister Palam Raju. Many business houses, including Tata, Godrej, Reliance, Reserve Bank of India and Infosys, have set up their pavilions inside the museum. The museum, spanning over 23,000 square feet (2,100 m^{2}), also has a Malabar Pavilion sponsored by the Malabar Chamber of Commerce.

== See also ==
- List of museums in India
