= Kerala Soil Museum =

Soil museum in Kerala, India

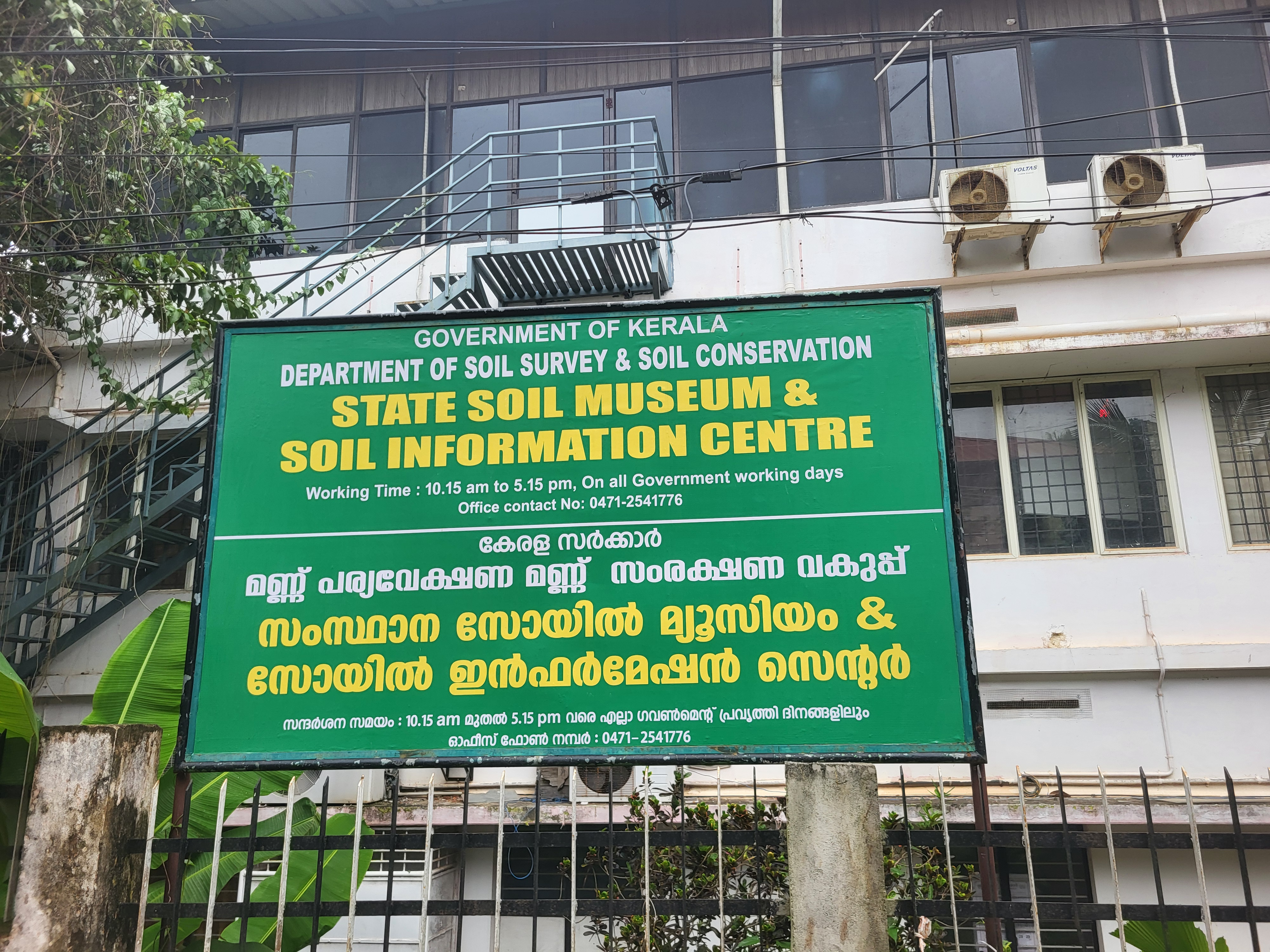

- Location within Thiruvananthapuram
- Established: January 2014
- Location: Parottukonam, Thiruvananthapuram
- Coordinates: 8.537575°N 76.937555°E
- Website: State Soil Museum

Map of the soils of Kerala

Kerala Soil Museum is a museum on the premises of Central Soil Analytical Laboratory at Parottukonam, Thiruvananthapuram District, in the Indian state of Kerala. The museum displays the diverse types of soil in the state. It was set up by the Department of Soil Survey and Conservation of Government of Kerala and inaugurated on 1 January 2014. It has been described as the world's largest soil museum and the first soil museum in India established to international standards.

== History ==
The state government established the soil museum to provide an exhibition of the richness of Kerala's soils and mineral resources, as well as to foster public awareness about conservation and ecological protection. The museum's staff were trained by personnel from the World Soil Museum at Wageningen University in the Netherlands.

== Exhibits ==
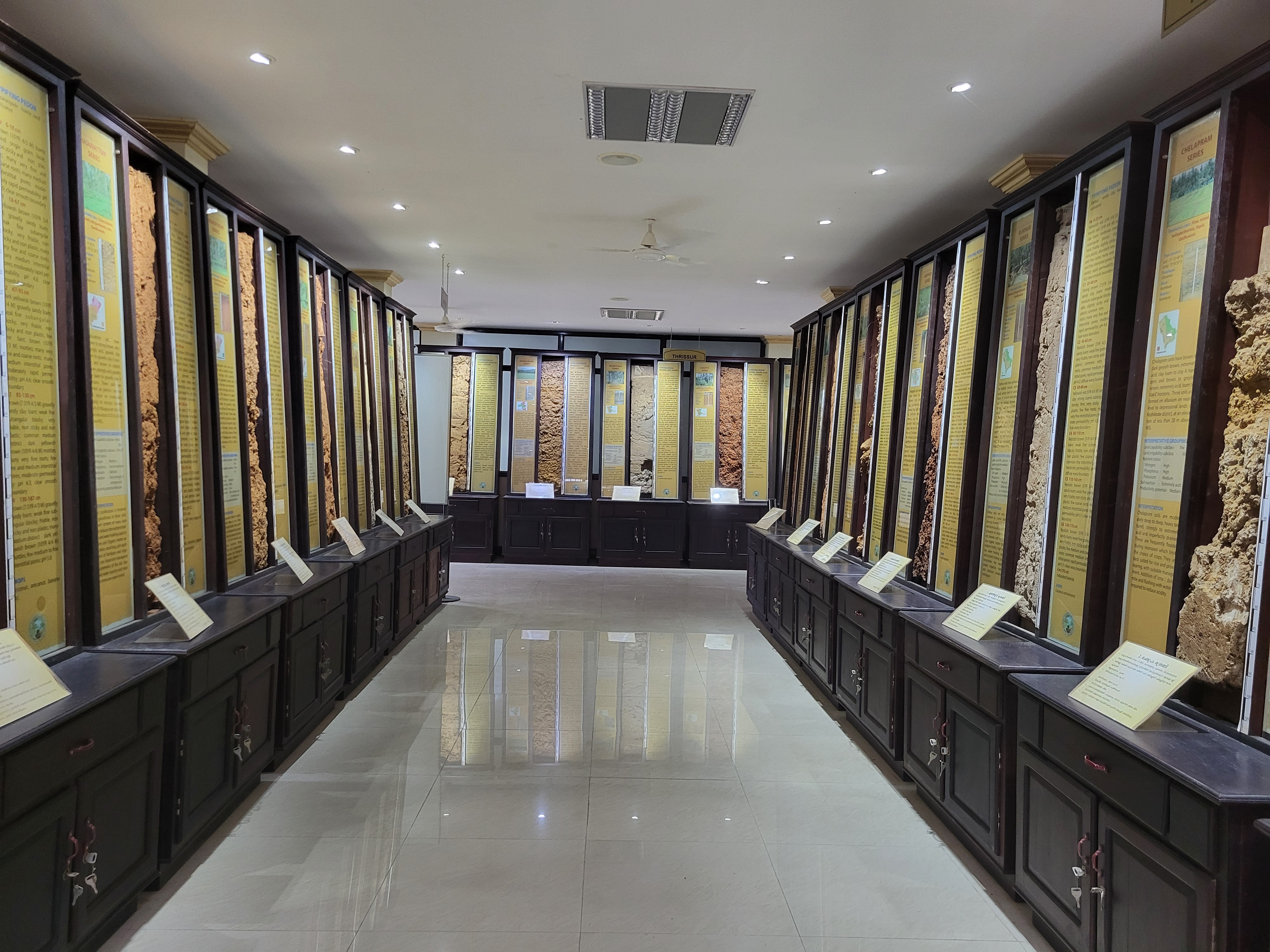
Soils collected from different regions of Kerala

The most important exhibits in the museum are a set of 82 display containers 1.5 metres tall which preserve and display the intact soil profiles of all of the 82 soil series recognised in the state of Kerala. Each monolith was dug from the ground without disturbing its elements and was processed for one month or longer before being mounted for museum display. Alongside each monolith is information about the soil, including the physical characteristics of the soil series, where it is found, its nutrient status, the crops it is best suited for, and recommendations for use and management of land where the soil is present. The soil classifications displayed in the museum are based on the US Department of Agriculture soil taxonomy.

Other exhibits include a geological map of Kerala; a map of Kerala showing the distribution of the eight soil orders represented in the state; collections of rocks and minerals and the physical constituents of soil, such as clay, silt, sand, stone, and gravel; displays explaining how soils are formed; and displays about the relationship of soil to the issues of food security and climate change.

Attached to the museum is a Soil Information Centre that exhibits a model of a watershed, illustrating both the elements of a watershed and a variety of conservation measures.

== See also ==
- List of science centers#Asia
