= 8 Point Art Cafe =

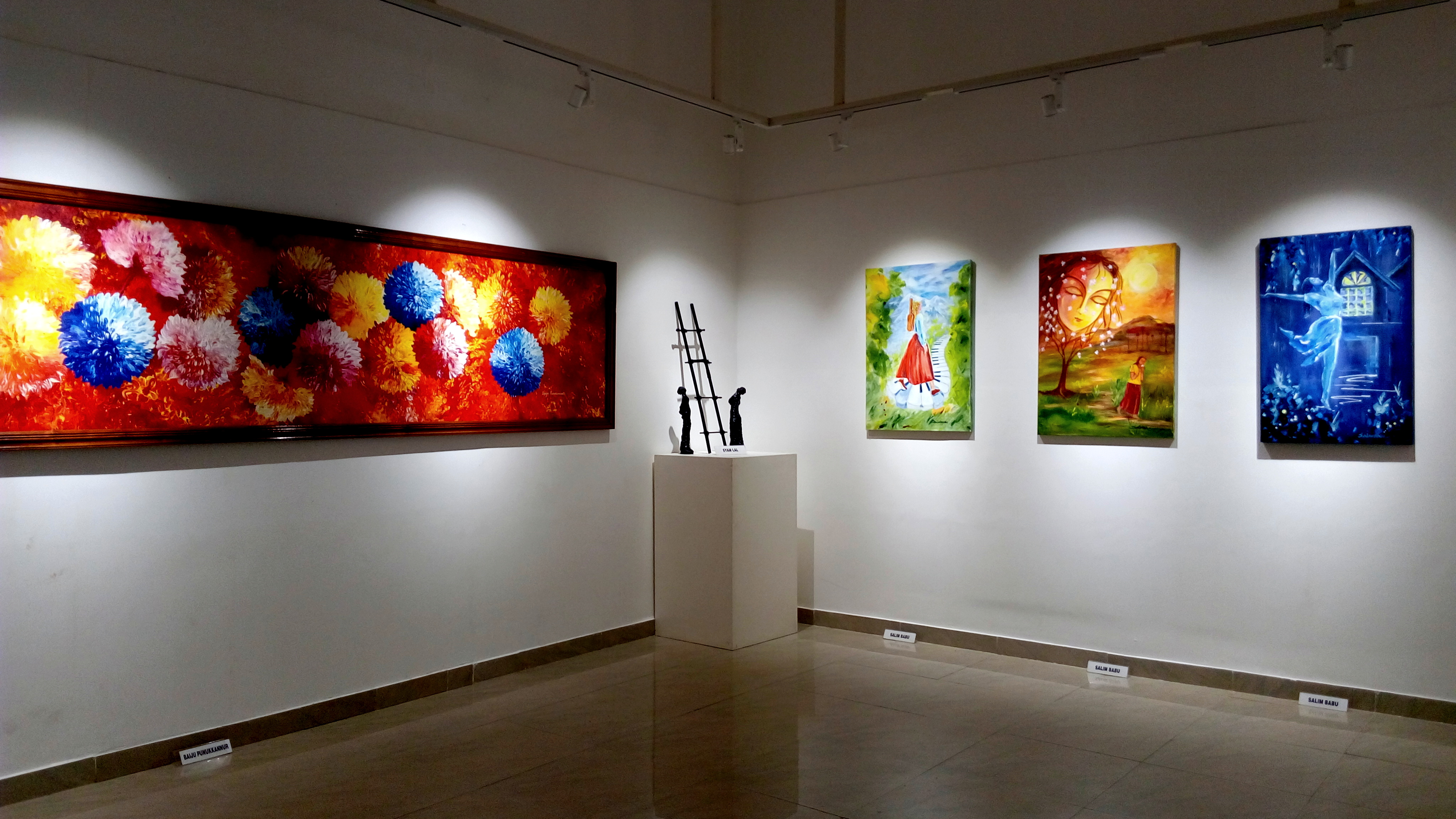
- Inside view of Eight-point Gallery Cafe
- Established: 2 October 2015
- Location: Asramam, Kollam
- Coordinates: 8.896463°N 76.586157°E
- Type: Art museum
- Collections: Paintings and sculpture
- Founders: Shenley Renjan (Art Director)
- Public transit access: Kollam KSRTC - 1.3 km Kollam Junction - 2.1 km Kollam KSWTD - 1.3 km
- Website: http://www.dtpckollam.com/

The Eight-point Gallery Cafe or 8 Point Art Cafe is an art gallery and cafe situated in Kollam (Quilon) city of Kerala, India. This is the first international standard art cafe in the city of Kollam. Eight-Point is established in a renovated heritage building, 'Parambarya,' inside the Asramam Picnic Village campus. Famous muralist and art director Mr. Shenley had taken the Parambarya building from Kollam District Tourism Promotion Councils (DTPC) for five years to set-up this art cafe. The Kollam DTPC has spent nearly 2 million Indian Rupee for the renovation and setting up of properties in the museum/Paramparya building.

Now the art cafe is home for various exhibitions, performing arts and other events.

The gallery has held an exhibition on paintings by Arjun Maroli that depicts Kollam district on canvas 'KL02'. The exhibition was inaugurated by artist Anavadya.

== Toponymy ==
The name 'eight-point' represents the eight creeks of Ashtamudi Lake and the eight art forms incorporated in the gallery.

== Facilities ==
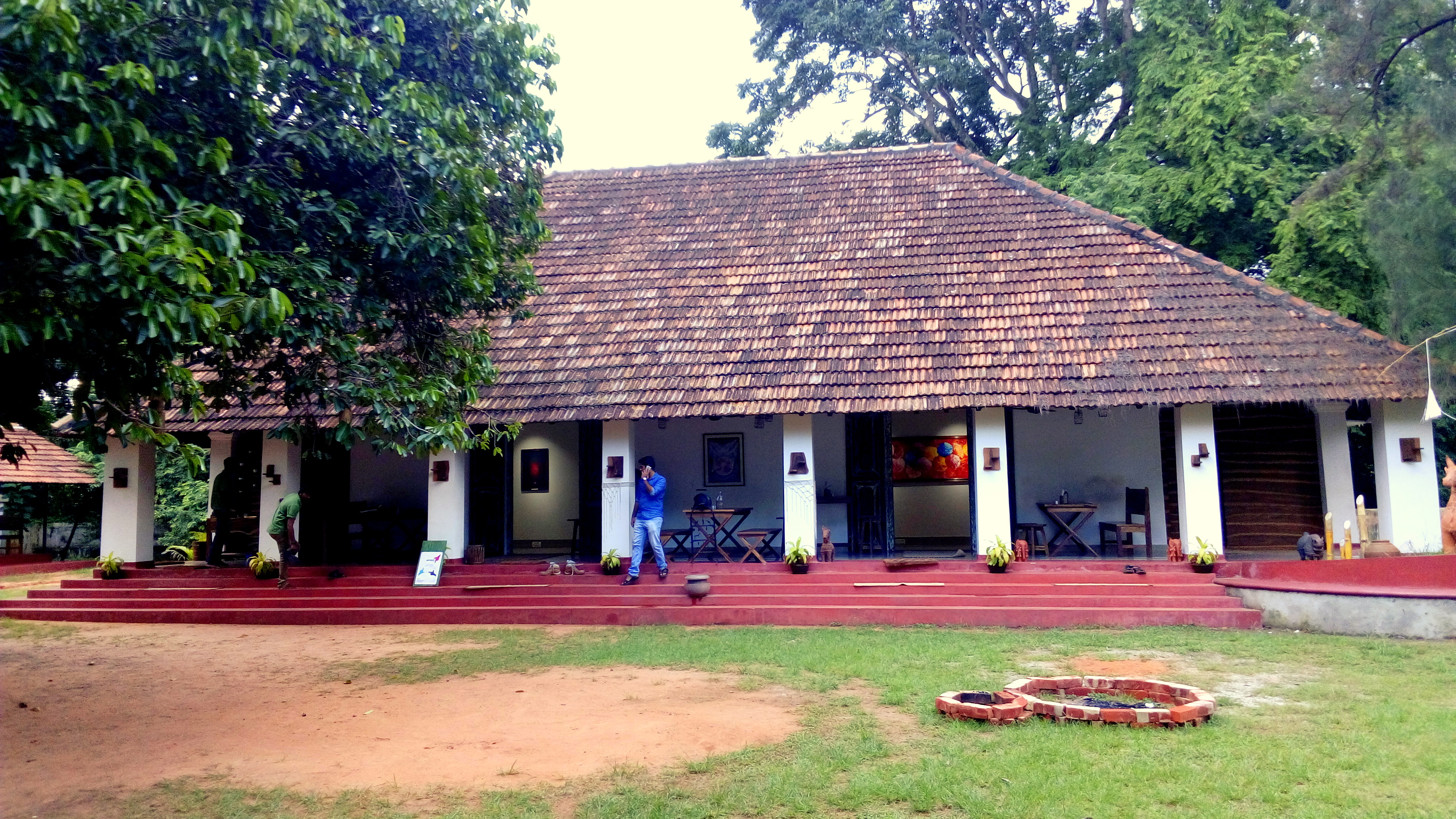
"Parambarya building" in Asramam Picnic Village were Eight-Point Gallery Cafe is situated

- Gallery
- Cafe
- Theatre
- Library
- Venue for Music

== Little Free Library ==
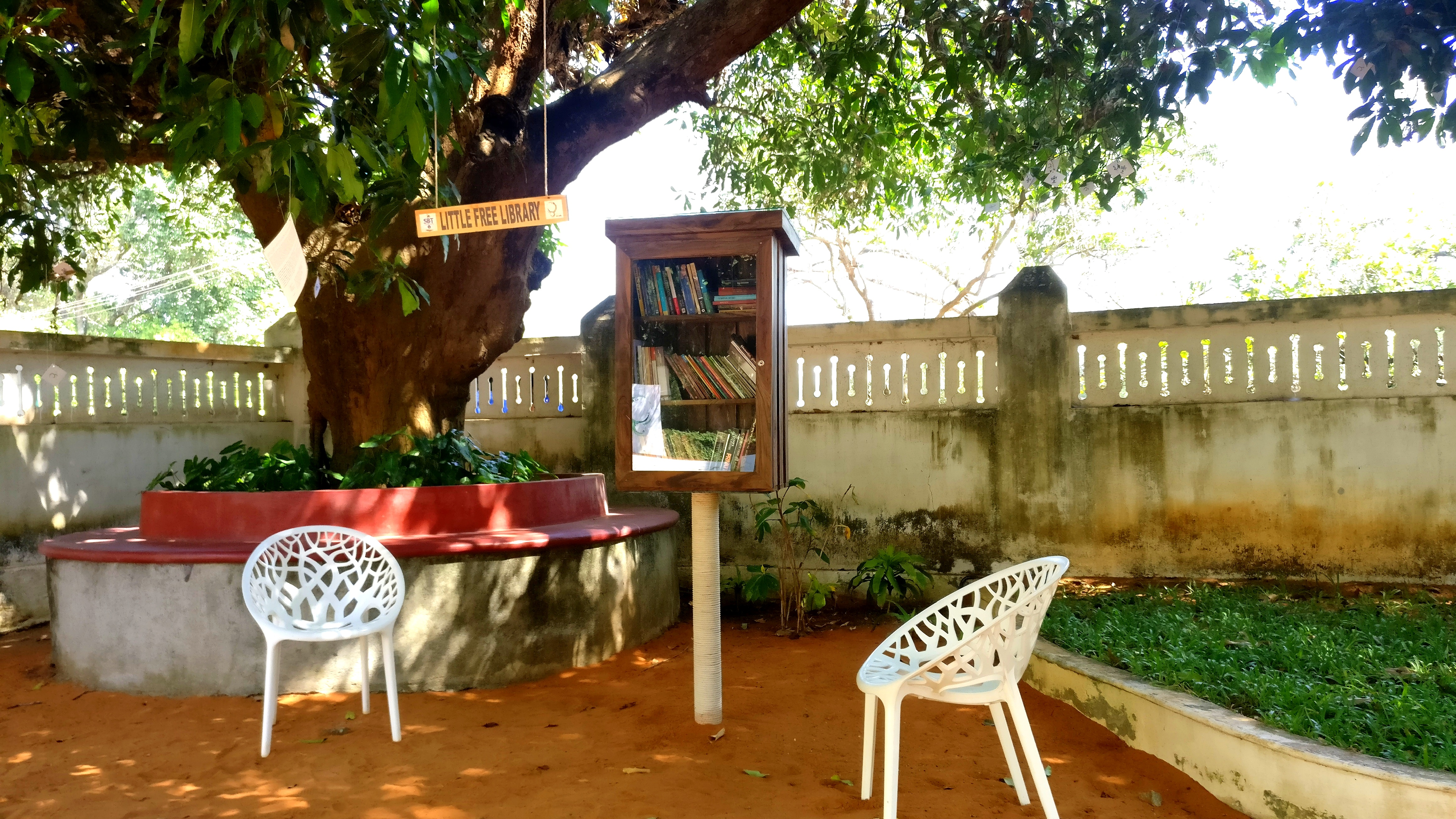
Kerala's first Little Free Library at 8 Point Art cafe

The first Little Free Library in Kerala is set up at 8 Point Art Cafe. The library is having 50 books in the small shelf situated at the courtyard and readers can take any book without fee by keeping another book.

== See also ==
- Kollam
- British Residency
- Adventure Park, Kollam
- Cheena Kottaram
