= District Archaeological Museum, Nizamabad =

- Established: October 24, 2001
- Coordinates: 18.6756049°N 78.1029443°E

District Archaeological Museum, Nizamabad is a museum in Nizamabad, in the Indian state of Telangana.

== History ==
It was established on 24 October, 2001.

== Collections ==
The collection includes artefacts from the Chalukya, Rashtrakuta, and Kakatiya periods.

== Building ==
The museum is housed in a building in the middle of the Tilak Gardens. It was constructed as the Town Hall in 1936.
