= Antarang Museum =

Sexuality museum in India

Coordinates: 18.9674278°N 72.8243587°E

The Antarang – Sex Health Information Art Gallery, also known as the Antarang Museum, was dedicated to educating the young and old about the human body, sexuality and AIDS. It was the only museum of its kind in South Asia. The museum was founded in Mumbai in 2002 as a result of the joint efforts of the Municipal Corporation of Greater Mumbai (MCGM) and the Mumbai District Aids Control Society (MDACS) & Dr Prakash Sarang following an increase in AIDS cases. In 2008, the museum made plans to relocate to Goa. However, the museum shut down and did not reopen.

The museum's collection included wooden and plastic models of human anatomy as well as a presentation about pregnancy and reproduction. The free museum taught local groups about sex education, and its regular client base grew to include prostitutes and their clients.
