= Asutosh Museum of Indian Art =

Museum in Kolkata, India

Coordinates: 22.5698°N 88.3608°E

Asutosh Museum of Indian Art is an art museum located in the main campus of University of Calcutta on College Street, Kolkata (previously Calcutta), India, on the first and second floors of the Centenary Building. Established in 1937, it is the first public museum in any University in India. The university museum is named after Sir Ashutosh Mukherjee who was the Vice-Chancellor of the university for four consecutive two-year terms (1906–1914) and a fifth two-year term (1921–23). The objective of the museum was to collect and preserve specimens of various phases of Indian art with special emphasis on the art of Bengal.
