= Mizoram State Museum =

Ethnographic museum in Mizoram, India

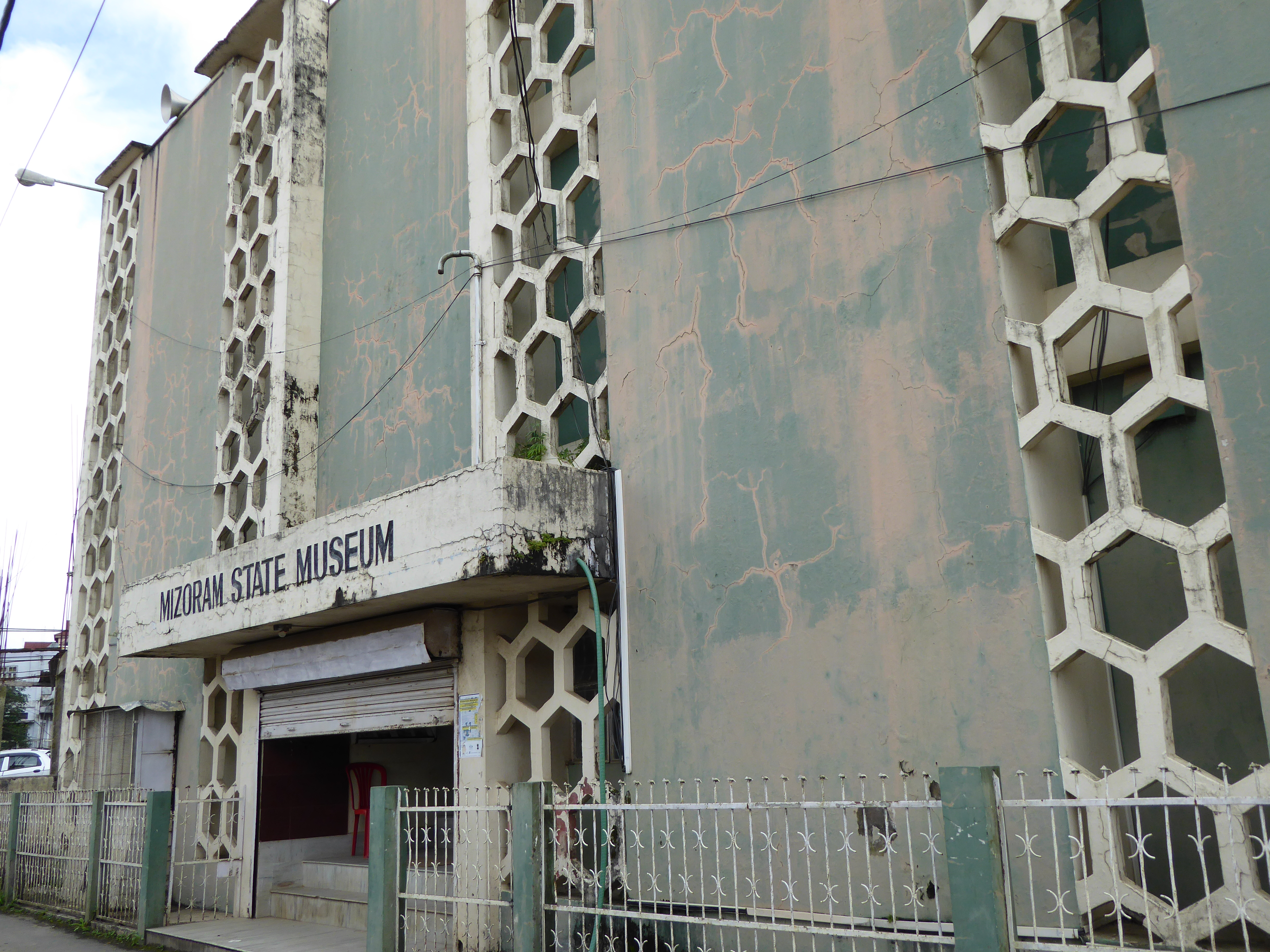
- Mizoram State Museum
- Established: April 1977
- Location: Aizawl, Mizoram, India
- Coordinates: 23.7381°N 92.7156°E

The Mizoram State Museum is in Aizawl, Mizoram, India. It is an ethnographic museum with multipurpose collections on display. There are five galleries: Textile Gallery, Ethnology, History, Anthropology, Natural History, and an Archaeology Terrace. The collection occupies four floors.

== History ==
The museum was established in April 1977 by the Tribal Research Institute under Education Department. From 1989, it came under Art and Culture department. The museum was earlier housed in a rented building but on 14 July 1990 it was moved to a new building, at Mc Donald Hill. The museum galleries have undergone a lot of renovation under the care of Indian Museum, Kolkata. Financial assistance was also received from Victoria Memorial, Kolkata.

== Gallery ==
Some artifacts from the museum
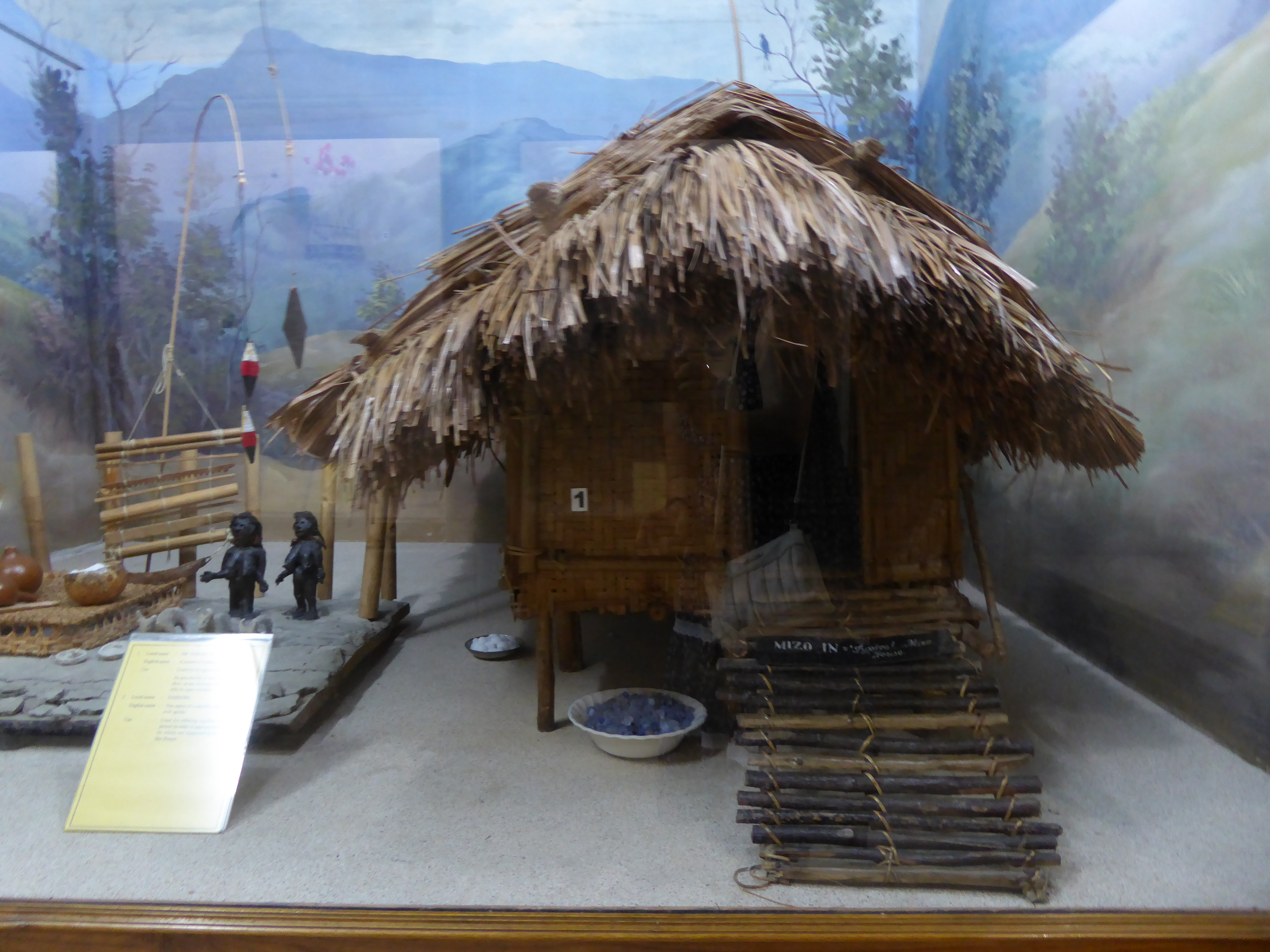
Model of Mizo house

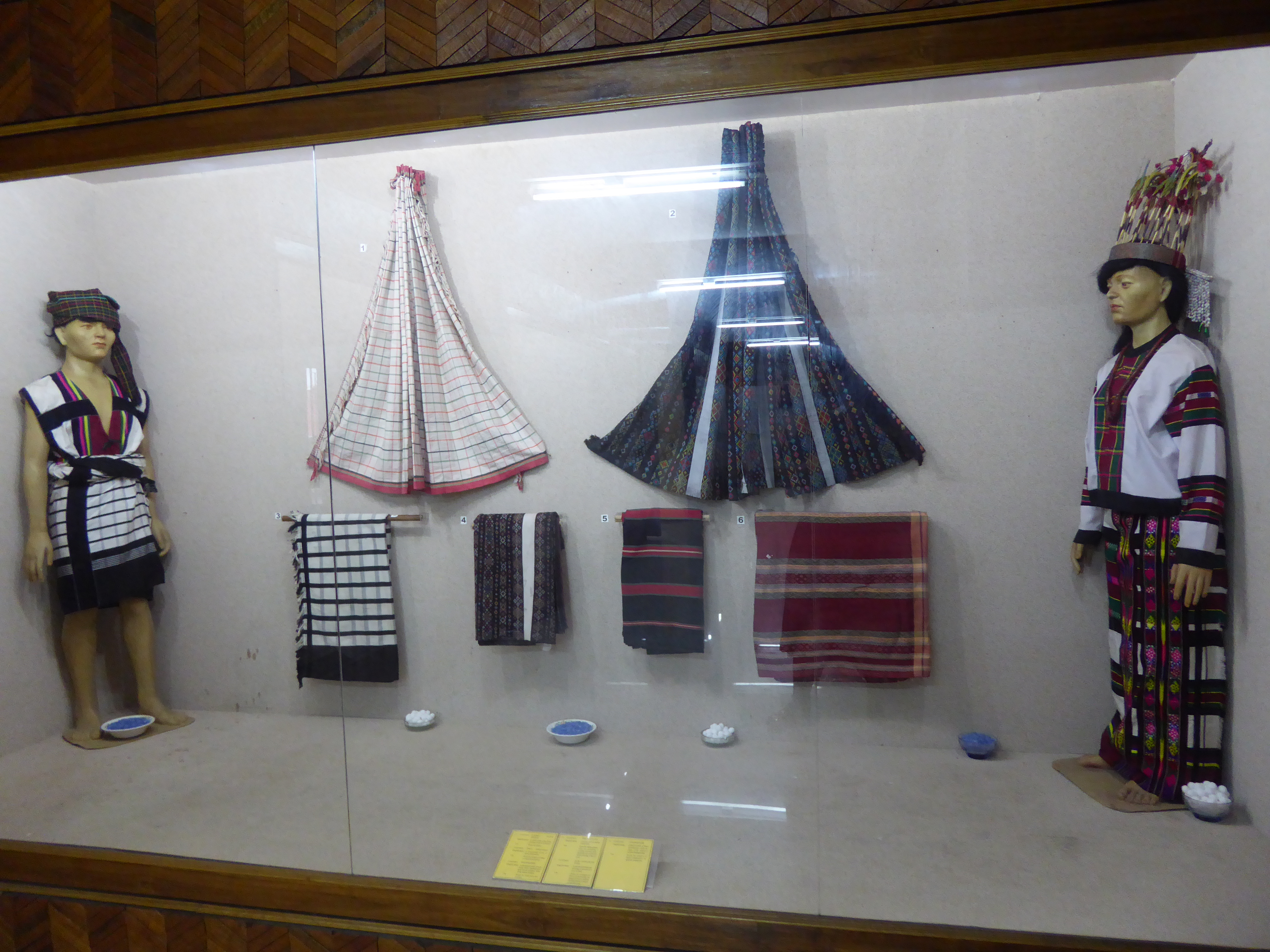
Mizo traditional costumes (left: male; right: female)

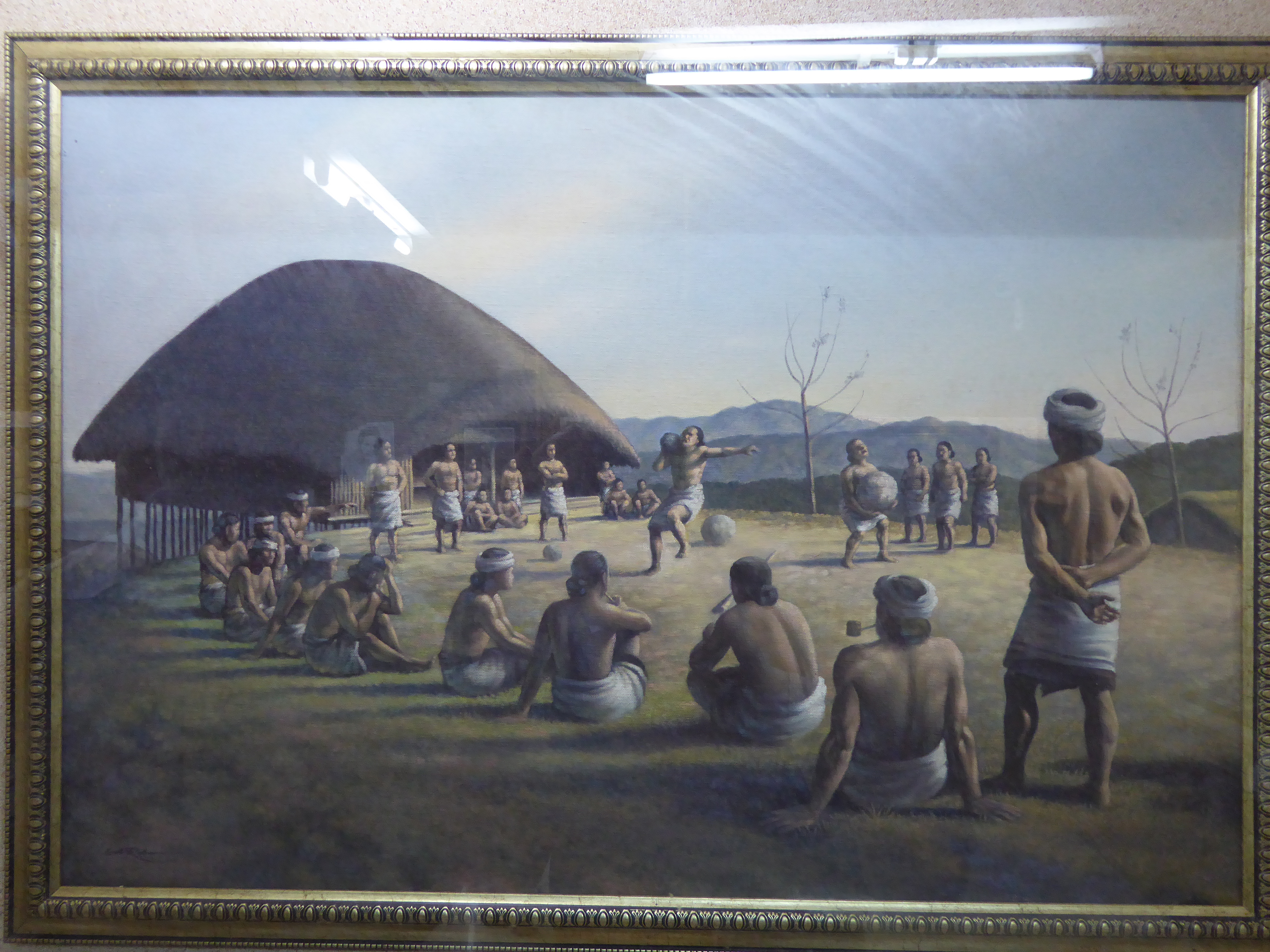
Young men studying near their bachelor dormitory

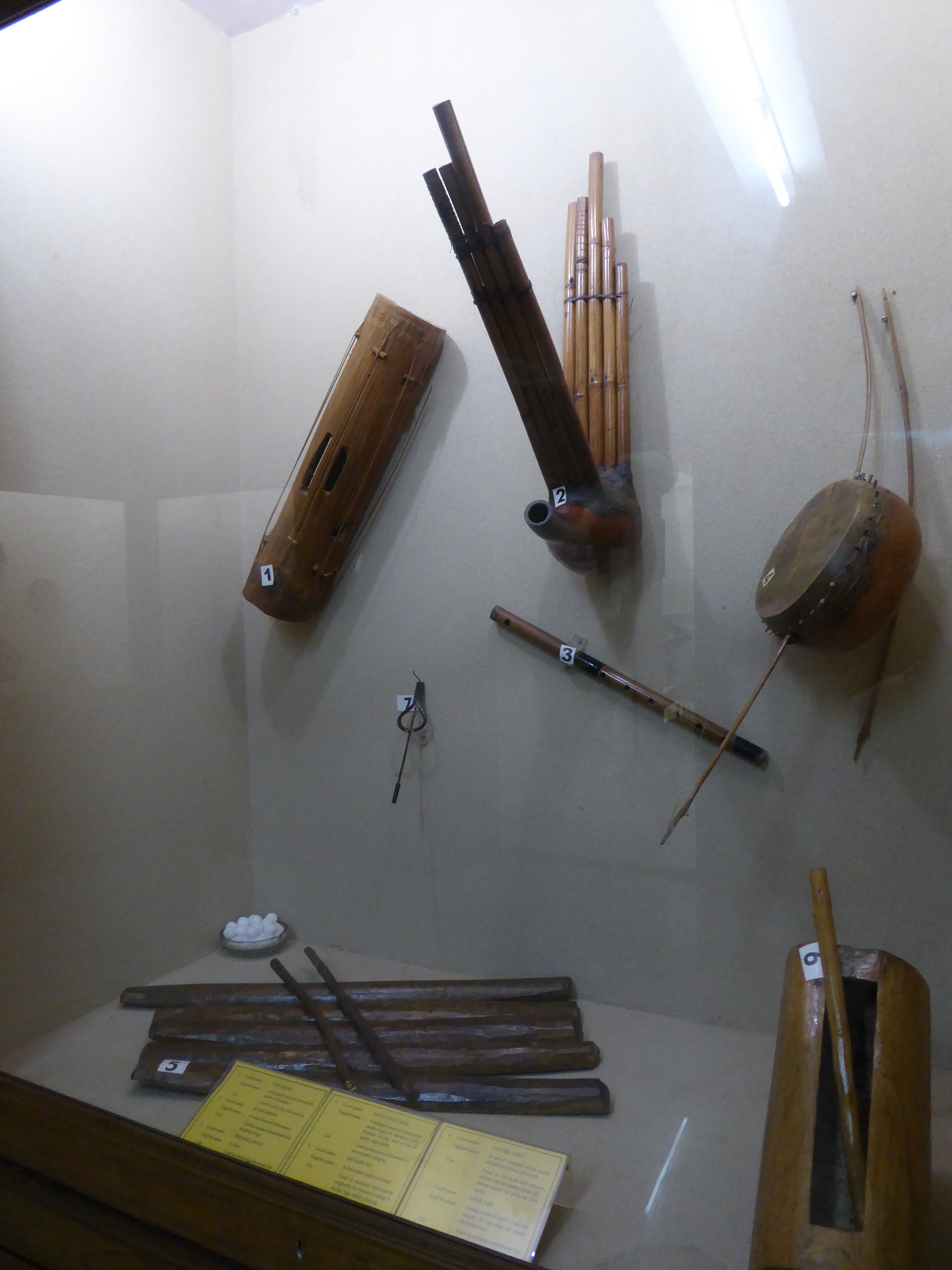
Mizo folk musical instruments

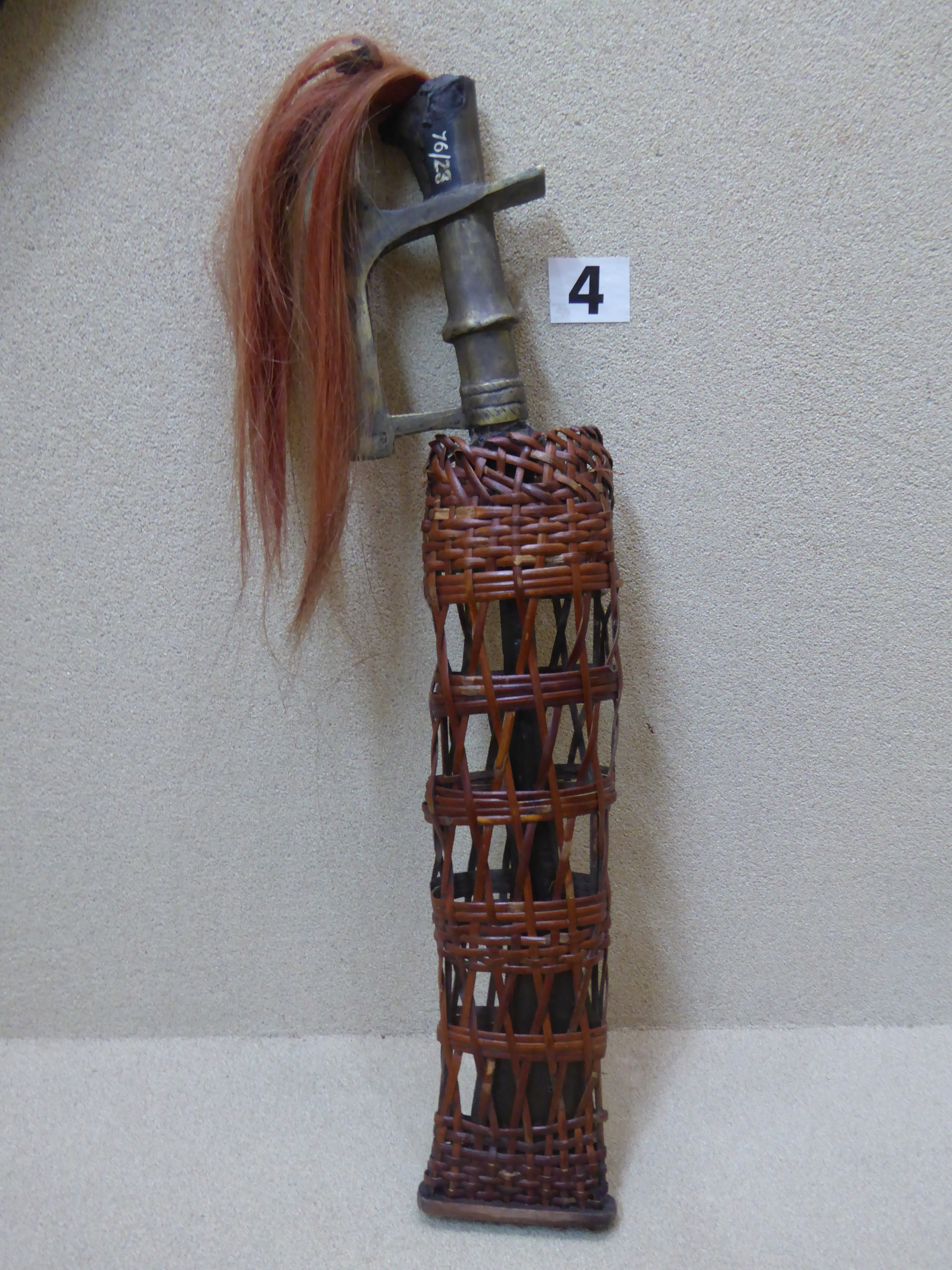
A knife (called dao) specially made for chopping off heads of killed enemies
