= State Museum, Ranchi =

Indian cultural museum in Jharkhand

State Museum Hotwar
- Location within Jharkhand
- Established: 2009
- Location: Khelgaon Mega Sports Complex, Hotwar, Ranchi, Jharkhand, India
- Coordinates: 23°23′0.73″N 85°23′7.64″E
- Type: Cultural
- Directors: Vandana Dadel, Secretary
- Website: www.statemuseumranchi.in

State Museum Hotwar is an Indian cultural museum located in Ranchi, in the Indian state of Jharkhand. The current secretary of the museum is Vandana Dandel.

== History ==
The museum's original name was Ranchi Museum. It was established on the premises of the Tribal Research Institute in 1974. Confined by the boundaries of the building, it moved to a new site in Hotwar, Ranchi. On 10 September 2009, the museum was inaugurated by Vice President Mohammad Hamid Ansari of India.

The museum was built to express the cultural heritage of Jharkhand. It has ten galleries, and contains paintings by artists from many states such as Bengal, Orissa, and Bihar. The museum has a library that is well-equipped and can house up to 300 people.
