= Archaeological Museum, Thrissur =

Coordinates: 10.5303°N 76.2228°E

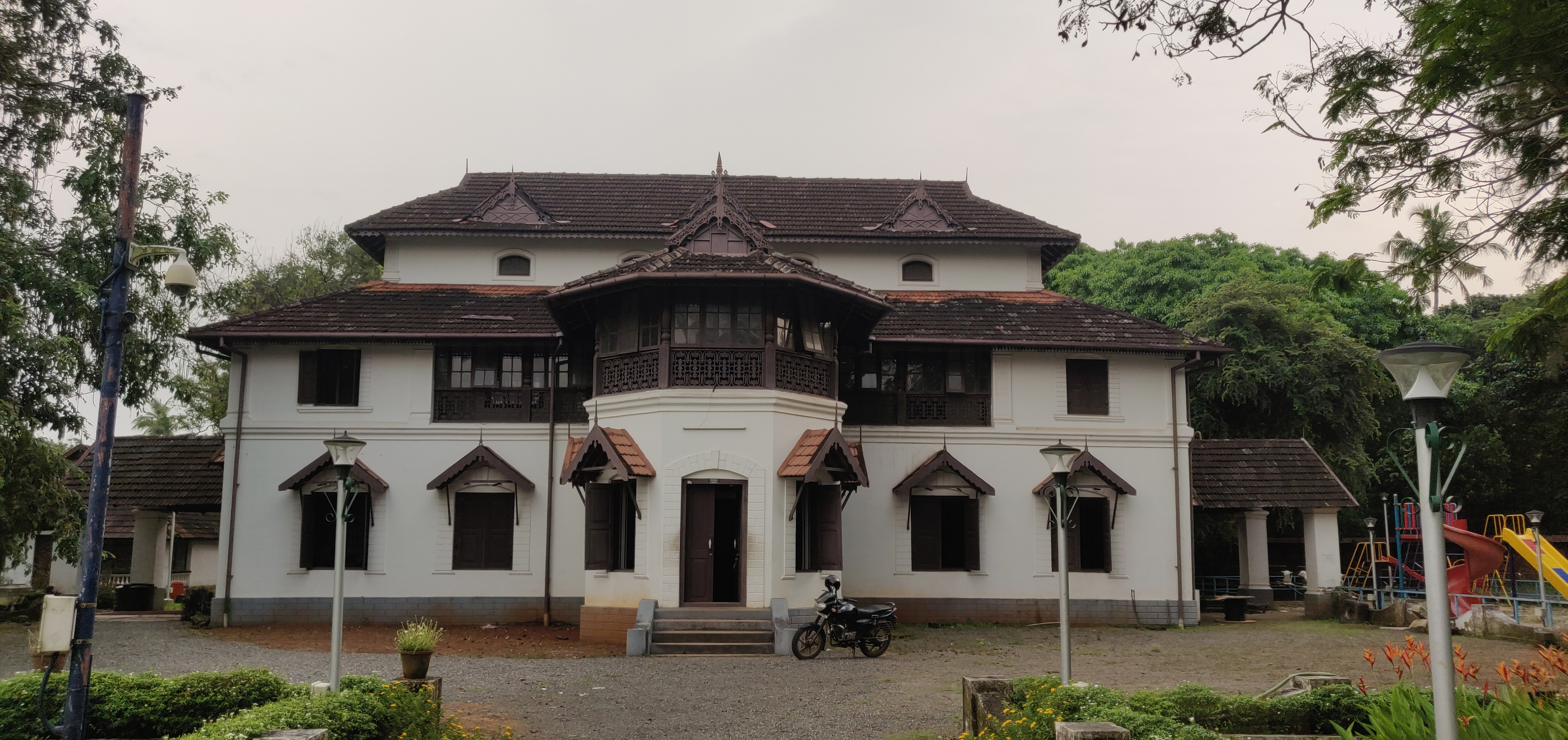
- Established: 1938
- Location: Kollengode Palace, Chembukavu, Thrissur, Kerala, India
- Type: Museum
- Curator: Bala Mohan
- Website: http://archaeology.kerala.gov.in/monuments/archaeological-museum/11

Archaeological Museum, Thrissur is an art and archaeological museum located in Thrissur City, Kerala state, India. The museum is situated within the Thrissur Zoo compound.

== History ==
The archaeological museum was established as Sree Mulam Chithrasala (Picture Gallery) in 1938 under the auspices of the Government of Cochin. The gallery was initially located in the balcony of Thrissur Town Hall. An archaeological gallery was added to the Picture Gallery in 1948. In 1975, the Department of Archaeology acquired a building at Chembukavu in Thrissur City. The archaeological and Picture Gallery collections were then shifted to the new building and the institution was renamed the Archaeological Museum, Thrissur.

== Collections ==
The museum houses life-size statues of prominent personalities, models of ancient temples and monuments, and manuscripts written on dry palm leaves. The megalith collection includes earthen pots, urn burials (Nannangadi), black and red wares, black wares, and russet-coated wares. Other exhibits include stone age tools, excavated materials from Indus Valley civilization sites and Cheraman Parambu (Kodungallur), and excavated materials from megalithic sites, such as beads and iron implements. The collection features stone sculptures dating from the 7th to 10th centuries and bronze sculptures dating from the 12th to 18th centuries. It also has artifacts from Thrissur district, Wayanad district and Palakkad district.

- Open 10:00–17:00 daily except Mondays and national holidays.
