= Vallathol Museum =

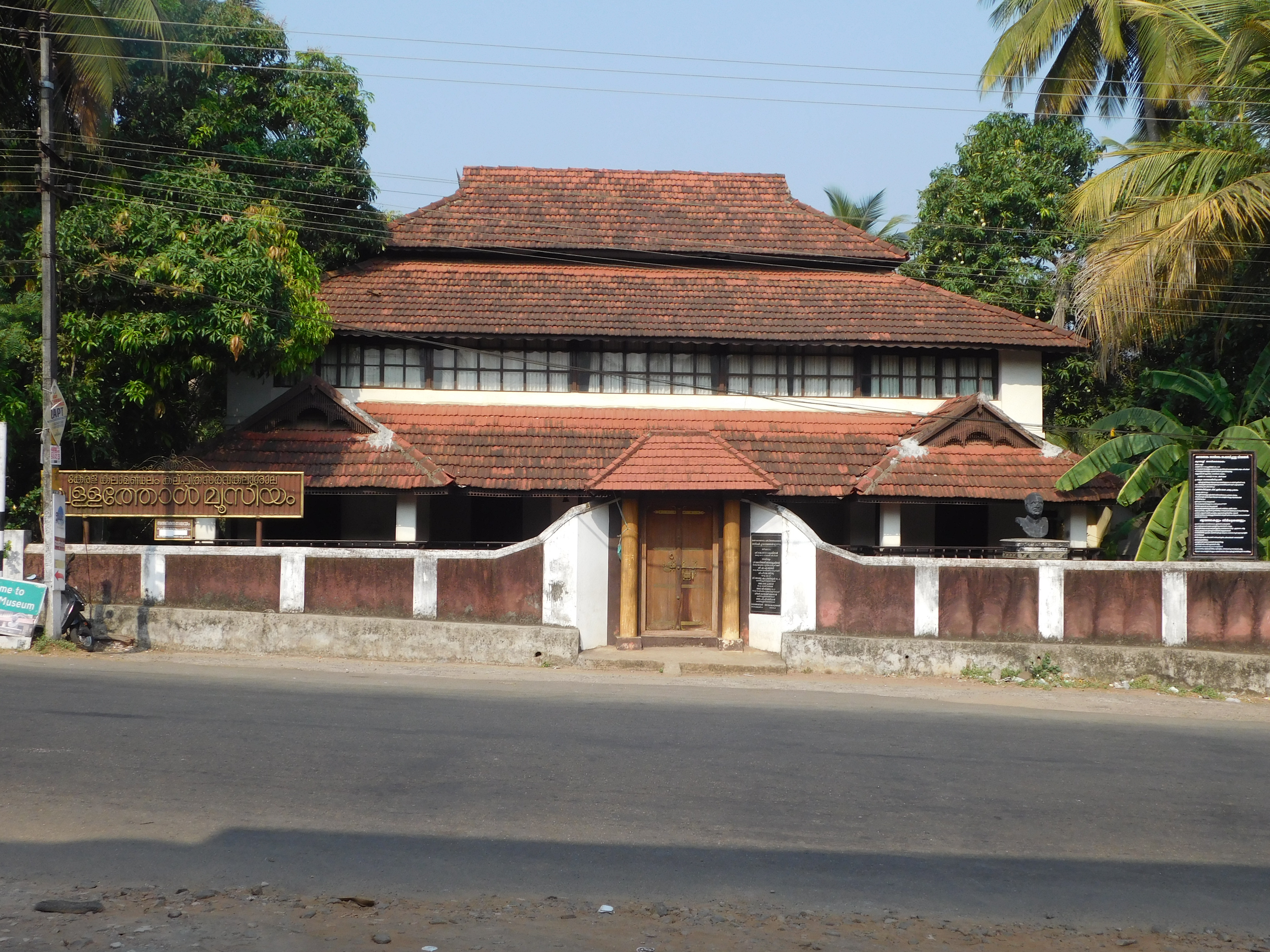
- Entrance to the museum
- Location: Vallathol Nagar, Cheruthuruthi, Thrissur District, Kerala, India
- Coordinates: 10.749453°N 76.274580°E
- Type: Biographical museum Historic house museum

Vallathol Museum is a museum dedicated to Vallathol Narayana Menon, a poet in the Malayalam language and the founder of Kerala Kalamandalam. It is built on the banks of river Bharathapuzha at Vallathol Nagar in Cheruthuruthi, Thrissur District. The museum exhibits works, cultural contributions, achievements, writings and images of Vallathol Narayana Menon in his lifetime. The museum was the earlier residence of Vallathol Narayana Menon.
