= Indo-Portuguese Museum =

Museum in Fort Kochi, Kerala, India

- Established: 2000
- Location: Bishop's House in Fort Kochi, Ernakulam, Kerala, India
- Coordinates: 9.9658°N 76.2421°E
- Type: Christian art
- Director: Bishop Of Cochin
- Curator: Rev Fr Raphy Pariyathysherry
- Public transit access: Fort Kochi Water Metro - Kochi Metro - Ernakulam South Railway Station - Cochin Port
- Website: www.dioceseofcochin.org

The Indo-Portuguese Museum is a museum in Fort Kochi, Kerala, India.

== History ==
The museum was established by the efforts of the late Dr. Joseph Kureethara, Bishop of Kochi, in a bid to protect and showcase the rich cultural heritage and Portuguese influence. This museum now showcases the Portuguese influences on Fort Kochi and the surrounding areas, especially, the western parts of Kochi.

The Altar Display Hall at the Indo-Portuguese Museum

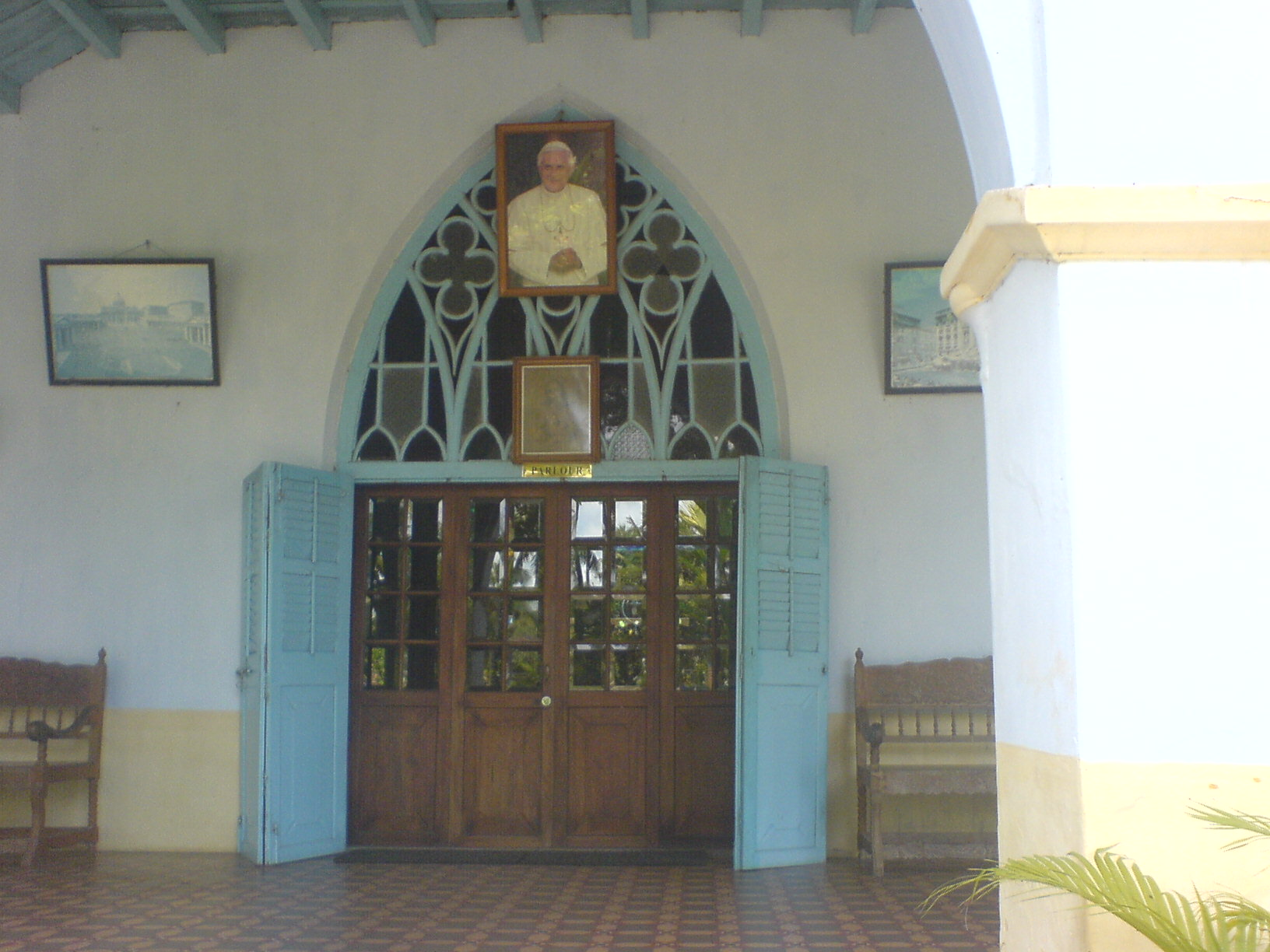
Image of Pope Benedict XVI at the Bishop's House just outside the Indo-Portuguese Museum

== Features ==
The museum has five main sections: Altar, Treasure, Procession, Civil Life and Cathedral. Among the pieces on display are a piece of the altar made in teak (16th century) from the Church of Our Lady of Hope, Vypeen; a chasuble (19th century) from Bishop's House, Fort Kochi; a processional cross, which is a combination of silver and wood (17th century) from Santa Cruz Cathedral, Fort Kochi; and an Indo-Portuguese monstrance (18–19th century) from the Church of Our Lady of Hope. Other objects on display at the Indo-Portuguese Museum are sculptures, precious metal objects and vestments, among others from the Cathedral of Santa Cruz and other churches of the Kochi diocese.

The Calouste Gulbenkian Foundation of Lisbon, Portugal, was directly involved in the selection of the artworks displayed in the Indo-Portuguese Museum of Cochin, being responsible for the museological layout. The artworks had been selected among various churches of Cochin area. The foundation also provided technical and financial assistance towards the erection of the building where the museum has been established since 2000 and has published a comprehensive catalogue, which is available at the museum.

== Location ==
The museum is located inside the compound of the Bishop's House at Fort Kochi, its geographic co-ordinates being 9°57′46.37″N 76°14′24.19″E.
