= Keralam - Museum of History and Heritage =

Coordinates: 8°30′29″N 76°57′14″E

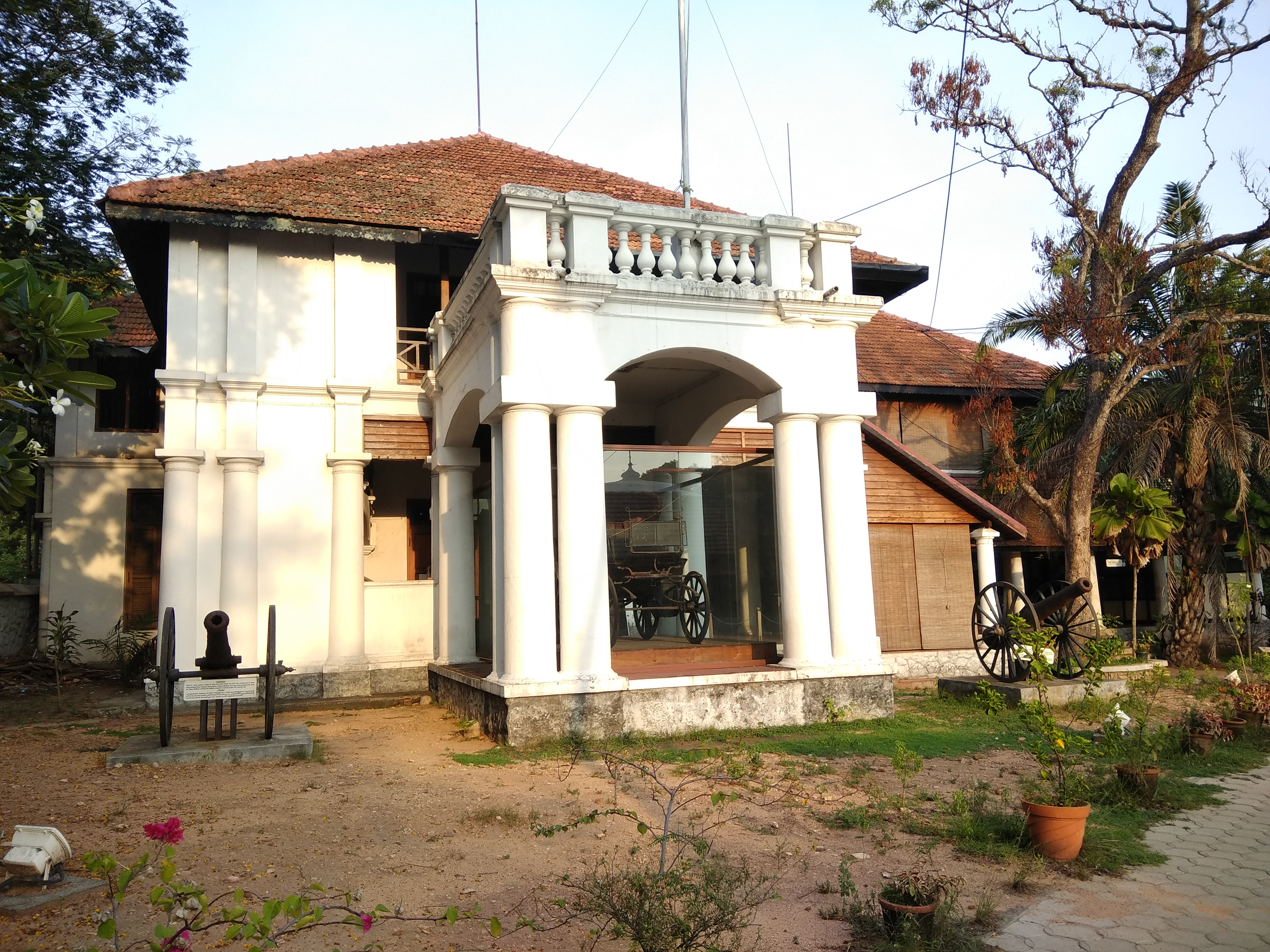
- Facade of the museum building
- Location: Thiruvananthapuram, Kerala, India

Keralam – Museum of History and Heritage, located at Thiruvananthapuram, Kerala, India is a museum that aims to document the history and heritage of Kerala that spans over 3000 years as per available prehistorical and historical evidence. It is a joint venture of Kerala Tourism and the Kerala State Department of Archaeology. The museum is placed within the Park View mansion, near the famous Napier Museum and Thiruvananthapuram Zoo. In order to enable effective content delivery and user interaction, the museum employs modern techniques such as touchscreen terminals to illustrate the exhibits and multimedia systems to render documentary videos.

== Major exhibits ==
The museum offers several attractions of historic importance, some of the major exhibits include:

- Iron Age grave goods
- Ancient Roman Coinage such as the Roman Dinari illustrating the history of ancient maritime trade between Roman Empire and the Chera empire along the Malabar coast (modern day Kerala) two millennia ago
- Palm-leaf manuscript collection in Malayalam and Sanskrit languages
- Murals from Pundareekapuram Temple, Kottayam (circa 17th century AD)
- Neolithic stone tools (celts)
- Brahma Sculpture (circa 14th century AD)
- Yoga Narasimha Murthy (circa 14th century AD)
- Nataraja Sculpture (circa 16th century AD)

== Gallery ==
Museum building

== See also ==
- Palm Leaf Manuscript Museum, Thiruvananthapuram
