= Mount Manipur Memorial =

Memorial site in the Andaman and Nicobar Islands, India

- "Mount Manipur - A Tribute to the Forgotten Patriots"
- Meitei: Manipur Chingjao Ningshing Khubham
- An image of the illustration of a building in the Mount Manipur Memorial, with a pair of statues of Meitei mythological dragon lion Kanglasha (Nongshaba). (Note: Kanglasha (Nongshaba) is a single individual deity, even though its sculptures are usually created either in dual or quadruple.)
- Type: Memorial site
- Motto: A Tribute to the Forgotten Patriots
- Location: Mount Manipur, Andaman and Nicobar Islands
- Nearest city: Port Blair
- Area: 45000 sq ft
- Designer: Designers of Huidrom Design Studios: Suresh Huidrom (Principal Designer); Nevia Laishram (Lead Architect); Ribash Akoijam (3D Visual Architect); Galaxy Pungyambam (Civil Engineer); Danny Ahongsangbam (Assistant Architect)
- Etymology: Manipur
- Owner: Government of India
- Administrator: Government of India
- Status: open
- Awards: (gold) "Gold Winner" of the International Muse Design Award 2022

The Mount Manipur Memorial is a memorial site in the Mount Manipur (formerly known as Mount Harriet) of the Andaman and Nicobar Islands, India. Spanning over an area of more than 45000 sq ft, the memorial site is dedicated to the Manipuri freedom fighters and the martyrs of the Anglo-Manipur war. In the year 2022, the memorial site won the "International Muse Design Award 2022", through the designs of the "Huidrom Design Studios" from Manipur.

== History ==
When the Anglo-Manipur War ended in the year 1891, 23 Manipuri warriors were exiled to the British penal colony in the Andaman and Nicobar Islands, including Meitei King Kulachandra Dhwaja Singh, the Maharajah of Manipur. At the time of the exile, the Cellular Jail (Kalapani) was about to be built in the island. So, Kulachandra Singh and other 22 freedom fighters were imprisoned on the Mount Manipur, in the South Andaman district.

Prior to the construction of the Mount Manipur Memorial site on the Mount Manipur, the Government of Manipur talked to the government authorities of the Andaman and Nicobar Islands to provide a piece of land to construct the memorial site for the Manipuri warriors. In the year 2019, the A&N authorities agreed to provide a piece of land near the Cellular Jail. However, due to the COVID-19 pandemic, the process of the construction got delayed. The Manipur Government was given help by the Central Government of India in the construction of the memorial site.

== Features ==
The Mount Manipur Memorial site displays and houses museum, royal sword monument, galleries, outdoor auditorium, cafeteria and gardens.

=== Sword monument ===
The "sword monument" in the Mount Manipur Memorial is a monument to commemorate the sacrifices of the freedom fighters and the martyrs in the Anglo-Manipur War. It is associated with a gallery specifically dedicated to Meitei King Kulachandra Dhaja Singh, the Maharajah of Manipur Kingdom and 22 Manipuri freedom fighters, who were exiled to the Mount Manipur from their homeland Manipur after the end of the war.

== Awards and honours ==
The Mount Manipur Memorial was designed by the Manipur-based "Huidrom Design Studios" led by designer Suresh Huidrom, Nevia Laishram as lead architect, Ribash Akoijam as 3D visual architect, Galaxy Pungyambam as civil engineer and Danny Ahongsangbam as assistant architect. It was bestowed the "International Muse Design Award 2022" in the Architectural Concept Design Competition. Afterwards, the memorial site has drawn attention to the global arena. Posting on the Twitter, the "Huidrom Design Studio" wrote as follows:

"Huidrom Design Studios is once again excited and honoured to receive the prestigious International Muse Design Award 2022 (Season2) as a GOLD WINNER for the Project Mount Manipur Memorial (Architectural Concept Design Competition). We are so blessed by the opportunity given to us by the Government of Manipur. Our special thanks to honourable CM Manipur for his incredible Vision and Ideas and for believing in us. This project design is indeed an organic design that not only the entire world recognized but also helps us leave footprints in the field of design & architecture today."

Notably, in the previous year 2021, the same studio won the Silver Medal in Muse Design Awards 2021 for the project Imphal Peace Museum. Manipur's Chief Minister Nongthombam Biren Singh posted on Twitter showing appreciations and encouragement to the architecture and the interior designing studio that brought global fame to Manipur and India, as follows:

"Proud moment for our homegrown Architecture & Interior designing firm Huidrom Design Studio on winning the Silver Medal in Muse Design Awards 2021 for the project ‘Imphal Peace Museum.’ Participants from over 100 countries were competing for the Muse Design Award 2021, New York."

== See also ==
- Mount Manipur National Park (Mount Harriet National Park)
- Imphal Peace Museum
- INA War Museum
- Kakching Garden
- Keibul Lamjao National Park - world's only floating national park in Manipur, India
- Khonghampat Orchidarium
- Loktak Folklore Museum
- Manipur State Museum
- Manipur Zoological Garden
- Phumdi - Floating biomasses in Manipur, India
- Sekta Archaeological Living Museum
- Yangoupokpi-Lokchao Wildlife Sanctuary
