= Imphal Peace Museum =

Coordinates: 24°42′19″N 93°49′03″E

- (Meitei: Imphal Aying-Achik Pukei Lankei Shanglen) (Japanese: インパール平和資料館)

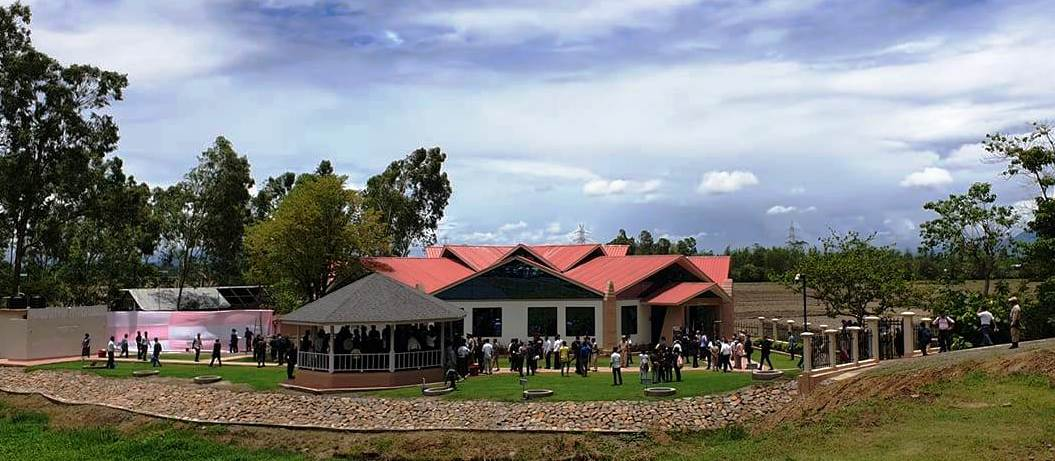
- Established: 2019; 7 years ago
- Location: At the foothills of the Red Hills (Maibam Lokpa Ching) in Imphal, Manipur, India
- Type: WWII museum
- Key holdings: WWII artefacts and documents

The Imphal Peace Museum (IPM) (Meitei: Imphal Aying-Achik Pukei Lankei Shanglen, Japanese: インパール平和資料館, romanized: Inpāru heiwa shiryōkan) is a World War II museum at the foothills of the Red Hills (Maibam Lotpa Ching) in Manipur, India. It is a living memory of the Battle of Imphal (Anglo-Japanese war) and other World War II battles (March–July 1944) fought in Manipur. It is supported by the non profit grant making Nippon Foundation (TNF), collaborating with the 2nd World War Imphal Campaign Foundation, Manipur Tourism Forum and the Government of Manipur. Notably, in a poll conducted by the British National Army Museum, the Battle of Imphal and Kohima was bestowed as Britain's Greatest Battle.

Imphal Peace Museum is the winner of India's Best Design Award in the year 2019. One of the main attractions to the museum is the display of the Japanese calligraphy of the word "平和" ("Heiwa") (English: Peace) by Shinzo Abe, the then prime minister of Japan.

== History ==
The Imphal Peace Museum (IPM) (Meitei: Imphal Aying-Achik Pukei Lankei Shanglen) was founded in the year 2019 on the 75th anniversary of the Battle of Imphal. Former British and Japanese adversaries were present in the inaugural event of the museum. Dominic Asquith, the British High Commissioner to India, and Kenji Hiramatsu, Japanese ambassador to India, attended the opening of the museum.

Imphal Peace Museum interior and exhibitions designs are one of the best works done by International Award-winning designer Suresh Huidrom (Principal Designer - Huidrom Design Studio). In 2019, the Imphal Peace Museum won India's Best Design Award for the Creativity and Innovative Interior Design. In 2021, the museum represented India at the Muse Design Awards 2021, New York City. In the event, the museum won Silver Medal in the field of Interior Design. In the same year, the museum was nominated finalist at the Society of British International Interior Design Award 2021 for the Best Interior Design in Public Space. It also got Honorary Mention at Singapore Interior Design Award 2021, Singapore and the Most Creative Interior Design of the Year 2021 by the Global Architect and Builder Awards 2021.

== Exhibitions ==
The Imphal Peace Museum has three sections.

=== First Section ===
The first section exhibits a timeline of the Battle of Imphal. The names of the casualties in the war are also shown. The names of the people of Manipur who joined the Indian National Army (INA) are also featured. The displaying war artefacts include artillery shells collected by the local people. There are also photographs of personal notes and the uniform of a Japanese soldier shown.

=== Second section ===
The second section shows the scenarios after the World War II in Manipur. It highlights the impact of the war and the process of recovery. Early television sets, photographs and cameras are also displayed.

=== Third section ===
The third section displays the art and culture of Manipur. These are shown in the forms of photographs, audiovisual features and still models.

== Accolades ==
Awards	Category	Results
India's Best Design Award 2019	Creativity and innovative interior design	Won
Muse Design Awards 2021, New York	Interior Design, Pavilions and Exhibitions	Won
Society of British International Interior Design Award 2021	Best Public Space Interior Design	Nominated
Singapore Interior Design Award 2021	Best in Exhibition Design - Permanent	Honorary Mention
Global Architect and Builder Awards 2021	Most Creative Interior Design of the Year	Won

== See also ==
- INA War Museum
- Kakching Garden
- Keibul Lamjao National Park - world's only floating national park in Manipur, India
- Khonghampat Orchidarium
- Loktak Folklore Museum
- Manipur State Museum
- Manipur Zoological Garden
- Phumdi - Floating biomasses in Manipur, India
- Sekta Archaeological Living Museum
- Yangoupokpi-Lokchao Wildlife Sanctuary
- National recognition of Meitei culture
- Classicism in Meitei civilization
- Intangible cultural heritage of Meitei civilization
- Women in Meitei civilisation
