= Sekta Archaeological Living Museum =

- Meitei: Sekta Kei
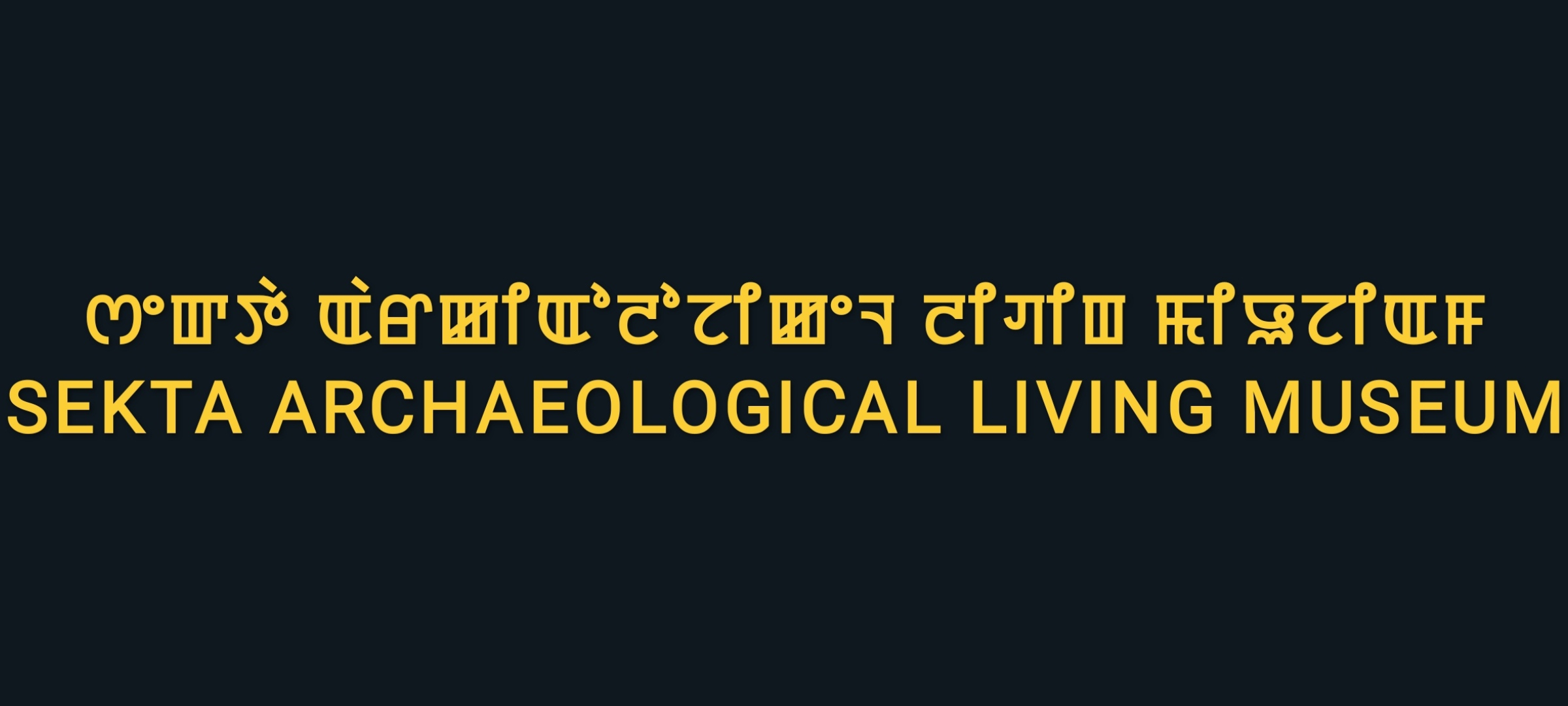
- Established: 1991
- Location: Sekta, Imphal East District, Manipur
- Coordinates: 24°53′44″N 94°02′17″E
- Type: Archaeological open air living museum

The Sekta Archaeological Living Museum (Meitei: Sekta Kei) is a museum in Sekta village in the Indian state of Manipur. It is a protected archaeological site which is one of the six mounds identified in the area. It is known for its secondary burial finds. This site was excavated by the Archaeological Survey of India in association with the State Archaeology Department of Manipur. The Department of History of the Manipur University was also associated with the excavations carried out in 1991.

== Location ==
The Sekta village where the archaeological excavation was carried out, which is now an open air living museum, is situated about 16 kilometres (9.9 mi) from Imphal and 4 kilometres (2.5 mi) north of Lamlai, on the Imphal-Ukhrul road to the northeast of Imphal on the left bank of the Iril River.

== Features ==
The Sekta archaeological site is reported to have 6 cleanly demarcated burial mounds. Of these, only one burial mound was excavated. The area covered by this mound is 0.35 acres (0.14 ha), which is now a protected site under the Archaeological Survey of India.

The excavations have unearthed finds which are identified as of the proto-Meitei tribes, one of the earliest ethnic groups of Manipur, also called the Sekta people, whose cultural practice of burying their dead in graves was revealed in which other essential items of social and economic life were also buried. With these excavations of the burial cum habitation area dated to late centuries BC, archaeologist and historians have been able to reassess the historical link to the people of Manipur. It has also been evaluated that in the burial mound more than one group of people lived with exclusive burial areas depending on their occupation. The excavations were divided, stratification wise, to seven cultural periods in succession. The finds from these consisted of different types of urn burials, which also contained several funerary items made of copper, brass and iron and a relic casket made of bell metal, or bronze of Buddhist origin.

== See also ==
- Imphal Peace Museum
- INA War Museum
- Kakching Garden
- Keibul Lamjao National Park - world's only floating national park in Manipur, India
- Khonghampat Orchidarium
- Loktak Folklore Museum
- Manipur State Museum
- Manipur Zoological Garden
- Phumdi - Floating biomasses in Manipur, India
- Yangoupokpi-Lokchao Wildlife Sanctuary

== Bibliography ==
- Advani (1991). The India Magazine of Her People and Culture. A. H. Advani.
- Birajit, Soibam (1 December 2014). Meeyamgi Kholao: Sprout of Consciousness. ARECOM ( Advanced Research Consortium, Manipur). pp. 87–. GGKEY:3Z4QYHH8K7K.
- Settar, S.; Korisettar, Ravi (1 January 2002). Indian Archaeology in Retrospect: Archaeology and historiography: history, theory, and method. Indian Council of Historical Research. ISBN 978-81-7304-322-2.
- Singh, E. Ishwarjit (1 January 2005). Manipur, a Tourist Paradise. B.R. Publishing Corporation. ISBN 978-81-7646-506-9.
