= INA War Museum =

- (Meitei: India Leipaak-ki Laanmi-gi Pukei Lankei Shanglen)
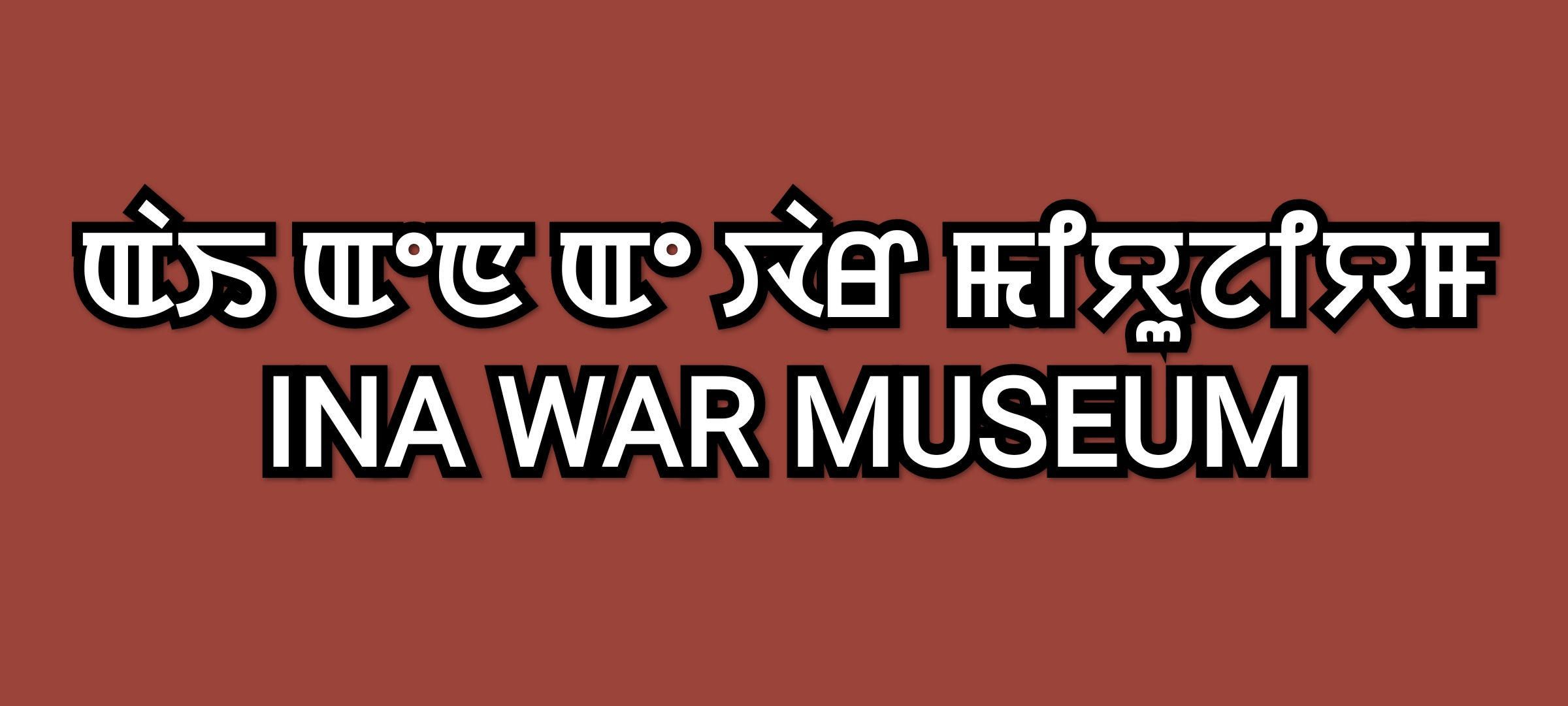

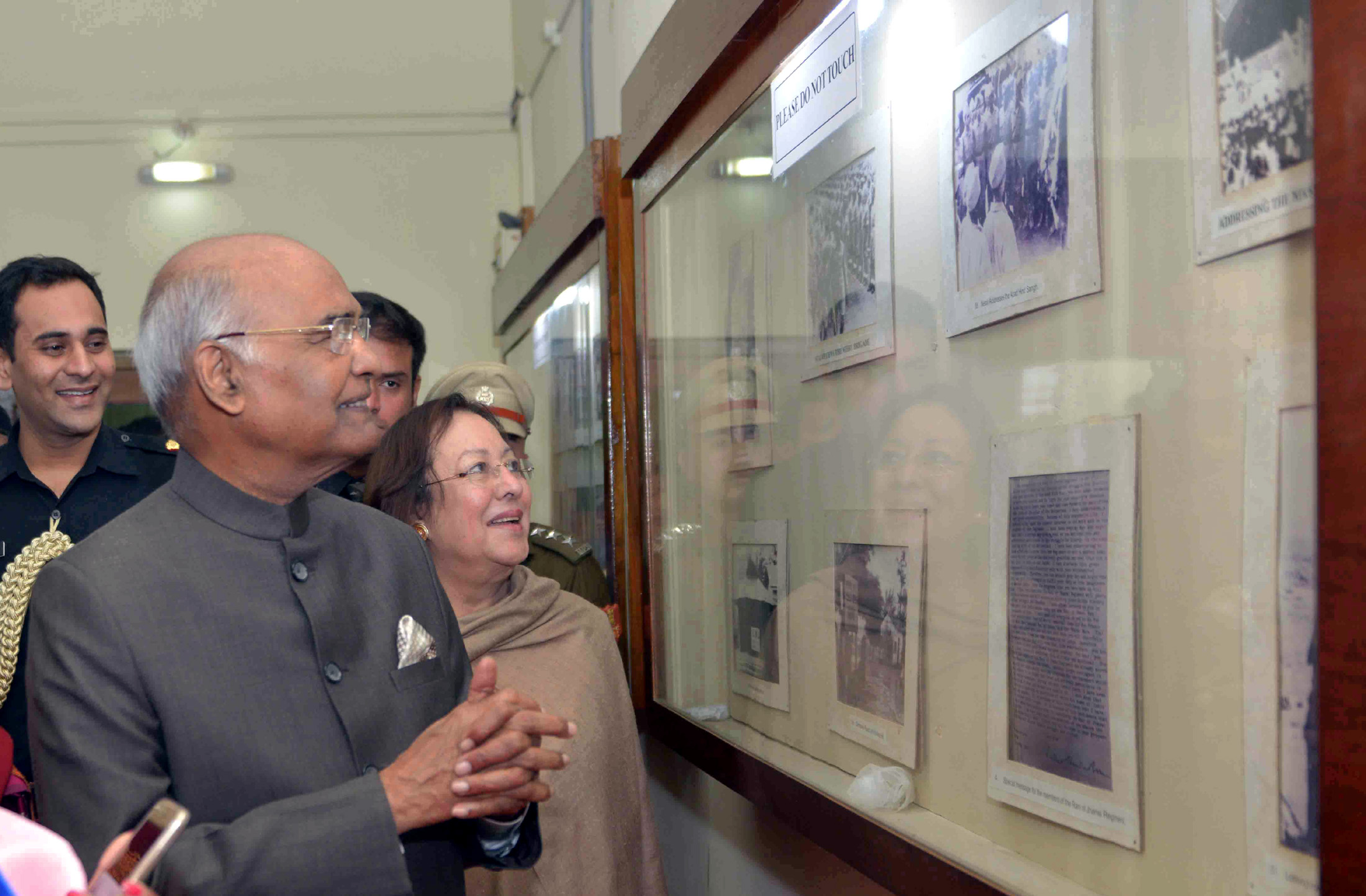
- Shri Ram Nath Kovind, the President of India and Dr. Najma Heptulla, the then Governor of Manipur, visiting the INA Museum, at Moirang, in Manipur on November 22, 2017.
- Established: 1985; 40 years ago
- Location: INA Martyrs' Memorial Complex, Moirang, Bishnupur District, Manipur
- Type: War museum
- Key holdings: Hundreds of rare photographs of Netaji Subhash Chandra Bose and the INA maps, insignia, currency notes, Netaji's letters, INA badges and Japanese amulets
- Collection size: More than 1000 WWII related objects and documents
- Curator: Mrinashree Mairembam
- Owner: Government of Manipur

The INA War Museum (Meitei: INA Laan-gi Pukei Lankei Shanglen) or the Indian National Army War Museum (Meitei: India Leipaak-ki Laanmi-gi Pukei Lankei Shanglen) is a WWII museum in Moirang, Manipur. It is the only official WWII museum in Manipur though many other WWII museums are opened in the state. This museum is situated inside the INA Memorial Complex. The museum focuses primarily on the rise of the Indian National Army (INA) and the contributions of Subhash Chandra Bose to the Indian independence movement. This museum is the only official museum dedicated to Netaji Subhash Chandra Bose.

== History ==
Moirang is the first place in Indian soil where the Indian national tricolour flag was hoisted. It was in this place where the INA War Museum and the INA Martyrs' Memorial Complex were developed. The INA War Museum was established in the year 1985. It was in tribute to Subhash Chandra Bose for his roles in the Indian Freedom Struggle.

== Collections and features ==
The Indian National Army War Museum displays artefacts and relics of WWII found from various locations in Manipur. These relics dating back to 1944 include arms and ammunition, bayonets, helmets and other documents. It also displays hundreds of rare photographs of Netaji Subhash Chandra Bose and the INA, maps, insignia, currency notes, Netaji's letters, INA badges and Japanese amulets.

== Exhibits ==
The INA museum exhibits a gallery of historical personalities of Manipur including Manipuri soldiers in the Indian National Army.

== See also ==
- Imphal Peace Museum
- Kakching Garden
- Keibul Lamjao National Park - world's only floating national park in Manipur, India
- Khonghampat Orchidarium
- Loktak Folklore Museum
- Manipur State Museum
- Manipur Zoological Garden
- Phumdi - Floating biomasses in Manipur, India
- Sekta Archaeological Living Museum
- Yangoupokpi-Lokchao Wildlife Sanctuary
