= Yangoupokpi-Lokchao Wildlife Sanctuary =

Wildlife sanctuary in Manipur

- (Meitei: Yangoupokpi-Lokchao Lamlak-ki Saa-Ngaa Ngaak Senpham)
- IUCN category IV (habitat/species management area)
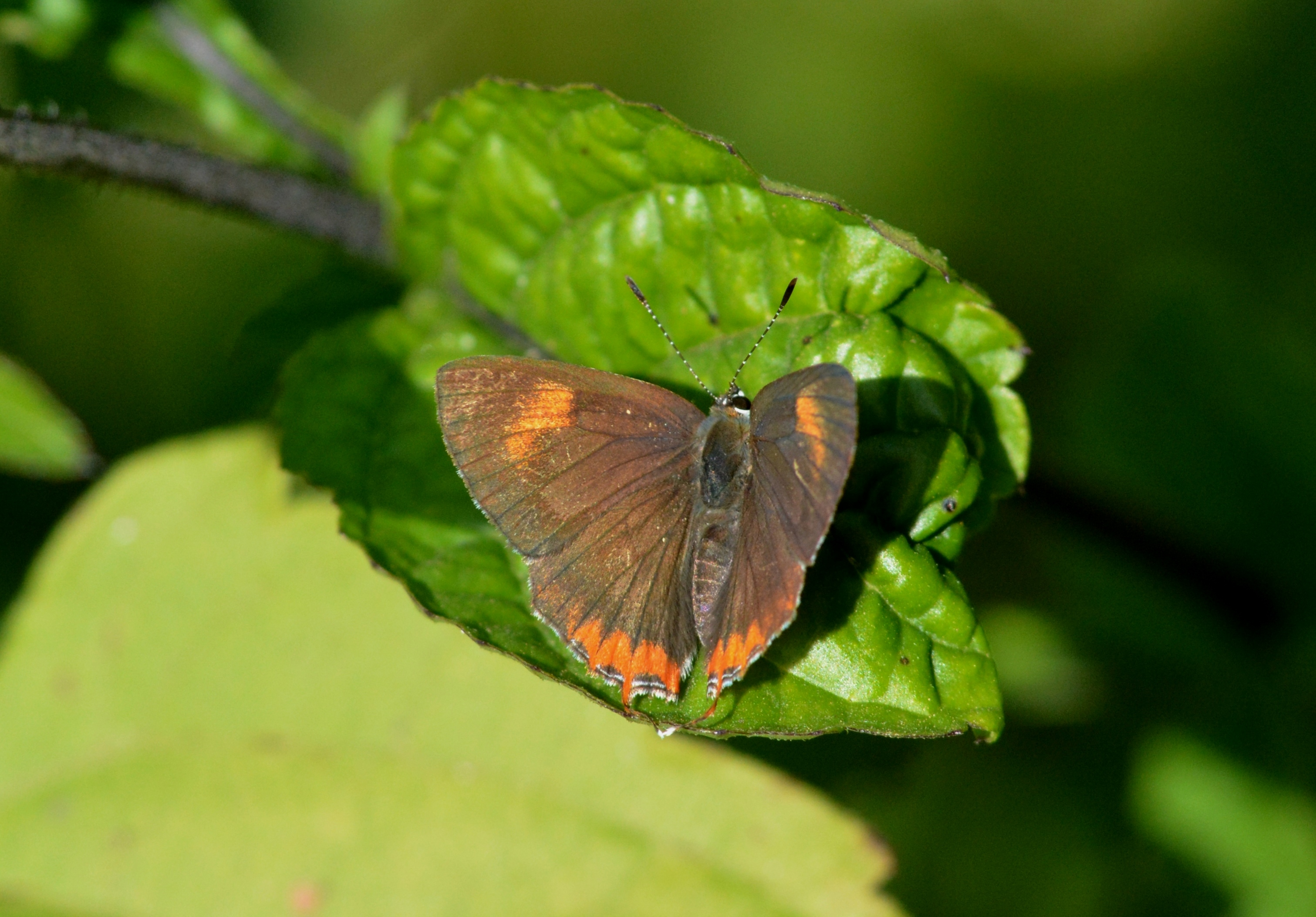
- Purple Sapphire (Heliophorus epicles) in the Yangoupokpi-Lokchao Wildlife Sanctuary, Manipur

- Location within Manipur Location within India
- Interactive map of Yangoupokpi-Lokchao Wildlife Sanctuary
- Location: Chandel district, Manipur
- Nearest city: Imphal
- Coordinates: 24.32°N 94.23°E
- Area: 184.80 km^{2} (71.35 sq mi)
- Established: 1989; 37 years ago
- Governing body: Government of Manipur

Yangoupokpi-Lokchao Wildlife Sanctuary (Meitei: Yangoupokpi-Lokchao Lamlak-ki Saa-Ngaa Ngaak Senpham) is an Indo-Burma wildlife sanctuary in Chandel district of Manipur. It is in the Indo-Myanmar border about 110 km from Imphal. It has an area of 184.80 square kilometers.

The ecosystem of this wildlife sanctuary is unique and vibrant. It represents the Indo-Myanmar biological diversity (Indo-Burma). It is because of the strategic location of the wildlife sanctuary in the meeting point of the two major geographical zones, India and Myanmar (Burma).

== History ==
Yangoupokpi-Lokchao Wildlife Sanctuary was established in the year 1989.

== Fauna ==
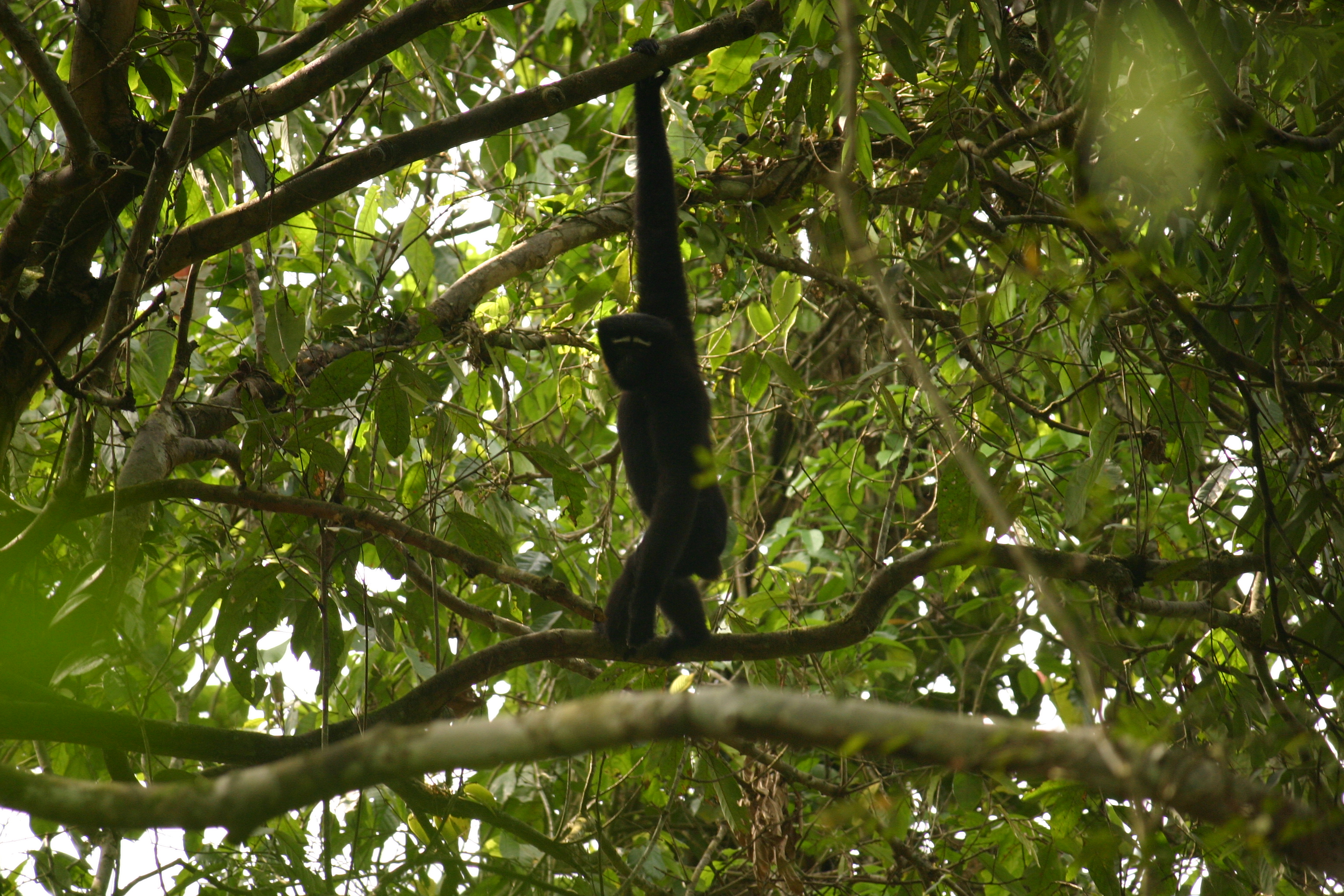
Hoolock gibbon hanging on a tree branch.

Hoolock gibbon (Meitei: "Yongmoo" or "Yongmu") is the only ape species found in India. It lives in this wildlife sanctuary. Others include wild bear (Meitei: Lamlakki Sawom), Himalayan Black Bear (Meitei: Himalayagi Amuba Sawom), Malayan Sun Bear (Meitei: Malayagi Numit Sawom), Slow loris (Meitei: "Yong Ikaithibi") or (Meitei: "Loudraubi"), Stump-tailed macaque, Serow, Indian Civet cat, Common otter (Eurasian otter), pangolin, leopard (Meitei: Kabokkei). Sometimes, elephants (Meitei: Shamu) also migrated from the Indo-Myanmar border.

== Visiting seasons ==
The best season to visit the sanctuary is from October to April. The best time to visit is during the early morning.

== Rest houses ==
There are some rest houses in and around the sanctuary. These are: (1) Forest Rest House, Moreh, (2) Indo-Myanmar Trade Center Rest House, Moreh, (3) Transit Camp at Wildlife Office, Moreh.

== See also ==
- Imphal Peace Museum
- INA War Museum
- Kakching Garden
- Keibul Lamjao National Park - world's only floating national park in Manipur, India
- Khonghampat Orchidarium
- Loktak Folklore Museum
- Manipur State Museum
- Manipur Zoological Garden
- Mizoram–Manipur–Kachin rain forests
- Phumdi - Floating biomasses in Manipur, India
- Sekta Archaeological Living Museum
