= Khonghampat Orchidarium =

Botanical garden in Manipur, India

Khonghampat Orchidarium (Meitei: Khonghampat Urei Leikol)
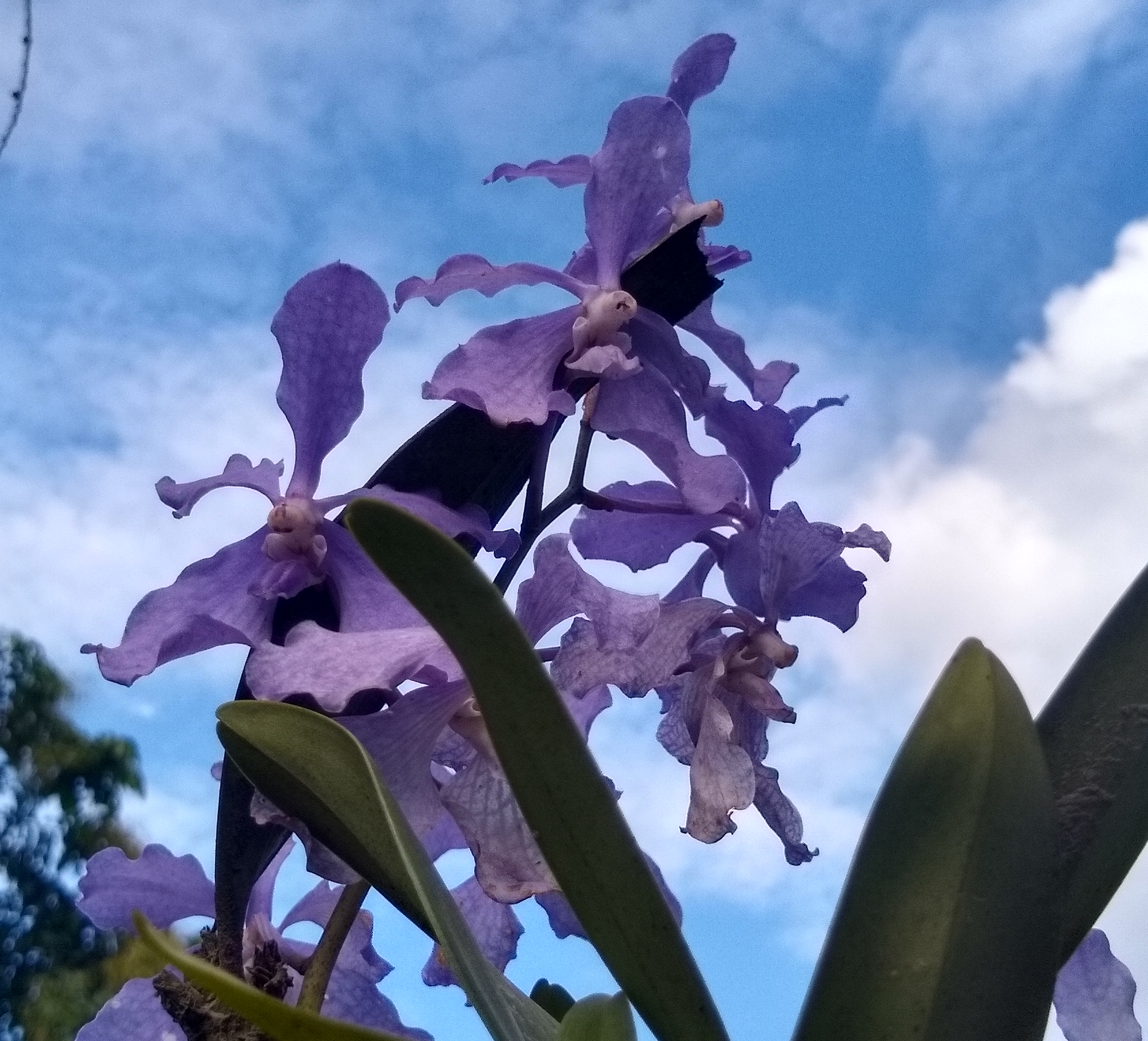
- Type: Botanical Garden, Orchidarium
- Location: Khonghampat, Imphal, Manipur, India
- Area: 200 acres (81 ha)
- Opened: 1976
- Owned by: Manipur Forest Department
- Species: 500
- Collections: 500 orchid species including many from genera - Dendrobium, Vanda and Rhynchostylis

The Khonghampat Orchidarium (Meitei: Khonghampat Urei Leikol) is a botanical garden in Imphal, Manipur, India. It is dedicated to the collection, cultivation, preservation and display of a wide range of 500 varieties of orchids found in Manipur. It houses some of the rarest orchids in the world. The peak blooming season of the orchid flowers is from April to July. The finest visiting season is March to April. This Orchidarium is the orchid centre of the Forest Department of Manipur.

== History ==
The Khonghampat Orchidarium (Meitei: Khonghampat Urei Leikol) was founded by the Manipur Forest Department in the year 1976.

== Features ==
The Khonghampat Orchidarium (Meitei: Khonghampat Urei Leikol) covers an area of 200 acres of land.

Predominant genera of the orchid species grown in the orchidarium include Vanda, Dendrobium and Rhynchostylis. A few of the species are the following:

Orchid species	Local names	Latin Roman transliterations	Images
Vanda ampullacea (Ascocentrum ampullaceum)	ꯅꯥꯆꯣꯝ ꯂꯩ	Nachom Lei	
Dendrobium chrysotoxum	ꯈꯣꯉꯨꯃꯦꯂꯩ	Khongumelei	
Dendrobium chrysanthum	ꯃꯦꯔꯥ ꯂꯩꯈꯝ	Mera Leikham	
Dendrobium moschatum	ꯏꯉꯥꯂꯩ (ꯏꯉꯦꯂꯩ)	Engallei (Engellei, Ingallei, Ingellei)	
Dendrobium pendulum	ꯇꯥꯡꯀꯛꯂꯩ	Tangkaklei	
Dendrobium wardianum	ꯌꯦꯔꯨꯝ ꯂꯩ ꯇꯥꯡꯖꯧꯕꯤ	Yerum Lei Tangjoubi	
Rhynchostylis retusa	ꯁꯝꯖꯤꯔꯩ	Samjirei	
Vanda coerulea	ꯀ꯭ꯋꯥꯛꯂꯩ	Kwaklei	

== See also ==
- Imphal Peace Museum
- INA War Museum
- Kakching Garden
- Keibul Lamjao National Park - world's only floating national park in Manipur, India
- Loktak Folklore Museum
- Manipur State Museum
- Manipur Zoological Garden
- Phumdi - Floating biomasses in Manipur, India
- Sekta Archaeological Living Museum
- Yangoupokpi-Lokchao Wildlife Sanctuary
