= Manipur Zoological Garden =

Coordinates: 24°49′01″N 93°53′28″E

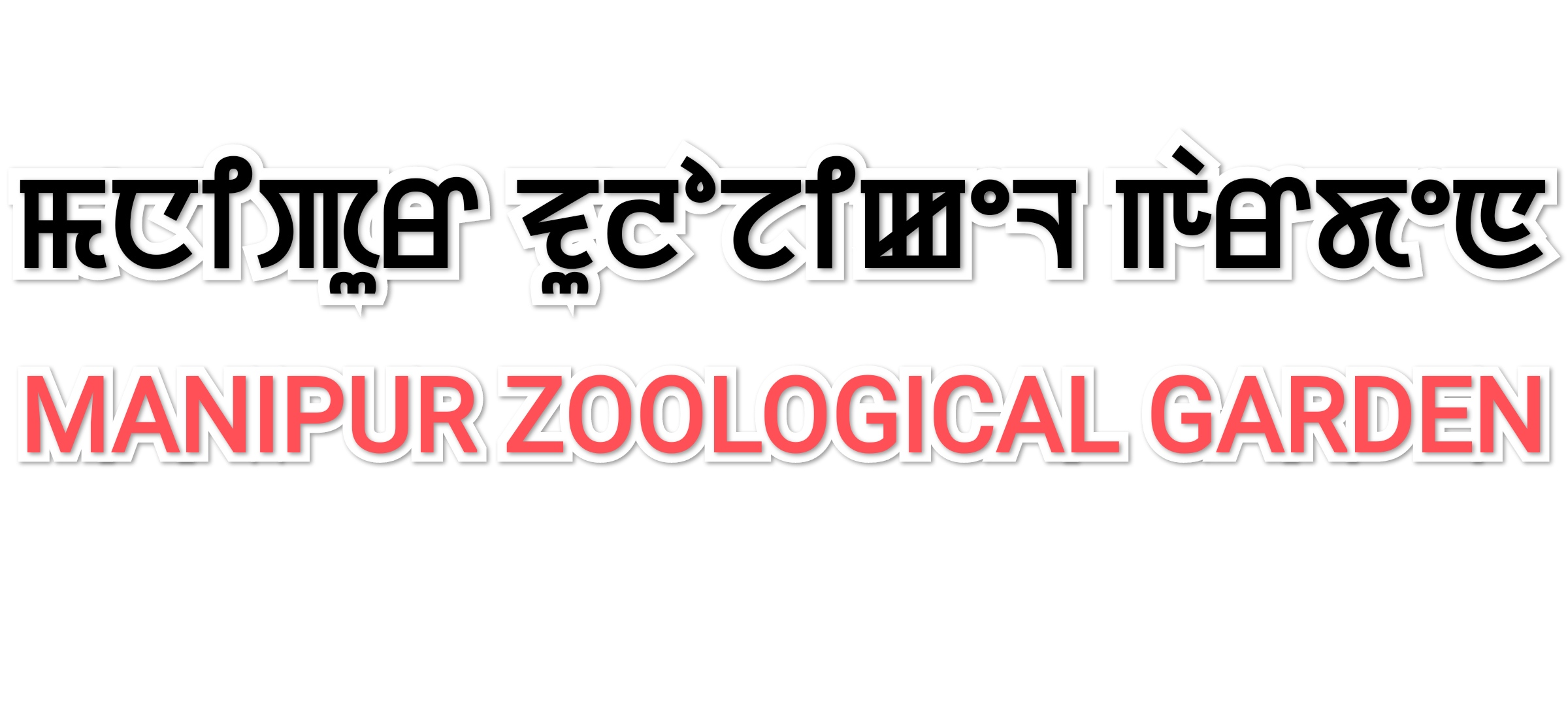

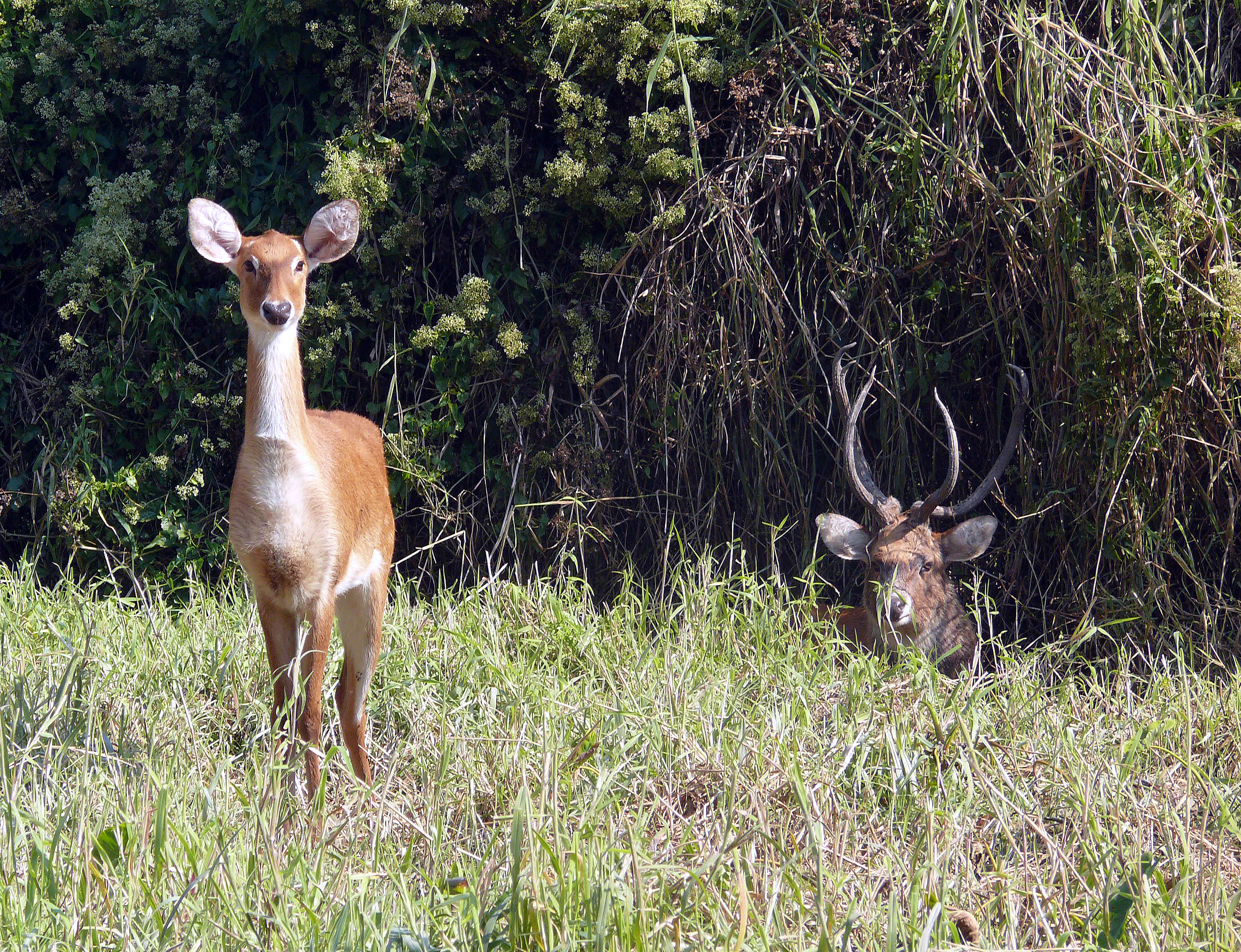
- Two Sangais in Manipur Zoological Garden, Imphal, Manipur
- Interactive map of Manipur Zoological Garden
- Date opened: 2 October 1976
- Location: Iroisemba, Imphal West District
- Land area: 68 hectares
- No. of species: 400

Manipur Zoological Garden (Meitei: Manipur Sha-Uchek Thampham) is a zoo in Iroisemba, Manipur. It is the second habitat of Sangai (Cervus eldi eldi), the world's only dancing deer species, after the Keibul Lamjao National Park, the world's only floating national park. It is a medium sized zoological garden. It houses Schedule 1 species of amphibians, birds, mammals and reptiles. The animals kept in the zoo are mostly endemic to Manipur. The Central Zoo Authority of India recognized it as the coordinating zoo for the conservation breeding center of Sangai and Serow (Meitei: Sabeng).

The best time to visit the zoo during summer is from April to September. The best time during Winter is from October to March. Monday is usually closed.

== History ==
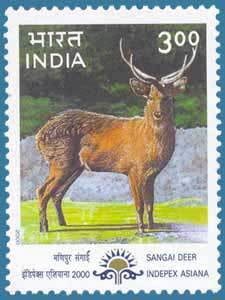
The Sangai deer illustration in a stamp of India

The Manipur Zoological Garden was established on 2 October 1976.

== Location ==
The Manipur Zoological Garden is located in Iroisemba town along the Imphal-Kangchup road. It is in the Imphal West District. It is 5–6 km away from Imphal.

== Features ==
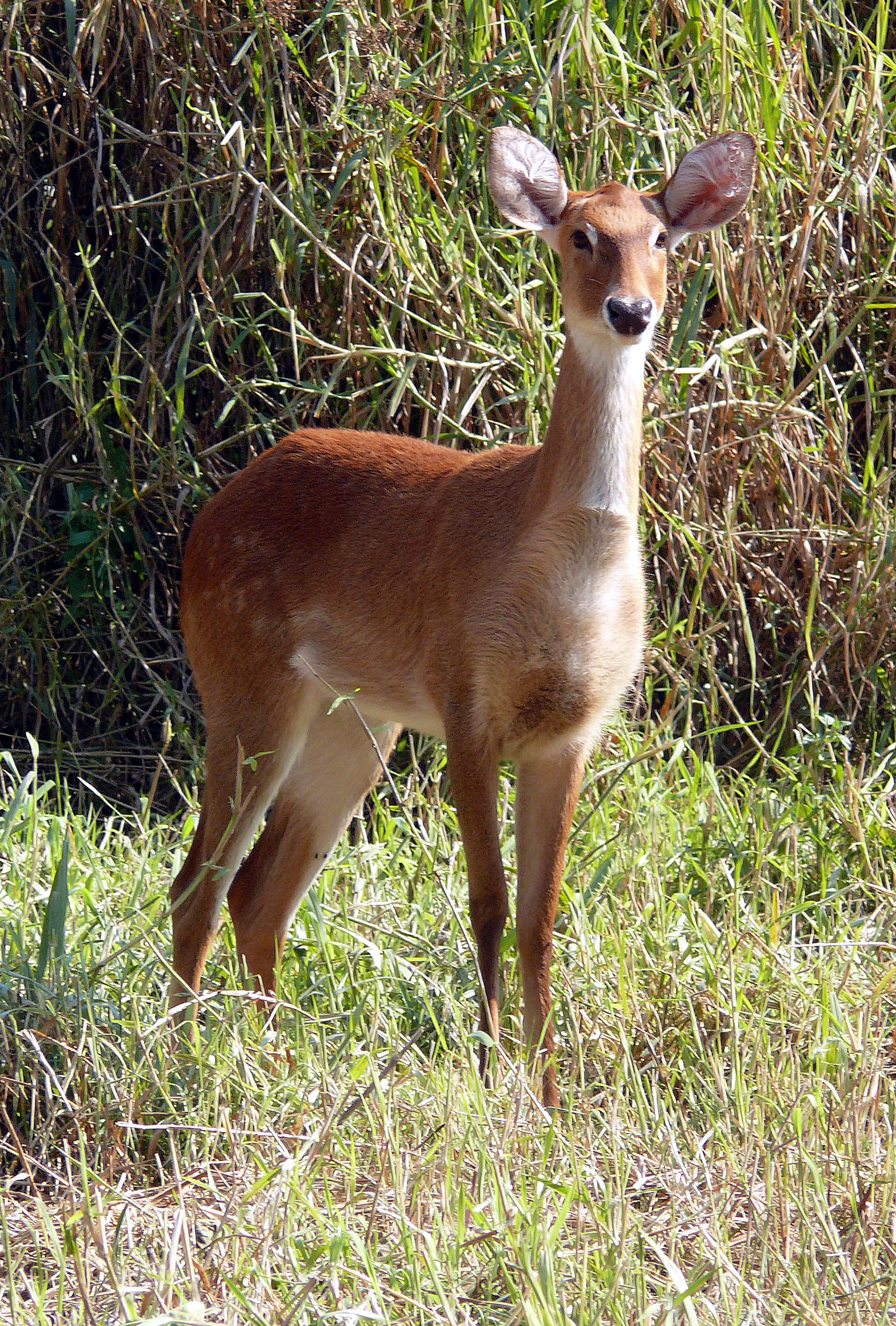
A Sangai deer in the Manipur Zoological Garden

The zoo offers its visitors to have an opportunity to see the graceful Sangai, the brow antlered deer. This deer is one of the rarest and one of the most endangered species in the world. This zoo is located at the foothills of the pine growing hillocks in the westernmost corner of Lamphelpat.

== Conservation ==
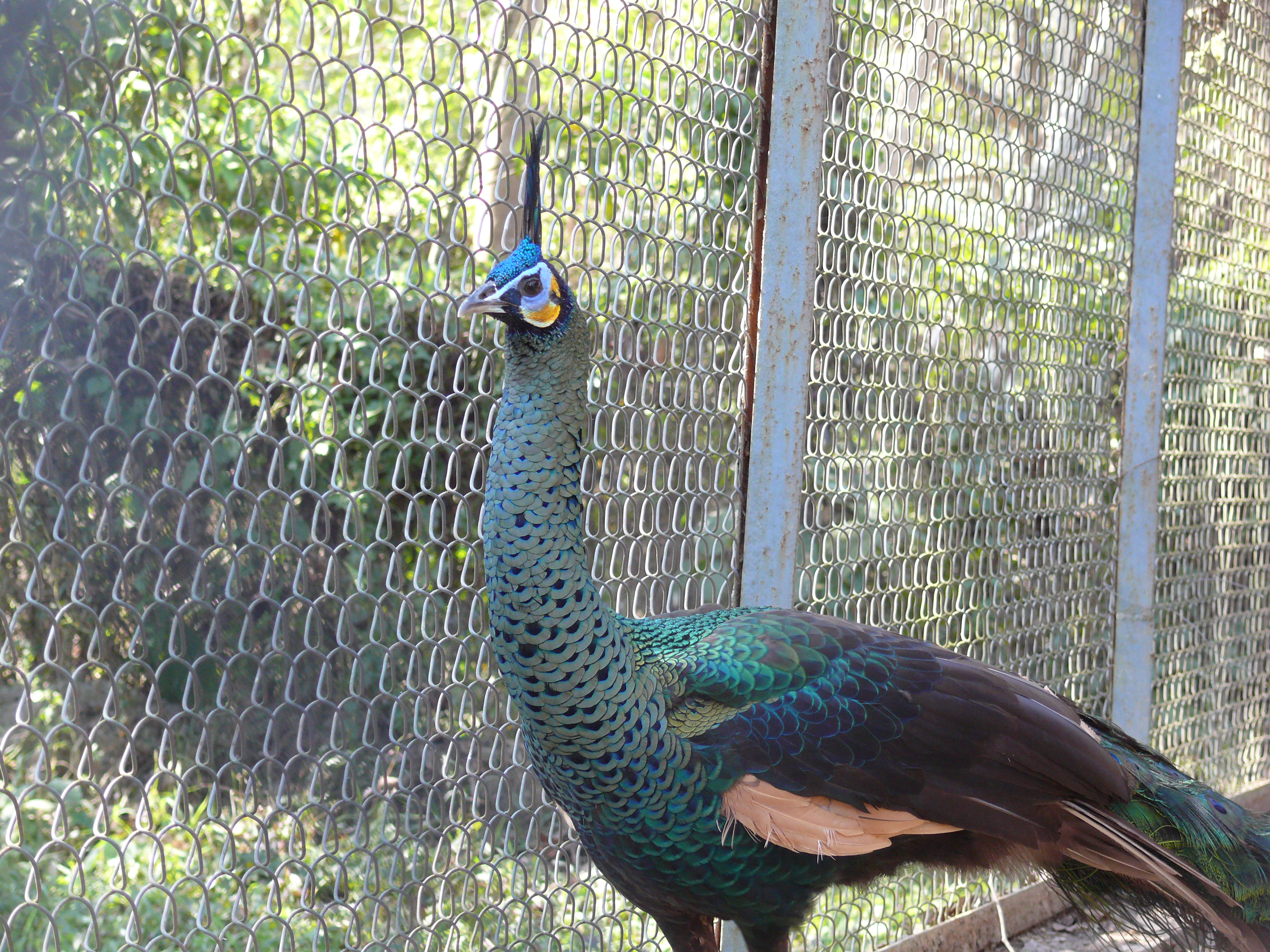
A Green Peafowl (Pavo muticus) in the Manipur Zoological Garden

It is an in situ conservation center of 45 endangered mammals, reptiles and birds. Many Schedule 1 species of mammals, reptiles, birds and amphibians are kept in the zoo. The animals endemic to Manipur are kept in the zoo. It is recognised as the coordinating zoo for the conservation breeding center of Sangai and Serow (Meitei: Sabeng) by the Central Zoo Authority of India.

== See also ==
- Imphal Peace Museum
- INA War Museum
- Kakching Garden
- Keibul Lamjao National Park - world's only floating national park in Manipur, India
- Khonghampat Orchidarium
- Loktak Folklore Museum
- Manipur State Museum
- Phumdi - Floating biomasses in Manipur, India
- Sekta Archaeological Living Museum
- Yangoupokpi-Lokchao Wildlife Sanctuary
