= Sekta =

Sekta is a village in the Imphal East district of Manipur, India. Sekta Archaeological Living Museum is situated in the village.
