= Thanga =

Thanga (Meitei pronunciation: /tʰáŋ.gə/) is an island village in the Loktak lake located in the Bishnupur district in the state of Manipur, India. In 2001, the population was 13085. 6514 were male. 6571 were female. The main occupation of this village is fishing. It is 55 km from Imphal, capital of Manipur.
