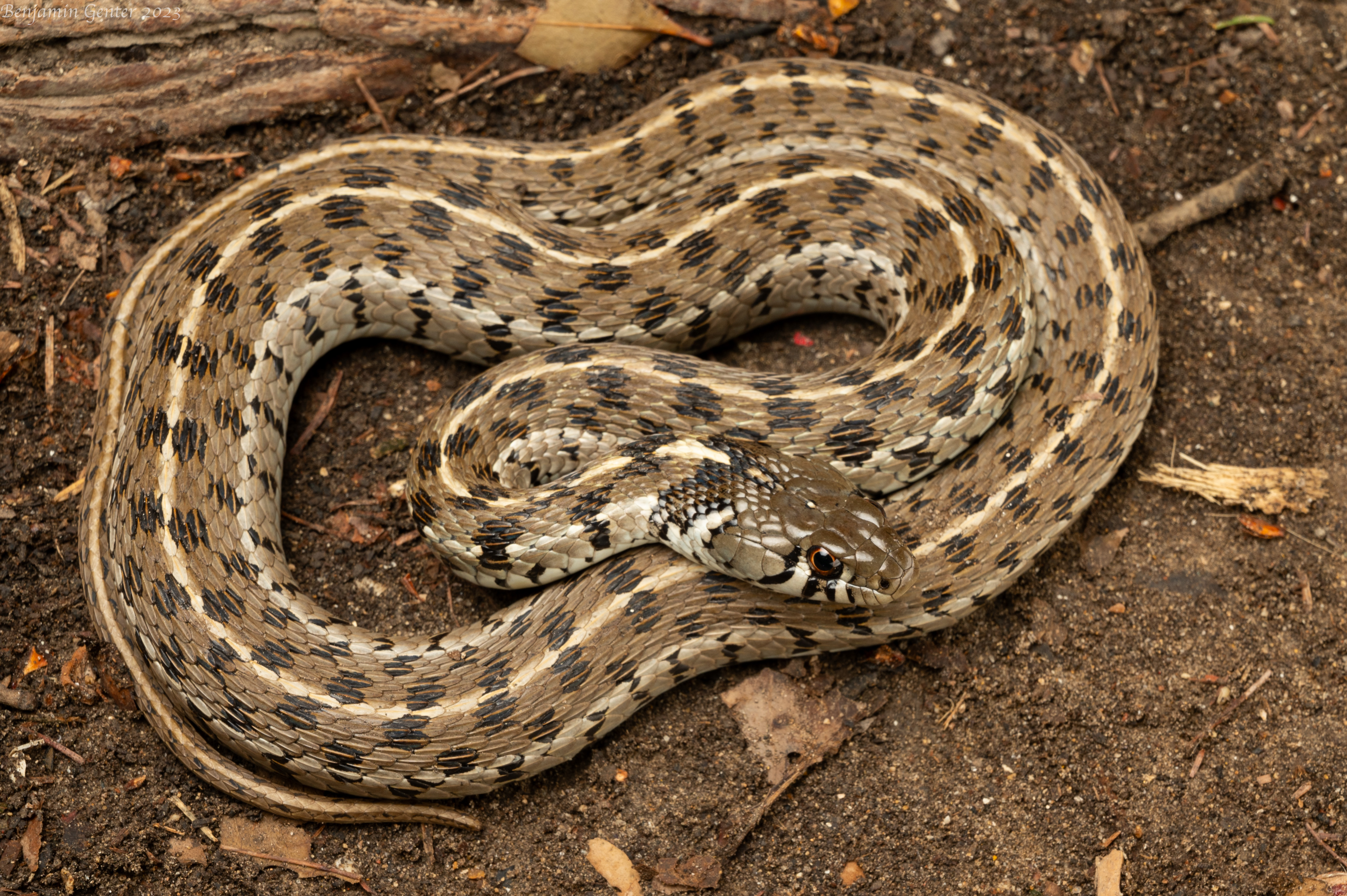

Conservation status
- Least Concern (IUCN 3.1)

Scientific classification
- Kingdom: Animalia
- Phylum: Chordata
- Class: Reptilia
- Order: Squamata
- Suborder: Serpentes
- Family: Colubridae
- Genus: Thamnophis
- Species: T. marcianus

Binomial name
- Thamnophis marcianus (Baird & Girard, 1853)
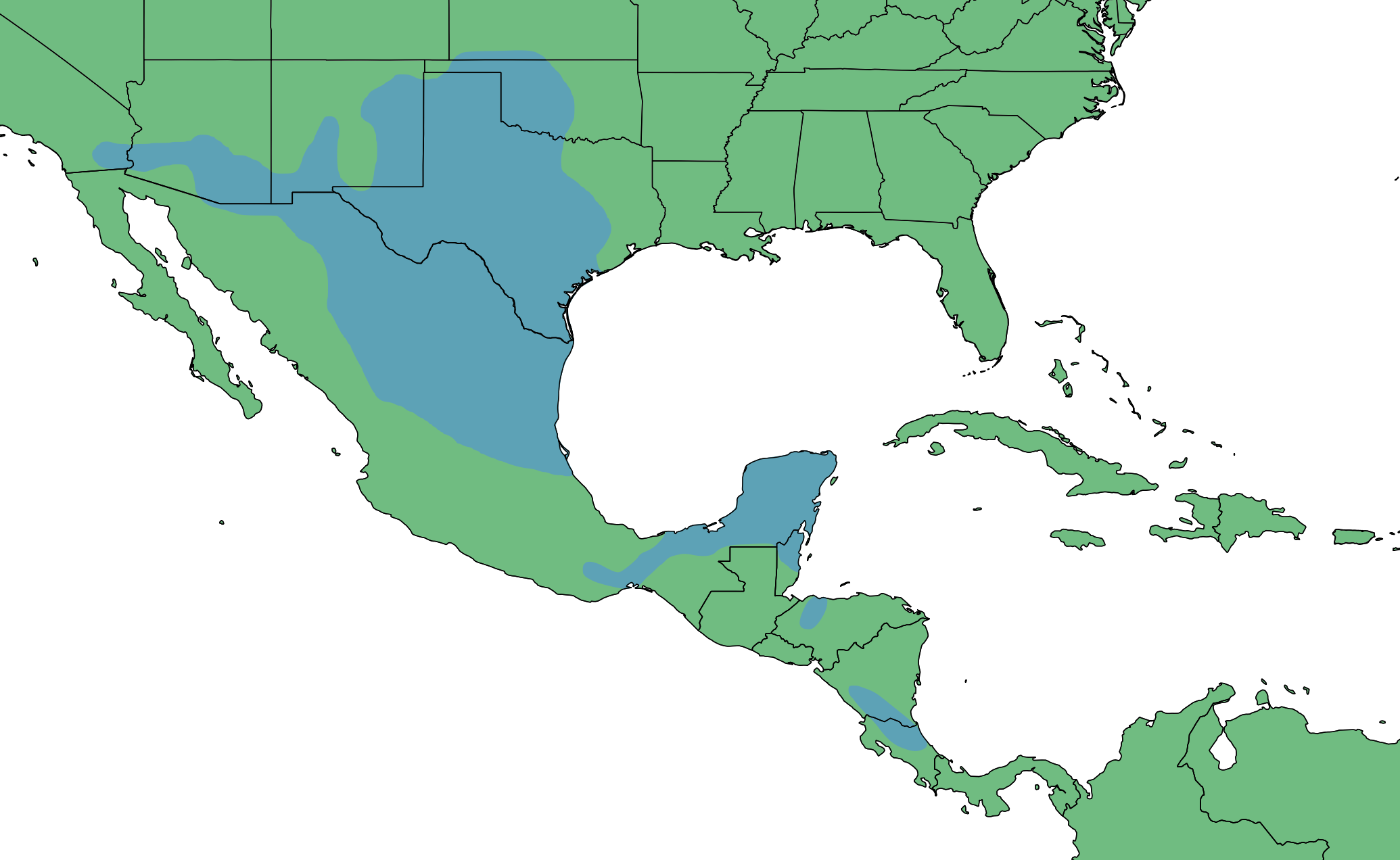

Synonyms
- Eutainia marciana Baird & Girard, 1853; Eutaenia marciana — Bocourt, 1893; Thamnophis marcianus — Ruthven, 1907

= Checkered garter snake =

Species of snake

The checkered garter snake (Thamnophis marcianus) is a species of garter snake in the subfamily Natricinae of the family Colubridae. The species is native to the southwestern United States, Mexico, and Central America. There are two recognized subspecies.

== Etymology ==
The specific epithet marcianus is in honor of American Brigadier General Randolph B. Marcy, who led surveying expeditions to the frontier areas in the mid-19th century.

== Description ==
The checkered garter snake is typically greenish in color, with a distinct, black checkerboard pattern down its back. It is capable of growing to a total length (tail included) of 42 inches (107 cm), but is usually 18 to 24 inches (46 to 61 cm).

== Habitat ==
The preferred natural habitats of Thamnophis marcianus are desert, grassland, shrubland, and forest, usually close to water, at altitudes from sea level to 2,200 m (7,200 ft).

== Diet ==
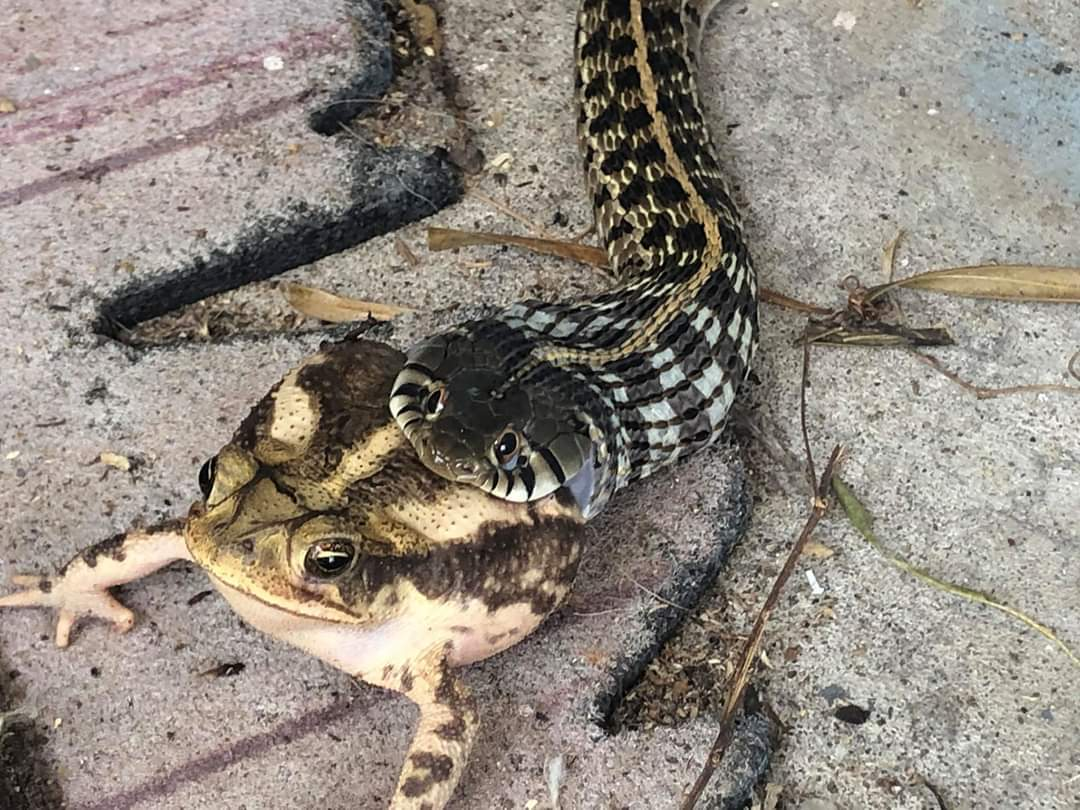
Eating a Gulf Coast toad

The diet of Thamnophis marcianus includes small frogs, toads, small fish, and earthworms. If kept as a pet, it can be trained on live or freeze-thawed mice, but even so, it is a fussy eater and can suddenly start to refuse mice at any point.

== Behavior ==
Unlike most garter snakes, the checkered garter snake is partially nocturnal.

== Defensive behavior ==
Thamnophis marcianus will release a foul-smelling liquid from its cloaca onto attackers. they do not strike or attack.

== Reproduction ==
Thamnophis marcianus is ovoviviparous and may be parthenogenetic.

== Venom ==
Thamnophis marcianus was long thought to be nonvenomous, but recent discoveries have revealed that it does in fact produce a mild neurotoxic venom. T. marcianus cannot kill humans with the small amount of venom it produces, which is comparatively mild, and it also lacks an effective means of delivering it. It does have enlarged teeth in the back of the mouth, but its gums are significantly larger. The Duvernoy's gland of a garter snake is posterior to (to the rear of) the snake's eye. The mild venom is spread into wounds through a chewing action.

== Subspecies ==
Two subspecies of Thamnophis marcianus are recognized as being valid, including the nominotypical subspecies.

- T. m. marcianus (Baird & Girard, 1853) - Checkered garter snake - this subspecies shares a similar range to that of T. m. praeocularis.
- T. m. praeocularis (Bocourt, 1892) - Marcy's Checkered garter snake - This subspecies inhabits a small southeastern section of California, southeast Arizona, southeast and west New Mexico, western Texas and Oklahoma, and a small section of southwest Kansas. In Mexico, it inhabits a small section of northern Baja California, northern Chihuahua, Coahuila, Nuevo Leon, Tamaulipas, northern Durango and Zacatecas, as well as tiny sections of northern San Lois Potisi and Veracruz.

Nota bene: A trinomial authority in parentheses indicates that the subspecies was originally described in a genus other than Thamnophis.

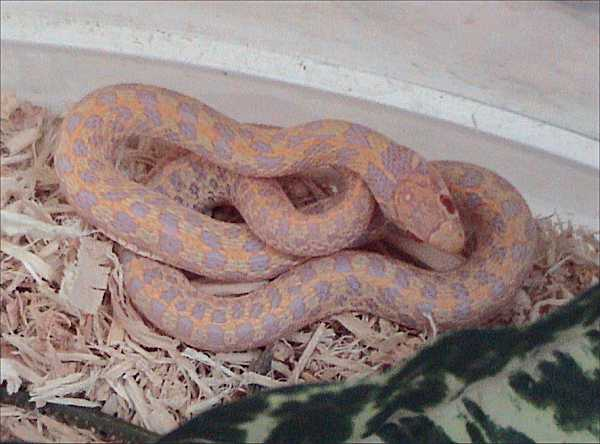
Albino checkered garter snake

== In captivity ==
The checkered garter snake is one of the easiest garter snakes to tame. Even a wild-caught one can become tame in a few days if handled carefully. The checkered garter snake is frequently available in the exotic pet trade, and makes a hardy captive animal. It can be trained to accept mice or fish fillets as food. Captive breeding, while not common, is done, and albino variants are being produced.
