= Keibul Lamjao National Park =

National park in Manipur, India

- IUCN category II (national park)
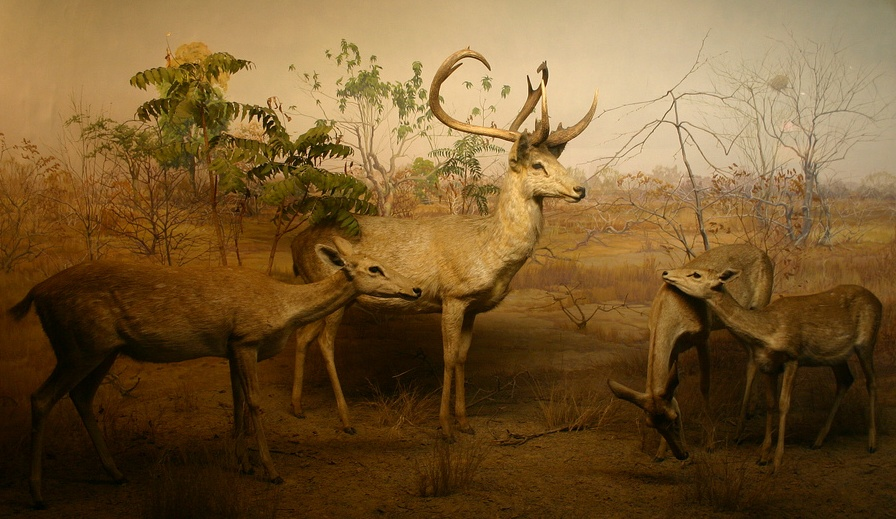
- Endangered Sangai deer (Cervus eldi eldi)

- Location within Manipur Location within India
- Interactive map of Keibul Lamjao National Park
- Location: Bishnupur District, Manipur, India
- Nearest city: Moirang, Imphal
- Coordinates: 24°30′00″N 93°46′00″E
- Area: 40 km^{2} (15 sq mi)
- Established: 28 March 1977; 49 years ago
- Governing body: Government of India, Government of Manipur
- Website: web.archive.org/web/20081015170951/http://manipurforest.gov.in/KeibulLamjao.htm

The Keibul Lamjao National Park (Meitei: Keibul Lamjao Leipakki Lampak) is a national park in the Bishnupur district of the state of Manipur in Northeast India. It is 40 km^{2} (15.4 mi^{2}) in area, the only floating national park in the world, and an integral part of Loktak Lake. It is currently on the tentative lists of the UNESCO World Heritage Sites, under the title "Keibul Lamjao Conservation Area (KLCA)", additionally covering the buffer of Loktak Lake (140 sq km) and Pumlen Pat (43 sq. km).

The national park is characterized by floating decomposed plant material locally called phumdi. It was created in 1966 as a wildlife sanctuary to preserve the natural habitat of the endangered Eld's deer (Cervus eldi eldi), which is the state animal of Manipur. In 1977, it was gazetted as national park.

== History ==
Keibul Lamjao National Park was declared a wildlife sanctuary in 1969 and became a national park in 1977.

== Geography and topography ==
The park is a swamp with floating mass of vegetation created by accrual of organic detritus and biomass with soil particles that has been thickened into a solid form called phumdis, at the south–eastern side of the Loktak Lake, which has been declared a Ramsar site. Two thirds to three fourths of the total park area is formed by phumdis. A waterway through the park provides year-round access by boats plying through the Loktak Lake, to the Pabot Hill in the north. The reserve area of the park which was 4,000 ha (9,884.2 acres) in March 1997 was reduced to 2,160 ha (5,337.5 acres) in April 1998, under pressure from the local villagers. The swamp encompasses three hills, namely, Pabot, Toya and Chingjao that provide a refuge for the large mammals during the monsoon season. The distinctive nature of the park is that it is "too deep to be marsh, too shallow to be a lake".

=== Ownership rights ===
While the area on the periphery of the park is privately owned, the park itself is predominantly state-owned.

== Hydrologic features ==
The size of the park varies with the seasons as it is formed of phumdis, a morass of organic matter. The peripheral areas of the lake are grounded to the bed of the lake during the dry season but get almost substantially submerged for a few days during the monsoon season. It emerges and floats to the surface fully a few days later, separating from the ground; the depth of the phumdi varies from 0.30 to 1.22 m (1 to 4 ft), and during this period the animals in the park move to higher hilly areas. About twenty percent of its thickness floats on the lake, above the surface, which supports the weight of large mammals.

== Flora and fauna ==
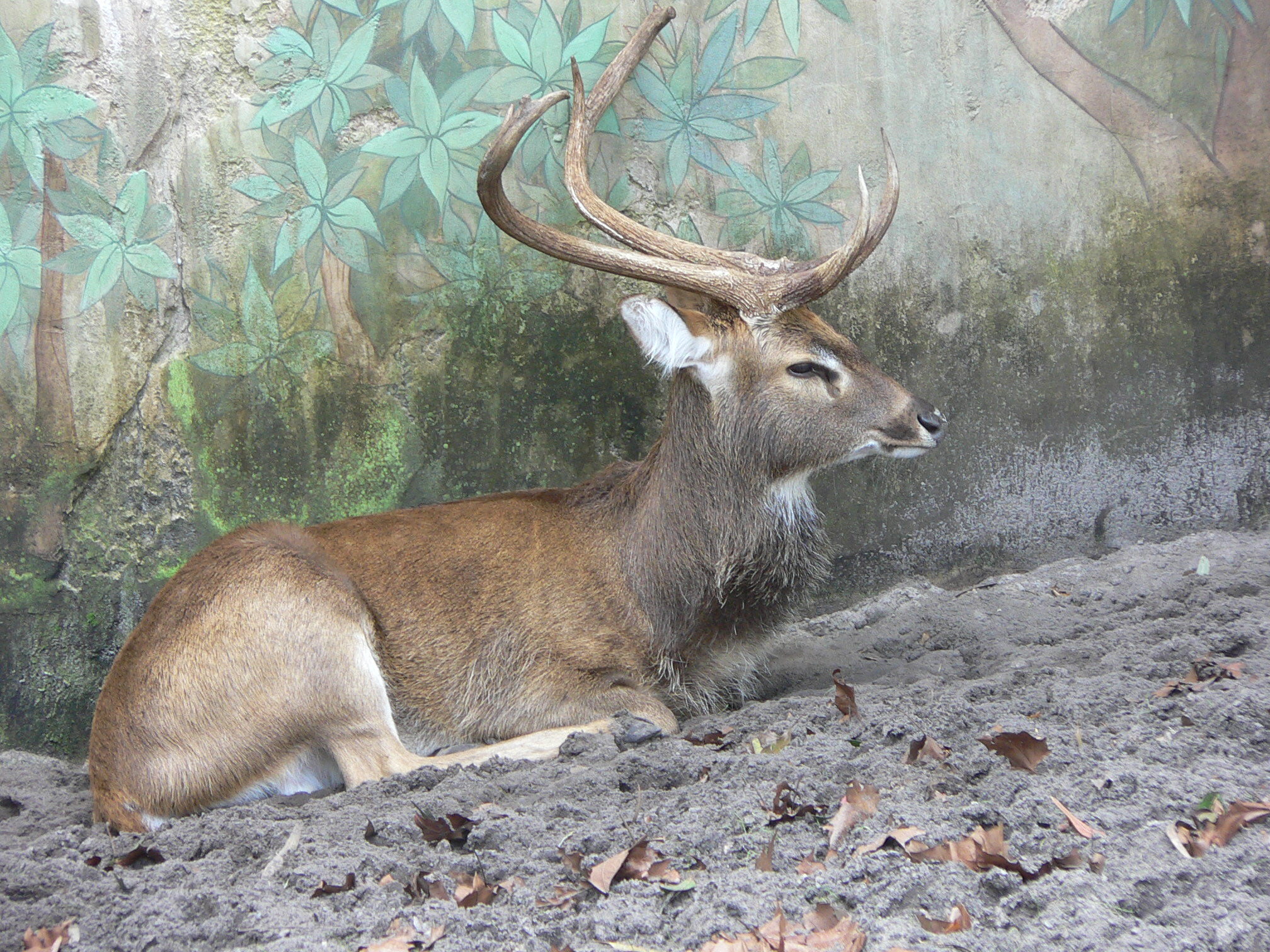
Brow-antlered deer or sangai or the dancing deer (Cervus eldi eldi)

The park, primarily composed of moist semi–evergreen forests, has a rich amalgam of aquatic, wetland and terrestrial ecosystem. The grass land structure of the park is divided into three zones.

=== Flora ===
Aquatic flora recorded in the park include Zizania latifolia (wild rice, ishing kambong), Tripidium bengalense, Eiranthus procerus (singnang), Dioscorea bulbifera (phumha), Cynodon dactylon (tinthou), Alpinia galanga (pullei), Eichhornia crassipes (kabokang), Hedychium coronarium (loklei), Nelumbo nucifera (thambal) and Phragmites karka (tou).

=== Fauna ===
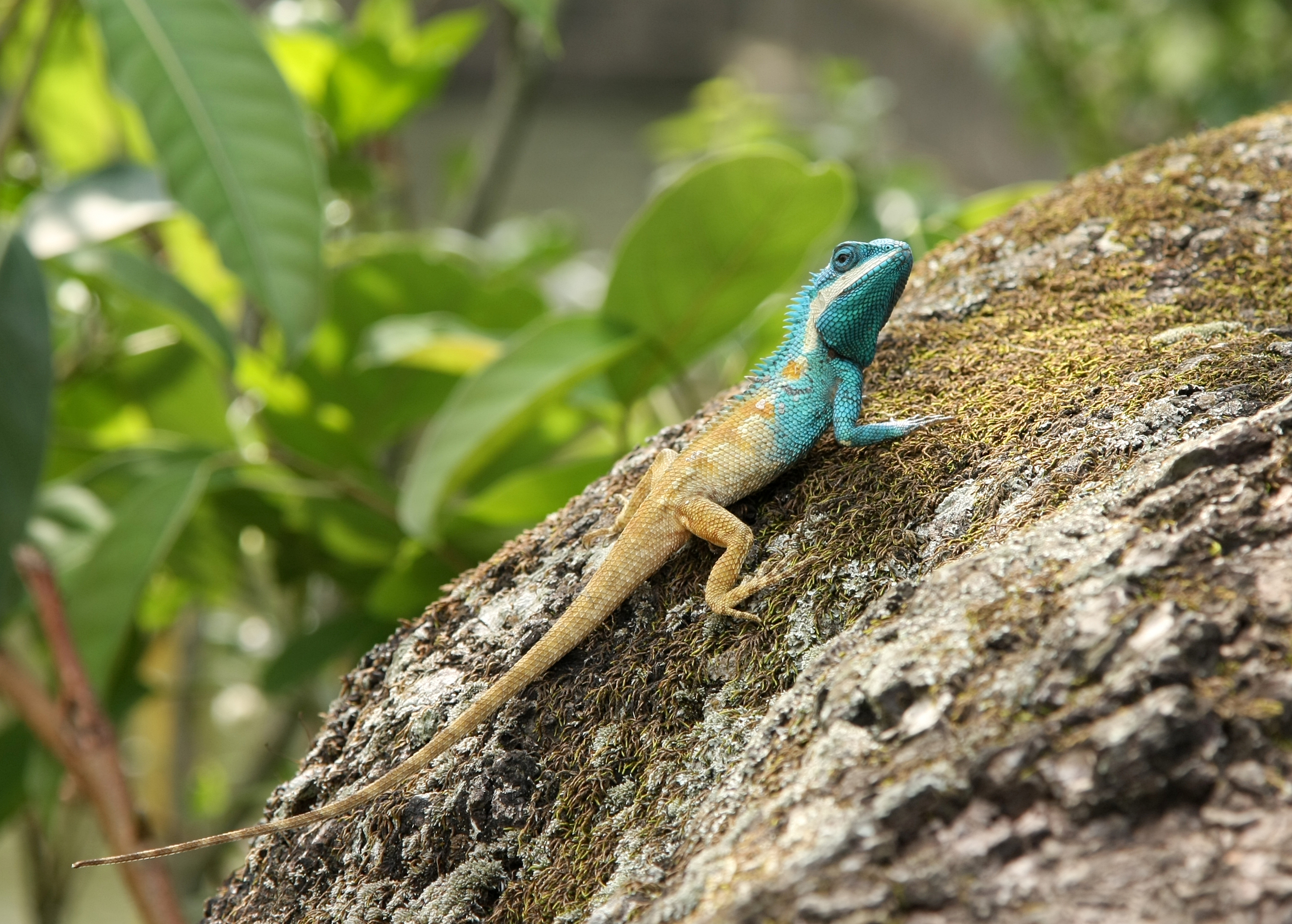
A blue-crested lizard (Calotes mystaceus)

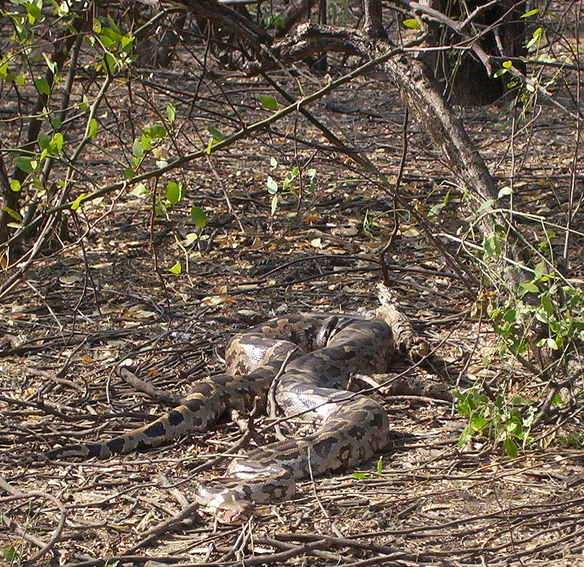
Light phase Asian rock python (Python molurus molurus) below a tree

Apart from the brow-antlered deer (Cervus eldi eldi), the flagship species of the park, other fauna found in the park were the following:

- Mammals reported are the hog deer (C. porcinus), wild boar (Sus scrofa), large Indian civet (Viverra civetta), common otter (Lutra lutra), fox, jungle cat (Felis chaus), Asian golden cat, bay bamboo rat, musk shrew, common shrew, flying fox and sambar (Cervus unicolor).
- Fishes include Channa striata, Channa punctatus, common carp, Wallago attu and pool barb.
- Amphibians and reptiles include the keel back tortoise, viper, krait, cobra, water cobra, banded krait, Asian rat snake (beauty rat snake), python, Russel's viper (Daboia), checkered garter snake and common lizard (Viviparous lizard). Python molurus is also found in the park.

=== Avifauna ===
Prominent bird species recorded in the park are both migratory and resident. Some of them are the East Himalayan pied kingfisher, black kite, lesser sky-lark, northern hill myna, Indian pied myna, North Indian black drongos, lesser eastern jungle crow, yellow headed wagtail, spotbill duck, blue-winged teal, ruddy shell duck, threatened hooded crane, Burmese sarus sarus crane, Indian white-breasted waterhen and crimson-breasted pied woodpecker.

== Threats ==
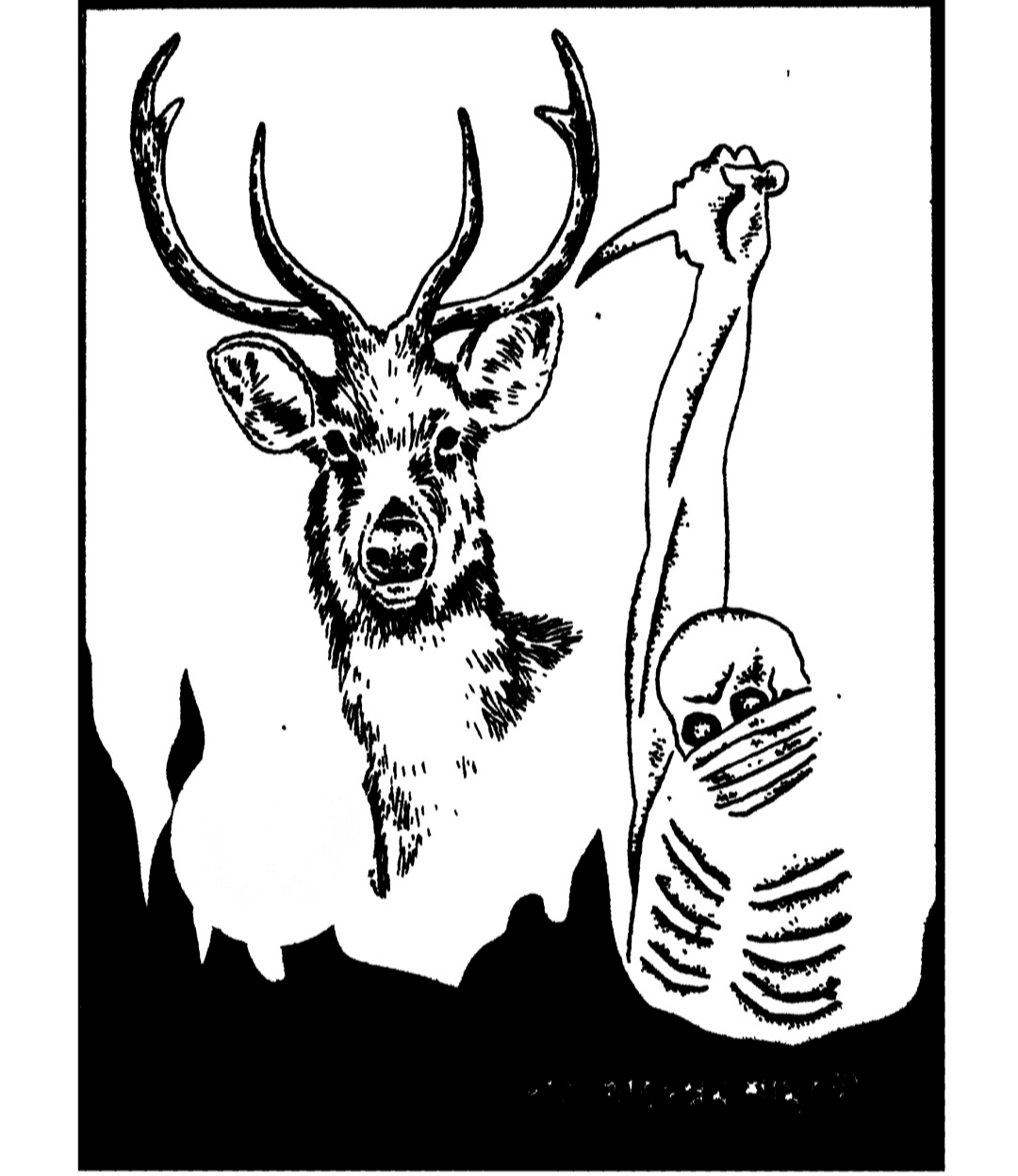
A Meitei popular cultural illustration of Sangai deer (the primary reason for the establishment of the Keibul Lamjao national park) pleading to save him from being killed by human beings

Some of the identified threats to the park are elaborated below.

1. The threats to the park are due to the permanent flooding of the park and its resultant effect on the thickness of phumdis. The reason attributed for this is due to construction of the Ithai Barrage under the Loktak Multi-Purpose Project in 1983 where high level of water is maintained (between 768 m (2,519.7 ft) and 768.5 m (2,521.3 ft) ) during October to March – the dry months of the year. This has disturbed the natural cycle of floating and sinking of phumdis which used to be maintained in the park. Maintenance of high water level in the lake throughout the year for Loktak Multipurpose Project has broken this annual cycle and phumdis remain floating throughout the year during dry season and are no more available to phumdi vegetation. Therefore, the growth of vegetation on phumdis and their thickness are believed to be gradually decreasing.
2. Before the construction of the Loktak Hydro Electric Project, the phumdis floated during flooding by backflow from the Khordak River and discharge from other streams and nalas and settled down on lake bed during dry season when water was drawn out through the same river. This resulted in enhancing of nutrients and minerals of the phumdi vegetation from the bottom of the lake during the dry period. But this cycle has been disturbed by the Loktak Hydro Electric project. One apprehension is that at some stage the phumdis may not be able to support the number of the Eld's deer or sangai deer.
3. The national park and the Loktak Lake have provided sustenance (through fishing, growing, and collection of vegetables of economic importance) to the people living in the peripheral villages and on the phumdis. The effect of maintaining permanently high water level is stated to be a serious threat to the phumdis and consequently to the people living on the lake/park's natural resources.
4. Earlier, there was only marshy land in the park area but after commissioning of the hydroelectric project two ecosystems have emerged; one with water body covering one-third area and the other the phumdis, which covers two-thirds area.
5. Deteriorating water quality is indicated by the recorded pH values of 4 to 8.5. The reasons for poor quality are attributed to flow of
  1. pollutants from the towns draining into the lake,
  2. use of agrochemicals for farming in the surrounding farmland,
  3. accumulation of water on phumdi,
  4. deforestation and subsequent soil erosion in the catchment area and
  5. rotting vegetation.

== Conservation measures ==
Conservation measures suggested relate to development and implementation of a management plan giving priority to long term conservation, monitoring the condition of habitat and to take timely corrective measures by enforcing strict protection of core areas, particularly with reference to the water level due to the Loktak Hydro Electric Power Project.

Some of the measures suggested and under implementation are elaborated as:

1. provide effective protection,
2. developing and maintaining high places with adequate protection and food material to provide protection to the animals in case of flash flood,
3. increasing area under phumdis in the park,
4. preventing theft of phumdis and flow or part of phumdis towards northern side,
5. topping completely the collection of firewood, food and fodder,
6. creating an environment in which local people volunteer as natural custodian of sangai and other animals in the park,
7. to encourage ecotourism and nature education,
8. to undertake, aid, promote and co–ordinate research works,
9. capacity building, training, awareness and extension activities,
10. launching packaging and publicity campaign and
11. propagating ethnic information, exhibition and so forth.

Conservation measures implemented The measures that have been implemented by the Forest Department of the Manipur Government are the following.

1. A perimeter fence of 2,281 m (7,483.6 ft) length in most vulnerable sections of the park to prevent people and domestic livestock from entering the reserve has been created
2. A cattle-proof trench has been dug along 870 m (2,854.3 ft) of the boundary
3. Seven canoes and four checkpoints are established at strategic places for security.
4. Army helicopter has carried out census work.
5. The park is under the supervision of full–time forest officials.
6. Capacity building has been achieved by exclusive placement of an Assistant Conservator of Forests, an assistant veterinary surgeon, a ranger of forests, field assistant, three foresters, four forest guards and eight others for the park.

== Films ==
- The Return of Sangai (Meitei: Sangai Hallakpa) is a documentary about Keibul Lamjao National Park and Sangai made by forest department Manipur. The film is available in both English and Manipuri.
