= Phumdi =

Phumdi Phum Phumthi
- Phumdis
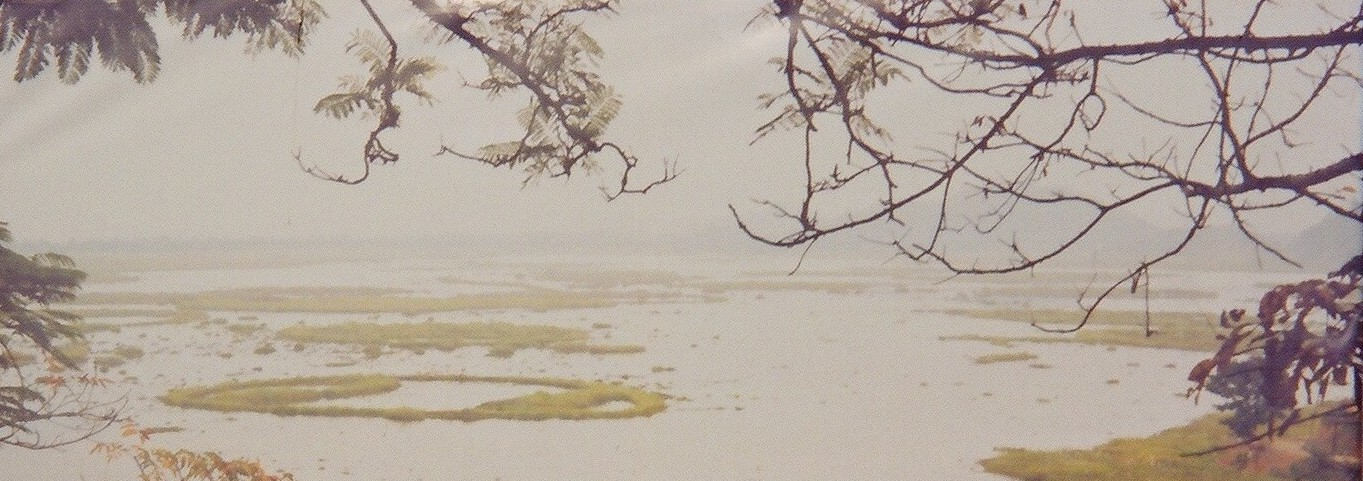
- Loktak Lake

- Location in Manipur, India Phumdi (India)
- Coordinates: 24°30′00″N 93°46′00″E
- Country: India
- State: Manipur
- District: Bishnupur District

Area
  - Total: 40 km^{2} (15 sq mi)
- Elevation: 768.5 m (2,521 ft)

Languages
  - Official: Meitei (Manipuri)
- Time zone: UTC+5:30 (IST)
- Vehicle registration: MN
- Nearest city: Moirang, Imphal
- Precipitation: 1,220 millimetres (48 in)
- Avg. summer temperature: 32 °C (90 °F)
- Avg. winter temperature: 4 °C (39 °F)

Phumdi (Meitei pronunciation: /pʰúm.dí/), also known as Phumthi (Meitei pronunciation: /pʰúm.tʰí/) or simply Phum (Meitei pronunciation: /pʰúm/), are a series of floating islands in the Loktak Lake, located in Manipur state, in northeastern India. They cover a substantial part of the lake area and are heterogeneous masses of vegetation, soil and organic matter, in different stages of decay. The largest single mass of phumdi is in the southeastern part of the lake, covering an area of 40 km^{2} (15.4 mi^{2}). This mass constitutes the world’s largest floating park, named Keibul Lamjao National Park. The park was formed to preserve the endangered Eld's deer subspecies, scientific name is Rucervus eldii called sangai in the Meitei language, indigenous to this area.

Phumdis are used by the local people for constructing their huts for fishing and other livelihood uses, and are inhabited by about 4000 people. Athapums are artificial circular phumdis, built by the villagers as enclosures for fish farming; aquaculture has caused proliferation of the phumdis in the lake.

== Traditional practice ==
Although phumdi vegetation has existed for centuries, it was not until 1886 that the Manipur Gazetteer recorded that wetlands with floating islands were used by inhabitants for fishing. Before the Ithai barrage was constructed in 1986, 207 khangpoks (huts or sheds) were reported on the phumdis, but after the dam was completed in 1999, the Loktak Development Authority (LDA) reported 800 such structures. Many of the huts are reported to have been converted into permanent dwellings and about 4,000 people live in these floating huts, earning their living as fishermen. The huts are constructed using plastic ropes, heavy rocks, wood, bamboo, zinc plates and iron rods. Athapums, artificial circular phumdis, which were built by the villagers as enclosures for fish farming, are present on the lake, and this aquaculture has caused further proliferation of the phumdis. A tourist lodge has been built on one of the phumdis in Sandra Island.

== Ecological composition ==
The floating mass of matted vegetation, organic debris, and soil that constitutes a phumdi has a thickness that varies from a few centimetres to two metres. Its humus is black in colour and porous, with a spongy texture. Only 20% of a phumdi's thickness floats above the water surface; the other 80% remains submerged. Before the construction of the Loktak Hydroelectric Project, the park area containing phumdis was merely marshy land, but since the commissioning of the project, two ecosystems have emerged. One, the body of open water, covers one-third of the area and the other, the phumdi, covers the remaining two-thirds.

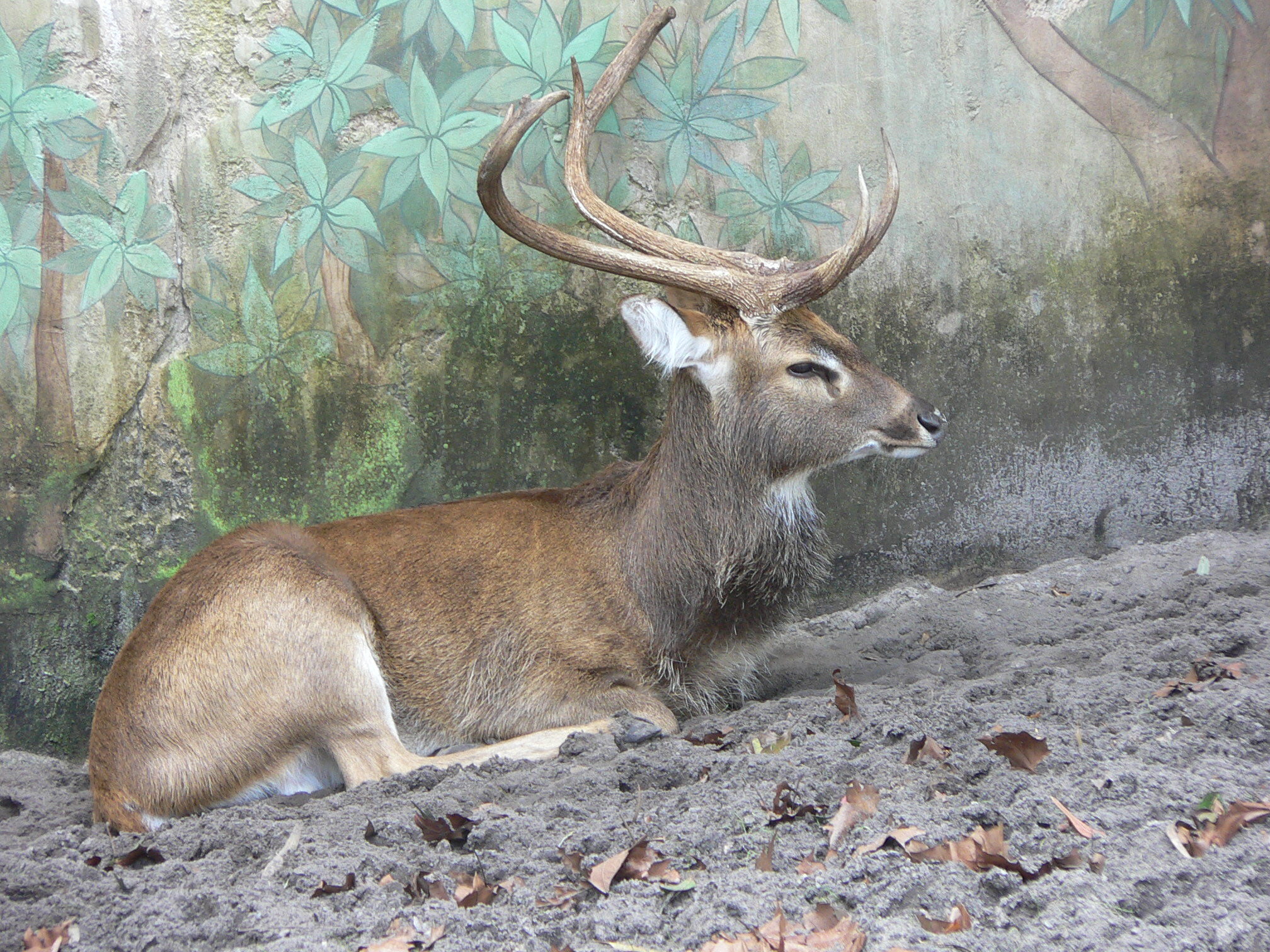
A sangai Manipuri deer which thrives on phumdis

The life-cycle of the phumdis has generally been subject to seasonal variation. During the monsoon season when the water level is high, the phumdis float, but during the dry season, as the water level falls, the phumdis touch the lake bed and absorb nutrients from it. When the wet season returns, they again float, and the biomass, which has enough nutrients stored in the plants' roots, survives. However, the contemporary situation, with high water levels in the lake throughout the year, has meant that the process of 'feeding' on lake–bottom nutrients has been seriously disturbed, resulting in a loss of biomass and a thinning of the islands each year. In January 1999, it was reported that a large section of phumdi in the north of the park had shattered into pieces and drifted away from the park area, threatening the habitat of the sangai.

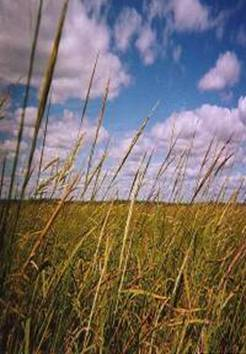
Zizania latifolia or wild rice, the highest productivity species

Changes in the water regime due to the construction of the Ithai barrage across the Manipur River have caused changes in the vegetation composition of the phumdis. A study was instituted, from October 2005 to July 2006, to record the vegetation composition and productivity of phumdis in areas of ranging thickness, water depth and soil pH, accumulating data in both summer and winter. The study recorded 83 plant species of 21 families (Poaceae and Cyperaceae formed the dominant families); 81 species were recorded in summer and 48 in winter. The Diversity indices of the plant species were recorded; they were a richness of 48, diversity of 0.29 and evenness of 0.47 in summer. In winter, the respective figures were 81, 0.17 and 0.52. Species richness was found to be different in 48 samples of thin phumdis, 53 samples of thick phumdis and 14 samples on hard ground. The eight plant communities identified during winter and summer were Capillipedium, Leersia hexandra, Oenanthe javanica, Phragmites karka, Kyllinga triceps, Pteridium aquilinum, Zizania latifolia and Persicaria perfoliata. Zizania latifolia recorded the highest productivity with (13.90 ± 5.01) g/m^{2} for winter and (102.96 ± 26.03) g/m^{2} for summer. Greater productivity was recorded in summer (65.96 g/m^{2}) than winter (15.76 g/m^{2}). Variation of productivity of annuals and perennials were noted according to seasons and type of phumdis.

=== Wildlife ===
The largest of all the phumdis in the lake is situated in the southeastern region of the Loktak Lake, which forms the Keibul Lamjao National Park. This park is the last natural refuge of the endangered Manipur brow-antlered deer (Cervus eldi eldi), locally known as the sangai, one of the three sub species of the Eld's deer listed as an endangered species by the International Union for Conservation of Nature.

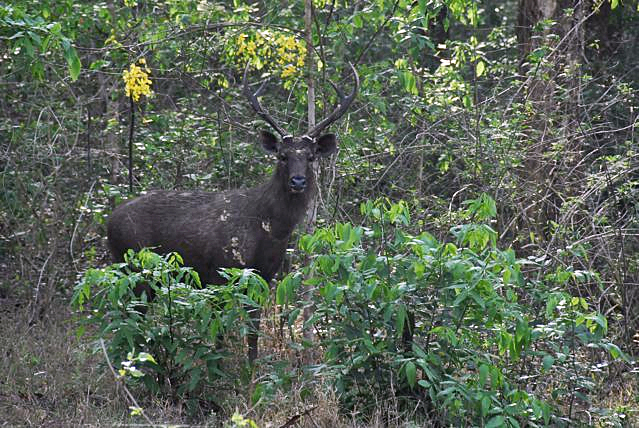
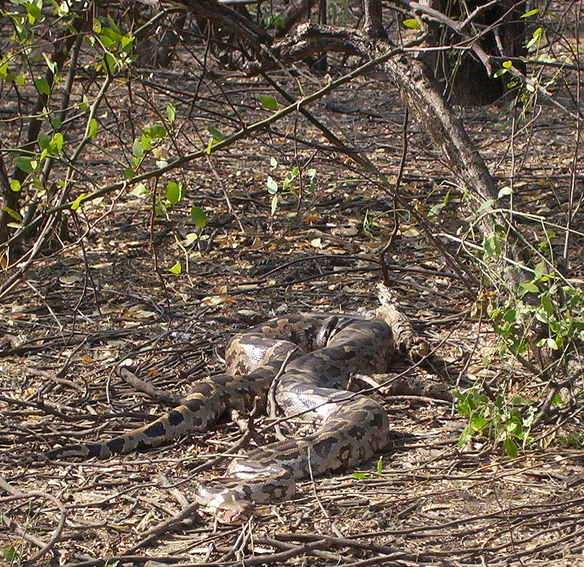
Left: sambar (Cervus unicolor) in the park. Right: light phase Asian rock python (Python molurus molurus) below a tree

Apart from the brow-antlered deer, which is the flagship species of the park, other fauna found in the park are mammals, reptiles, and migratory and resident avifauna species.

Mammal species consist of hog deer (C. porcinus), wild boar (Sus scrota), large Indian civets (Viverra civetta, Viverricula indica), common otter (Lutra lutra), fox, jungle cat, Asian golden cat, bay bamboo rat, musk shrew, common shrew, flying fox, and sambar (Cervus unicolor).

Reptile species found in the park are the keel back tortoise, viper, krait, cobra, water cobra, banded krait (Bungarus fasciatus), Asian rat snake (beauty rat snake), Russels’ viper (Daboia), checkered garter snake, python and common lizard (viviparous lizard). Python molurus is an endangered species found in the park.

Prominent bird species seen in the park are both migratory and resident avifauna species. Some of the avifauna are the East Himalayan pied kingfisher, black kite, lesser sky-lark, northern hill myna, Indian pied myna, North Indian black drongos, lesser eastern jungle crow, yellow headed wagtail, spotbill duck, blue-winged teal, ruddy shell duck, hooded crane, Burmese sarus crane, Indian white-breasted waterhen and crimson-breasted pied woodpecker.

== Environmental issues ==
The proliferation of phumdis, coupled with severe infestation of the lake by water hyacinth, has substantially impeded water circulation and caused an increase in siltation and deposit of pollutants in the lake ecosystem. The building materials used to build huts on the phumdi blocks sunlight from reaching the lower depths of the lake water, which has resulted in formation of vertical profiles of the lake water body and decomposition. Further, pesticides and insecticides are used for catching fish or as insect repellent. Processes of decay release toxic gases such as methane and hydrogen sulfide, and reduce dissolved oxygen. This causes the lake water to degenerate into a eutrophic condition, creating a dead water zone called the hypolimnion. Above the hypolimnion is a thin layer, known as epilimnion, where fish survive to some degree. The benthal is becoming increasingly thick, causing not only pollution of the lake water, but an increase in the shallow part of the lake.

It has been reported that the construction of Ithai Barrage has altered the Loktak Lake and its ecosystem. Siltation has reduced the water holding capacity and has consequently had a negative impact on the power generation capacity at the Loktak Hydro Electric Power Project. Thinning of the phumdi in the Keibul Lamjao area has affected the habitat of the sangai, and other aquafauna, avifauna and flora are on the decline; the 35 species (5 mammals, 3 birds, 9 reptiles, 3 amphibians, 12 fishes, 2 molluscs and 1 annelid) are reported to be disappearing gradually.

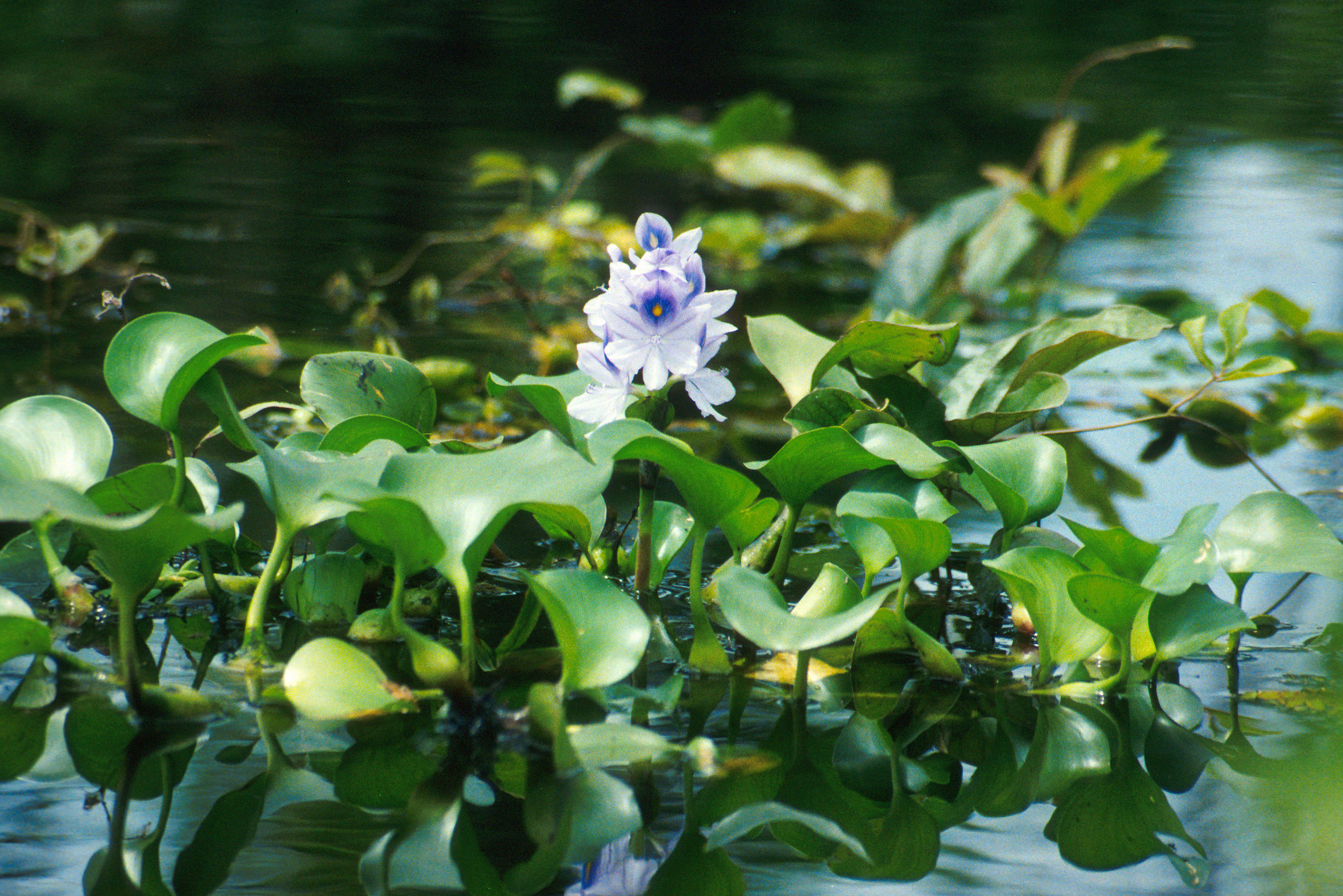
Infestation of Loktak Lake by water hyacinth

It is also reported that the soil of the park formed by the phumdis is highly acidic, with unsuitable pH conditions for many species of plants to grow and flourish. Further, the acidity of the soil has also adversely affected the fish breeding farms. Recent reports indicate that locals are slicing the phumdis into sizeable pieces and towing them with canoes to sell to fish culture owners.

A scientific study of the water quality parameters of physico-chemical and microbiological characteristics and role of phumdis in the Loktak Lake has been conducted by collecting surface water samples on monthly basis from 15 stations, representing 5 zones; northern, western, eastern, middle and southern. The test results indicated that water quality in the phumdi area was poor in the northern and southern zones of the lake; test results indicated low dissolved oxygen, low pH (normal range for Loktak Lake is 6.3 to 8.2) high CO_{2} and high Biochemical Oxygen Demand (BOD) but the water quality was good in the open water area. Assessment of the total nitrogen content of the macrophyte species of phumdis indicated that the following were present in descending order: Salvinia natans (1.8%), Zizania latifolia (1.6%), Capillipedium sp. (1.3%), Brachiaria mutica (1.2%), Cyperus brevifolius (1.2%), Echinochloa stagnina (1.0%), Phragmites karka (1.0%) and Hedychium coranarium (0.94%). The test results confirmed the fact that the phumdis were efficient in absorbing nutrients from the lake water. However, they deteriorated water quality due to reduced light penetration and accumulation of organic matter in the lake ecosystem.

== Management strategies ==
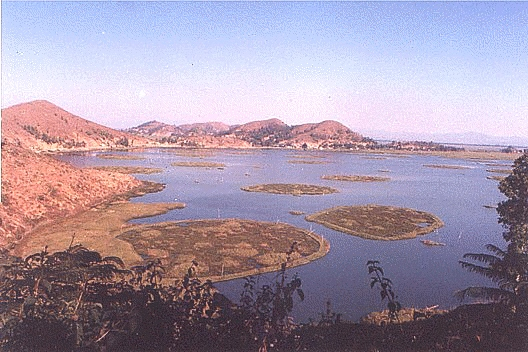
Circular phumdis, called athampum, were artificially built for fishing in Loktak Lake; their removal is now proposed.

A detailed study has been conducted by the Loktak Development Authority (LDA) in collaboration with Wetlands International–South Asia, supported by the India–Canada Environment Facility, implementing a project on Sustainable Development and Water Resources Management of the Loktak Lake. The project addresses the issues relating to water management, sustainable fisheries development, community participation and development, catchment area treatment and conservation of wildlife. The Planning Commission of the Government of India, decided in September 2008 that these policies would be implemented over a period of 5–6 years at an estimated cost of over Rs500 crores (US$100 million), and extended the area under management to also incorporate the water of Nambul and other rivers and their tributaries, which are primarily responsible for polluting the Loktak Lake.

In order to resolve the problem of the excessive growth of phumdis that affects the lake ecosystem and local community, a study sponsored by the India–Canada Environment Facility was undertaken by the Tata Energy Research Institute (TERI) to examine efficient ways of converting phumdis into briquettes as fodder and fuel pellets, which could be used to meet both energy demands within the region. Two options for the biomass conversion were studied. The first involved making briquettes of vegetative part of phumdis for use as fodder while the second proposed to pelletise the lower part of phumdis for use as fuel. The study observed that phumdis have nutritional potential as feed material due to its higher crude fibre and crude protein content, but the inorganic content in the root and mat zone was found to be unsuitable for the purpose. The second option of making briquettes from the upper vegetative portion of the phumdis by mixing 12% de-oiled rice bran was found to be feasible for using them as fodder. The lower portion, which was densified to make fuel pellets, was found to be suitable for use as fuel. Such pellets were found to have an average calorific value of 3,400 calories per kilogram (14,200 kJ/kg) with ash content of 27%. Cost economics were worked out and the study had found it to be "an economically viable and an attractive proposition for the benefit of local population." The study concluded that extraction of phumdi from the lake could also generate income for the local people who are dependent on the lake for their livelihood. Such a step would protect the lake from the adverse effects of proliferation of phumdis and maintain the ecological balance of the lake, thus converting the waste into wealth. The Planning Commission has also concurred with project proposals to engage interested individuals and private enterprises to begin the commercial venture of manufacturing compost from the phumdis and thus improve the environment of the Keibul Lamjao National Park. The project also envisages removal of 3630 artificial phumdis and compensation to their owners; this is reported to have been implemented.

Another method adopted in the past to tackle the phumdis was by way of diverting them towards the Khordak River. However, as this approach had not been very successful, the State Government planned to construct a canal at Tera Khunou Khong Ahanbi to divert the phumdis to Manipur River. Other methods adopted by the Loktak Development Authority (LDA) to control phumdis and water hyacinth include introducing weevils for the biological control of water hyacinth, which was carried out in collaboration with the Horticulture Institute of Bangalore. Reports have shown this to be an effective method in controlling water hyacinth.

A lake restoration plan based on a decentralised bioreactor system to eliminate the organic load that enters the lake in the form of non-point and point source pollutants has also been mooted. Phumdis could be harvested in a sustainable manner by conversion into fuel and compost by installing ‘Plug Flow Bioreactors’ in a modular manner around the lake perimeter. Laboratory tests of key species of phumdis have proved its potential to produce biogas. The bioreactors could also be used to treat sewage and thus arrest flow of organic matter into the lake.

In a recent workshop organized by the LDA on "Management of Phumdis" in the Loktak Lake, which involved presentations by locals, the emphasis was on the need to open the barrage for eight months per year (January, April and June–September) to clear the phumdis, control floods and wash away the silt and waste that had accumulated over time. The LDA is also implementing action plans that are economically viable and technically feasible which would result in livelihood enhancement such as evolving an attractive resettlement plan for the phumdi dwellers backed by remunerative livelihood programs and examine the introduction of fishing nets instead of Athapum, the circular shaped Phumdis floating in the lake, planted or cultured artificially for catching fish.
