= Kakching =

Town in Imphal valley, Manipur, India

Kakching (Meitei: /kək.ciŋ/)
- town
- Location in Manipur, India Kakching (India)
- Coordinates: 24°29′54.595″N 93°58′55.724″E
- Country: India
- State: Manipur
- District: Kakching district
- Elevation: 776 m (2,546 ft)

Population (2011)
  - Total: 32,138

Language(s)
  - Official: Meitei (officially called Manipuri)
  - Regional: Kakching dialect
- Time zone: UTC+5:30 (IST)
- PIN: 795103
- Vehicle registration: MN
- Website: kakching.nic.in

Kakching (Meitei pronunciation:/kək.ciŋ/) is a town in the southeastern part of the Indian state of Manipur. It serves as the headquarters of Kakching district and is a major commercial hub in the state. In 2018, Kakching was declared as the cleanest city in North East India by the Swachh Bharat Mission of the Indian government. Kakching dialect of Meitei language is spoken in this region, and it shares many grammatical features with Standard Manipuri. (Note: also known as Standard Meitei or Standard Meiteilon, in different sources; it is based on the dialect spoken in Imphal.)

== Geography ==
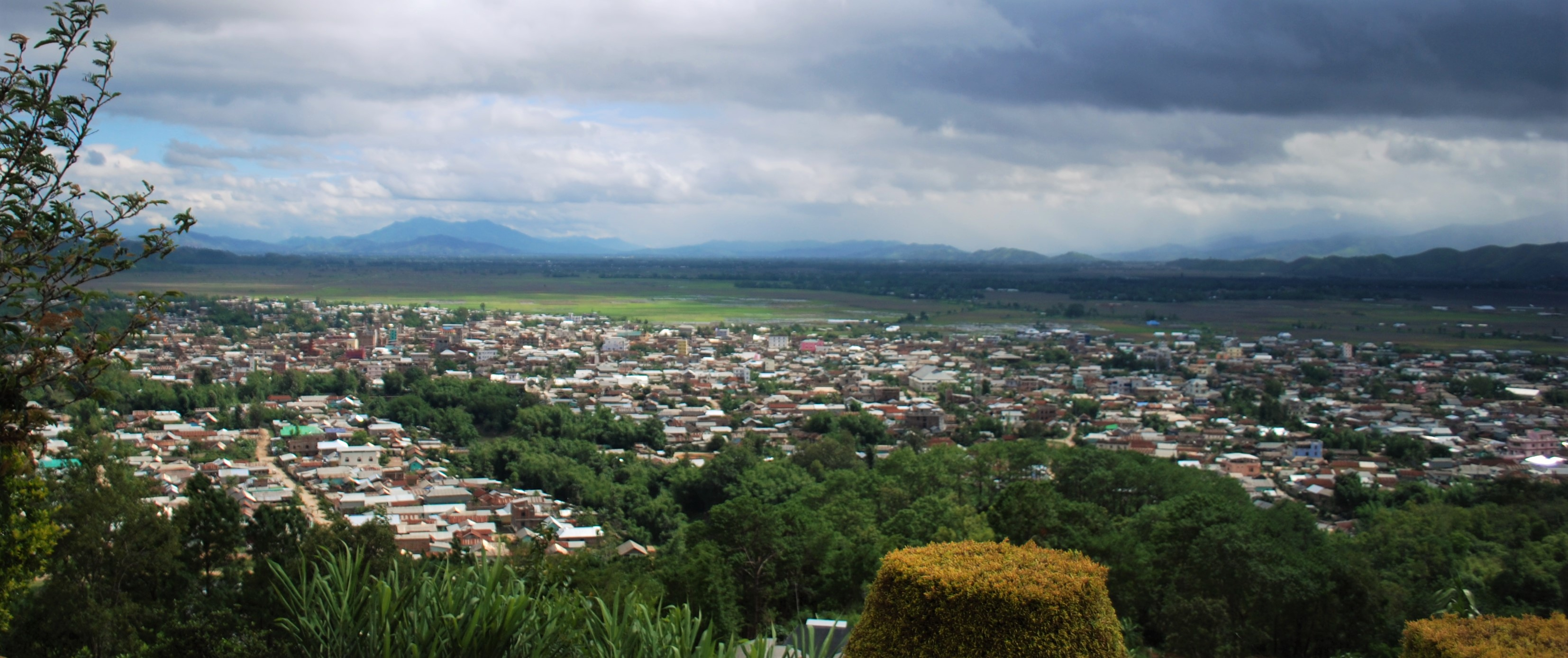
View of Kakching

Kakching ( 24.48°N 93.98°E. ) is located in the southern part of Manipur state. It has an average elevation of 776 metres (2545 feet).

The town is about 44 km from the state capital Imphal, and about 70 km from the international border with Burma.

== Demographics ==
According to the 2011 census, the population of Kakching was 32,138, of which 15,710 were males and 16,428 were females. The population of children aged from zero to six years was 4,181, which was 13.01% of the total population. The female sex ratio was 1,046 against the state average of 985. The literacy rate was 83.08%, against the state average of 76.94%. Male literacy was 90.21% while the female literacy rate was 76.40%.

== Kakching Garden ==
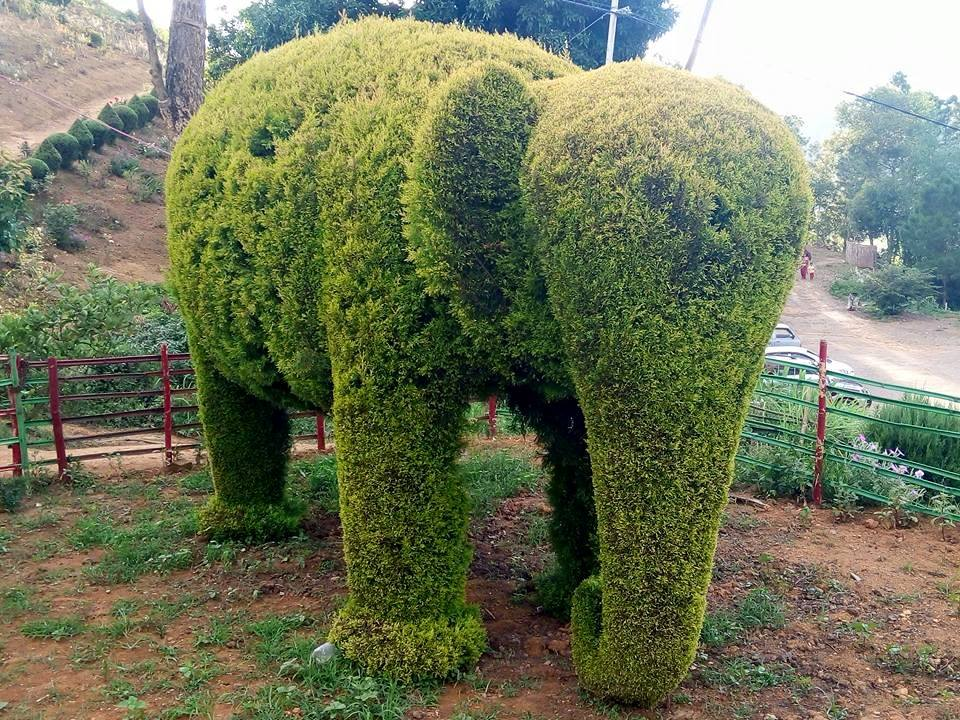
A topiary plant resembling a Green Elephant inside the Kakching Garden

The Kakching Garden is situated at Uyok Ching, to the south of Kakching Market, and has been developed as a tourist centre. The site includes different religious destinations including the "Ibudhou Pakhangba Laishang" (also termed as "Ibudhou Pakhangba Laisang"), the shrine of Haoreima Sampubi, a shrine of Shiva, a rose garden, parks and restaurants. A road up to the hill was constructed for vehicles to reach the garden. The site is popular with people from Manipur and the surrounding area. Important programmes relating to social and culture are also organised here.

=== Pakhangba Temple ===
The Pakhangba Temple (Meitei: Iputhou Pakhangba Laishang/Ibudhou Pakhangba Laishang) of the Kakching Garden is built in traditional Meitei architecture. It has a serpentine dragon statue of Pakhangba being installed inside the temple hall. Visitors offer fruits and flowers to deity to seek his blessings. The shrine is located inside but just next to the entrance gate of the Kakching Garden.

== Politics ==
Kakching is part of Outer Manipur (Lok Sabha constituency). It sends one MLA in the state assembly. Shri Mayanglambam Rameshwor Singh represents Kakching following the 11th assembly election.
