= Schistura kangjupkhulensis =

Conservation status
- Endangered (IUCN 3.1)

Scientific classification
- Kingdom: Animalia
- Phylum: Chordata
- Class: Actinopterygii
- Order: Cypriniformes
- Family: Nemacheilidae
- Genus: Schistura
- Species: S. kangjupkhulensis

Binomial name
- Schistura kangjupkhulensis (Hora, 1921)

Synonyms
- Nemacheilus kangjupkhulensis Hora, 1921; Noemacheilus kangjupkhulensis (Hora, 1921)

Species of fish

Schistura kangjupkhulensis is a species of ray-finned fish in the most speciose genus of stone loaches, Schistura. It can be found in shallow, fast flowing streams with gravel substrates in the Tizu, Imphal and Nambul Rivers on the Chindwin Basin in Manipur, India. This species is very rare and appears to be decreasing and its populations are threatened by destructive fishing emtods as well as human alteration of its habitat by damming and water abstraction.
