= Sangai (disambiguation) =

Sangai refers to:

- Sangai, a deer species found only in Keibul Lamjao National Park, the world's only floating national park in the Loktak lake of Manipur
- Sangai Festival, an annual cultural fair organised in honour of Sangai deer
- Sangai International University, an educational institution named after the eponymous deer
- The Sangai Express, a Meitei language newspaper daily, named after the eponymous deer
