= Ithai Barrage =

Dam on the Manipur River in India

Ithai Dam
- Location within Manipur Location within India
- Interactive map of Ithai Dam
- Official name: Ithai Barrage
- Coordinates: 24.4250575°N 93.8364636°E
- Construction began: 1971
- Opening date: 1983
- Construction cost: Rs 1,150,000,000

Power Station
- Pumps: 3
- Installed capacity: 105 MW

The Ithai Barrage impounds the Manipur River just below the confluence of the Imphal River and the Khuga River. It is part of the Loktak Hydroelectric project.

Its primary objective is to regulate water levels in the Loktak Lake, effectively converting it into a reservoir. Initiated by the Ministry of Irrigation and Power in 1971, the project was overseen by the National Hydro-Electric Power Corporation and completed in 1983, with an estimated expenditure of ₹115 crore (US$12 million).
