= Sangai Festival =

Annual Cultural Festival of Manipur, India

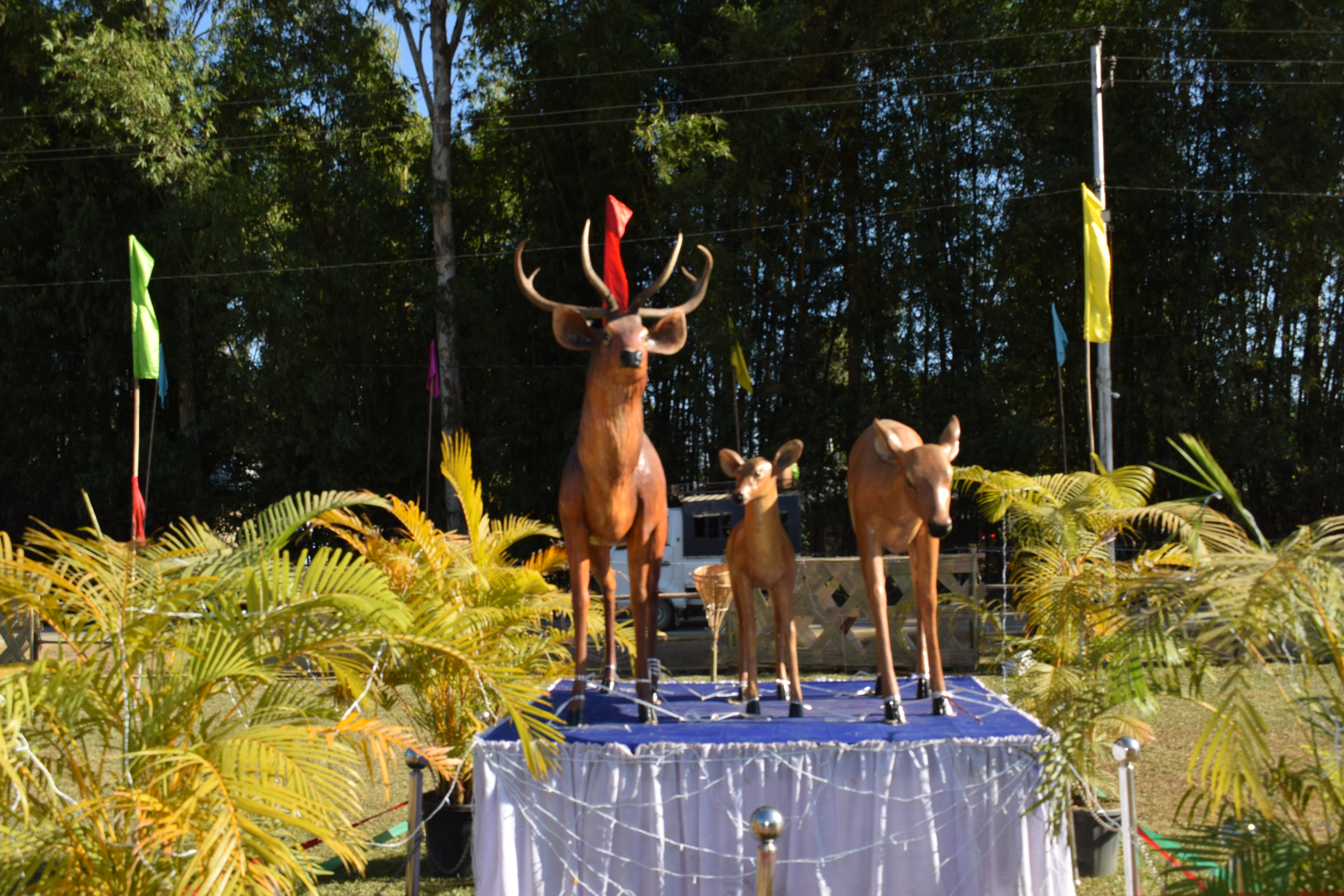
Sangai Deer Replica at Sangai Festival Manipur

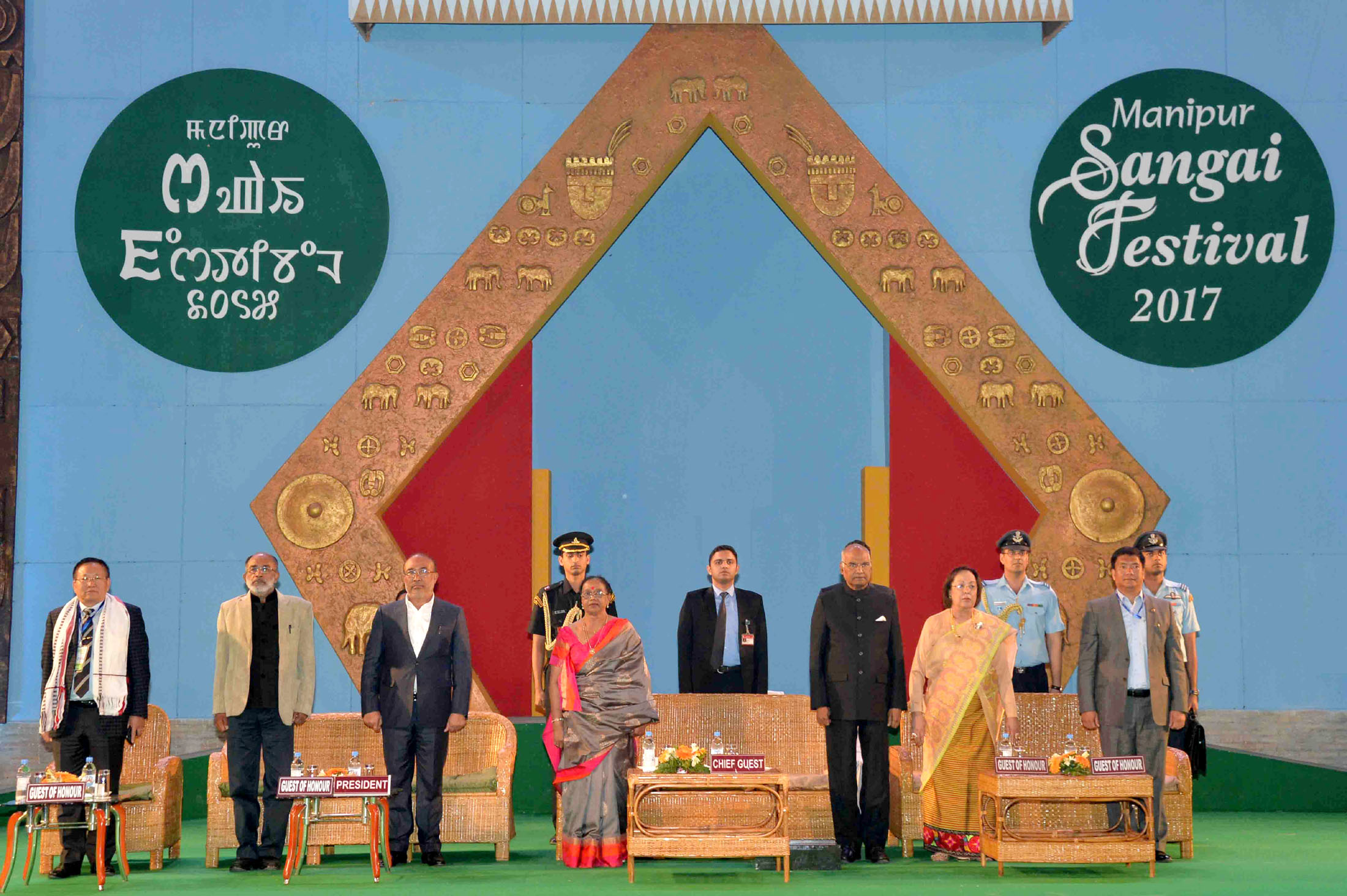
Ram Nath Kovind at the inaugural event of ‘Manipur Sangai Festival 2017’

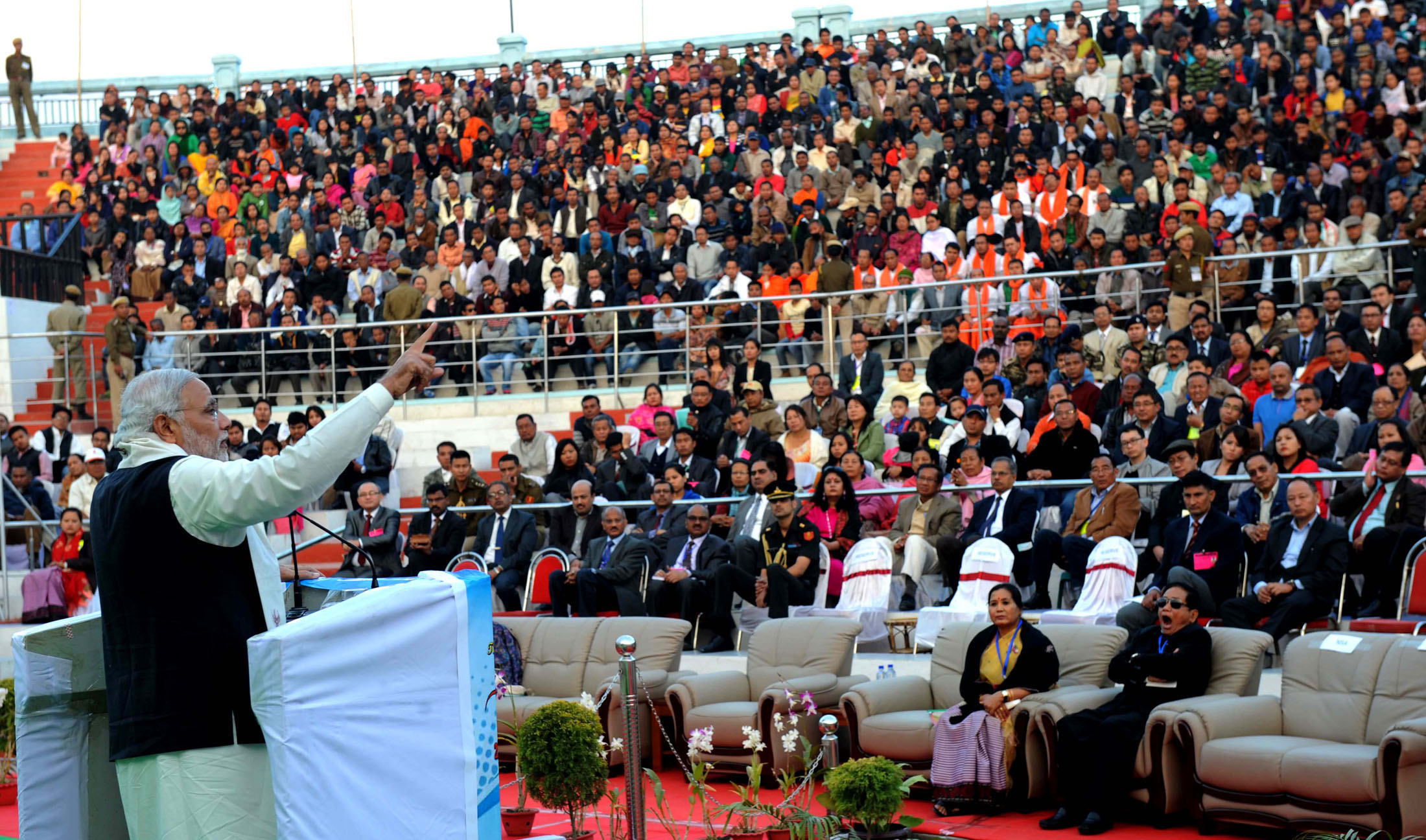
Narendra Modi giving an address at the closing function of the Sangai Festival, 2014

Sangai Festival (Meitei: Sangai Kumhei) is an annual cultural festival organised by Manipur Tourism Department every year from 21 to 30 November. Even though many editions of this Festival has been celebrated over the past few years with the name of Tourism Festival, since 2010 this has been renamed as the Sangai Festival to stage the uniqueness of the shy and gentle brow-antlered deer popularly known as the Sangai, a regional name given to this rare species of deer. It is the state animal of Manipur. As this festival is being celebrated to promote Manipur as a world class tourism destination, it showcases the states contributions to art and culture, handloom, handicrafts, fine arts, indigenous sports, cuisine, music and adventure sports, as well as the natural environment. it is celebrated in different parts mainly in the valley areas of imphal.Now expanded to hills district of Manipur, Senapati and Tamelong district.Many tourists come from all over the world and represent their craft making. Many people have also started to talk about the way Sangai festival is celebrated. They say that it should be celebrated only in one place with a proper arrangement and with big budget so that this festival grows more bigger and unique and spread all over the world.

== Festival locations ==
With the exception of a break due to the COVID 19 pandemic, the festival has been held annually at Hapta Kangjeibung and Bhagyachandra Open Air Theatre (BOAT) since 2010 and at a number of a different locations including:

- Mao
- Ukhrul
- Lamboikhongnangkhong, Uripok
- Keibul Lamjao
- Khuman Lampak
- Hapta Kangjeibung.

=== Loktak Lake ===
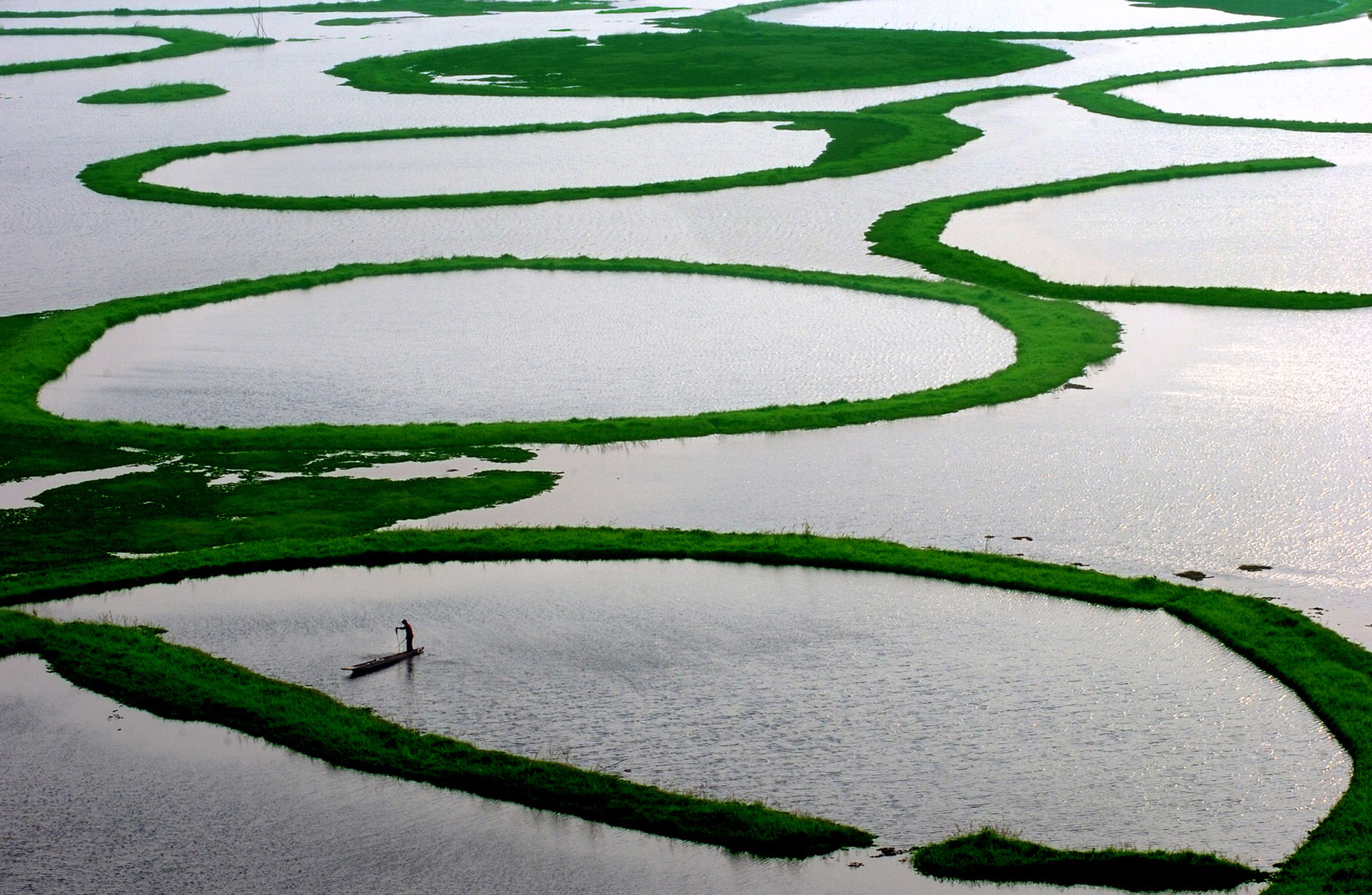
Loktak lake

The principal attraction of the state is the Loktak Lake in Bishnupur District which is 48 km from Imphal City and it is the largest fresh water lake in the North–East India. It is a stretch of water resembling a miniature inland sea. Visitors can catch a bird's eye view of the lake from Sendra. Fishermen living in floating islands called Phumdis in floating huts known as Phumsangs are sights of this lake. The Sendra Tourist Home with an attached cafeteria is a tourist spot. Boating and other water sports are organised here at Takmu Water Sports Complex.

=== Keibul Lamjao National Park ===
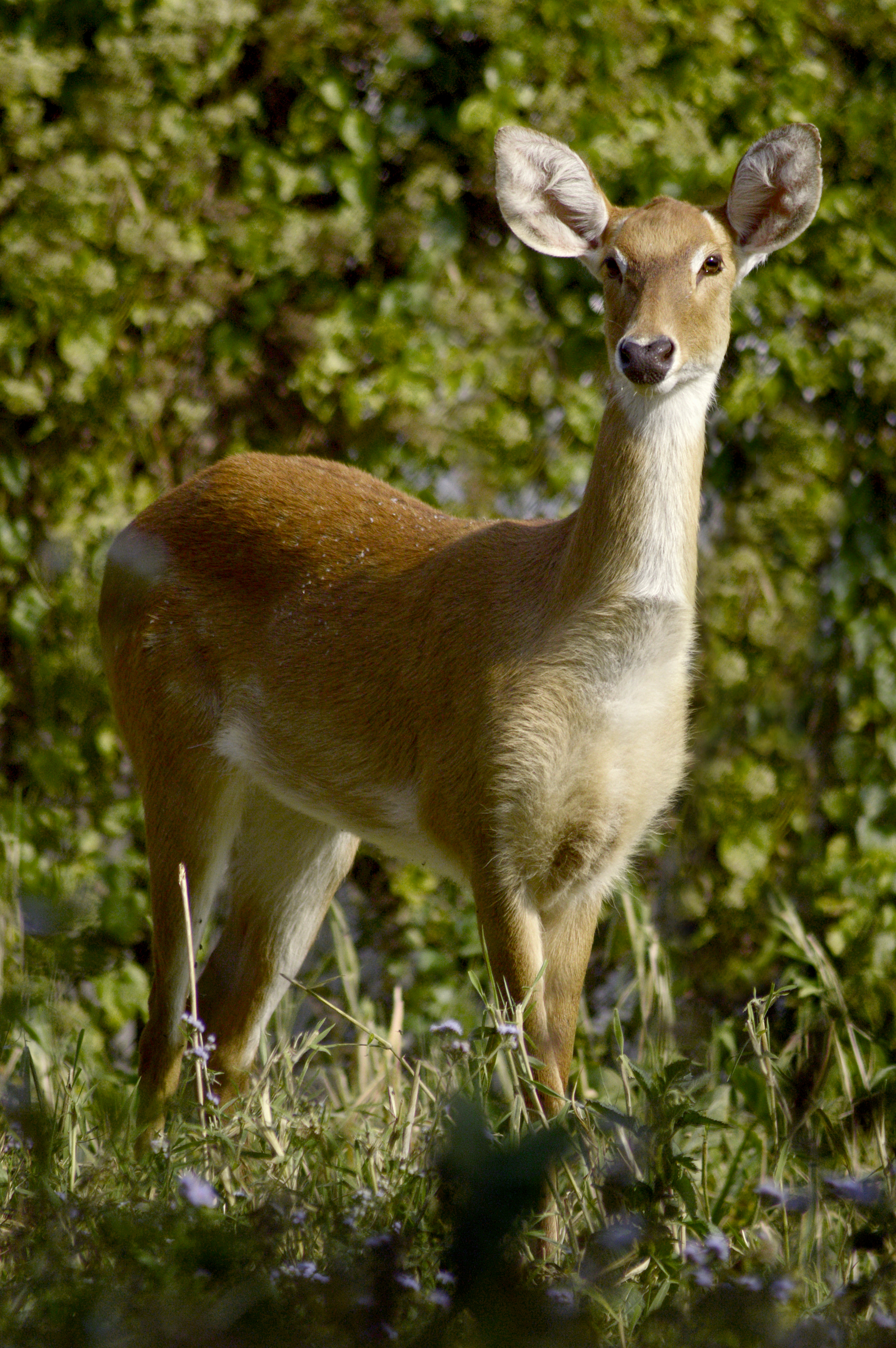
Sangai at the park

The only floating National Park in the world, the Keibul Lamjao National Park located on the Loktak Lake is the last natural habitat of the "Sangai" (Rucervus eldii eldii), the dancing deer of Manipur. Other wildlife to be seen include: hog deer, otter, water fowl and migratory birds, the latter usually sighted during November to March. The Forest Department of Manipur maintains watch towers and two rest houses within the park.

The Return of Sangai, the documentary on Sangai, endemic to Keibul Lamjao National Park was released by the forest department of Manipur during the Sangai Festival 2017.

== INA Martyrs' Memorial ==
This town in Bishnupur District of Moirang has a place in the history of India's Freedom Struggle. It was at Moirang that the flag of the Indian National Army was first unfurled on 14 April 1944. The INA Museum which has a collection of letters, photographs, badges of ranks and other war memorabilia reminds the visitors of the sacrifices made by the INA soldiers under the leadership of Netaji Subhas Chandra Bose.
