= Loktak Lake =

Lake in North East India

- Loktak Pat (Meitei)
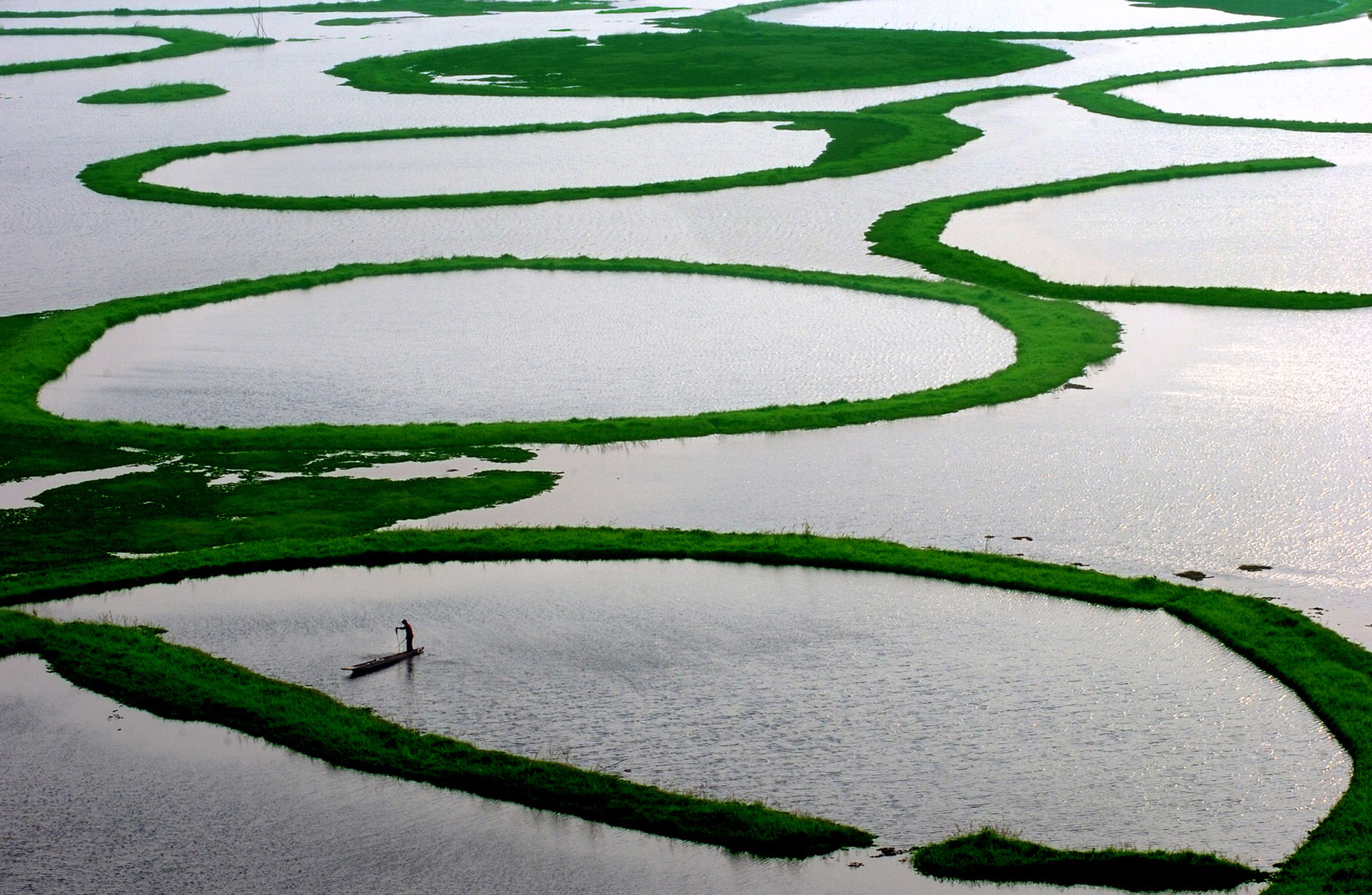
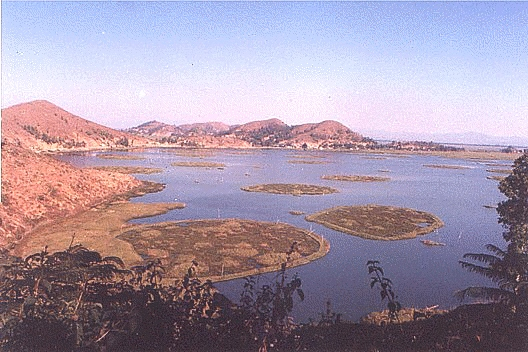
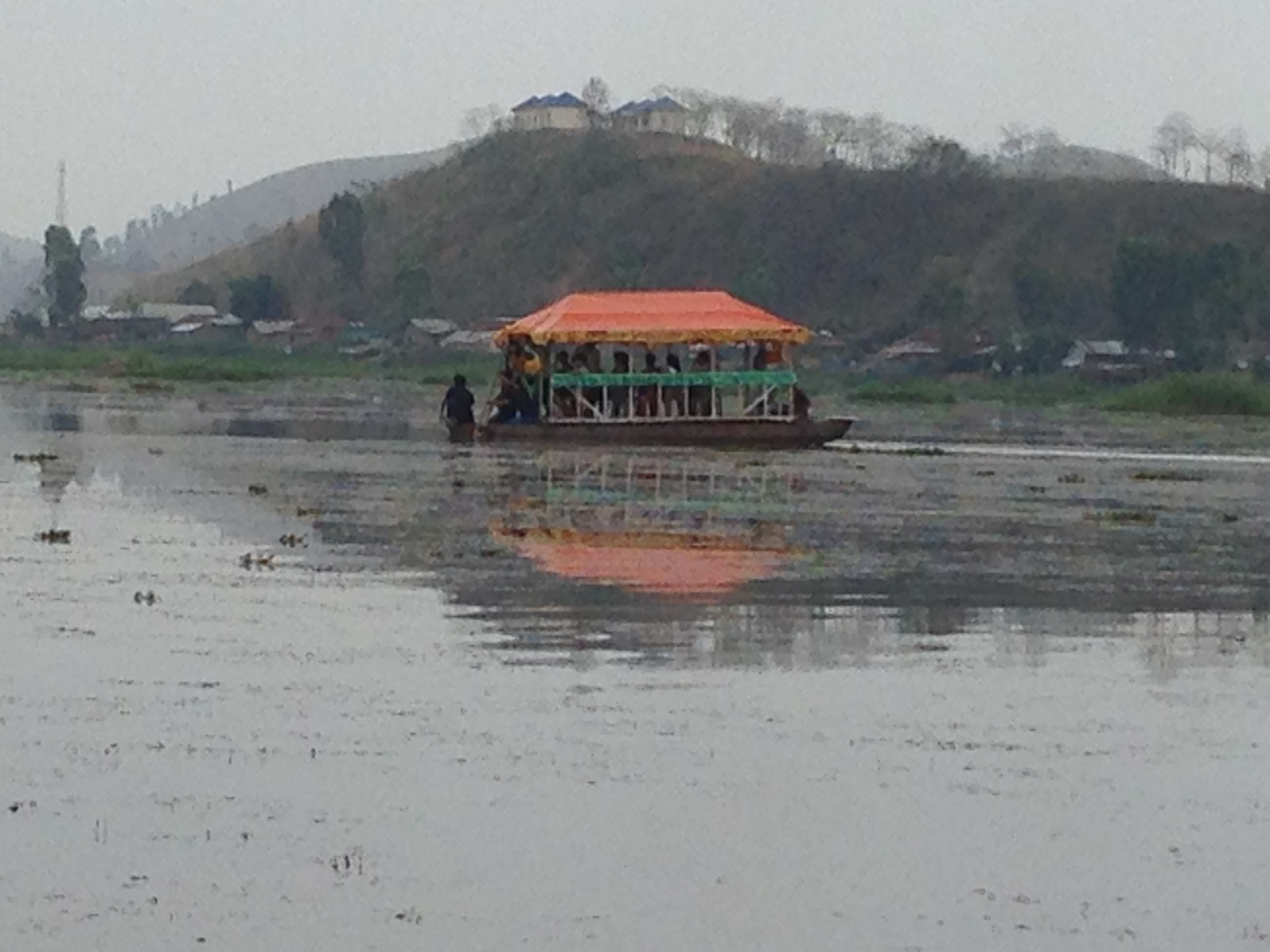
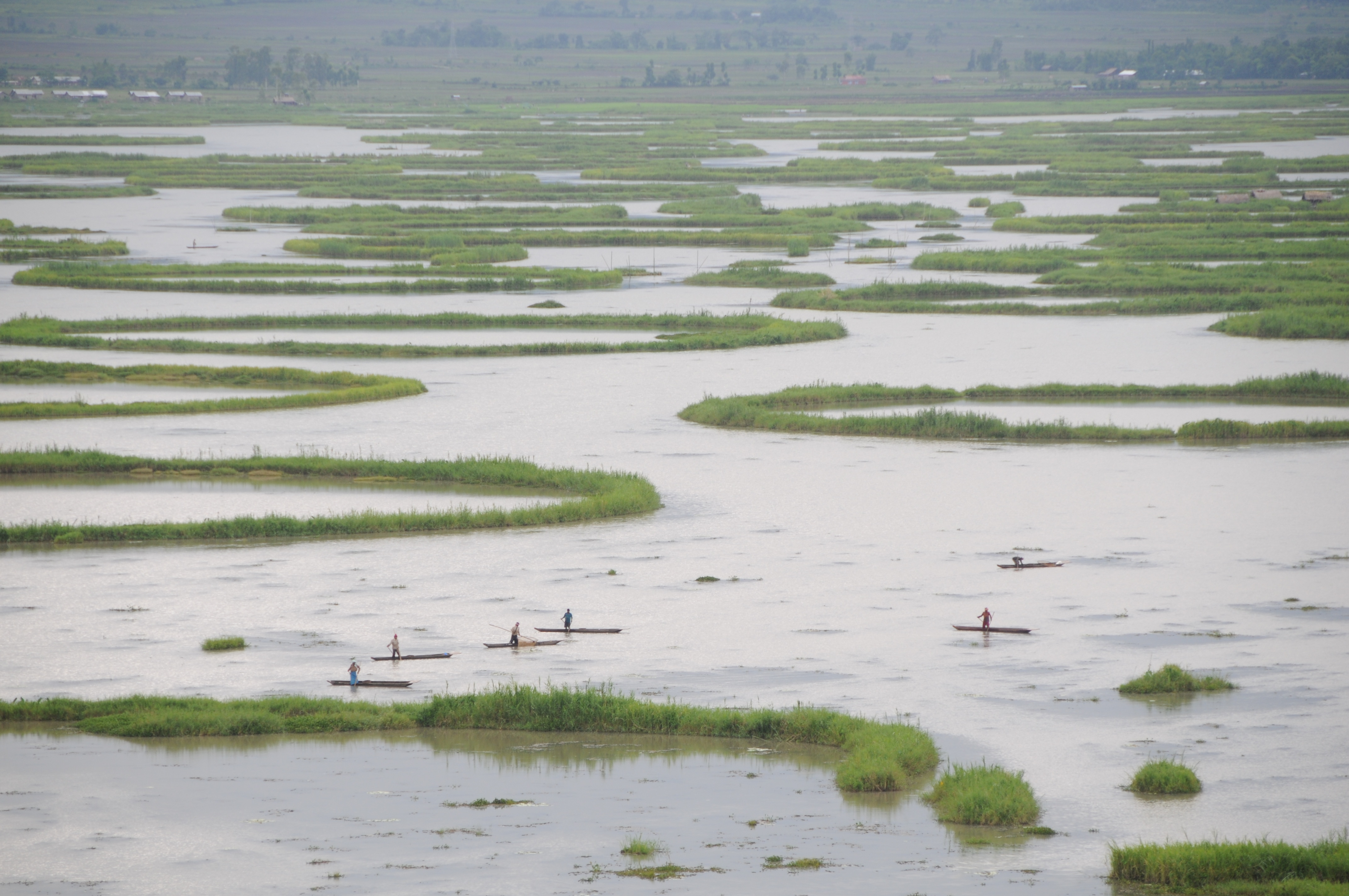
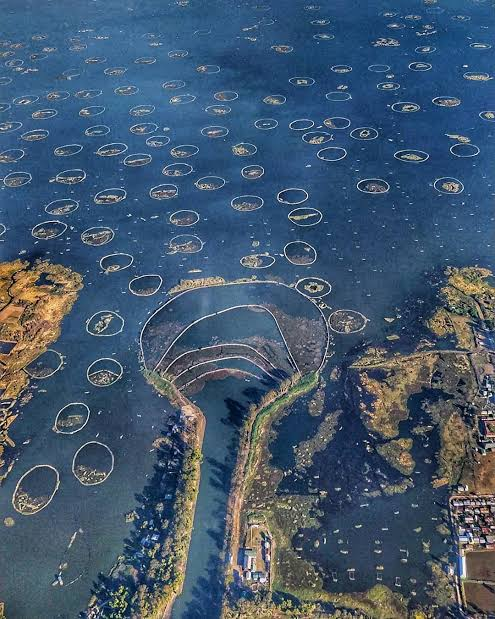
- Different scenes of the Loktak lake of Manipur

- Location within Manipur Location within India
- Interactive map of Loktak Lake
- Location: Manipur
- Coordinates: body 24°33′N 93°47′E
- Type: Fresh water (lentic)
- Primary inflows: Manipur River and many small rivulets
- Primary outflows: Through barrage for hydropower generation, irrigation, and water supply
- Catchment area: 980 km^{2} (380 sq mi)
- Basin countries: India
- Max. length: 35 km (22 mi)
- Max. width: 13 km (8 mi)
- Surface area: 250 to 500 km^{2} (97 to 193 sq mi)
- Average depth: 2.7 m (8.9 ft)
- Max. depth: 4.6 m (15.1 ft)
- Surface elevation: 768.5 m (2,521 ft)
- Islands: Thanga, Ithing, Sendra islands. Also many floating islands called phumdis or phumshangs
- Settlements: Imphal & Moirang

Ramsar Wetland
- Designated: 23 March 1990
- Reference no.: 463

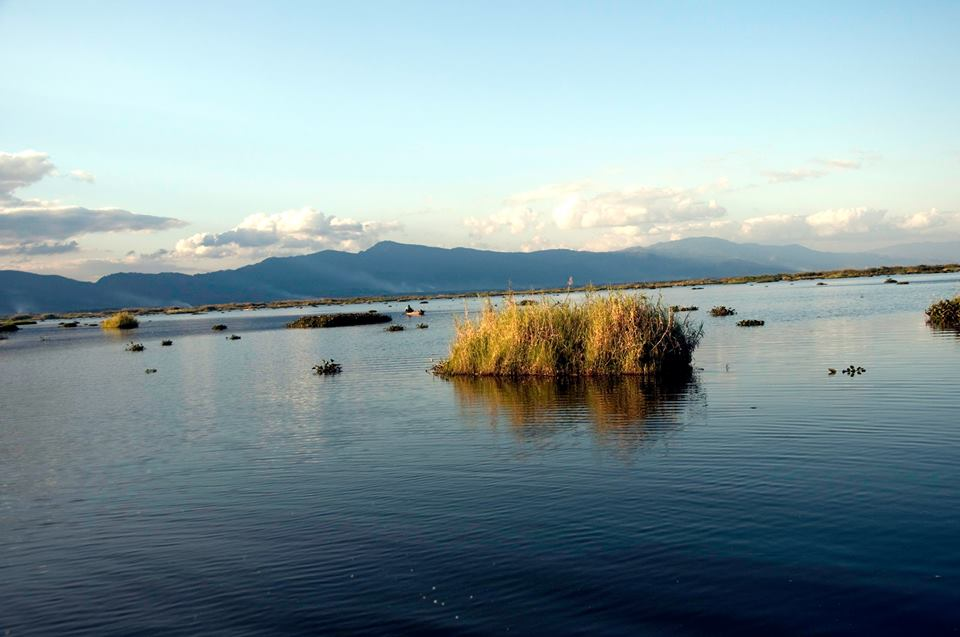
Loktak Lake in December 2016

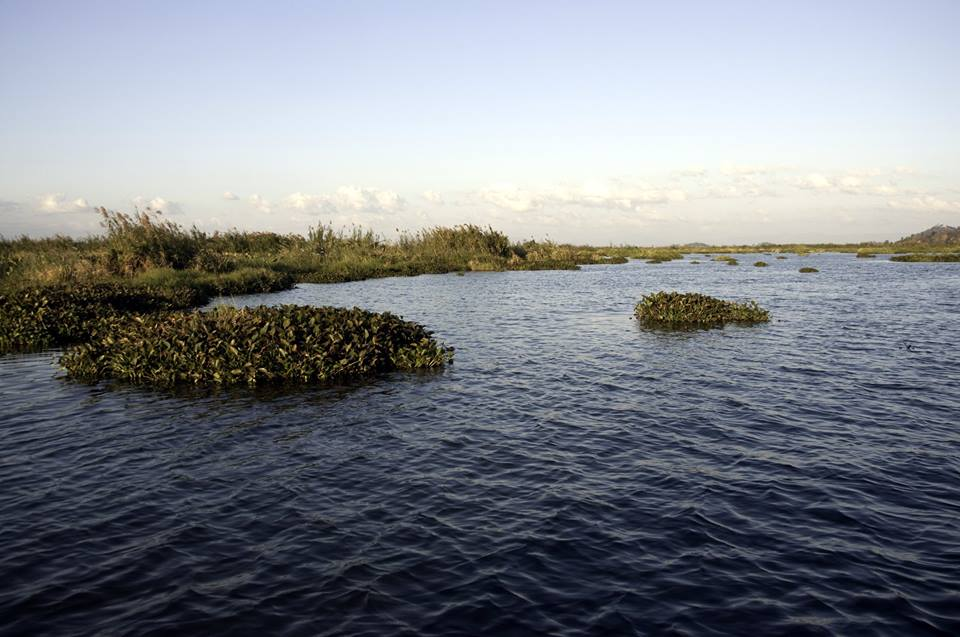
Loktak Lake, December 2016

Loktak Lake (Meitei: Loktak Pat) is the largest freshwater lake in Northeast India. It is a pulsating lake, with a surface area varying from 250 km^{2} to 500 km^{2} during the rainy season with a typical area of 287 km^{2}. The lake is located at Moirang in Manipur state, India. The etymology of Loktak is Lok = "stream" and tak = "the end" in Meitei language (Manipuri language). It is famous for the phumdi (heterogeneous mass of vegetation, soil and organic matter at various stages of decomposition that create distinctive semi-aquatic microhabitats) floating over it. The largest of all the phumdis covers an area of 40 km^{2} (15 sq mi) and is situated on the southeastern shore of the lake. Located on this phumdi, Keibul Lamjao National Park is the only floating national park in the world. The park is the last natural refuge of the endangered Sangai (state animal), Rucervus eldii eldii or Manipur brow-antlered deer (Cervus eldi eldi), one of three subspecies of Eld's deer.

The Loktak Day is observed every year on the 15th of October, at the periphery of the Loktak lake, in Manipur.

This ancient lake plays an important role in the economy of Manipur. It serves as a source of water for hydropower generation, irrigation and drinking water supply. The lake is also a source of livelihood for the rural fishermen who live in the surrounding areas and on phumdis, also known as "phumshangs". Human activities have led to severe pressure on the lake ecosystem. 55 rural and urban hamlets around the lake have a population of about 100,000 people. Considering the ecological status and its biodiversity values, the lake was initially designated as a wetland of international importance under the Ramsar Convention on 23 March 1990. It was also listed under the Montreux Record on 16 June 1993, "a record of Ramsar sites where changes in ecological character have occurred, are occurring or are likely to occur".

== Geography ==
=== Topography ===
Of the two river systems which drain the Manipur state: the Barak River and the Manipur River—the Manipur River flows through the Manipur Valley. The river rises in the north at Karong, flows south of Imphal and hence is also known as the Imphal River. Along its course through the valley downstream of Imphal, the bed slope of the river is gentle. The drainage pattern is sub-dendritic, sub-parallel and sub-radial, dictated by the structure and lithology of the area. Imphal, Iril and Thoubal River valleys also exhibit a meandering river course.

At the Ithai barrage outlet of the lake, the direct catchment area draining into the lake is 980 km^{2} (380 sq mi) out of which 430 km^{2} (170 sq mi) is under paddy cultivation, 150 km^{2} (58 sq mi) under habitation and 400 km^{2} (150 sq mi) under forest cover. The area of the lake is 236.21 km^{2} (91.20 sq mi), comprising large pockets of open water and marshy land formed at the southern part of the Imphal valley up to the confluence of Manipur River and Khuga River in the district of Imphal West. The Lake is divided into two zones, namely, the "Core Zone" which is the no-development zone or totally protected zone comprising 70.3 km^{2} (27.1 sq mi) and the balance area is called the "Buffer Zone". Within the lake and on its periphery, there are 14 hills of varying size and elevation; in the southern part of the lake are the Sendra, Ithing and Thanga islands.

==== Lake zonation ====
Geographically, in terms of biodiversity and pressure of human activities, the lake is broadly divided into northern, central and southern zones as elaborated below.

The Northern Zone, extending from eastern side of Nambol River near Ngaikhong Khunou to Phabakchao including Maibam Phumlak, has five main streams/rivers namely the Manipur river, Nambul, Yangoi river, Nambol river and Thongjaorok flowing into the lake. The zone is separated from the central zone by large phumdis (varying thickness of 0.4 to 4.5 m or 1.3 to 14.8 ft) that stretches from the northwest to the southeast. During January to March, phumdis in this area are usually burnt for construction of fish-cum-paddy farms; many large fish farms with raised levees have been built.

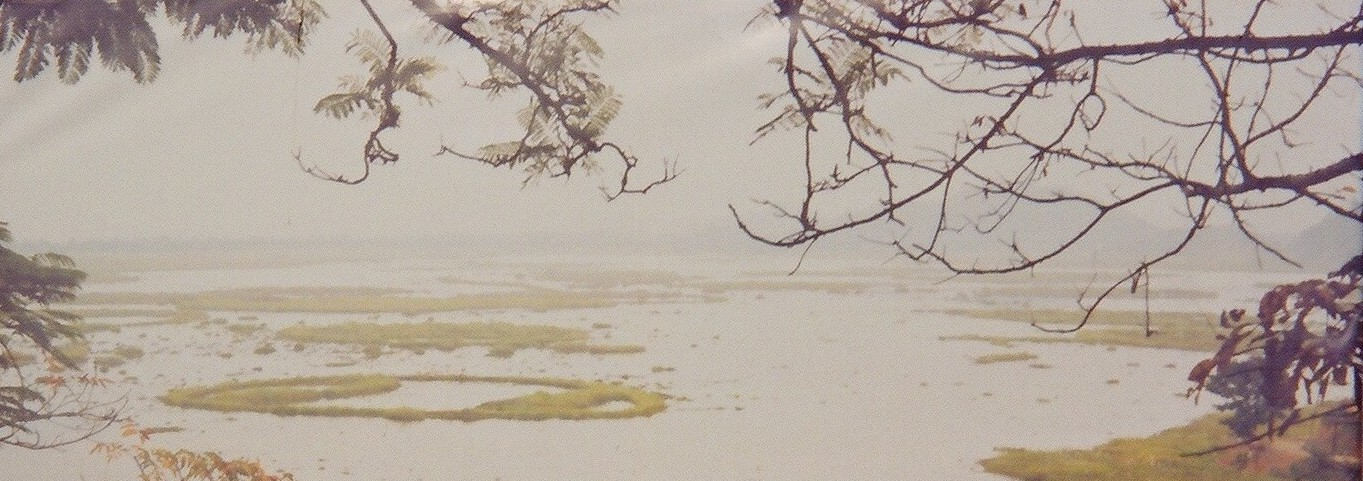
Phumdis in the Lake – circular ones, called athapums, are artificially created for fishing.

The Central Zone, extending from Awang Laisoi Pat (western side of Nambol River near Ngaikhong Khullen) to Laphu pat (between Khordak channel and Imphal River) encloses prominent islands of Thanga, Karang and Ithing. It has some sub zone viz Laisoi, Awangsoi, Yennapat, Tharopat etc. It is the main open water zone of the lake, which was relatively free from phumdis in the past, but over the years 'athaphums' (artificially created phumdis for fishing) constructed by villagers for fishing have proliferated choking the entire lake. The State Fisheries Department of Manipur has established a fisheries centre within this zone at Takmu Pat for fisheries development

The Southern Zone encompasses the Keibul Lamjao National Park, Ungamel and Kumbi pats at the southern part of the lake and the zone is linked with Khuga River by the Ungamel channel. The Imphal River is also linked with this zone by the Khordak channel. The western catchment drained by the Kangshoibi River flows into this zone. Proliferation of phumdis has been observed near the mouth of Ungamel channel, Kumbi pat, Nongmaikhong and Khordak area.

=== Geology ===
Cretaceous limestone, the Disang with serpentinites (Lower to Middle Eocene–Upper Cretaceous), the Surmas and the Tipams (Miocene) are the dominant rock formations in the catchment of the Manipur basin. Higher reaches of hills have the Disang and Tipam groups of rocks while Surma group occurs in the lower reaches. Grey sandstone–grit–conglomerate–limestone sequences intruded by serpentinites containing minor amounts of enstalite, chromite, amphiboles and magnetite constitute the Disang formation. Argillaceous and arneceous sequence represents the Surma and Tipam groups, respectively.

=== Climate ===
With an average annual rainfall of 1,183 mm (46.57 in), tropical monsoon climate prevails in the valley. Temperatures range from 0 to 35 °C (32 to 95 °F). February and March are the driest months.

=== Hydrology ===
The Loktak Lake is fed by the Manipur river and its several tributaries and ‘Ungamel Channel’ (Ithai Barrage) is its only outlet now. The origin of the Manipur river system and its tributaries, which flows in a north-south direction and drains into the lake is from the hill ranges immediately to the west of the lake. The five major rivers with indirect catchment area of 7,157 km^{2} (2,763 sq mi) are the Imphal (also called the Manipur River), the Iril, the Thoubal, the Sekmai and the Khuga. The other major streams which drain into the lake and which bring in lot of silt are the Nambul, the Nambol, the Thongjarok, the Awang Khujairok, the Awang Kharok, the Ningthoukhong, the Potsangbam, the Oinam, the Keinou and the Irulok. The Lake, located on the southern side of the Manipur river basin, is at the lowest elevation in the valley and no other major river flows into the lake, except a few rivulets.

Though hydrological data on river basin has not been adequately monitored, the Department of Earth Science, Manipur University has in its report of 1996 assessed the average runoff of Manipur River as 519,200 ha·m (4,209,000 acre·ft; 5.192 km^{3}) from a total catchment area of 697 km^{2} (269 sq mi) at the Ithai barrage. The ground water potential has been assessed estimated around 44 hm^{3} (36,000 acre⋅ft) per annum.

== Water resources development ==
Several water resources development projects have been built in the Manipur River basin to meet growing demands for irrigation. Seven river valley projects have been completed; these are the Singda Dam Project, Thoubal Dam Project and Khuga Dam Project which are of multipurpose type, the Imphal Barrage Project and the Sekmai Barrage Project—both medium irrigation projects. The most discussed project is the Loktak Multipurpose Project, which provides hydropower, irrigation and water supply benefits but has attracted adverse criticism for the drastic alteration caused by the project to the hydrological regime of the Loktak Lake and associated wetlands.

=== Loktak Multipurpose Project ===
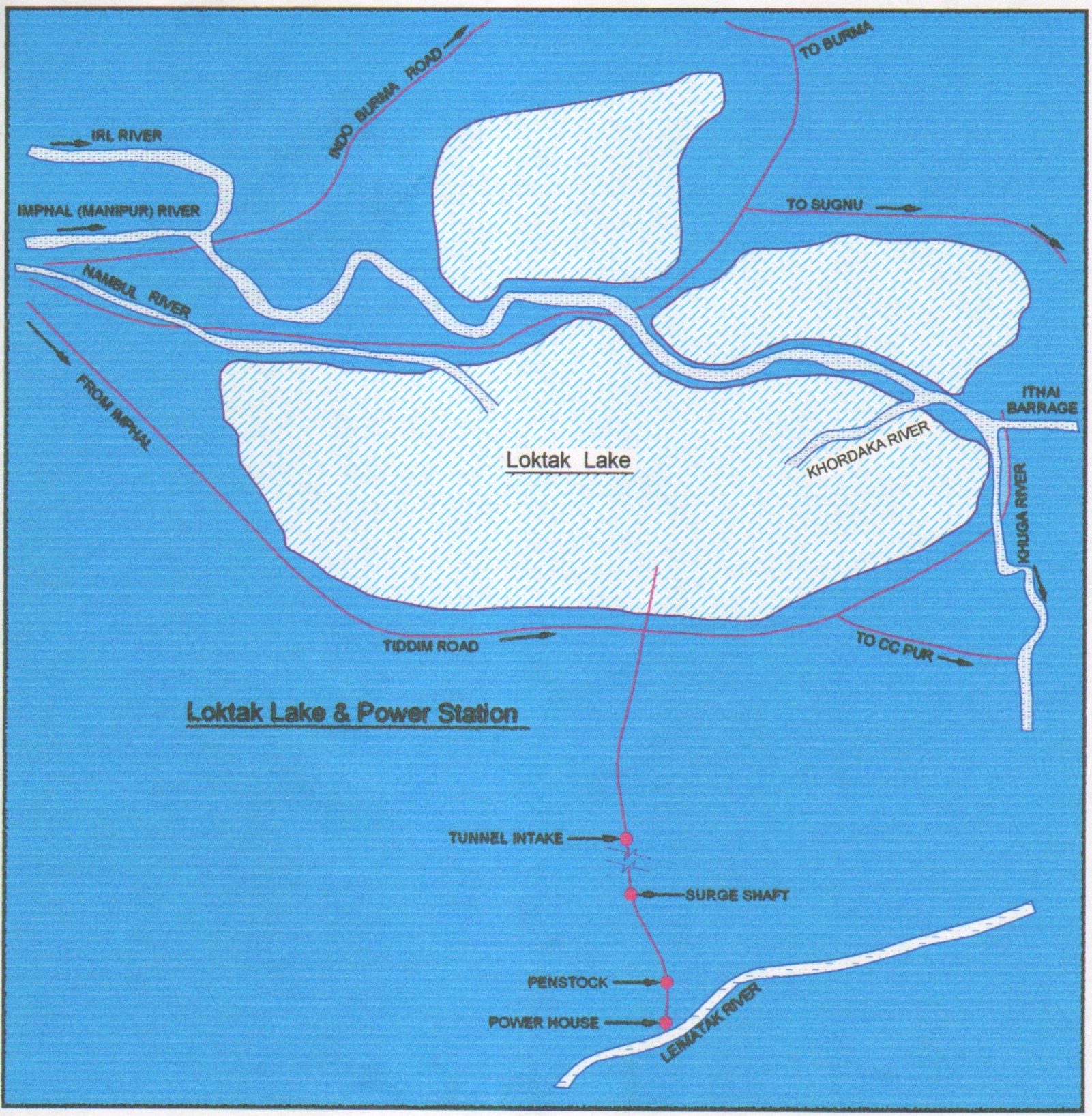
Loktak Lake and location of the Hydropower Project

The Loktak Hydropower Project on the Manipur River or Imphal River, with the Loktak Lake forming the head waters to provide regulated storage for power generation, was built in 1983 as a multipurpose project with power generation of 105 MW (3x35 MW) for power supply to Manipur, Nagaland, Assam, Mizoram, Arunachal Pradesh, Meghalaya and Tripura, and lift irrigation to an area of 23,000 ha (57,000 acres) in the Manipur valley. The main components of the project, as built, are, a) the Ithai Barrage, across the Manipur river of 10.7 m (35.1 ft) height and 58.8 m (192.9 ft) length with three spillway bays, b) water conductor system for trans-basin diversion comprising an open channel of 2.323 km (1.443 mi) length, a cut and cover section of 1.077 km (0.669 mi) length (bed width 18 m (59 ft), followed by a Head Race Tunnel of 3.81 m (12.5 ft) diameter (horseshoe type) and 6.62 km (4.11 mi) long to carry a discharge of 58.8 m^{3}/s (2,080 cu ft/s) (42 m^{3}/s (1,500 cu ft/s)) for power generation and 16.8 m^{3}/s (590 cu ft/s) for irrigation), c) a surge shaft, d) penstocks and e) a surface powerhouse and a tailrace channel on the right bank of the narrow Leimatak River with three units of 35 MW capacity each generating an annual energy of 448 GW·h (1.613 PJ). The downstream Loktak Power Project in cascade to utilize the regulated releases from the upper project for further power generation of 90 MW is proposed to be taken up for joint implementation by NHPC and the Government of Manipur. The project has invited severe criticism since the water level in the lake at the Ithai barrage is maintained throughout the year at FRL 786.5 m (2,580 ft) from considerations of power generation from the well planned water conductor system. The problem in the lake is, however, diverse; economic activities in and around the lake, and encroachments by 50,400 fishermen for extensive fishing activity are also cited to be some reasons. Other reasons for the distress situation in the lake are a) jhum (shifting) cultivation, b) extensive deforestation and unscientific land use practices in the catchment areas which bring large amount of silt into the lake and c) undefined ownership of the lake where the stakeholders are the districts of Imphal west district, Bishnupur and Thoubal causing lack of integrated approach to the lakes potential for providing benefits.

== Biodiversity ==
A rich biodiversity with habitat heterogeneity has been recorded during a scientific survey carried out between January 2000 and December 2002 in different habitat patches of the lake. The lake’s rich biological diversity comprises 233 species of aquatic macrophytes of emergent, submergent, free-floating and rooted floating leaf types. But in the declining trend of vegetation, the important flora recorded are as under.

=== Vegetation ===
The important vegetation of the phumdis (recorded are Eichhornia crassipes, Phragmites karka, Oryza sativa, Zizania latifolia, Cynodon spp., Limnophila spp., Sagittaria spp., Saccharum latifolium, Erianthus pucerus, Erianthus ravennae, Leersia hexandra, Carex spp.; Phragmites karka is reported to be the dominant species.

In the habitat patch with rooted floating plants, vegetation comprises the a) Nelumbo nucifera, b) Trapa natans, c) Euryale ferox, d) Nymphaea alba, e) N. nouchali, N. stellata and f) Nymphoides indica.

=== Fauna ===
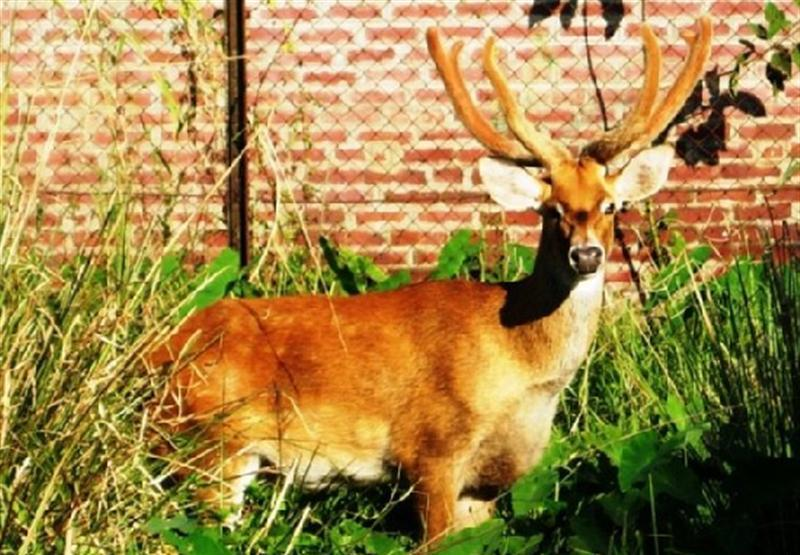
Endangered sangai species of Eld's deer, Manipur's state animal, in the lake precincts

57 species of waterbirds and another 14 species of wetland associated birds have been noted in the lake including 28 species of migratory waterfowl (most migrating from different parts of the Northern Hemisphere beyond the Himalayas). Also recorded were 425 species of animals—249 vertebrates and 176 invertebrates). The list includes rare animals such as the Indian python, sambhar and barking deer. Keibul Lamjao National Park is the natural habitat of one of the most endangered deer, the brow-antlered deer or Sangai (Cervus eldi eldi) which was once thought to be extinct, which was declared a national park only to preserve and conserve this species of Eld's deer. It also protects the critically endangered deer as it is a subspecies found nowhere else on Earth.

Avifauna

But the avifauna recorded in different habitats of the lake is reported to be declining. Briefly, the details of the avifauna recorded now are elaborated.

In the central part of the lake waterfowl, including dabbling ducks and diving ducks are reported but their numbers are declining due to proliferation of phumdis.

In the habitat part of the rooted plants, Hydrophasianus chirurgus, Metopidius indicus, and others were reported; once abundant now show a declining trend.

Small hillocks (though showing degraded condition) in the lake show big trees; birds of prey such as Milvus migrans lineatus and Circus aeruginosus have been recorded on these trees.

Species of hornbills found are the brown-backed hornbill, rufous-necked hornbill, wreathed hornbill, the pied hornbill and the great pied hornbill.

Aqua fauna

Fish yield from the lake is reported to be about 1,500 tonnes (6,600,000 lb) every year. The State Fishery Department has introduced millions of fingerlings of Indian and exotic major carps. Natural capture fishery without the requirement of any lease or licence was also in vogue in the lake. The lake fishery is now a mixture of capture and culture systems. Nine mini-hatcheries opened by the State Government has the capacity to produce one million fish fingerlings in a day. Fifty percent of the fingerlings produced were released into the Loktak Lake and the balance were distributed to beneficiary fishing committees. The new fish varieties introduced in lake were grass carp, silver carp and the old varieties of the local fishes like Channa punctata (ngamu), Anabas testudineus (ukabi), Anguilla (ngaril), pangba, tharak, and ngashap stated to be under serious decline.

Fauna

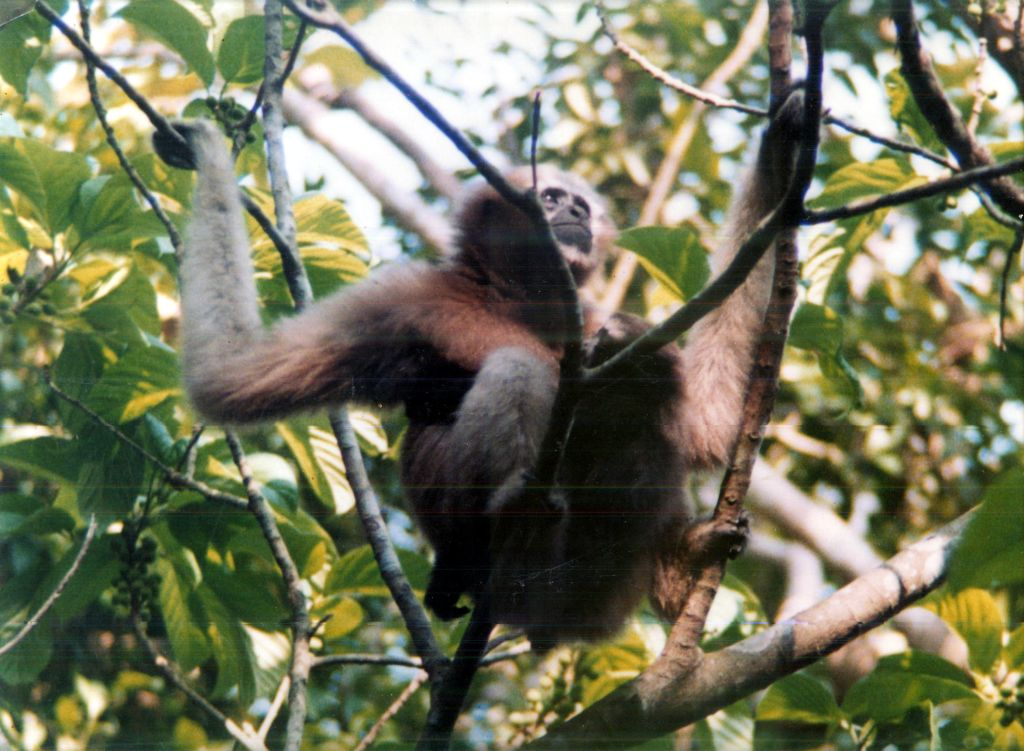
Hoolock gibbon seen in the precincts of the Lake in the Keibul Lamjo National Park

Fauna recorded in the precincts of the Lake in the Keibul Lamjo National Park are the Indian python, sambar, barking deer, the endangered sangai species of Eld's deer, wild bear, Muntiacus muntjak, rhesus monkey, hoolock gibbon, stump-tailed macaque, Indian civet Viverra zibetha, marbled cat and Temminck's golden cat.

== Threats ==
The Loktak lake and its precincts have faced serious problems due to loss of vegetal cover in the catchment area and construction of Ithai barrage at the outlet of the lake for multipurpose development of water resources. The issues are further elaborated below.

The degradation of the catchment area has occurred. Deforestation and shifting cultivation in the catchment areas have accelerated the process of soil erosion resulting in the lake’s shrinkage due to siltation. The annual silt flow into the lake is estimated to be 336,350 tonnes.

The nutrients from catchment area and domestic sewage from Imphal city carried by Nambul River are discharged into the lake affecting its water quality, thus encouraging the growth of water hyacinth and phumdis. All these activities have direct bearing on ecological stability of the lake. Interference in navigation and overall aesthetic value of the Lake are other reported adverse effects.

The construction of Ithai barrage and maintaining constant water level at full reservoir level (FRL) has led to: a) changes in hydrological regime thereby affecting ecological processes and functions of the wetland, b) inundation of agricultural lands and displacement of people from flooded lands and c) loss of fish population and diversity.

Recent analysis of the concentrations of some elements with FAO limits showed non detection of toxic elements like As, Cd, Hg, and Pb. To a certain extent, the water of the lake can be considered fresh in terms of trace elemental pollutants.

The thickness of phumdis have decreased in the Keibul Lamjao National Park thereby threatening the survival of sangai deer and interference in the migration of fishes from the Chindwin–Irrawaddy River system of Myanmar resulting in changes in the species composition.

The population of a number of economic plants such as Saccharum species, Setaria pumila, Alpinia nigra, Hedychium spicatum and the major food plants like the Zizania, Latifolia, Carex species, Coix species, Narenga has decreased resulting in starvation conditions for the endangered sangai deer. With the phumdis becoming thinner, the hoofs of the limbs of sangai get stuck in the marsh and results in their drowning. Production of the edible fruit and rhizome (thambou) of lotus plants has decreased to a great extent. Plants have also degraded due to polluted water.

Livelihood of people dependent on the sale of edible fruit and rhizome of lotus plant products and Euryale ferox (thanging) has suffered due to steep decline in the growth of these plant species.

Today, Loktak Lake is at the highest level of eutrophication and the only brow-antlered deer is at the verge of extinction.

== Loktak Development Authority ==
To address all the issues raised on the health of the lake, as detailed above, Government of Manipur has set up the Loktak Development Authority (LDA) under "The Manipur Loktak Lake (Protection) Act, 2006 (Manipur Act 3 of 2006)" with the objective "to provide for administration, control, protection, improvement, conservation and development of the natural environment of the Loktak Lake and for matters connected with as incidental thereto."

== Restoration actions ==
In order to address the various issues plaguing the functioning of the lake and the project dependent on it, a detailed project study was instituted by the Loktak Development Authority (LDA) & Wetlands International Asia (WISA) with funding provided by the India Canada Environment Facility (ICEF). A Project Report titled "Sustainable Development & Water Resources Management of Loktak Lake (SDWRML)" has been prepared. The report gives a review of its activities on the project done for over six years (from 1 February 1998 till the end of March 2004) with the following pertinent observations.

Based on all the analysis, the future approach suggested involves mitigation measures as elaborated are: i) The Nambol River carries sewage of nutrients of Imphal town into the lake which results in prolific growth of phumdis and deteriorates water quality. This is an urban problem and there is urgent need to treat and control this aspect, even if it is expensive; ii) Reduce soil erosion and sedimentation of the lake by enlarging the scope of micro-watersheds in the catchment area treatment plan; iii) Construct a channel through the Keibul Lamjao National Park to enable phumdis to settle at the bed of the lake; iv) Resolve the encroachment problem, by demarcating the lake boundary, which would result in a targeted and concerted action plan; v) Implement action plans that are economically viable and technically feasible resulting in livelihood enhancement such as evolving an attractive resettlement plan for the phumdi dwellers backed by remunerative livelihood program; and vi) Examine introduction of fishing net instead of Athapum (Athapam means phumdis in circular shape floating in the lake, planted or cultured artificially for catching fish) practiced presently to be dismantled. In November 2016, Environment ministry has taken keen interest in preserving the Loktak lake and has formed a panel of five members for this purpose.

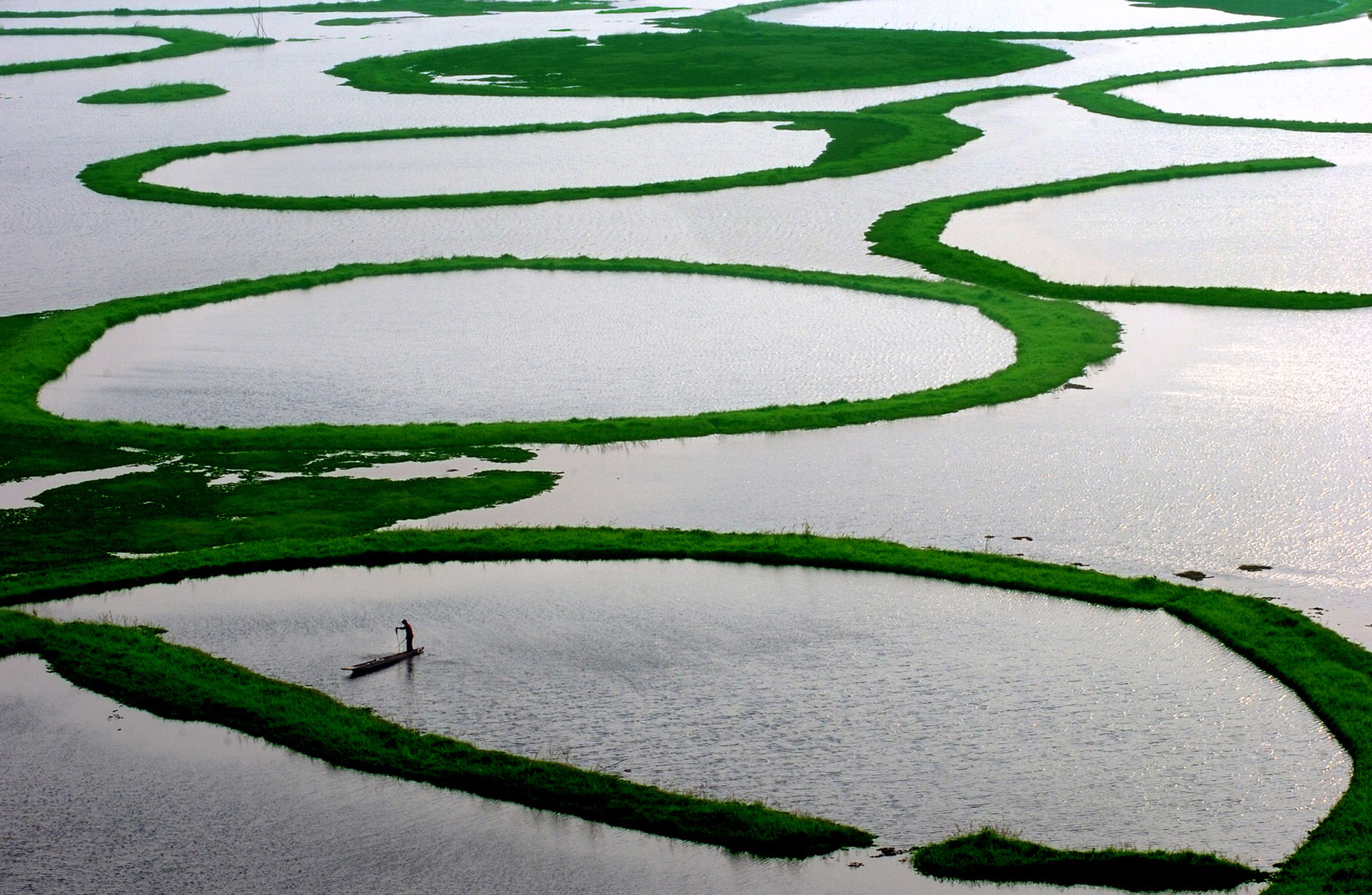
Fishing on Loktak Lake

== See also ==
- List of lakes of India
- List of volcanoes in India
