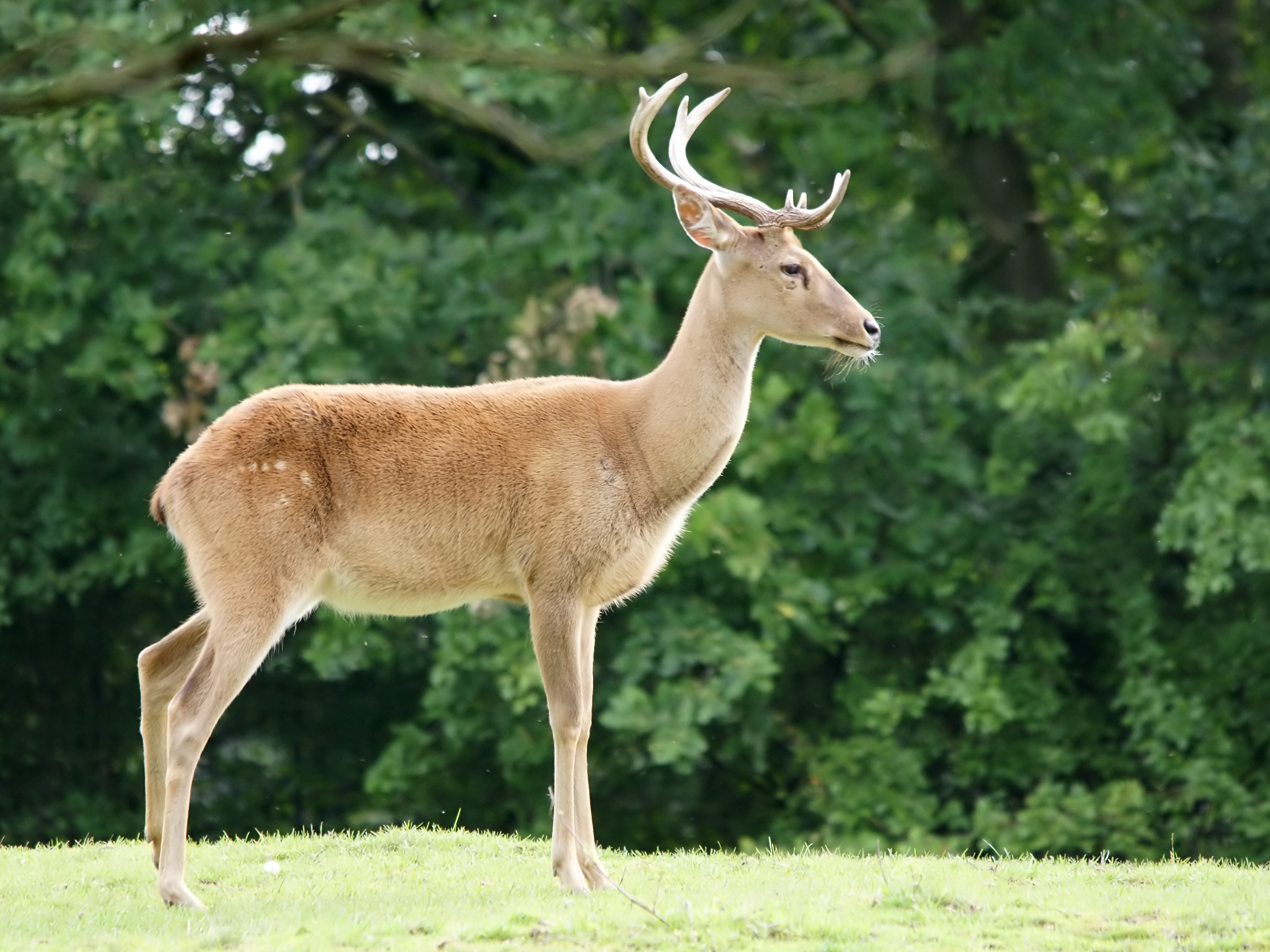
- Burmese brow-antlered deer at Chester Zoo

Conservation status
- Endangered (IUCN 3.1)
- CITES Appendix I

Scientific classification
- Kingdom: Animalia
- Phylum: Chordata
- Class: Mammalia
- Order: Artiodactyla
- Family: Cervidae
- Tribe: Cervini
- Genus: Rucervus; Pocock, 1943
- Species: R. eldii

Binomial name
- Rucervus eldii (McClelland, 1842)
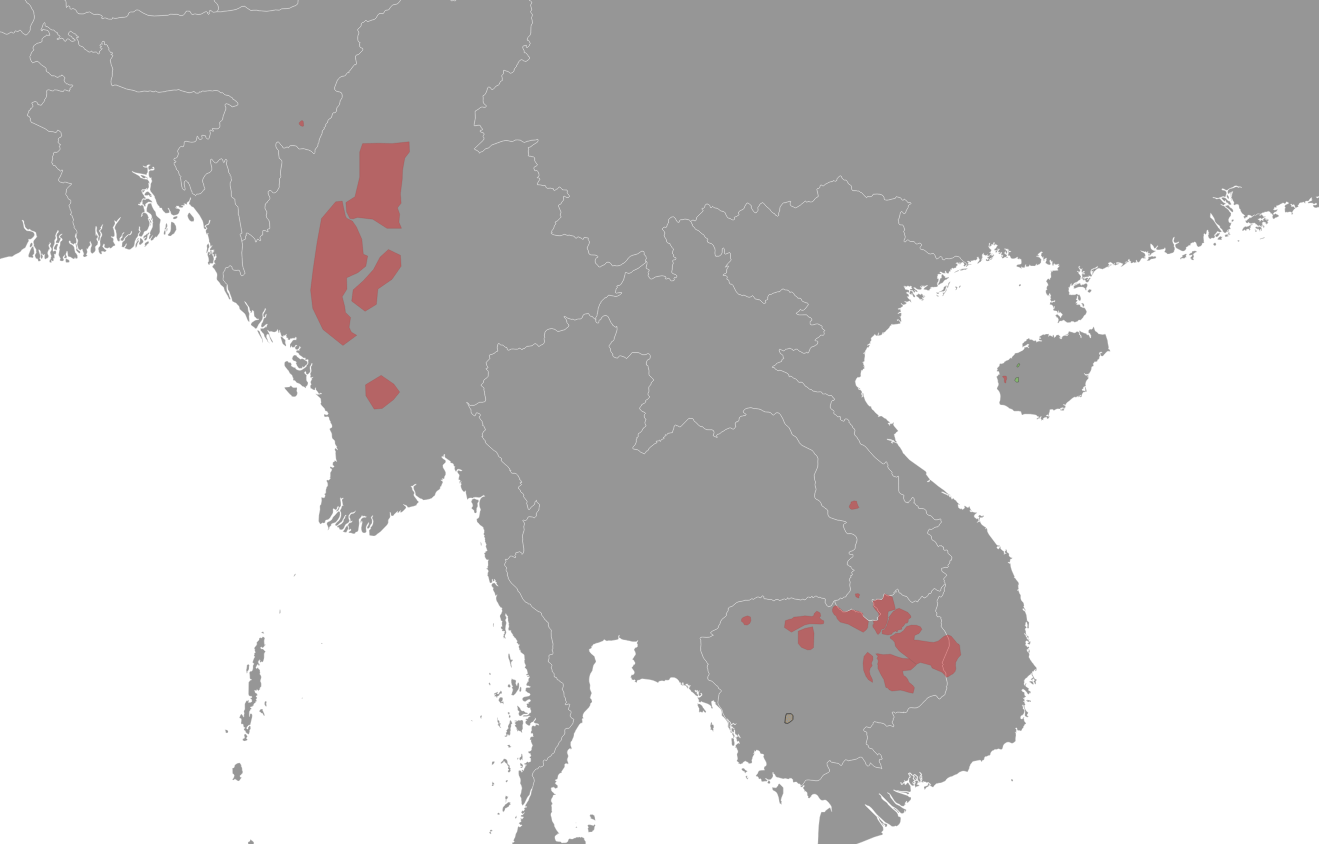

Synonyms
- Cervus eldii (McClelland, 1842); Rucervus eldii (Thomas, 1918); Panolia eldi McClelland, 1842; Panolia eldii Gray, 1850

= Eld's deer =

Eld's deer Temporal range: Middle Pleistocene-Present

Species of mammal found in Asia

Eld's deer (Rucervus eldii or Panolia eldii), also known as the thamin or brow-antlered deer, is an Endangered species of deer endemic to South and Southeast Asia. It inhabits wetlands and marshlands. It is active during the day and mates from February to June. Three subspecies are recognised. All three are threatened by hunting and deforestation.

== Taxonomy ==
The species was first described by John McClelland in 1840 based on specimens obtained in Manipur, India. It was described more detailed by Percy Eld in 1841; it was suggested to call the deer Cervus Eldii. McClelland coined the scientific name Cervus (Rusa) frontals in 1843. In 1850, John Edward Gray proposed the name Panolia eldii for the deer. It has recently been proposed that it should be moved back to the genus Panolia on the basis of recent genetic findings that place it closer to Pere David's deer than to other members of the genus Rucervus.

The three subspecies of the Eld's deer are:

- R. e. eldii: Nominate subspecies. The Manipuri brow-antlered deer is found in Manipur, India. It is called the sangai in Meitei.
- R. e. thamin: The Burmese brow-antlered deer found in Myanmar and westernmost Thailand.
- R. e. siamensis: The Thai brow-antlered deer is found in Cambodia, China, Laos, Thailand and Vietnam, and may be treated as a separate species. The population on the Chinese island of Hainan is sometimes considered another subspecies, P. e. hainanus, but this is not supported by genetic evidence. It was described by Lydekker in 1915.

== Appearance ==
The following measurements have been reported for the Eld's deer:

- Head–body length: 150–180 cm (59–71 in)
- Shoulder height: 110–125 cm (43–49 in)
- Tail length: 20–30 cm (8–12 in)
- Weight: 125–175 kg (276–386 lb)
- Antler length: 99 cm (39 in)

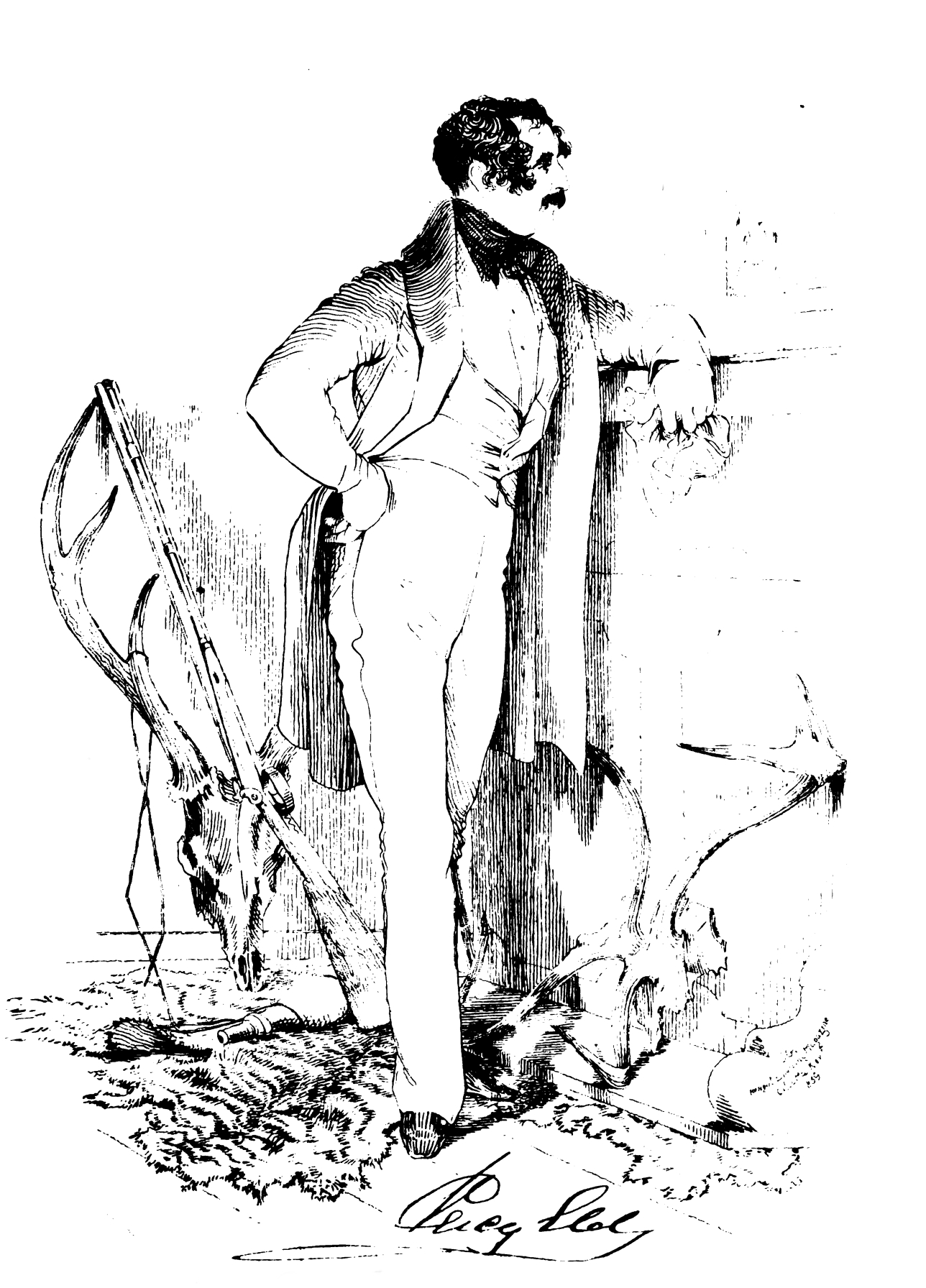
Lt. Percy Eld of the Bengal army, portrait sketch by Colesworthey Grant (1839)

The deer are generally of medium size and are similar to the size and shape of the related barasingha (R. duvaucelli). The species has a very regal and graceful Cervus-like physique. Its legs are thin and long and have a long body with a large head on a thin neck. The throat of a male has a thick mane of long hair. Males (stags) are taller and heavier than females (hinds or does). Their coats, rough and coarse, change colour with the season; in summer the colour is reddish-brown, while in winter, it turns dark brown, with males tending to be darker than the females. The tail is short in length and the rump has no distinct patch. Despite these features, they have actually related to the Père David's deer. The antlers, bow- or lyre-shaped, do not grow upwards, but tend to grow outwards and then inwards; a smaller branch grows towards the front of the head. The brow tines are especially long and noticeable. The brow-antlered deer is so named because they have long brow tines. The antlers of Eld's deer are structurally different from those of barasingha but have similarities to those of Père David's deer, consistent with the genetic relationship. They shed their antlers every year, with the largest size attained during the breeding season.

== Conservation status ==
The conservation status of three subspecies of Eld's deer, by country, are:

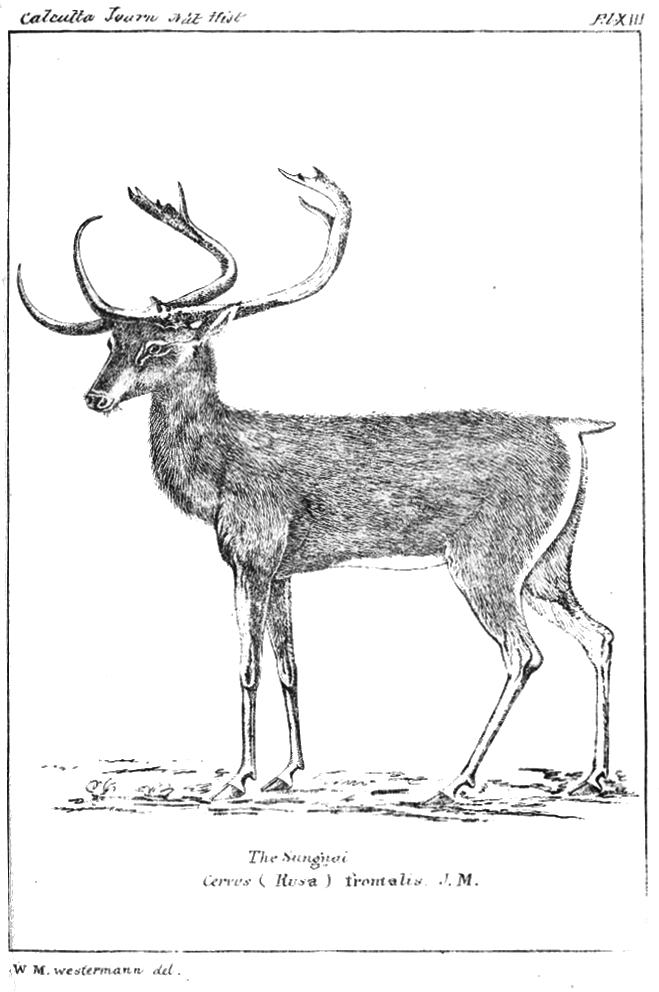
The first Western illustration of Eld's deer

=== India ===
The Keibul Lamjao National Park (KLNP), covering an area of 40 km^{2} (15.4 mi^{2}) of marshland called the Phumdis within the larger Loktak Lake, was gazetted in 1977 specifically to protect the Rucervus eldii eldii, the sangai in Meitei. Over time, public awareness and local support have evolved for conserving the subspecies of the endemic endangered Eld's deer. Concerted actions have been initiated to stop the encroachment of the park and adequate security arrangements have been made to stop poaching. This fact is very somberly presented in a story form in a popular children's magazine called Chandamama, which gives a first-person symbolic narrative by the affected 'deer' itself. The final conclusion by the deer, quoted below, concisely puts the security provided in the park in a proper perspective.

" 'Thanks to these youngsters who live nearby', he said. I was happy and felt indebted to the youngsters for saving our lives. My friend added that these people really loved and respected the Sangai deer. They believed that killing the Sangai was an unpardonable sin. According to a Meitei legend, the Sangai are the link between humans and nature. So, killing us would mean breaking a bond. My friend informed me that people concerned about animals like us have formed a group. They teach others to protect animals, too.

The news that people are trying their best to save the phumdis, deer like me, and the Loktak Lake, infuse new hope in me. 'How nice of them!' I thought.

Anyway, it is getting dark and my friend and I have to return to our herd. And those of you who are around can enjoy our dancing gait as we trot back home. It would be great if I could meet you again. We could dance together at KLNP, if you can make it here some time!"

The home range of brow-antlered deer in the park is confined to 15–20 km^{2} (5.8–7.7 mi^{2}) in the southwestern part of the lake where phumdis on which the deer thrive are abundant. A study conducted on the proportion, on the basis of body weight of stag, hind and fawn, is reported to be 4:2:1. The sangai distribution dictated by shelter and availability of food is high near Toyaching, Pabotching and the Yang Kokchambi area.

Censuses conducted by the wildlife wing of the Forest Department in 1975, 1990, 2000, and 2003 have shown the Eld's deer population was 14, 76, 162 and 180, respectively. The 2000 survey of 162 deer included 54 stags, 76 hinds and 32 fawns. The reports of 2004 indicate a figure of 182 as referred in another section here, which shows the subspecies in Manipur is on the rise.

A successful captive breeding programme is underway at the Alipore Zoological Gardens in Kolkata, and many specimens of the deer have been bred here.

=== Myanmar ===
For the protection of the thiamin subspecies of the Eld's deer, Chatthin Wildlife Sanctuary and Shwesettaw Wildlife Sanctuary (both protected sanctuaries) and Alaungdaw Kathapa National Park were chosen. Chatthin Wildlife Sanctuary, with an area of 104 mi^{2} (269.4 km^{2}) in Myanmar's central plains, 125 mi^{2} (323.7 km^{2}) northwest of the city of Mandalay, has Indaing deciduous broadleaf forest dominated by Dipterocarpus tuberculatus and is the habitat for four species of deer: thamin, muntjac (Muntiacus muntjac), hog deer (Axis porcinus), and sambhar (Rusa unicolor). Subject to indiscriminate hunting in the past (till the ownership of guns was controlled after the 1960s), the thamin, highly threatened, now has a population of about 1,000. Initially, the Smithsonian National Zoo acquired a few thamin for observations and subsequently shifted a few to its Conservation and Research Center at Front Royal, Virginia for biological study. For a cross–check of the biological studies done at the research center, the Smithsonian Institution selected the Chatthin Wildlife Sanctuary, a protected park. Special studies on the thamin deer were conducted by the conservation scientists headed by Christen Wemmer of the Smithsonian. They gathered details on the biology and survival of the species by duly correlating with the changes that occurred in the ecology of the region of the Chatthin Wildlife Sanctuary. Under the research project study, the ecology of thamin and a series of training courses in biodiversity were organised. The thamin's life cycle studies on 11 male and eight female radio–collared deer, supported by field studies by the scientists, revealed:

1. Its life cycle was well-tuned to the seasonal rhythm of its environment.
2. An average group size was 2.5 per 1.6 km^{2} (0.62 mi^{2}); deer mother with young appeared to be the basic social unit.
3. Males were in velvet when they were in bachelor groups.
4. After new grass sprouts in the ashes of February and March fires, they gathered to graze on tender shoots.
5. Males moved through the herds seeking receptive females.
6. March and April were the months of rut.
7. Males with their newly hardened antlers were in a state of anorexia and sexual obsession during this period.
8. They operated in a specific home range of about 3.5 mi^{2} (9.1 km^{2}) to 2.7 mi^{2} (7.0 km^{2}).
9. When food was short, some animals migrated into farmland for a few months before returning to the park; during the day they hid in small patches of degraded forest and at night they forayed into the croplands.

Smithsonian National Zoological Park, which has been closely associated with the preservation of the thamin deer, has in its conclusive observations stated:

"Chatthin Wildlife Sanctuary (CWS) in Myanmar (Burma) protects the largest population of the endangered Eld's deer left in the world. It also represents one of the largest remaining patches of dipterocarp forest–a dry forest that is one of the most threatened and least protected forest types globally. Local people rely on these forests for their livelihood. The forests provide wood, food, shelter, and medicine. Restricting people's access to these forests by declaring them protected is probably not a sustainable solution and will put greater burden on lower income households potentially increasing poverty. However, if people continue to use and abuse forests unregulated they will disappear and with them the Eld's deer and many other species."

With external funding for such protection drying up, though, the efforts had not yielded encouraging results and the conclusion was the conditions were not conducive even to protect the protected parks given the political and funding situation in the country.

The picture is not encouraging in Cambodia, Laos and Vietnam, either. The Burmese brow-antlered deer is 'Near Threatened' and still occurs in reasonable numbers.

=== Thailand ===
The situation of protected areas for the Eld's deer is much worse in Thailand and along its border areas with Laos and Cambodia; it is feared that it may be difficult to prevent the "decline and likely extirpation of Eld's deer from the wild in Thailand".

=== Other countries ===
In Cambodia, Laos and Vietnam, Eld's deer was hunted for the traditional medicinal trade (particularly of this subspecies) and to meet demand for captive animals (especially from zoos) and forest habitat was degraded (deforested) to meet agriculture and infrastructural developments. The subpopulation in Hainan considered as a subspecies by Chinese conservationists was almost extinct in the wild.

In the Savannakhet Province of Laos, conservation efforts centred around community management caused the local population to increase from 80 to 170. A 130,000 hectare National Eld's Deer Sanctuary was created in the area.

== Assessment ==
In over 200 recent years of known history, the number of this species has declined substantially. Based on estimated rates of the decline of this species assessed in three generations (supposed to be at least a 15-year period) for all the species, the average value is reported to be in excess of 50%. Based on this assessment, IUCN has categorised the species as Endangered. In this assessment for determining the species-level, the numbers in India were considered to be numerically small (also found to be increasing), hence the numbers of wild populations only of Eld's deer P. e. thamin in Myanmar and P. e. siamensis of Cambodia, Laos and Vietnam were considered. The decline in population has been mainly attributed to hunting. In the case of the Myanmar thamin, the decline is discernible but not striking. The categorization is considered a middle-ground situation considering the extensively diverse conditions and conservation trends in the geographically isolated and distinct populations of this species.

== Subspecies ==
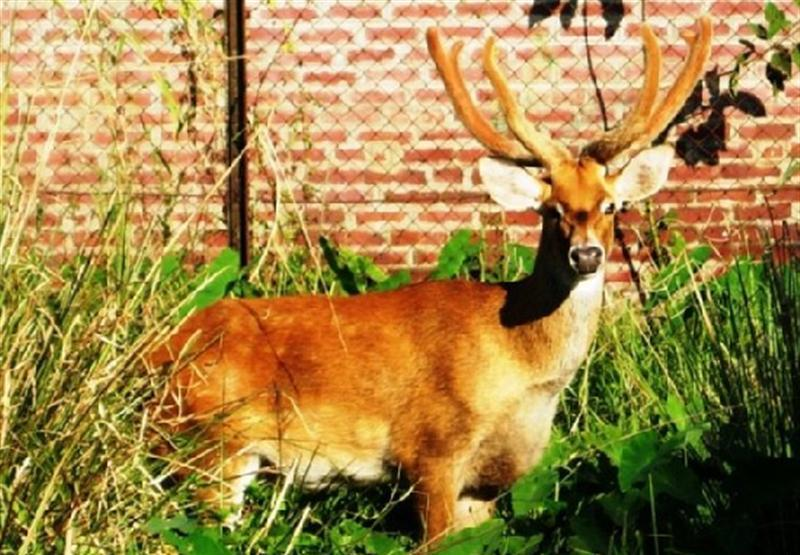
Rucervus eldii eldii or sangai in Manipur, where it is also the state animal

=== Breeding ===
Female Eld's deer are generally found alone or in pairs with their young, but during the mating season, females and their young gather in herds of up to 50 individuals. Males also move around singly except during mating season. When rutting takes place, males compete with each other to gain control of a harem of females with which they can then mate. After a long gestation period, normally a single calf is born. The young have white spots at birth which fade away as they grow; they are weaned at seven months of age, and become sexually mature from 18 months of age onwards. The gestation period for three species is 220 to 240 days, with birthing occurring:.

- For Manipur deer, between October and end of December
- For the Burmese thamin, between October and November
- For the siamensis deer in Thailand, Laos, and Cambodia, between October and November

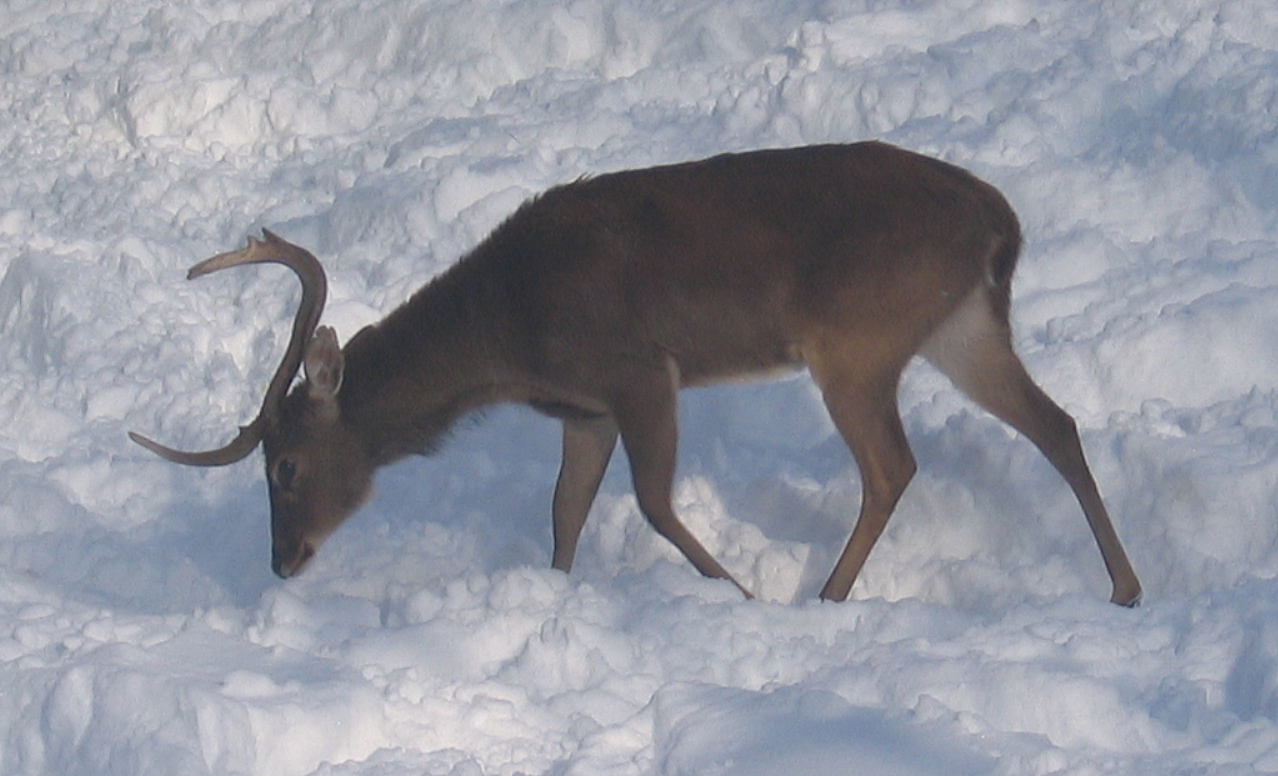
Rucervus eldii thamin of Myanmar and Thailand

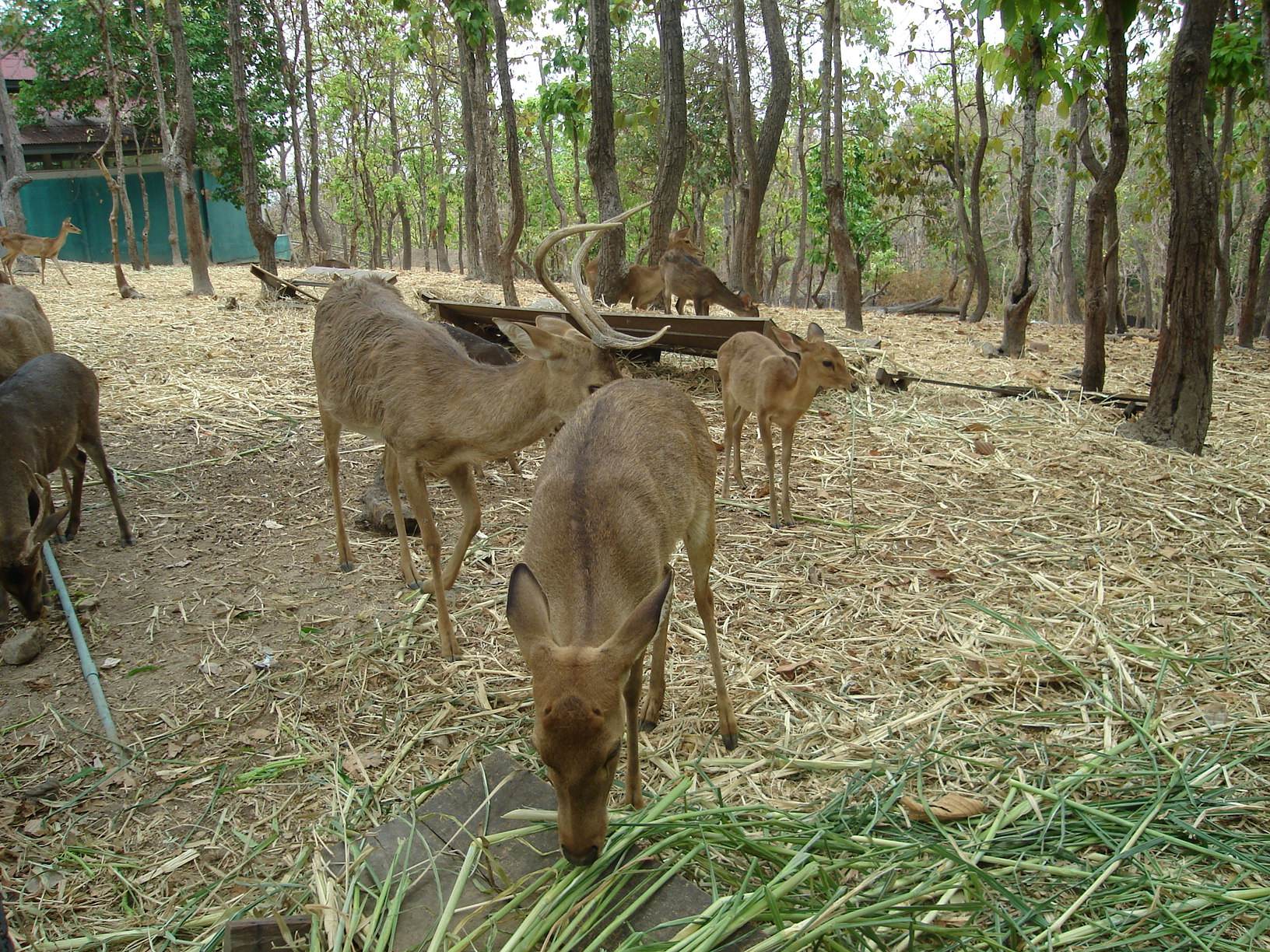
Rucervus eldii siamens of Thailand, Laos, Cambodia, and Vietnam

=== Numbers in the wild ===
In India, the Eld's deer sangai subspecies is confined to the peculiar floating bog called Phumdis in Loktak Lake and is numbered at less than a few hundred animals. The subspecies P. e. siamensis, which occupied the vast monsoon forests from Thailand to Hainan was extinct in Thailand, very few in number in Laos and Cambodia, and almost extinct in Vietnam. A few hundred deer were protected in a large enclosure in Hainan Island, China. The estimated figures are:

- 180 animals (2004) of P. e. eldii in Manipur, India
- 2,200 (United Nations estimate) – 1992 survey for P. e. thamin of Burma and Thailand
- In low tens (2004)– for P. e. siamensis, considered as possibly extirpated in Laos, Cambodia, and Vietnam

=== Numbers in captivity (zoos) ===
In 2003, the estimated number of captive animals of the three subspecies in zoos were 180 P. e. eldii, 1100 P. e. thamin and 23 P. e. siamensis.

== Ecology ==
Habitats of each subspecies include:

- R. e. eldii of Manipur, India is associated with wetlands. It has adaptations of the hooves (feet) to move easily in their marshland (boggy ground) habitat of phumdis. It lives in significantly different ecosystems compared to other subspecies and in divergent morphology. Antlers are shed every year and reach their largest size during the breeding season.
- R. e. thamin of Burma and Thailand are not associated with wetlands and live in three forest types: indaing forest (dominated by the tree Dipterocarpus tuberculatus) equivalent to deciduous dipterocarp forest (dipterocarp trees which belong to the family Dipterocarpaceae are resinous trees found in the Old World tropics) of Indochina and Thailand, deciduous forests of dry (thandahat), and mixed (teak).
- R. e. siamensis of Thailand, Laos, Cambodia, and Vietnam are not associated with wetlands. They are found in deciduous dipterocarp forests.

== Behavior ==
Some observations on the habits of Eld's deer common to all three subspecies are:

- active most of the time; they seek shelter from the midday sun and migrate for short periods seeking water in the dry season and food in the growing season
- seek areas that are seasonally burned in search of new grasses that grow after the burn
- their diets comprise a variety of grasses, herbaceous plants, and shoots, grasses, fruit and wetland plants and they poach into cultivated crops to graze and browse in nearby fields of rice, lentils, maize, peas and grapes.

== Threats ==
Thamin are prized as game by hunters due to their impressive antlers and hides that are in demand in local markets. They are also widely hunted for food; they were believed to have been used to feed armies during many Asian wars. Their population has additionally declined due to intense development activities necessitating reclamation of land for grazing, cultivation and fish farming within their range. In Myanmar, deforestation of the dipterocarp forests is cited as a reason for the threat faced by the thamin deer. The habitat available for their protection is very limited; only 1% of the protected forests are suitable for its protection in South Asia. Even in protected areas, the animals are poached. Another striking problem is finding adequate funds and political will to protect the species. The species have a fragmented distribution and are therefore at risk from inbreeding and loss of genetic variation. The film The Return of Sangai is a documentary by George Thengummoottil about the species in Keibul Lamjao National Park.

The decrease of Eld's deer populations may be due to predation by Burmese pythons.
