= Nambul River =

River in Manipur, India

Coordinates: 24.7044°N 93.8427°E

The Nambul River is a river in Manipur state, northeastern India, which flows through the heart of Imphal city.

The Nambul river is one of the main perennial sources of water for the Loktak Lake. The Nambul river is also one of the primary inland waterways that connected the villages of the southern and eastern part of the valleys and hills of Manipur with the main commercial and market hub in Imphal, the Khwairamband Keithel, in the past. This perennial river, which was of immense economic importance to Manipur until recent times has now been designated by town planners as ‘Nambul Nala’ (Nambul drain) or its tributary ‘Naga Nala’.
