= Manipur River =

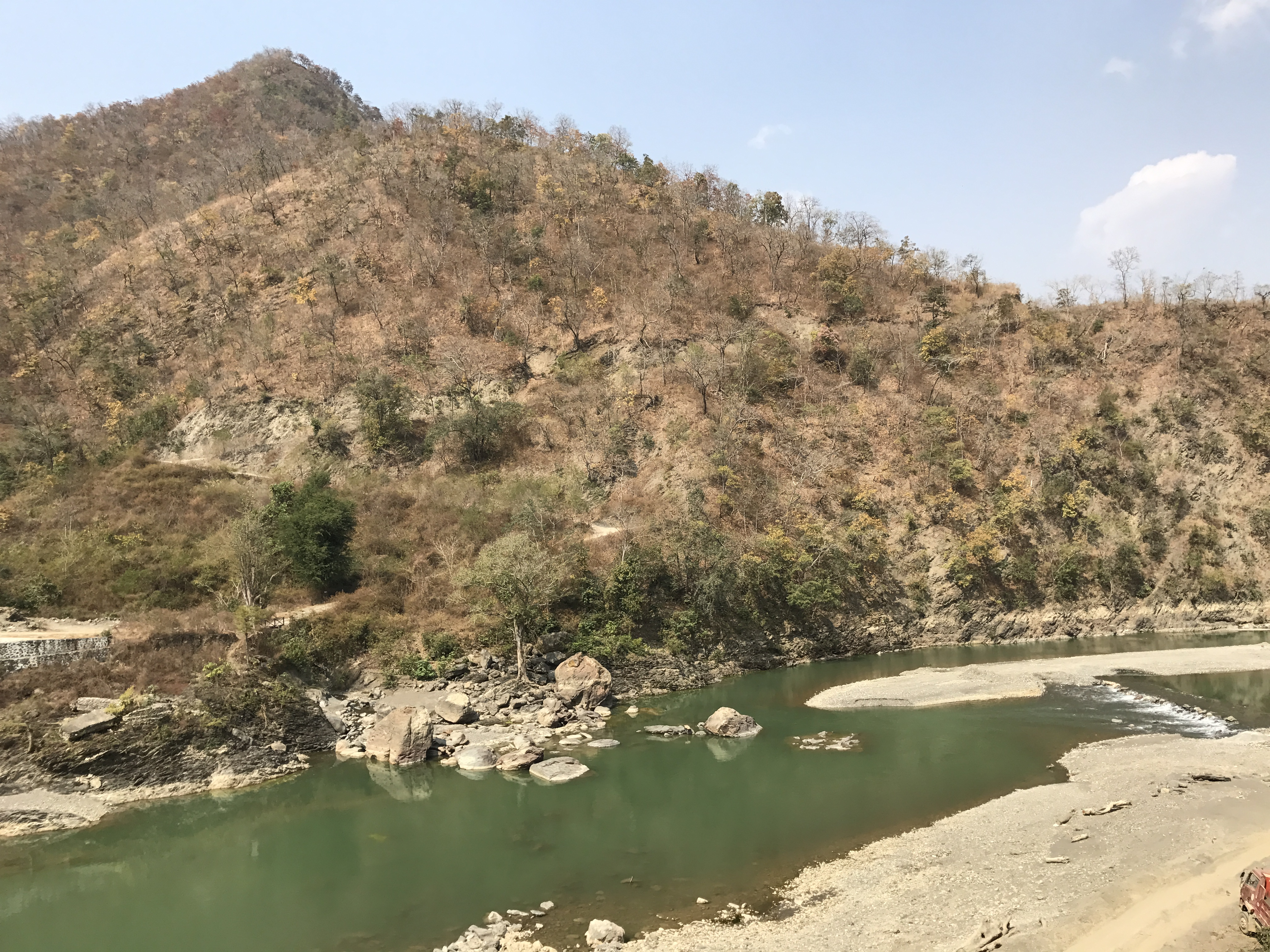
- Manipur River flows through Chin Hills near Tedim Town

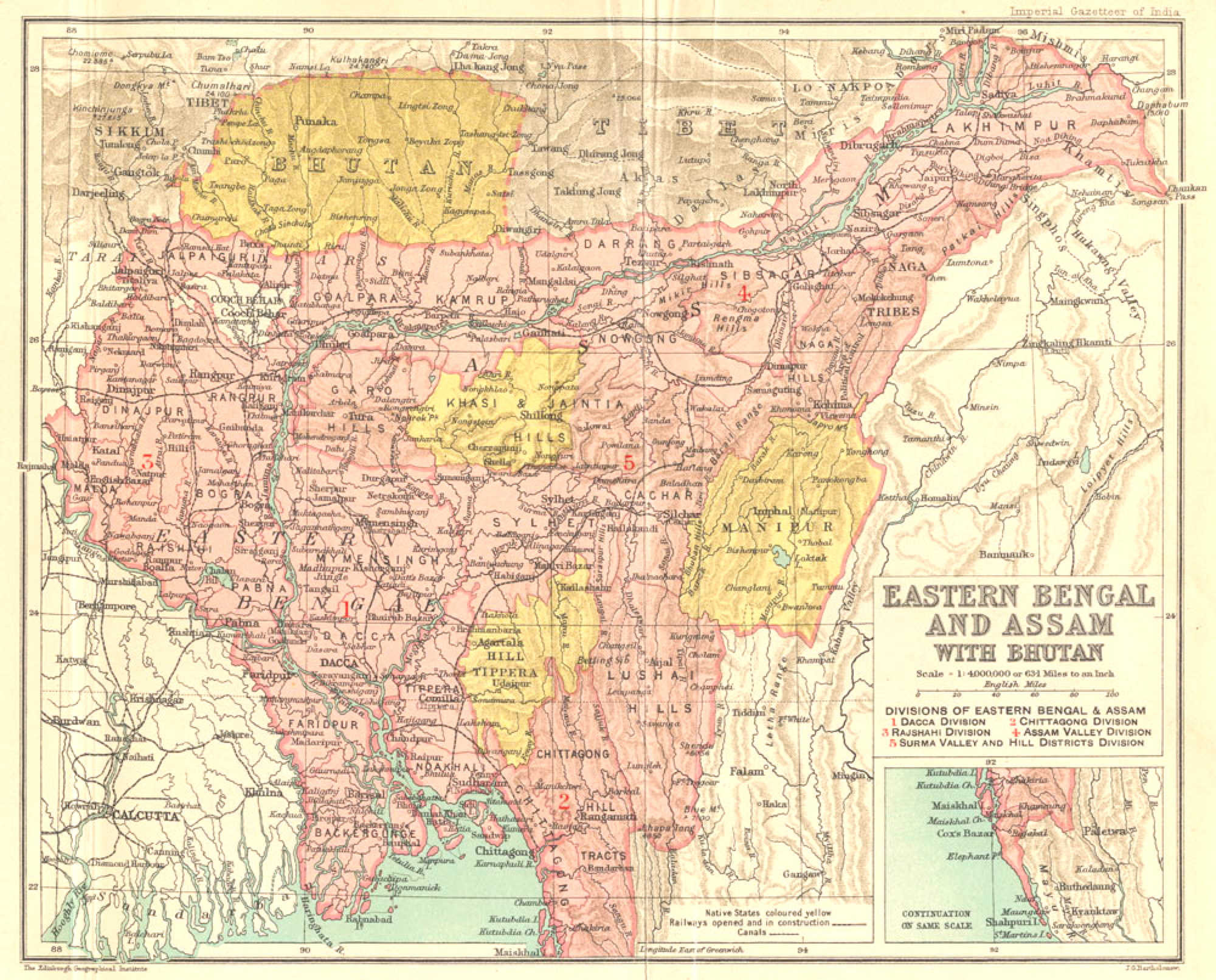
- Native name: Meitei: Manipur Turel

Location
- Country: India / Myanmar
- State: Manipur

Physical characteristics
- Source: Ithai Barrage, Waipokpi
  - coordinates: 24.4297589°N 93.838581°E
- Mouth
  - location: Myittha
  - coordinates: 22°53′12″N 94°05′07″E

Basin features
- Tributaries
  - right: Chakpi River

Manipur River (Burmese: မဏိပူရမြစ်, romanized: Manipur Myit), also called Kathe Khyoung (Burmese: ကသည်းချောင်း, lit. 'Meitei watercourse'), is a river in India's Manipur state and Myanmar's Chin State. The Manipur River is formed by the joining of the Imphal River and Khuga River near the village of Ithai, and flows southward into the Chin State of Myanmar. After flowing through the townships of Tonzang, Tedim and Falam, it turns east and flows into the Kabaw Valley. There it merges with the Myittha River, which flows north in the Kale Township, and turns right near Kale and drains into the Chindwin river.

== Tributaries ==
- Leimakhong River
- Kongba River
- Iril River
- Thoubal River
- Imphal River
- Khuga River
- Chakpi River

== See also ==
- List of rivers of Burma
- List of rivers of India
