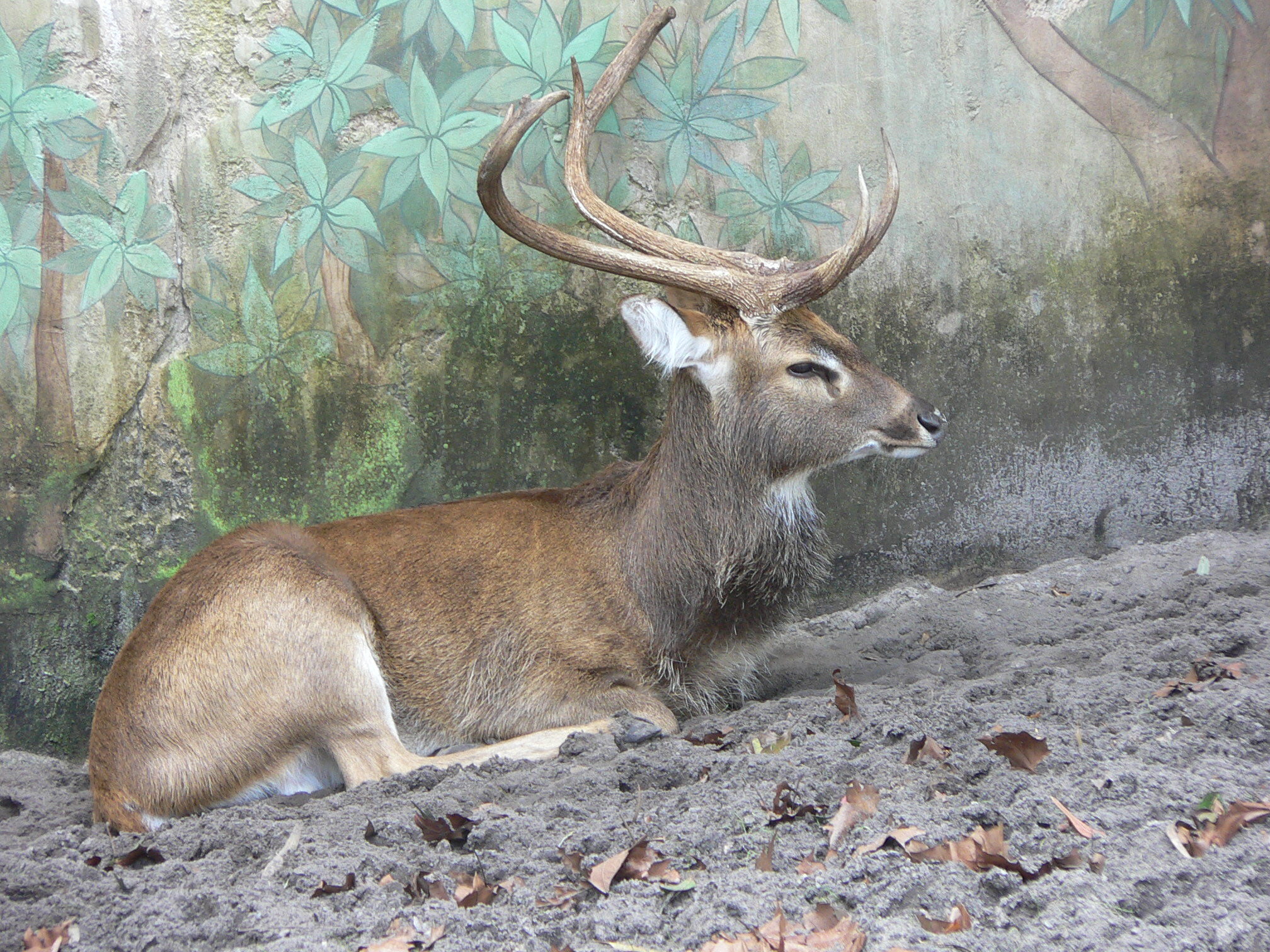

Scientific classification
- Kingdom: Animalia
- Phylum: Chordata
- Class: Mammalia
- Order: Artiodactyla
- Family: Cervidae
- Genus: Rucervus
- Species: R. eldii
- Subspecies: R. e. eldii

Trinomial name
- Rucervus eldii eldii (McClelland, 1842)

= Sangai =

Subspecies of deer

The Sangai (Meitei pronunciation: /sə.ŋai/) (scientific name: Rucervus eldii eldii) is an endemic and endangered subspecies of Eld's deer found only in Manipur, India. It is also the state animal of Manipur. Its common English name is Manipur brow-antlered deer or Eld's deer. Its original natural habitat is the floating marshy grasslands of the Keibul Lamjao National Park, located in the southern parts of the Loktak Lake, which is the largest freshwater lake in South Asia.

== Distribution and habitat ==
The brow-antlered deer or the dancing deer, is found in its natural habitat only at the Keibul Lamjao National Park over the floating biomass locally called phumdi in the southeastern part of Loktak Lake. It is located between 24°27' N and 24°31' N latitude and 93°53' E and 93°55' E longitudes. The park covers an area of 40 km and the home range of the deer in the park is confined to 15–20 km^{2}.

Phumdi is the most important and unique part of the habitat. It is the floating mass of vegetation formed by the accumulation of organic debris and biomass with soil. Its thickness varies from few centimeter to two meters. The humus of phumdi is black in color and very spongy with large number of pores. It floats with 4/5 part under water.

The number of deer listed in the Red Data Book was only 14 in 1975. After the declaration of the area as a national park and with strict conservation measures taken up by the Forest Department, the fear of its extinction has been greatly reduced.

== Biology and behavior ==
The brow-antlered deer is a medium-sized deer, with uniquely distinctive antlers, measuring 100–110 cm. in length with extremely long brow tine, which form the main beam. The two tines form a continuous curve at right angles to the closely set pedicels. This signifies its name, brow-antlered deer, the forward protruding beam appears to come out from the eyebrow. The antlers of the opposite sides are unsymmetrical with respect to each other. The beams are unbranched initially, whereas curvature increases as length increases, and they get forked also. The sexes are moderately dimorphic in body size and weight. The height and weight of a fully grown stag may be approximately 115–125 cm at shoulder and 95 to 110 kg (210 to 230 lb) respectively. The height and weight of the female are shorter and less as compared to the male counterpart. The length of the body from the base to the ear up to the tail is about 145 to 155 cm in both sexes. The tail is short and, rump the patch is not pronounced.

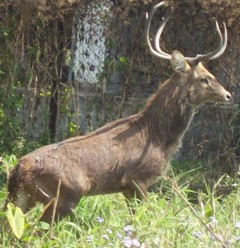
Sangai (Rucervus eldii eldii)

Sangai feed on a variety of water living plants, grasses, herbaceous plants, and shoots. Zizania latifolia, Tripidium bengalense, Erianthus procerus, Erianthus ravennae, etc. are the favorite food plants of sangai. Feeding behavior of sangai can be easily seen over new shoots on freshly cut fire line area. It exhibits a bimodal activity pattern. Sangai starts grazing usually early morning approximately 4:30 am, and generally continues up to 8:00 am. On a cloudy morning the period may extend to 10:00 am. In the evening it starts at 3:00 pm and continues up to 6:00 pm. After feeding it takes rest. During day time it rests under thick and tall reeds and grasses. At night some of them even rest on the hillocks.

The sangai has a maximum lifespan in the wild of around 10 years.

Rutting takes place in the early spring months between February and May. Males compete with each other to gain control of a harem of females that they can then mate with. After a 220-to 240-day-long gestation period, normally a single calf is born. The young are spotted at birth; these spots fade as the animal grows. The young are weaned at 7 months of age, and becomes sexually mature from 18 months of age onwards.

== Sangai in Meitei society ==
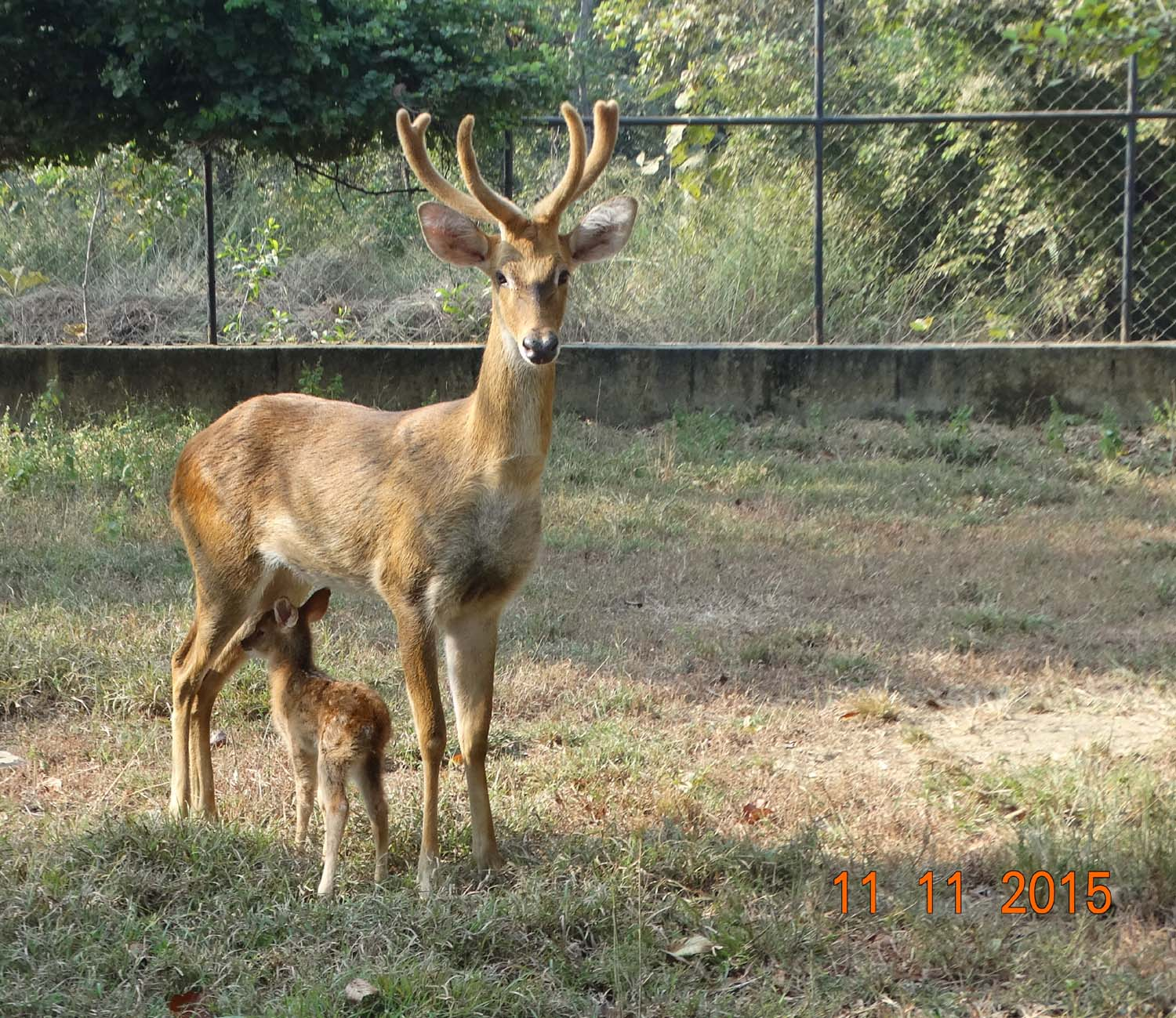
Sangai male with newborn fawn

Culturally, the sangai finds itself embedded deep into the legends and folklore of the Manipuris. Based on a popular folk legend, the sangai is interpreted as the binding soul between humans and the nature. The slaying of the sangai, an unpardonable sin, is conceived as the rude breaking up of the cordial relationship between humans and the nature. When humans love and respect the sangai, it is respecting nature. In the sangai, therefore, humans find a way of expressing their love for nature. Socially, the sangai is the symbol of a prized possession of the state.

It is believed that the name sangai (sa "animal" and ngai "in awaiting") was coined from its peculiar posture and behaviour while running. By nature, the deer, particularly the males, even when running for its life stops occasionally and looks back as if he is waiting for someone, and hence the name.

=== In Meitei folklore ===
According to a story in Meitei folklore (Manipuri folklore), a hero named Kadeng Thangjahanba of Moirang once captured a gravid sangai from Torbung Lamjao for a gift to his beloved ladylove named Tonu Laijinglembi during an animal hunting expedition. However, as fate would have it, he found his beloved married to the king of Moirang on his return. The heartbroken hero released the deer free in the wild of Keibul Lamjao. From that time onwards the place became the home of sangai.

In another story in Meitei folklore of Manipur, a prince named Pudangkoi of Luwang clan had, by the grace of a divine entity, transformed himself into a deer which has later on called sangai. Further, there were references of sangai head with crown of antlers, being decorated on the head of royal boat called Hiyang Hiren.

Identified as one of the rarest animal species in the area, it is revered as such for the people. Talk of Manipur, and one of the first things stated is the sangai, as opposed to polo, the Manipuri classical dance, local sports or films.

== Danger of extinction ==
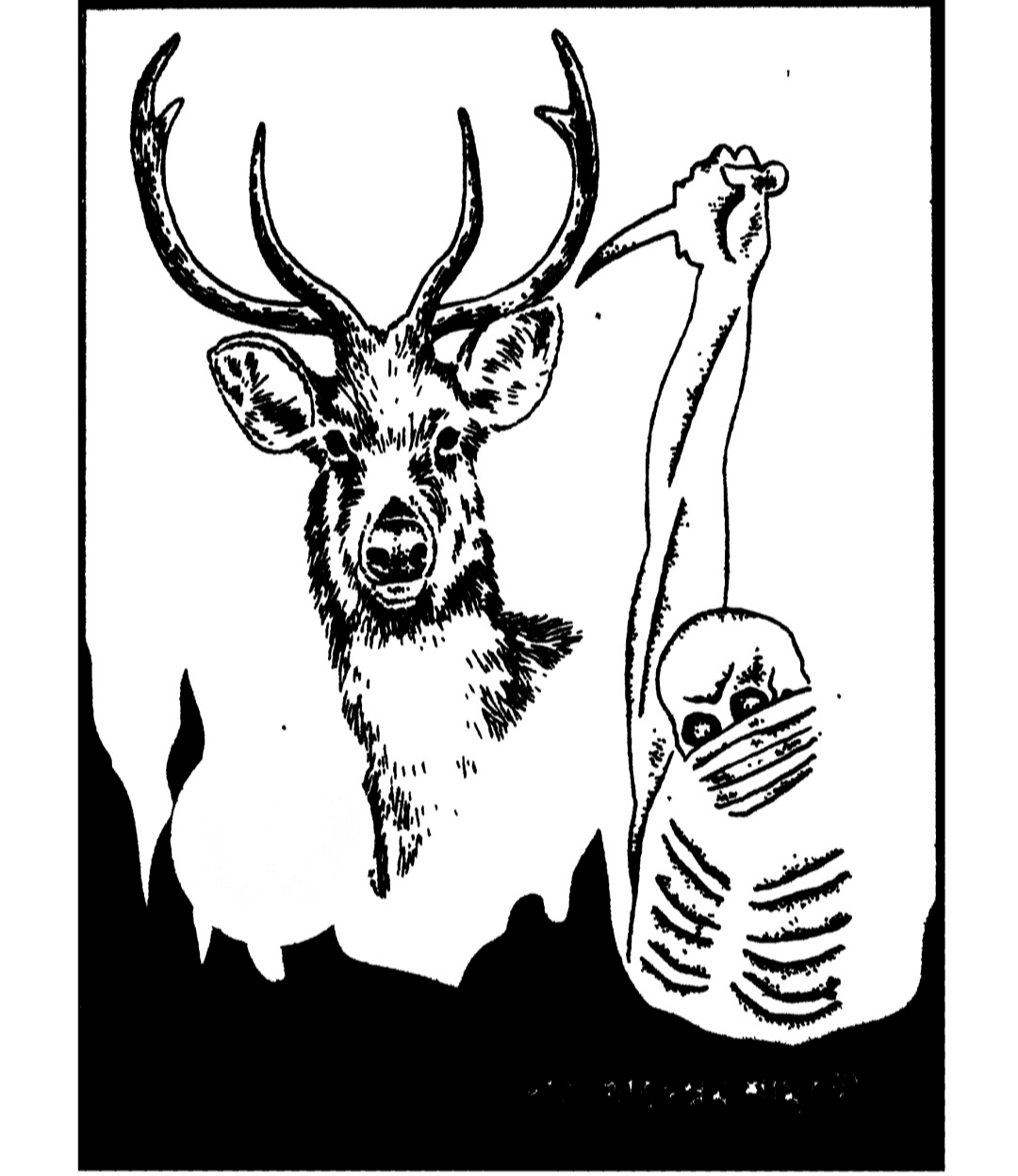
A Meitei popular cultural illustration of Sangai deer (Cervus eldi eldi) pleading to save him from being killed by human beings

The sangai was believed to be almost extinct by 1950. However, in 1953, six heads of the sangai were found hovering at its natural habitat. Since then, the State Government has taken serious and positive measures for the protection of this rare and endangered species. The number of endangered deer sangai found in Manipur has increased from 204 in 2013 to 260, according to the latest census conducted in March 2016, jointly by Wildlife Wing, Forest department, State government, Manipur University and Wildlife Institute of India.

The sangai faces a two-pronged danger to its life. Firstly, its habitat is steadily degenerating by reason of continuous inundation and flooding by high water caused as the result of artificial reservoir of the National Hydroelectric Power Corporation Loktak. Secondly, poachers are out there to trap and slay the deer at the slightest opportunity.

In 1983, the 103 megawatt capacity National Hydroelectric Power Corporation Loktak was commissioned with the objective of ensuring rapid development in the State. A maximum high water level of 168.5 meters (553 ft) above mean sea level (MSL) is maintained in the Loktak Lake to feed the reservoir for the hydel project. This high water level had wreaked havoc in the Keibul Lamjao National Park. The high water level, maintained continuously through the year, had disturbed the natural life cycle of the vegetation growth, the phumdi, upon which the sangai thrives. The deer feed on several types of vegetation that grow on the phumdi. The vegetation also provides shelter to the deer and other wildlife in the park.

The life cycle of the phumdi involves floating on the water surface during the season of high water, as in the monsoons. In the lean season, when the water level reduces, the biomass comes into contact with the lake bed, and they secure the required nutrient from there. When the rains come again and they become afloat, the biomass has enough 'food'—the nutrients—stored in their roots, and their life continues. What is happening now, according to local scientists who are studying the phenomenon, is that with continuous high water in the lake throughout the year, much of this process of 'feeding' on the nutrients in the lakebed has discontinued. The result: the biomass is losing weight and getting thinner by the year. Around January last week in 1999, it was reported that a large chunk of the biomass in the northern part of National Park had broken up into pieces and had drifted freely from the park area. This was a bad sign for the sangai habitat. It spelled out very clearly that the beginning of the end of the sangai habitat had begun. There are reports of local people cutting up the phumdi into sizable pieces and then towing away these with dugout canoe fors 'selling' to fish culture owners. This is another potential danger to the sangai habitat. It meant humans are now aiding the process of annihilating the habitat area, supplementing to the rapid degeneration of the habitat.

== Films ==
- The Return of Sangai is a documentary by George Thengummoottil about Keibul Lamjao National Park and Sangai
- Paari (2000 film) - a children's movie by Aribam Syam Sharma

== See also ==
- Keibul Lamjao National Park
- Eld's deer
