= Imphal River =

River in Manipur, India

Imphal River Turel Achouba
- Location within Manipur Location within India
- Etymology: Great River
- Native name: Imphal Turel (Meitei)

Physical characteristics
- Source: Nilakuthi, at the confluence of two rivers Leimakhong and Sekmai River
- Mouth
  - coordinates: 24.4297589°N 93.838581°E
- Discharge
  - location: Ithai, Waipokpi

Basin features
- Tributaries
  - left: Tuitha River
  - right: Kongba River, Iril River, Thoubal River

The Imphal River (Meitei: Imphal Turel), also known as the Turel Achouba, is a major river in Manipur state, northeastern India which originates from the northern side of Kangpokpi district. It is a tributary of the Manipur River, joining it in Thoubal district. It flows past Loktak Lake and the city of Imphal and joins the Lilong River, some 10 kilometres (6.2 mi) to the south. It flows towards Myanmar (Burma), marking the end point at 23°59'49.2"N 93°44'29.7"E. In Myanmar, it flows south, meeting Myittha River at 22°53'24.19"N, 94° 5'1.79"E. Myittha river flows towards north and meets Chindwin River (also called Ningthi River) at 23°11'36.82"N, 94°18'38.28"E. Chindwin river then meets Irrawaddy River at 21°25'23.85"N, 95°16'47.56"E. Irrawaddy river then flows south till it reaches the Andaman Sea, adjoining the Bay of Bengal and thereby connecting Imphal city to the sea. Imphal River was used by Japanese soldiers in boats to reach Imphal in World War II.
