= List of museums in Madhya Pradesh =

This is a list of museums in Madhya Pradesh state in central India.

Museum Name	City	Type	Notes
Bharat Bhavan	Bhopal	Art	Modern art gallery; Auditoriums; ceramics workshop; digital art workshop
Indira Gandhi Rashtriya Manav Sangrahalaya (Museum of Mankind)	Bhopal	Anthropology	Traditional houses from different geographical locations and landscapes of India - Himalayan, desert, coastal, North-east indian (Nagaland huts are popular)
Tribal Museum Bhopal	Bhopal	Art	art and craft exhibits of tribes of Madhya Pradesh
State Museum	Bhopal	History	Contains very rare artefacts, like Panchmukhi Ganesha, 84 Jain bronze icons from Dhar, etc.
Regional Science Centre, Bhopal	Bhopal	Science	Located about 1 kilometer from Museum of Mankind (Manav Sangrahalaya)
Regional Museum of Natural History	Bhopal	History	Natural history of Central India; fossils; replicas of dinosaurs.
Remember Bhopal Museum	Bhopal	Industrial disaster	Commemorates the 1984 Bhopal Gas Tragedy
Golghar Museum	Bhopal	History	It showcases a variety of arts, handicraft and social life from the Nawab-era princely state of Bhopal
Birla Museum	Bhopal	History	Located in the Birla Mandir complex.
Vidisha Museum	Vidisha	History	archaeological collection of Vidisha district
Sanchi Archaeological Museum	Sanchi	History	archaeological collection of Sanchi region; remains of stupas, Ashoka's pillars, etc.
Maharaja Chhatrasal Museum	Dhubela, near Chhatarpur	History	
Rani Durgawati Museum	Jabalpur	History	
Central Museum	Indore	History	

== See also ==
- List of museums in India
