= Vidisha Museum =

Vidisha District Museum
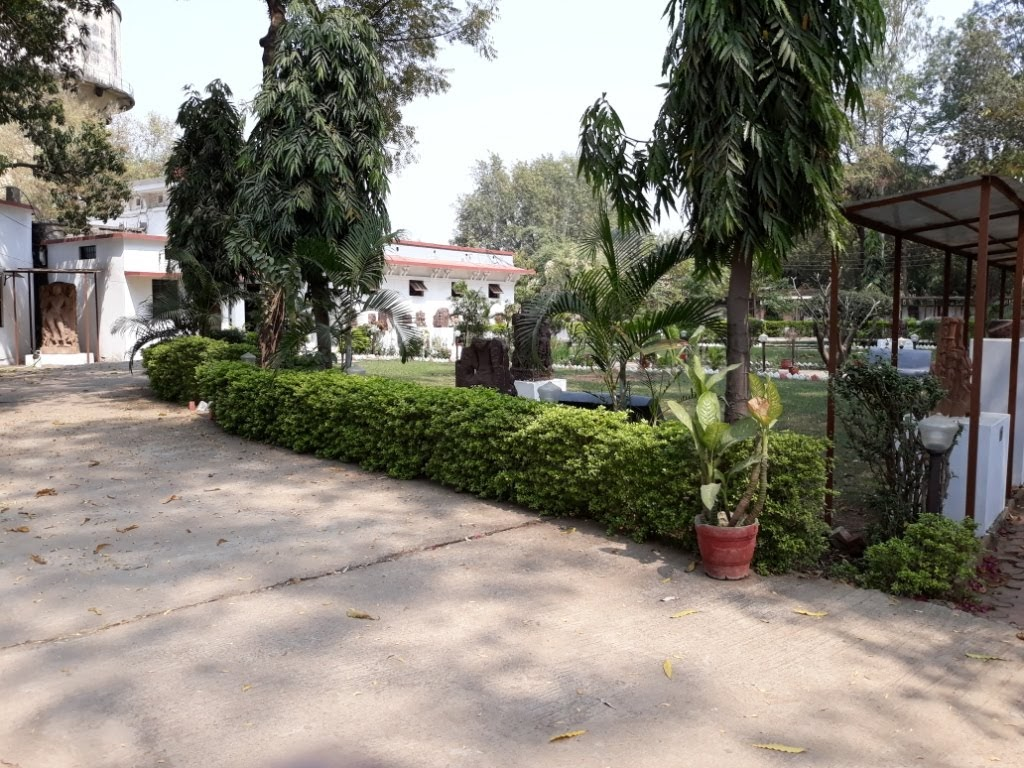
- Vidisha District Museum

- Location within India
- Location: Vidisha
- Coordinates: 23.519738°N 77.816497°E
- Type: Archaeological museum
- Collection size: Jain, Buddhist and Hindu art, sculpture, antiquities

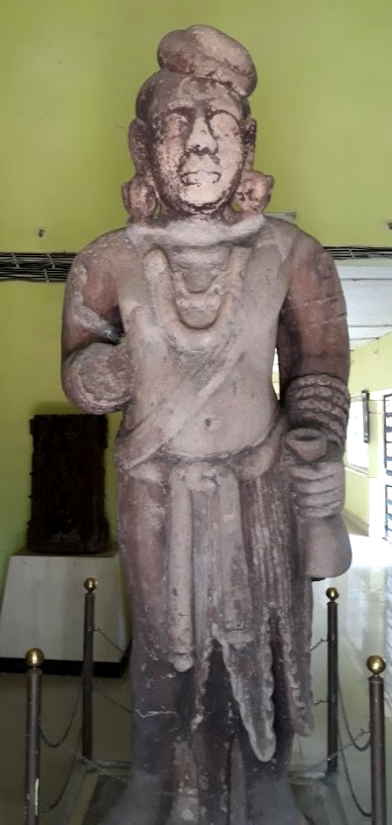
Vidisha Yaksha, 2nd century BCE.

Vidisha Museum or Vidisha District Museum is the main museum of the city of Vidisha, ancient Besnagar.

The museum has many sculptures, terracottas and coins, especially from the 9th to the 10 th century CE, as well as Harappan art.

A statue of a Yaksha, usually dated to the time of the Mauryan Empire or the Sunga Empire, can be seen.

== Gallery ==
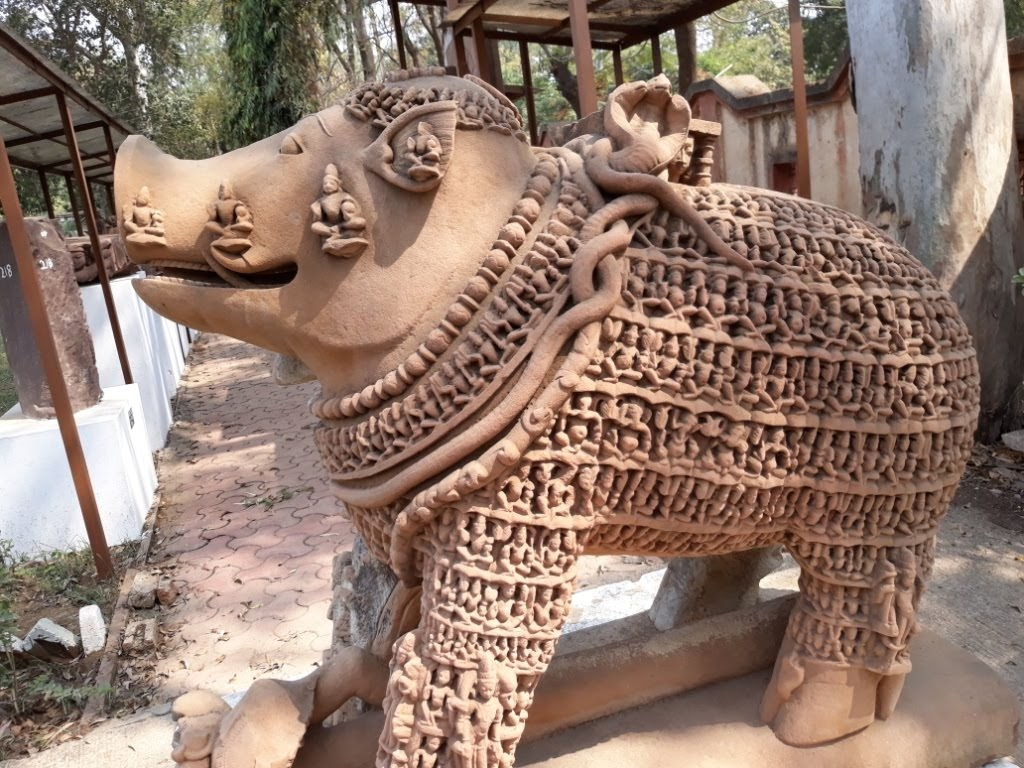
Boar (side)

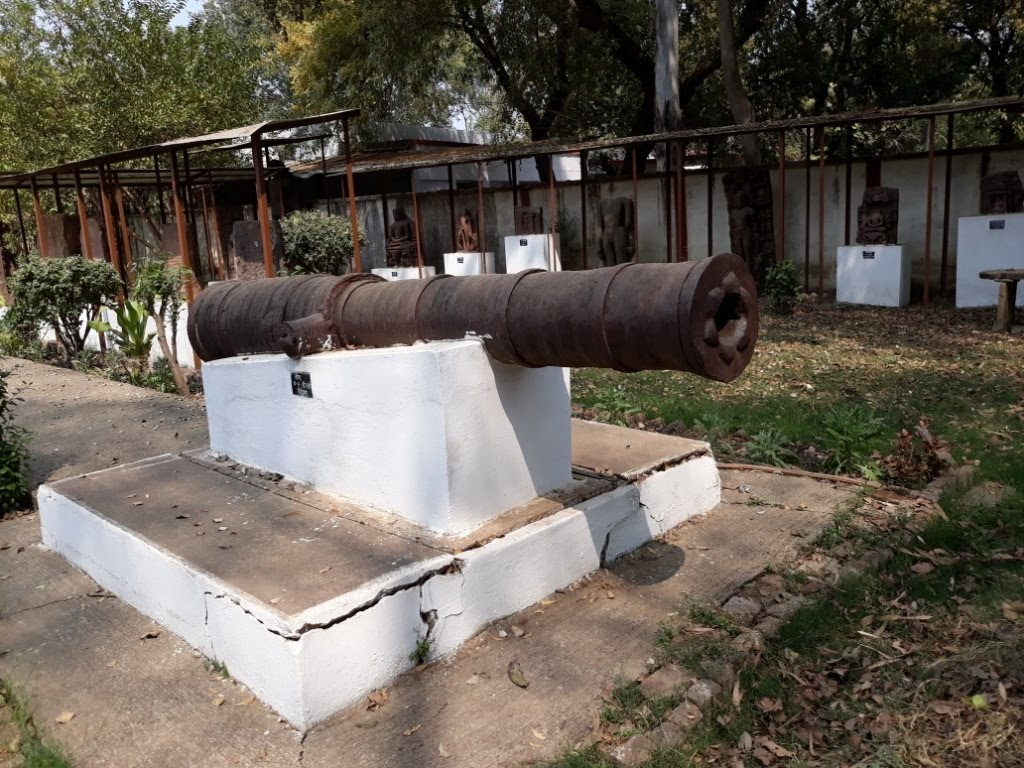
Canon.

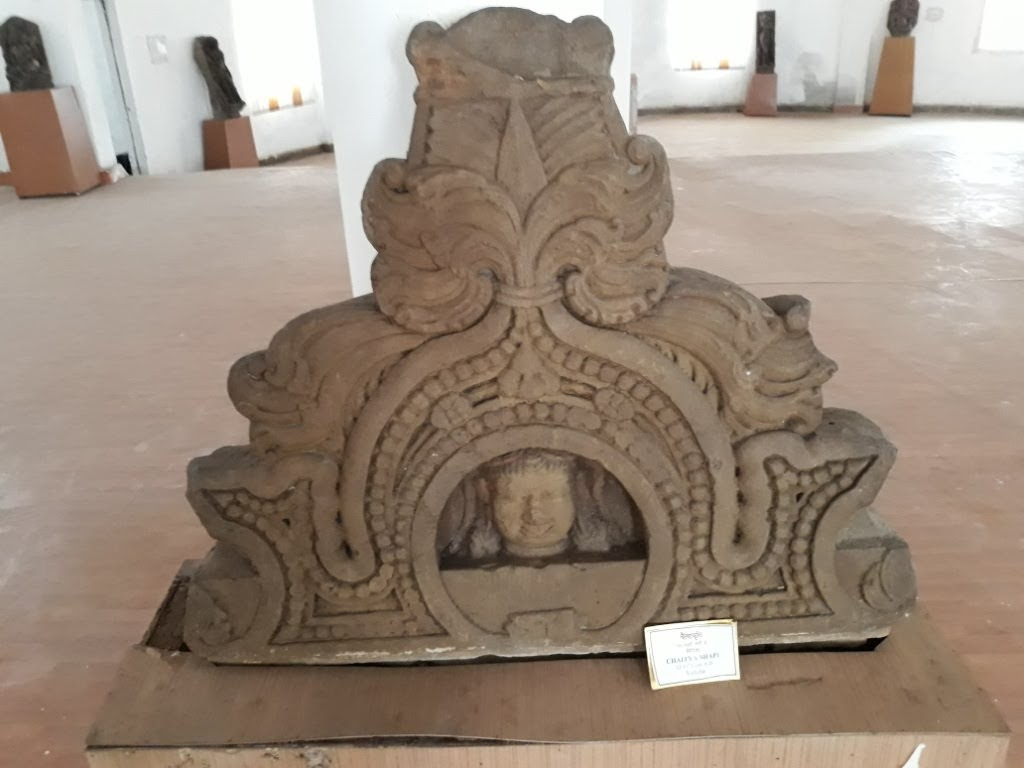
Chaitya.

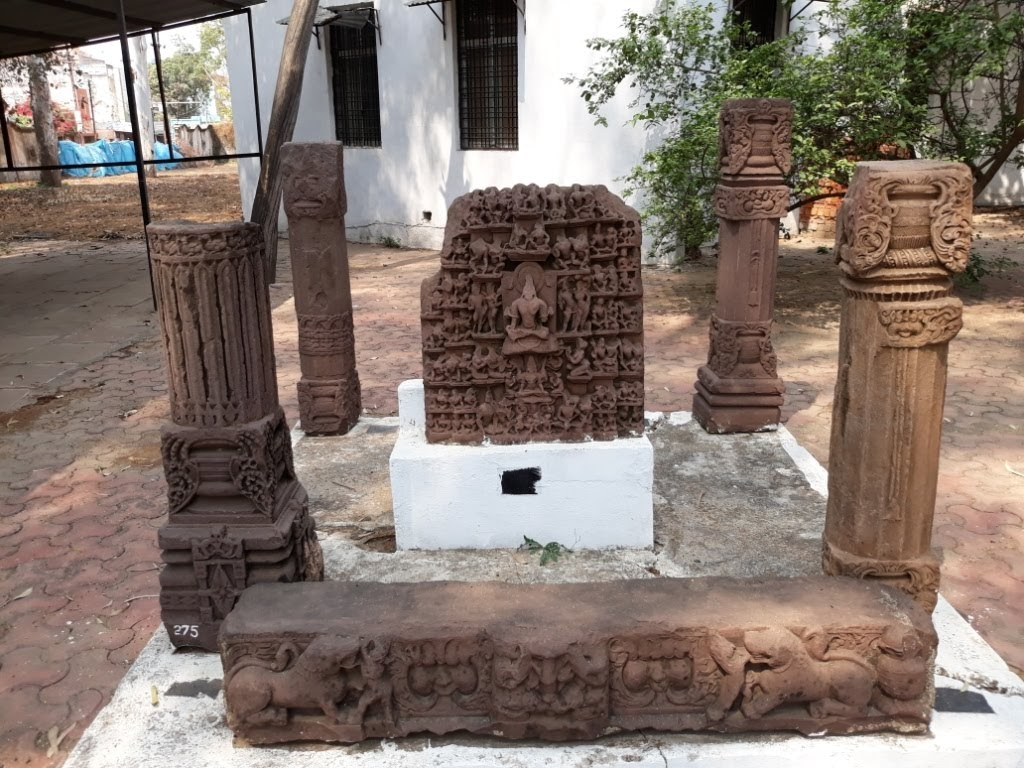
Decorated pillars.

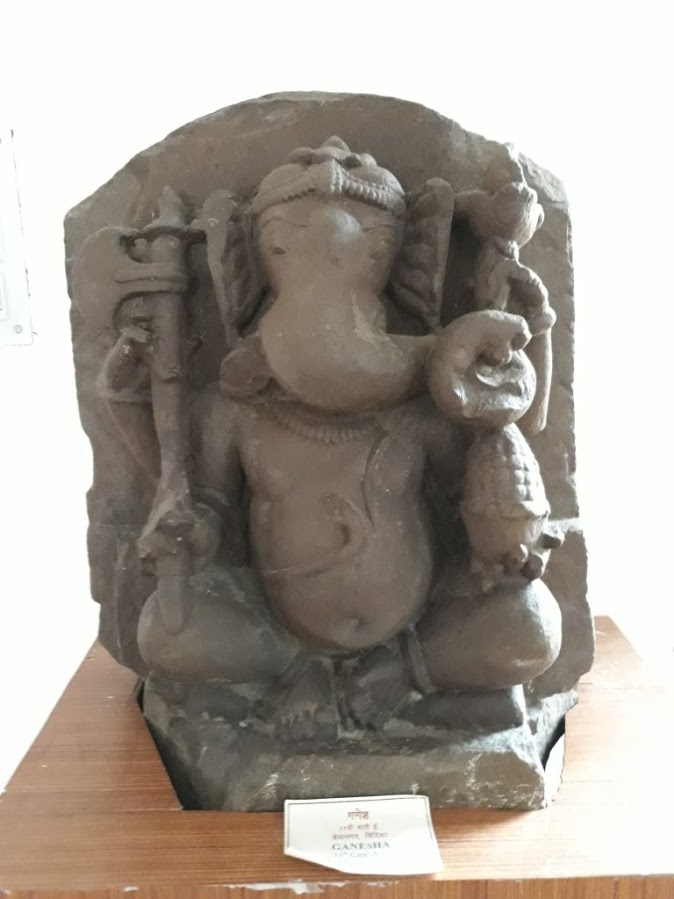
Ganesha.

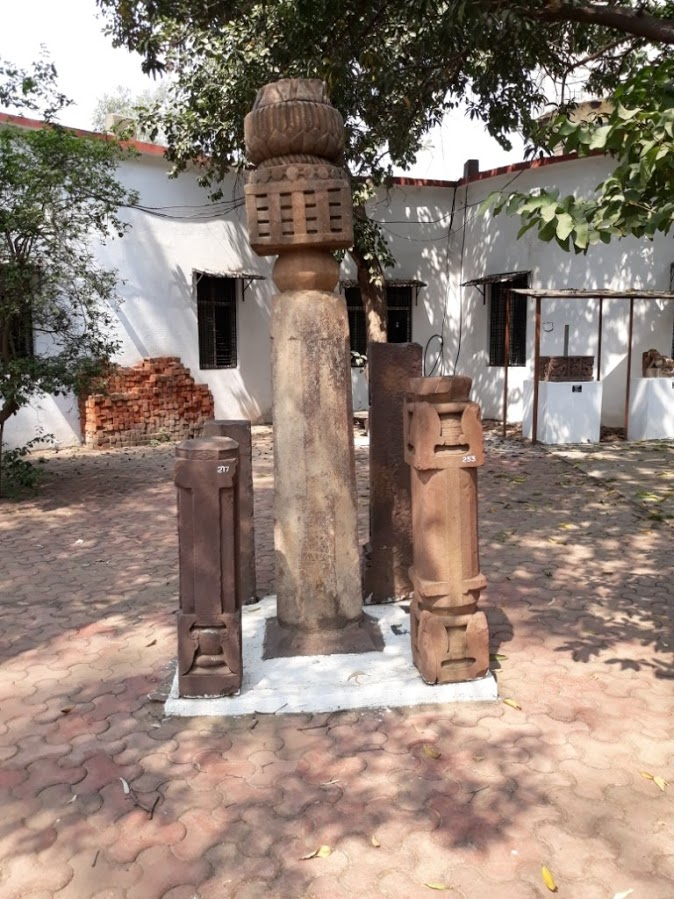
Pillars.

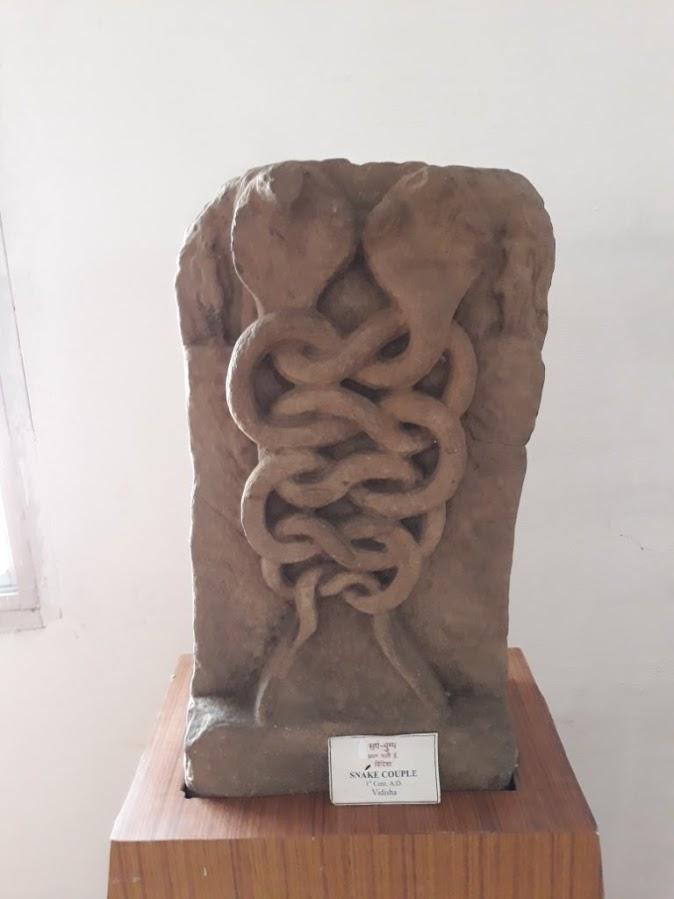
Snake Couple.

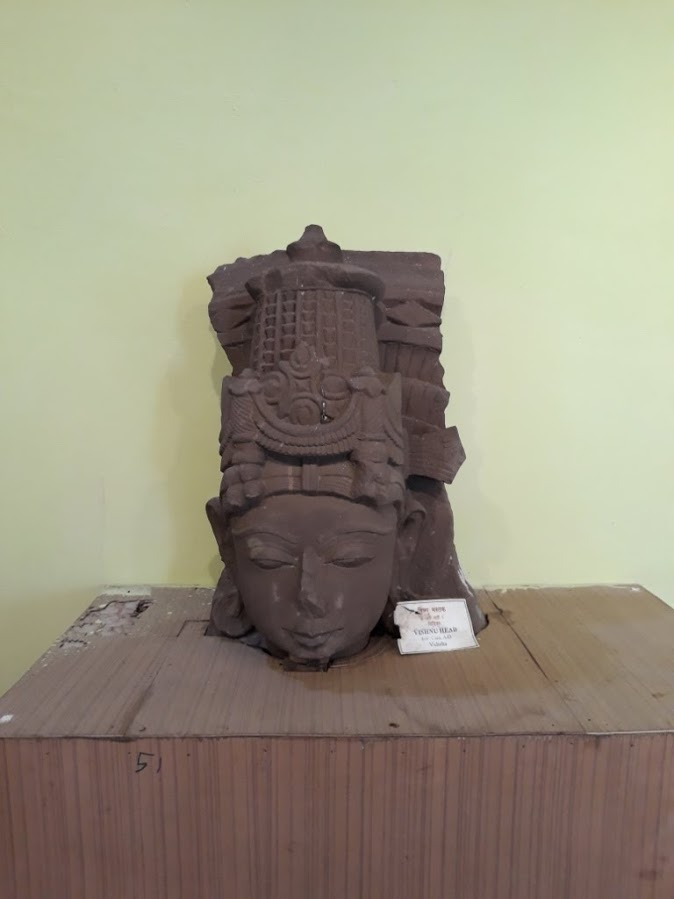
Bust.

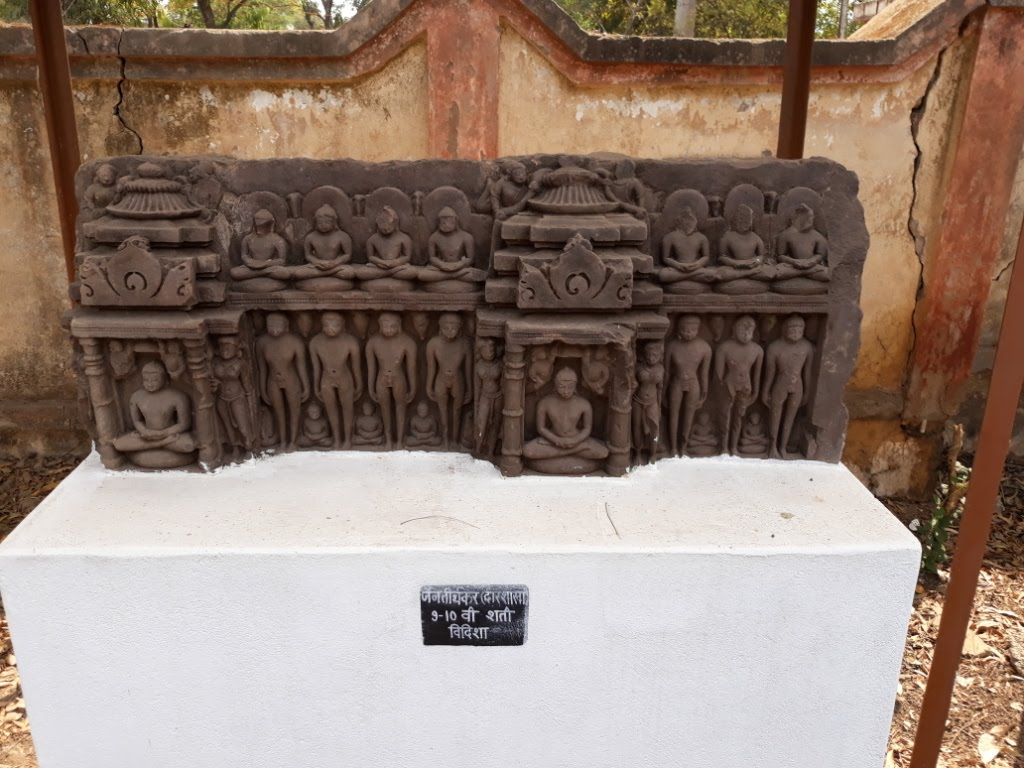
Tirthankar anel, 9th century

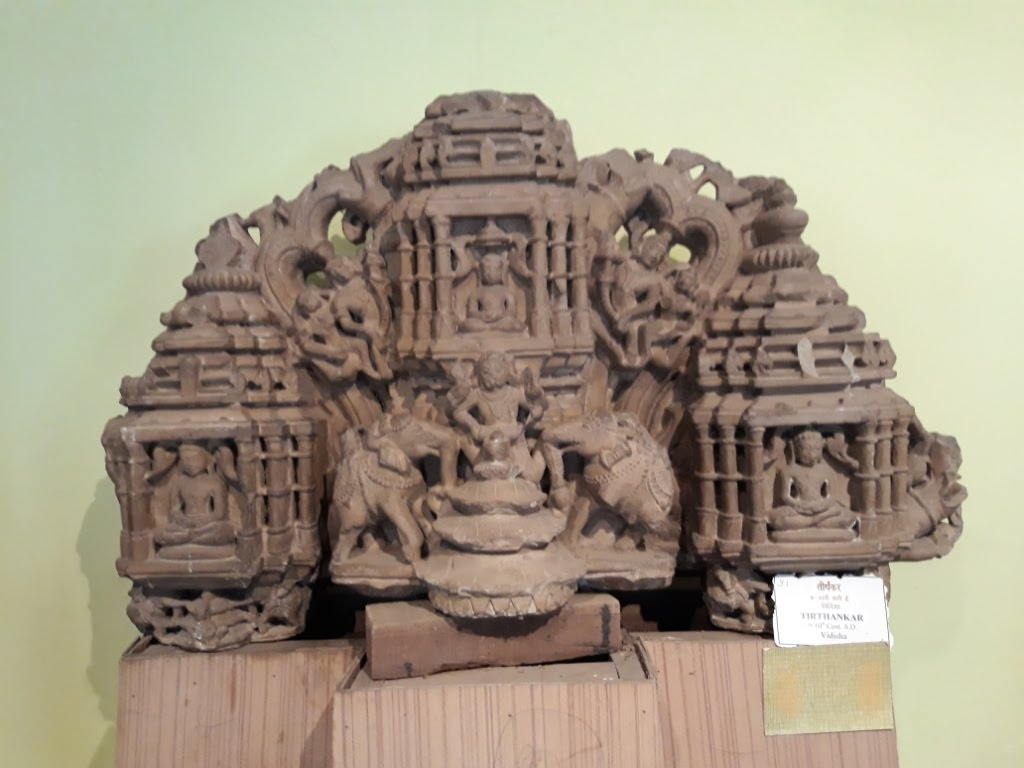
Tirthankar arch, 9th century

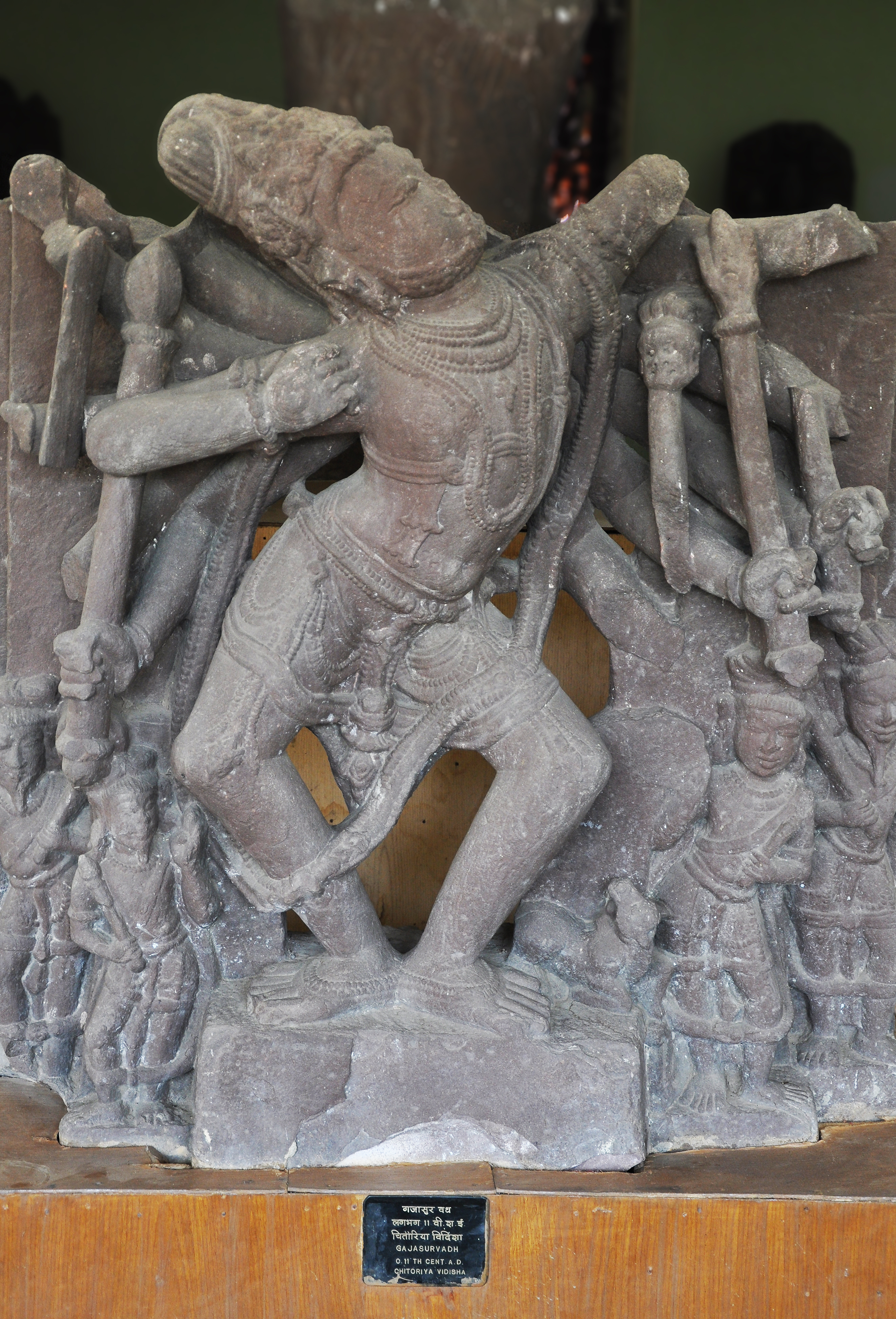
GajaSur Vadh

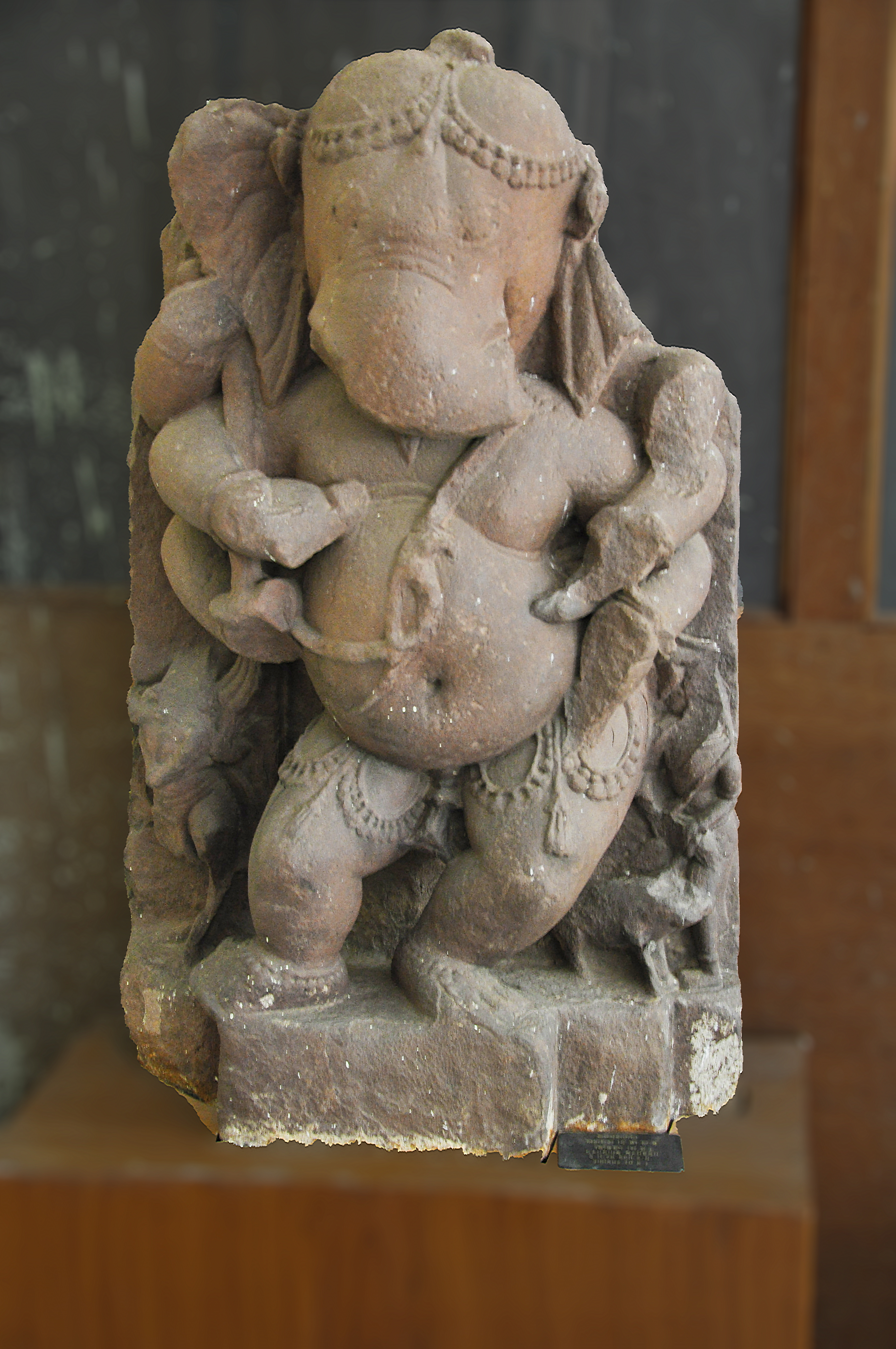
Nritya Ganapati

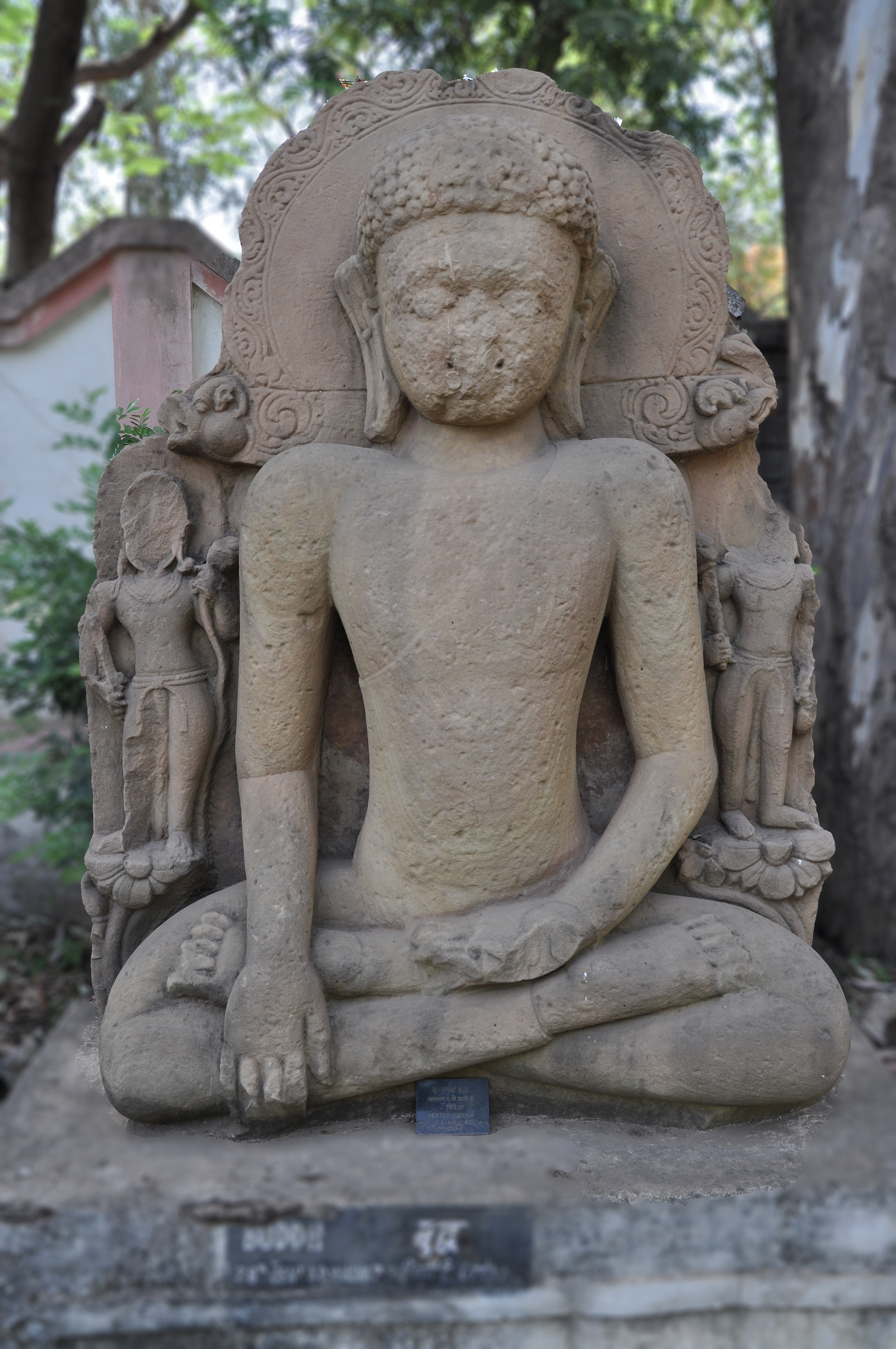
Bhu Sparsh Buddha

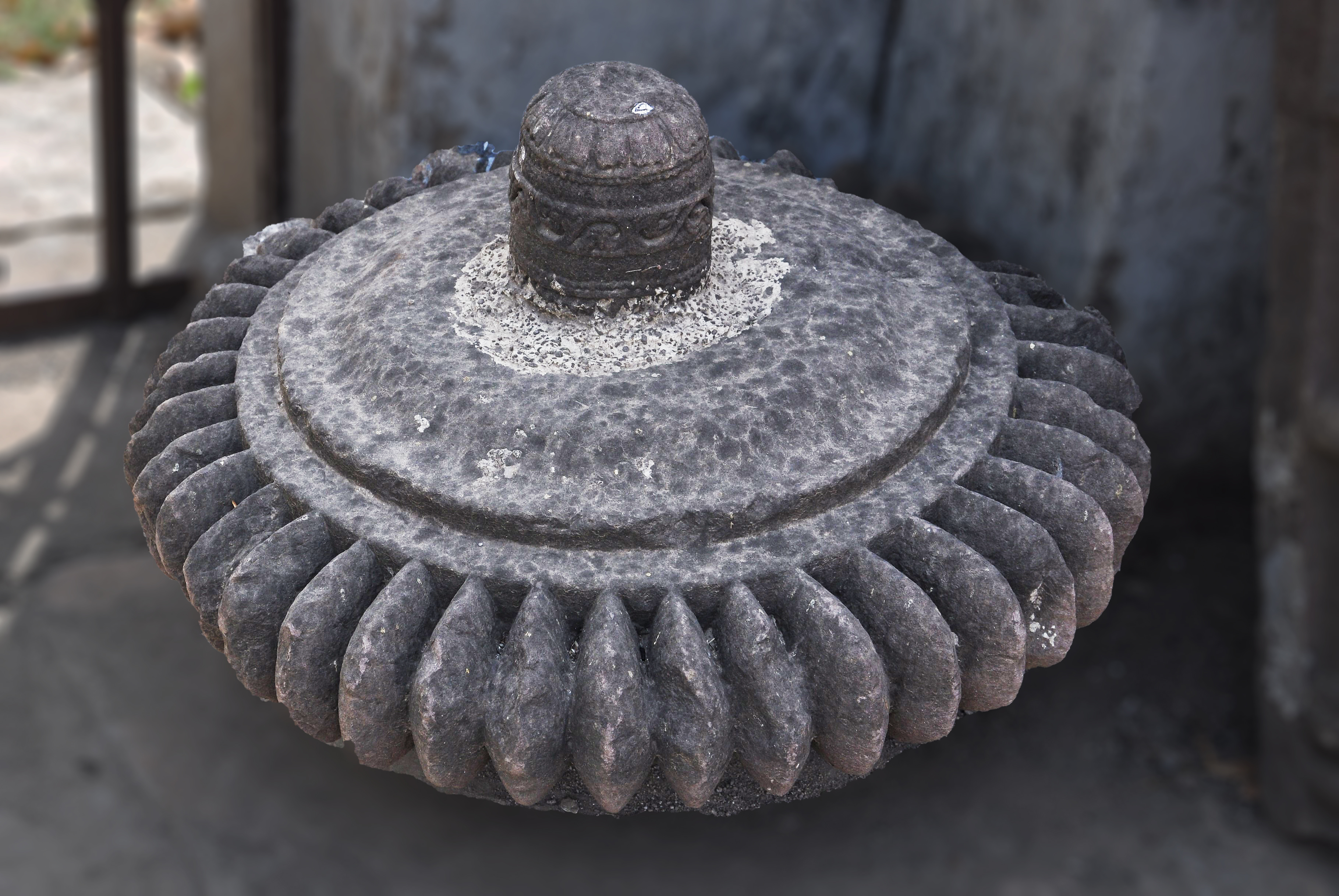
Amlaka - Architectural Element

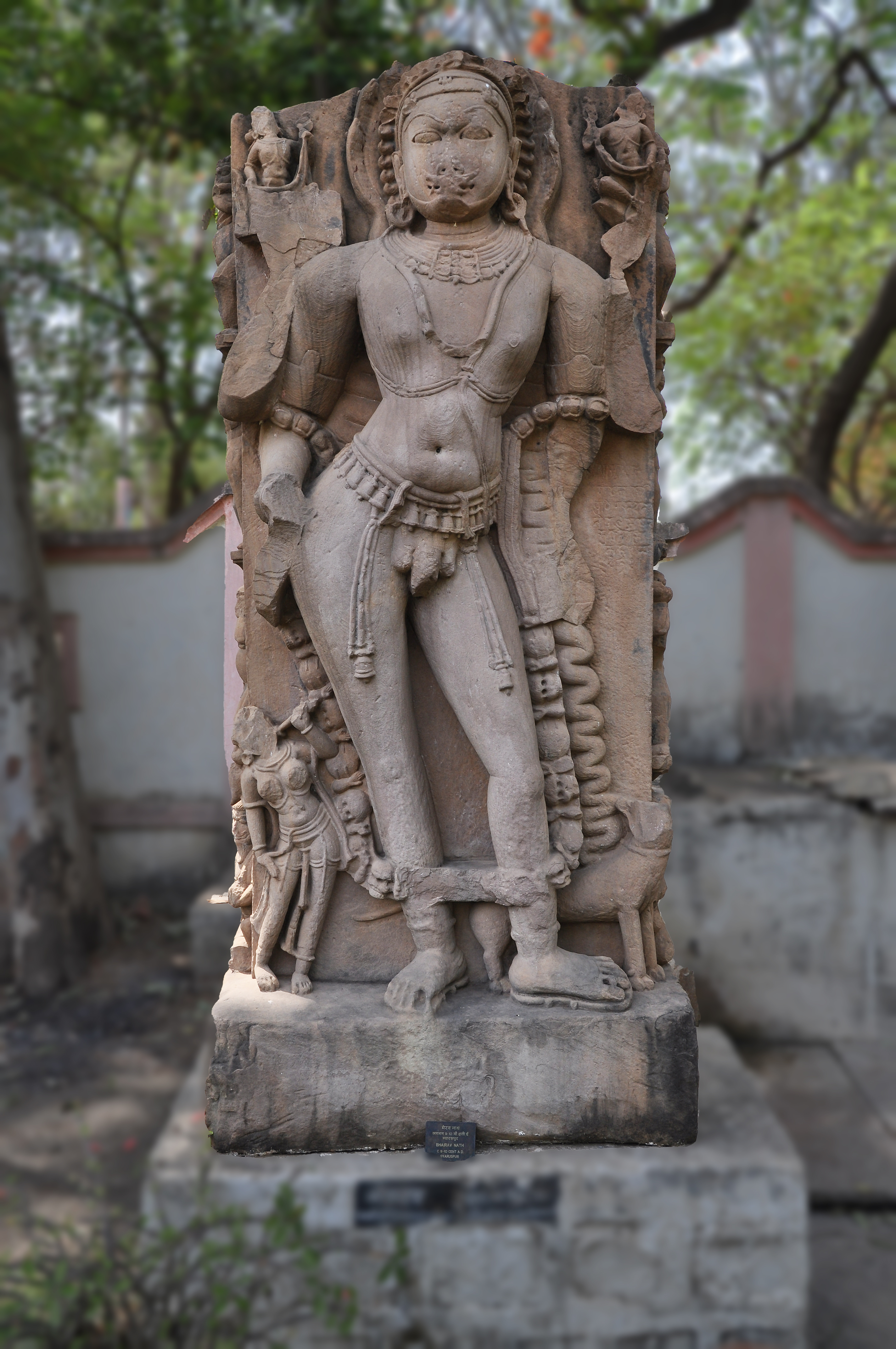
Bhairavnath

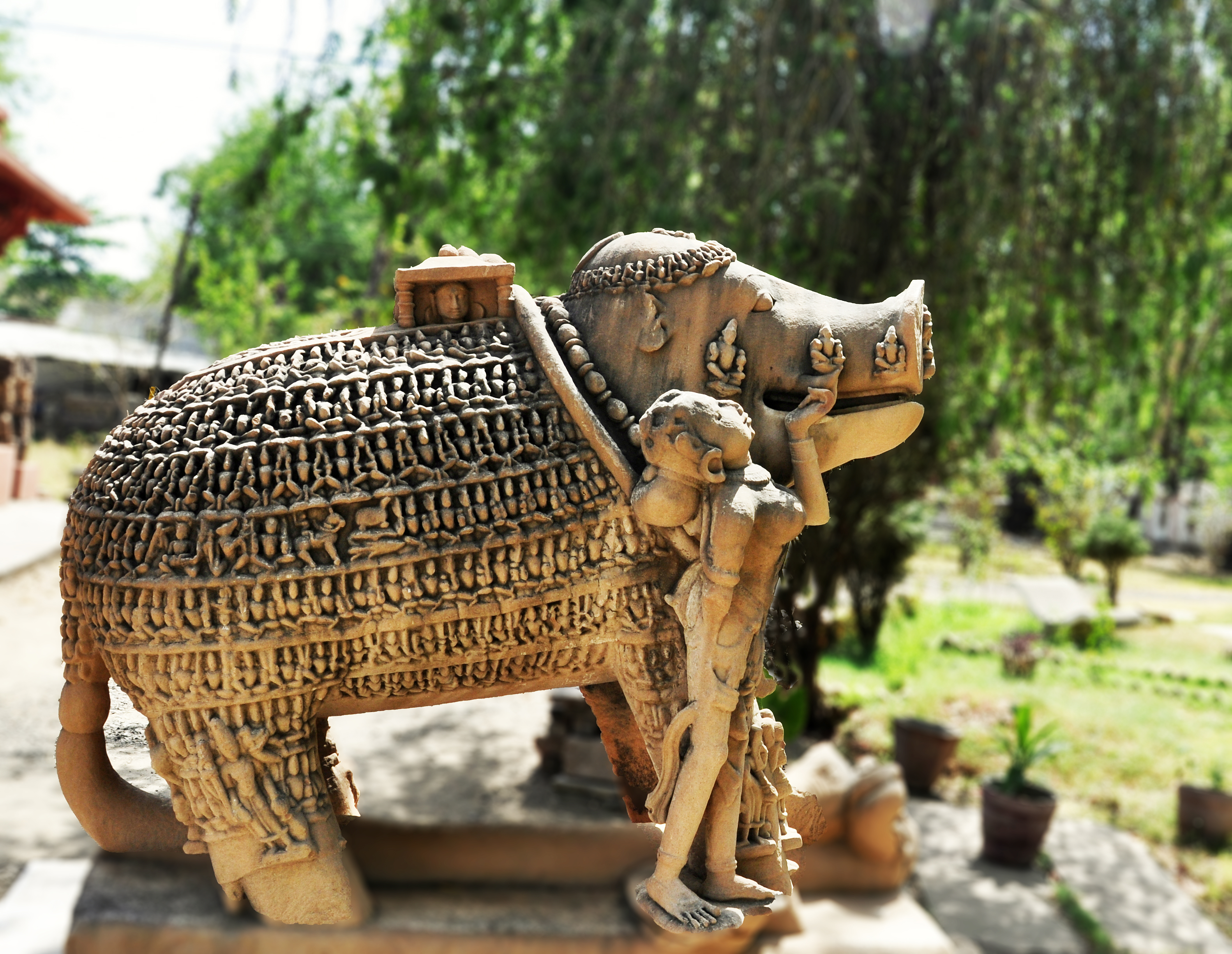
Yajna Varaha

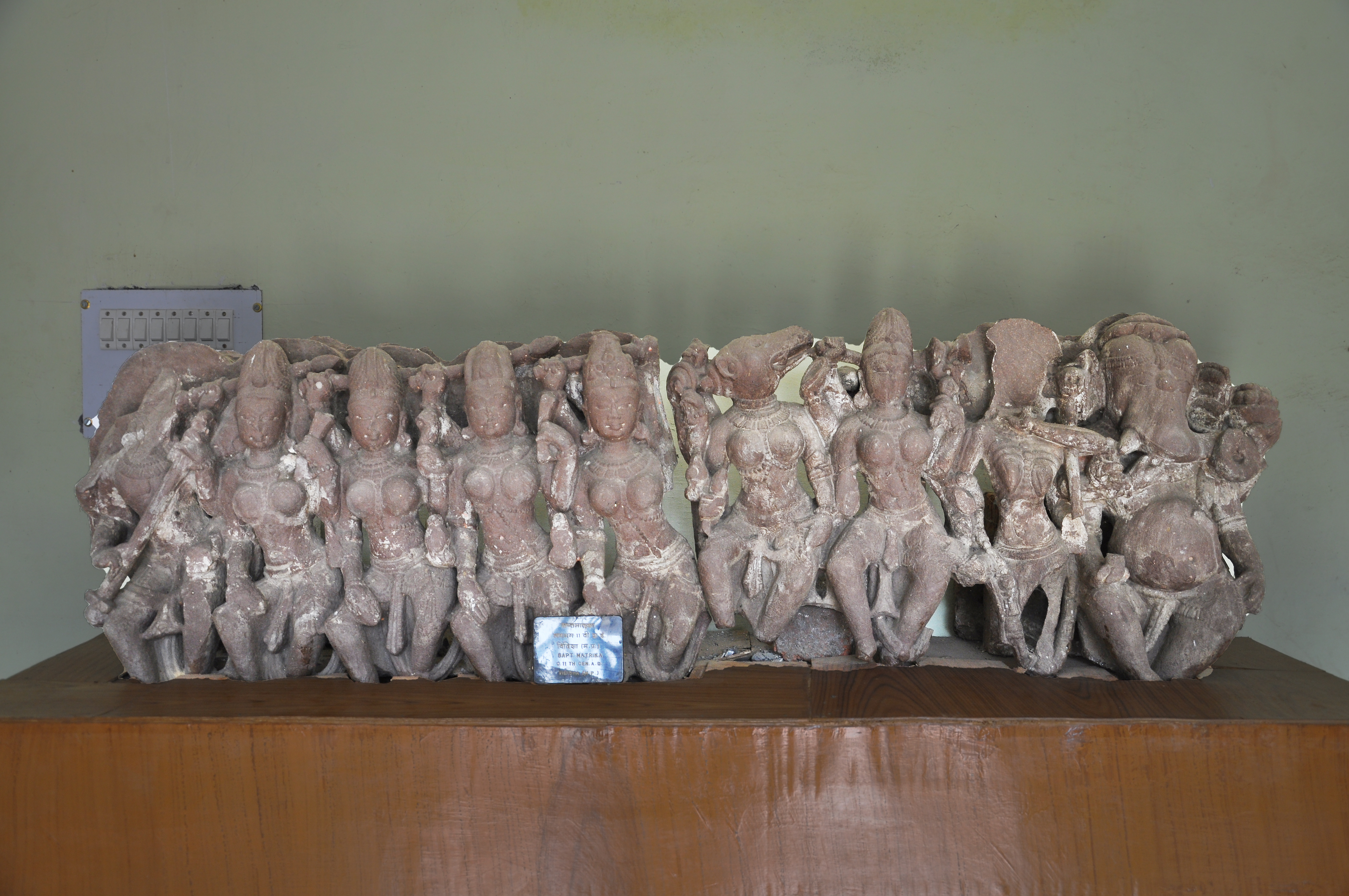
Saptamatrikas

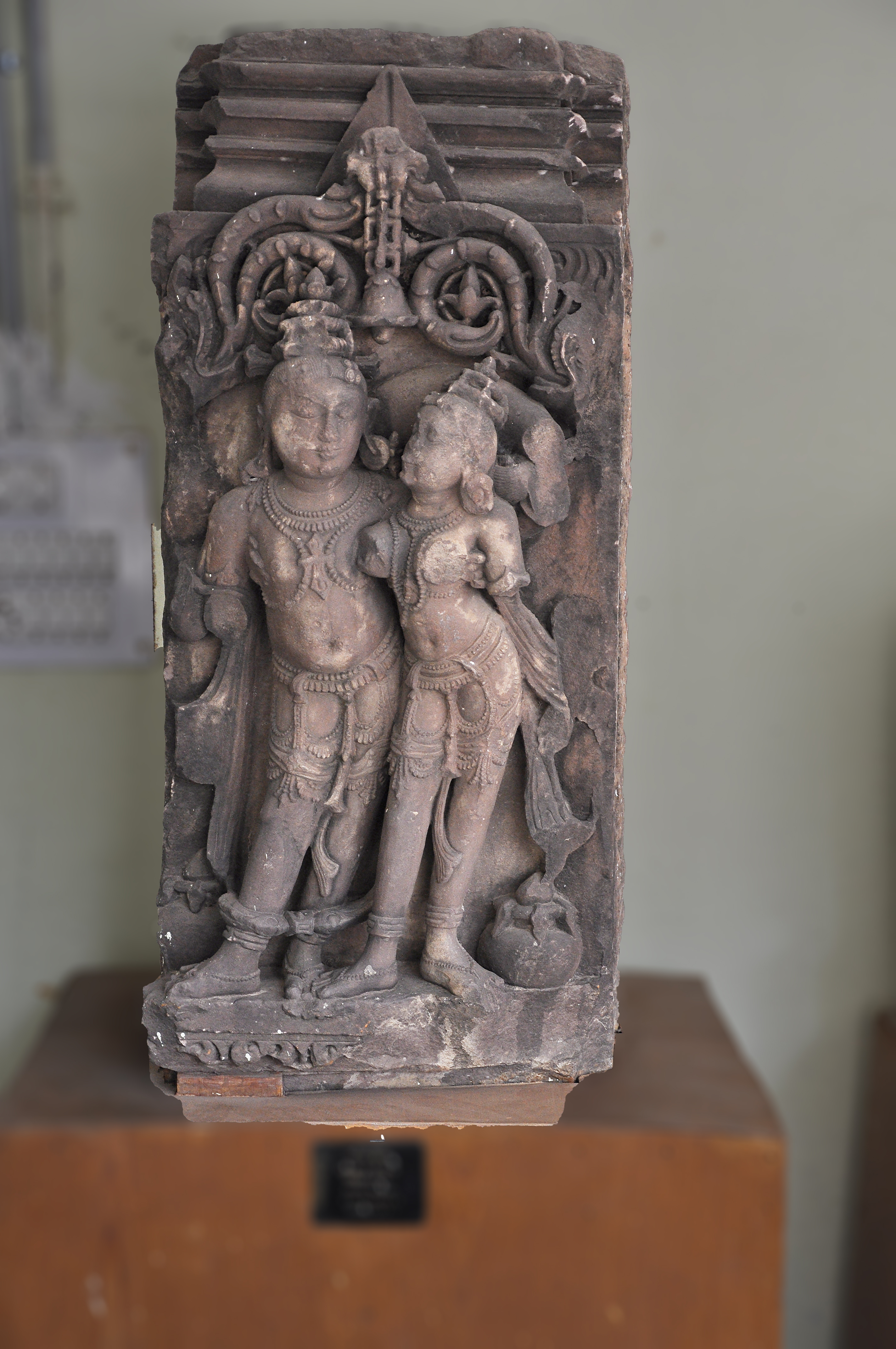
Riddhi Kubera

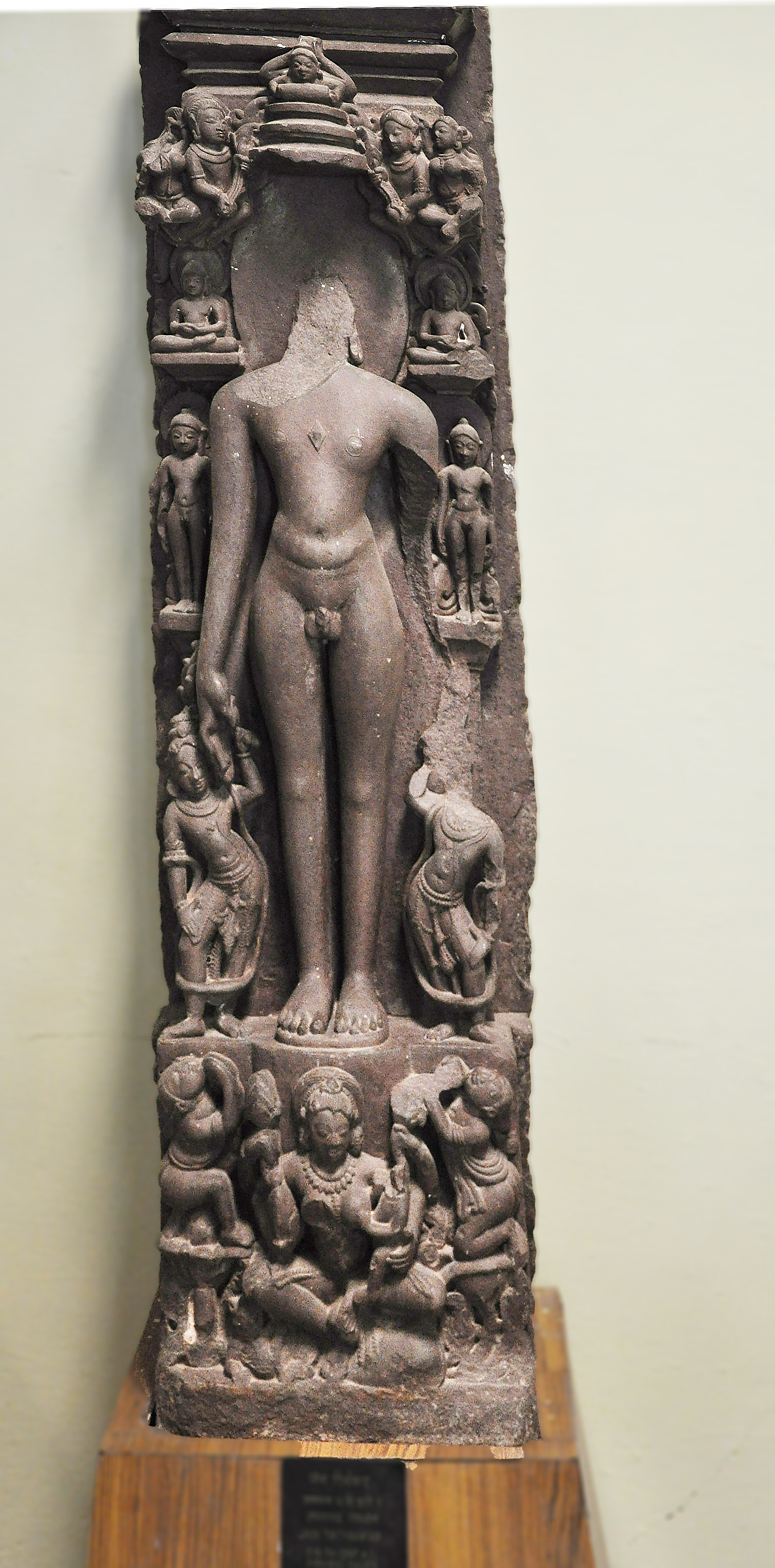
Parasnath Tirthankara

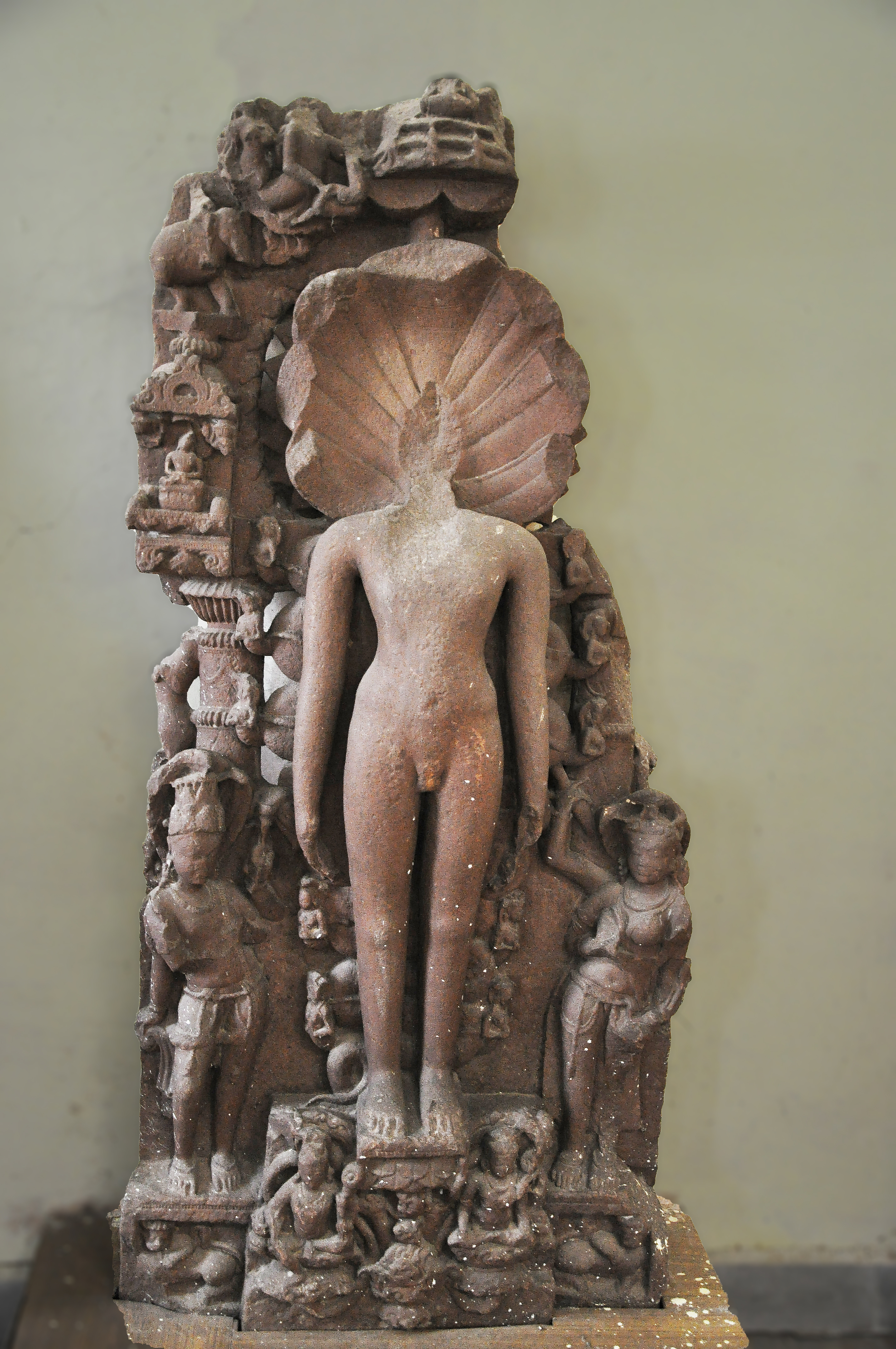
Parasnath Tirthankara

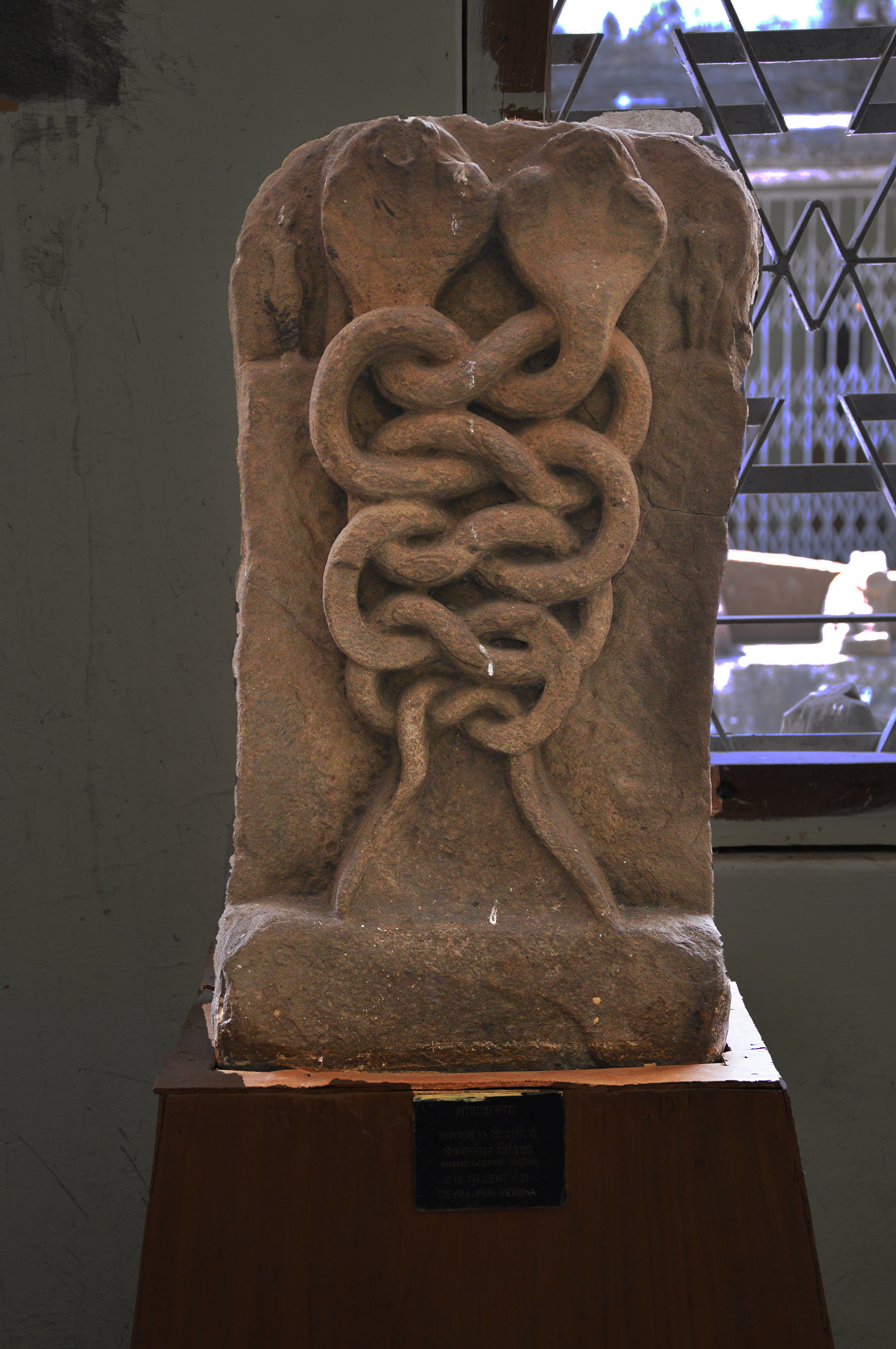
Naga Kaya

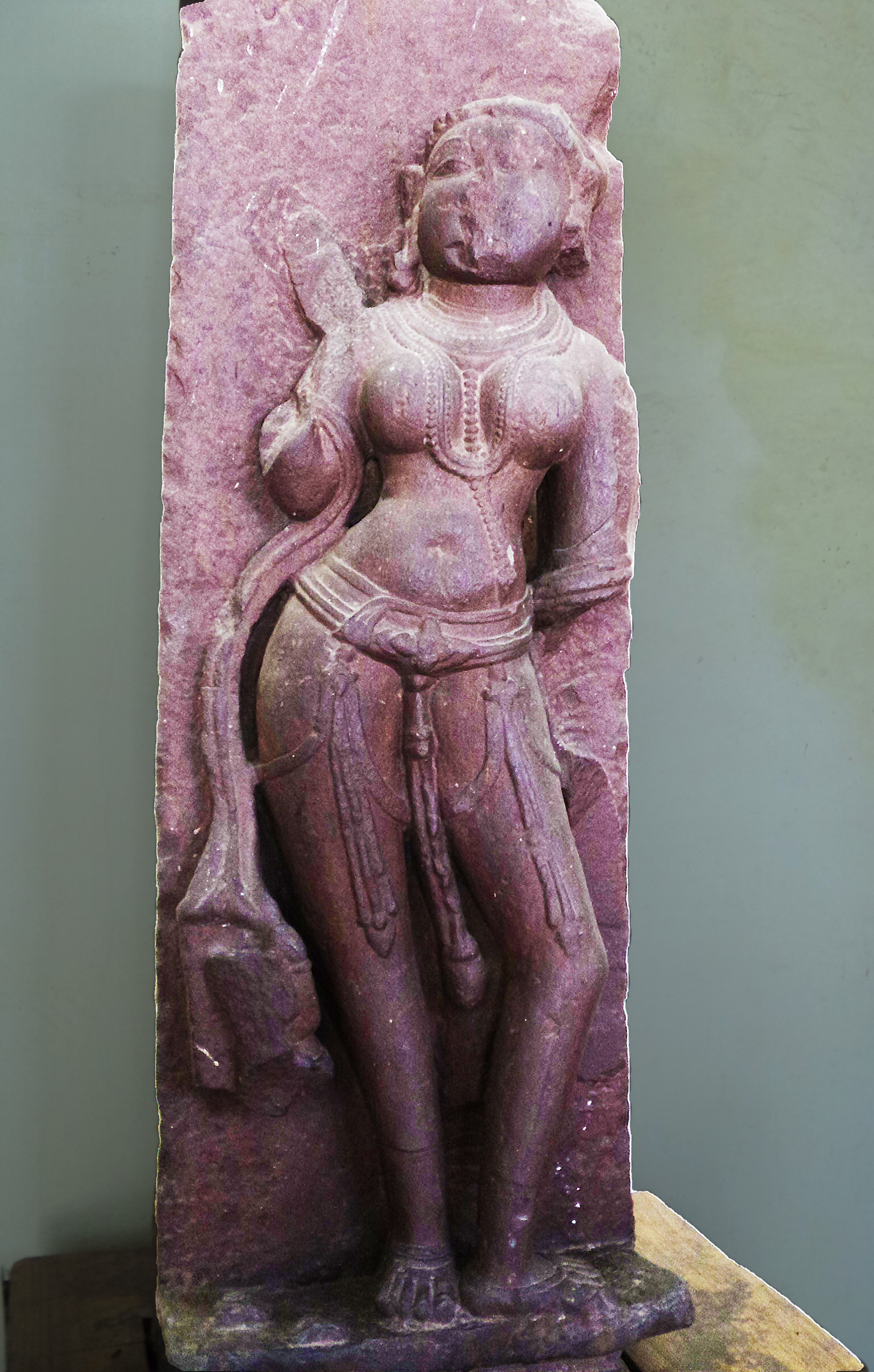
Nayika

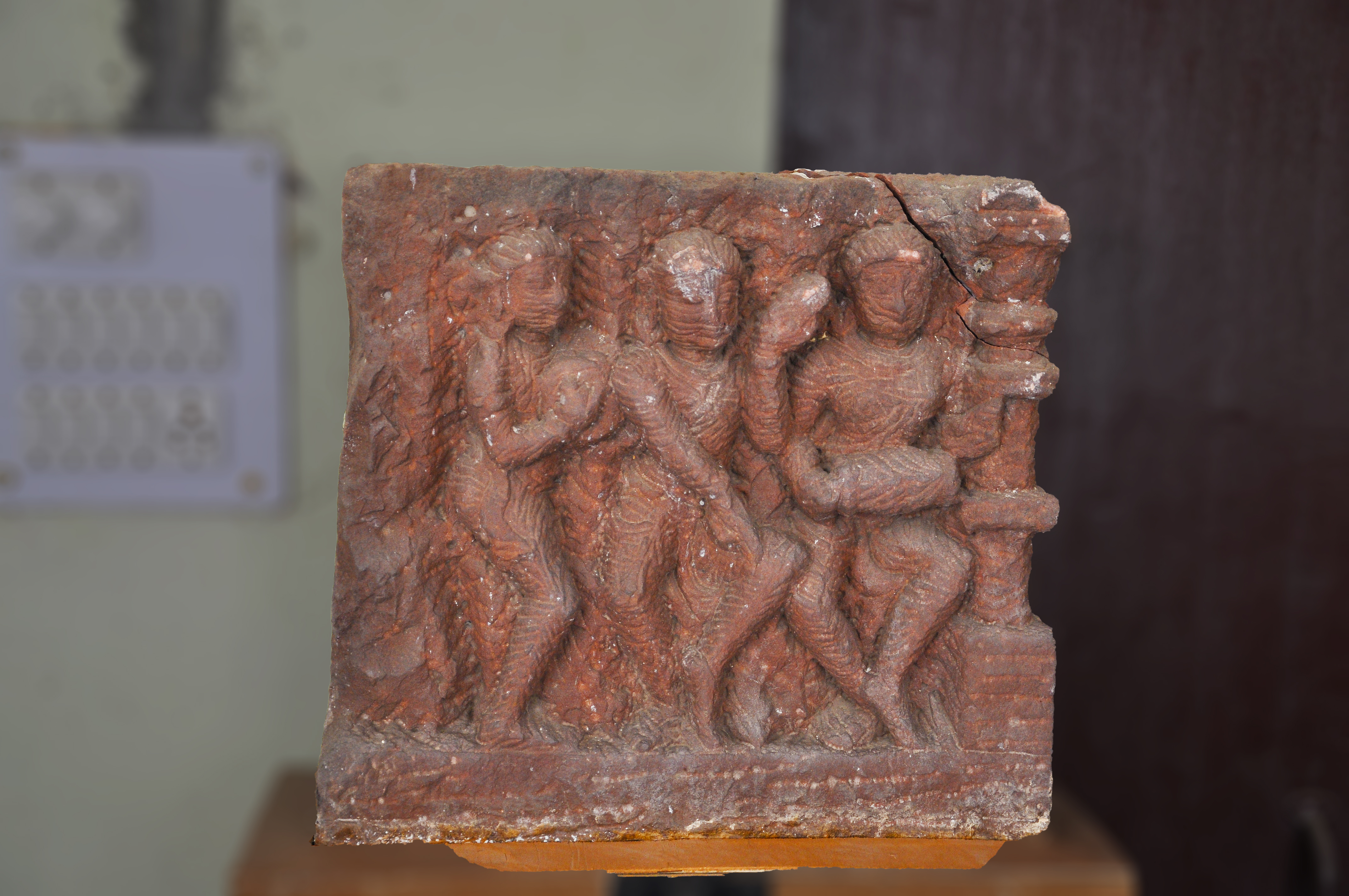
Nartakas - Dancers

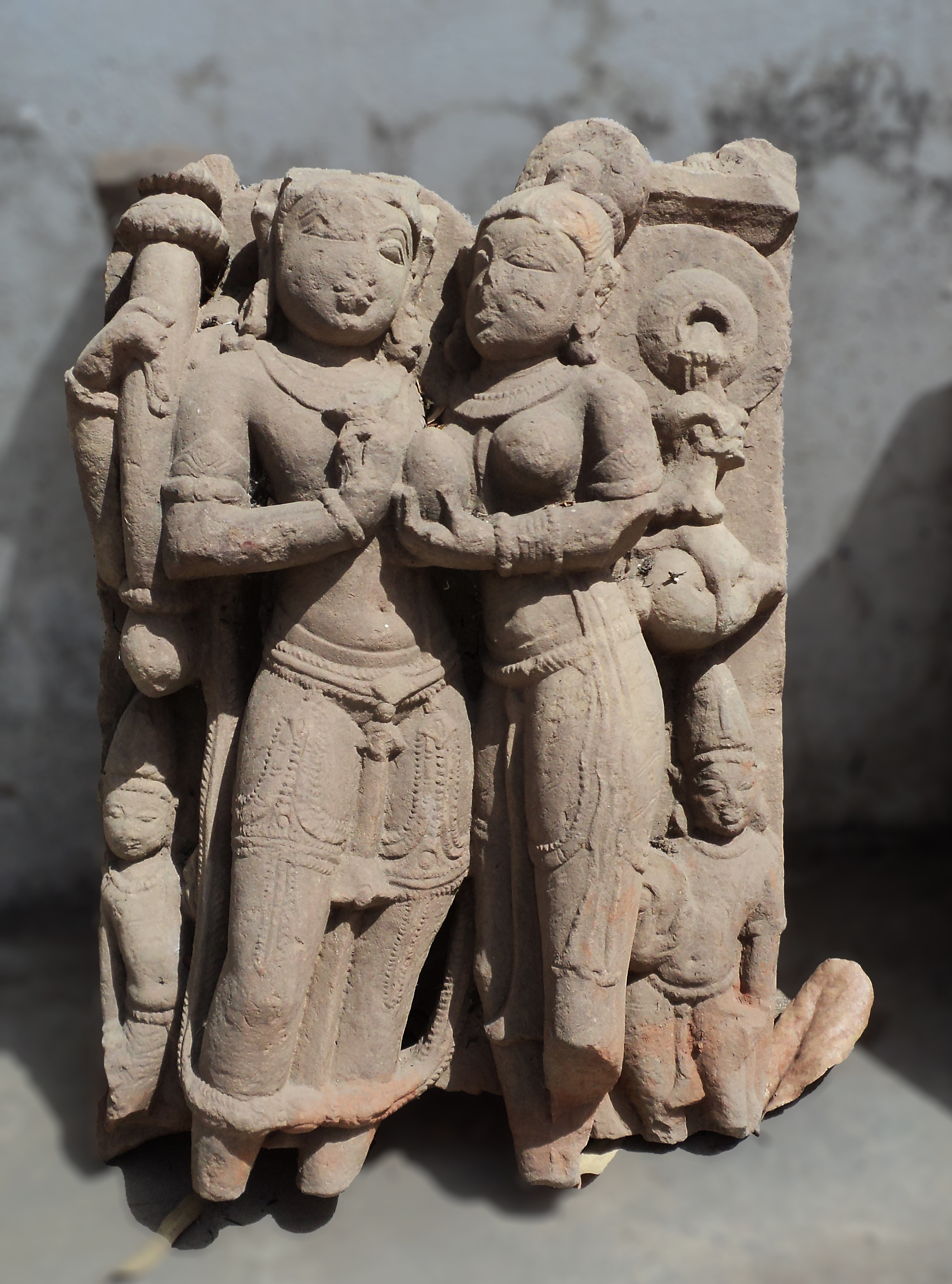
Mithuna

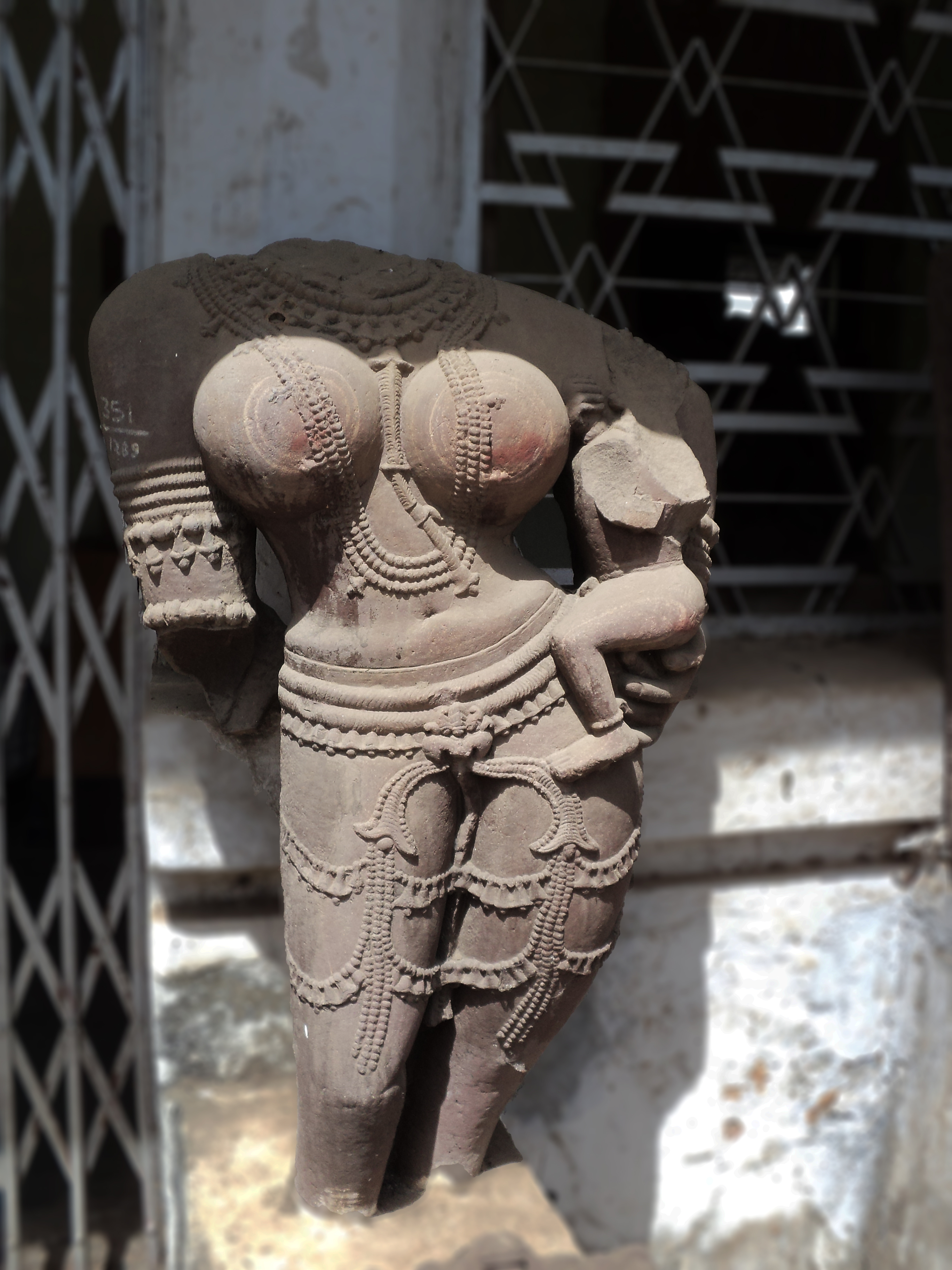
Matrika

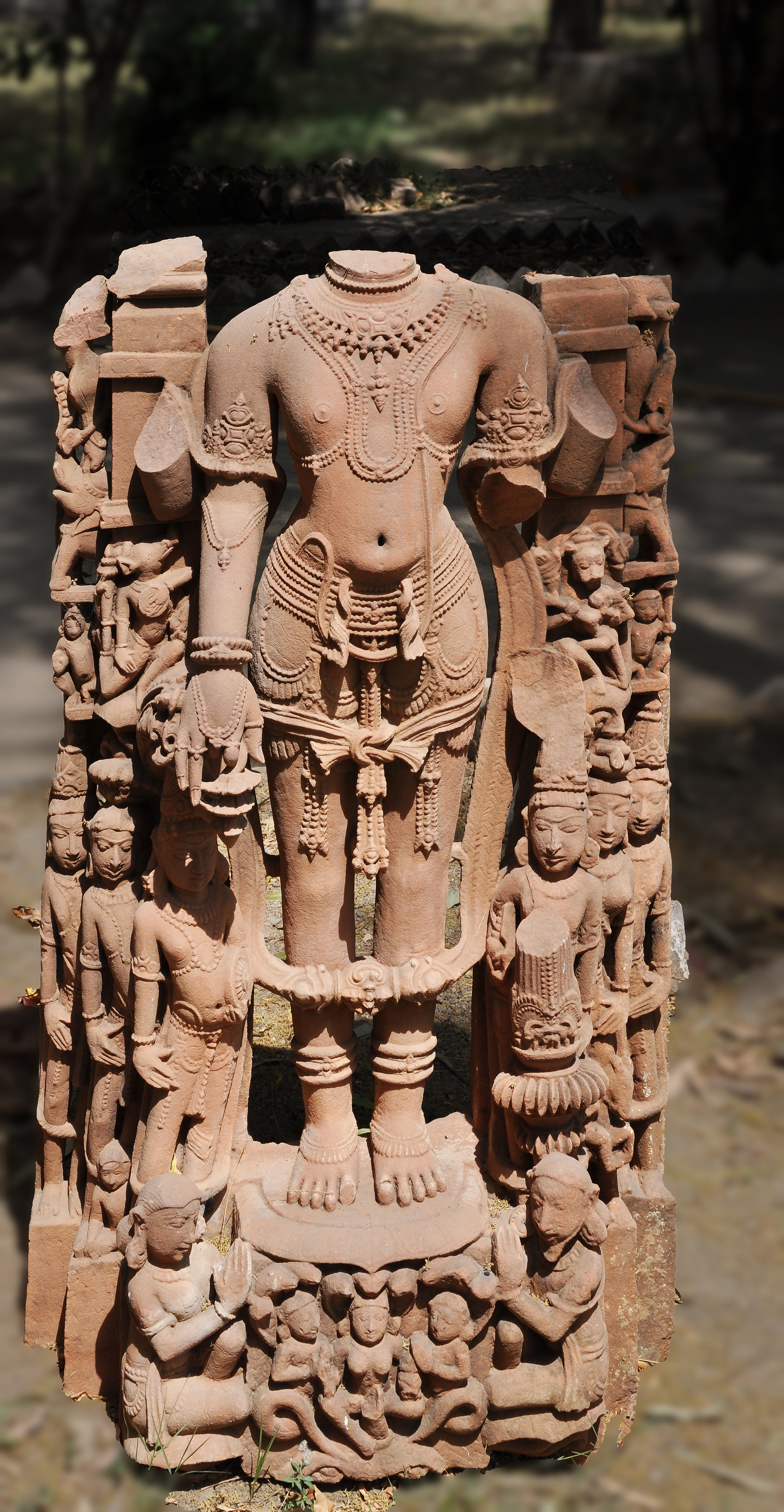
Vishnu
