= Remember Bhopal Museum =

- Established: 2 December 2014
- Location: Senior HIG 22, Housing Board Colony, Berasia Road, Karond, Near Triveni heights Bhopal, Madhya Pradesh, India
- Coordinates: 23.292665°N 77.400600°E
- Type: Memorial museum
- Owner: Remember Bhopal Trust
- Website: rememberbhopal.net

The Remember Bhopal Museum is a museum in Bhopal, Madhya Pradesh, India that commemorates the Bhopal disaster. It collects and exhibits artifacts and records of the affected communities. The museum was opened on 2 December 2014, the 30th anniversary of the disaster.

== History ==
The Bhopal disaster was caused by a gas leak that occurred at the Union Carbide India Limited (UCIL) pesticide plant in Bhopal on 2 December 1984, and became the largest industrial disaster by death toll.

In 2004, Yaad-e-Hadsa, a memorial museum, was created by survivors of the disaster. Its exhibits, such as clothing and other belongings of those who had died, were donated by survivors. However, records of the origins of the exhibits were eventually lost by the organisers. Rama Lakshmi, who is a journalist, museologist and oral historian, and Shalini Sharma, who is an activist and an assistant professor at the Tata Institute of Social Sciences, decided to collect accounts from the survivors directly to link with the donated objects, to be exhibited at a new memorial museum.

In 2009, the Madhya Pradesh government and the Union Government made proposals to build a memorial of the gas tragedy, but the proposals failed.

The Remember Bhopal Trust was formed in 2012 by survivors of the disaster and activists campaigning for restitution for the victims of the disaster. It was formed with the aim of helping sustain the memory of the incident, and to organise commemorative activities, with a focus on the concerns of the victims and survivors of the disaster.

On 2 December 2014, the Remember Bhopal Museum was opened by the Remember Bhopal Trust. The museum is located in a converted flat near the site. According to its curator Rama Lakshmi, it is the first museum in India focusing on a "contemporary social movement for justice". The project, which was the trust's first, is co-ordinated by Shalini Sharma.

== Exhibits ==
The museum exhibits artefacts, oral histories, photographs, protest songs and campaign posters that have emerged in the movement for justice for the victims of the Bhopal disaster.

The survivor groups have worked with Lakshmi and other museum professionals to design and create their own memorial museum, filled with posters, photographs, and artefacts, such as a small victim’s dress, a stopped pocket watch–donated by the families of victims and survivors. Survivors have given to the museum personal objects that are often their last tangible link to those who died because of the gas leak. Many others have recounted their harrowing tales of survival and struggle. The museum’s narrative is shaped by their stories and objects.

== Administration ==
The central goal of the Remember Bhopal Museum is to focus on the voices and concerns of the survivors, as opposed to the government or the industry, in museum or memorial projects.

Rama Lakshmi, Washington Post's India correspondent (and also a museologist) is the curator of the Remember Bhopal Museum.

The museum is housed in a rented building, owned by a disaster-affected family, around 2.5 km away from the Union Carbide factory.

The museum does not accept any government or corporate funds.
