= Munshi Aziz Bhat Museum of Central Asian and Kargil Trade Artefacts =

Munshi Aziz Bhat Museum of Central Asian And Kargil Trade Artefacts
- Established: 2004
- Location: Kargil
- Coordinates: 34.562°N 76.123°E
- Type: Public Museum
- Key holdings: Handwritten Quran, Old Tibetan manuscripts
- Collections: Hukkah, Silk rugs, Coins Ammunitions
- Collection size: 3500
- Director: Gulzar Hussain
- Curator: Ajaz Hussain
- Website: kargilmuseum.org

The Munshi Aziz Bhat Museum of Central Asian and Kargil Trade Artefacts is a family-operated, public museum located in the town of Kargil, in the union territory of Ladakh, India. The museum has on display objects that circulated along the trade routes between Ladakh and Yarkand, as well as other are material relics.

== History ==
The museum has been operational since 2004, owned and maintained by two brothers – Gulzar Hussain Munshi (director) and Ajaz Hussain Munshi (curator) – with assistance from their family members and founding partners International Association for Ladakh Studies. The museum is named after the ancient silk route trader Munshi Aziz Bhat. Objects on display include a variety of artefacts: horse-saddles, tapestries, utensils, coins, old manuscripts and photographs, costumes and jewellery. Though not stated as such, the museum implicitly contributes to the recognition sought for Kargil beyond its current Kashmiri or "Islamic" image in the eye of the common traveler and situates the region in the longue durée of history. The first and only initiative of its kind in the Ladakh region, it is primarily a repository of artifacts associated with the Silk route trade dating back to the 19th century, when Kargil served as a principal trading centre along this passage. Most artefacts displayed in the museum were discovered and retrieved from a rest house Ek Sarai (currently dysfunctional) built in Kargil for traders in 1920 by Munshi Aziz Bhat.

Even though local and international interest in the museum's establishment has grown substantially since its conception, the owners claim to face considerable financial difficulties related to its upkeep and expansion. The brothers intend to eventually relinquish personal ownership of the museum and establish a trust fund. This, they hope, will go a long way in insuring the museum against chronic financial difficulties and generating greater interest amongst academicians and tourists.

For the time being, they continue to invest in the project in the hope of developing a comprehensive repository of their cultural heritage, the memory of which they claim has faded quickly in the wake of a markedly altered geo-political scenario that consumes Kargil.

== Artefacts ==
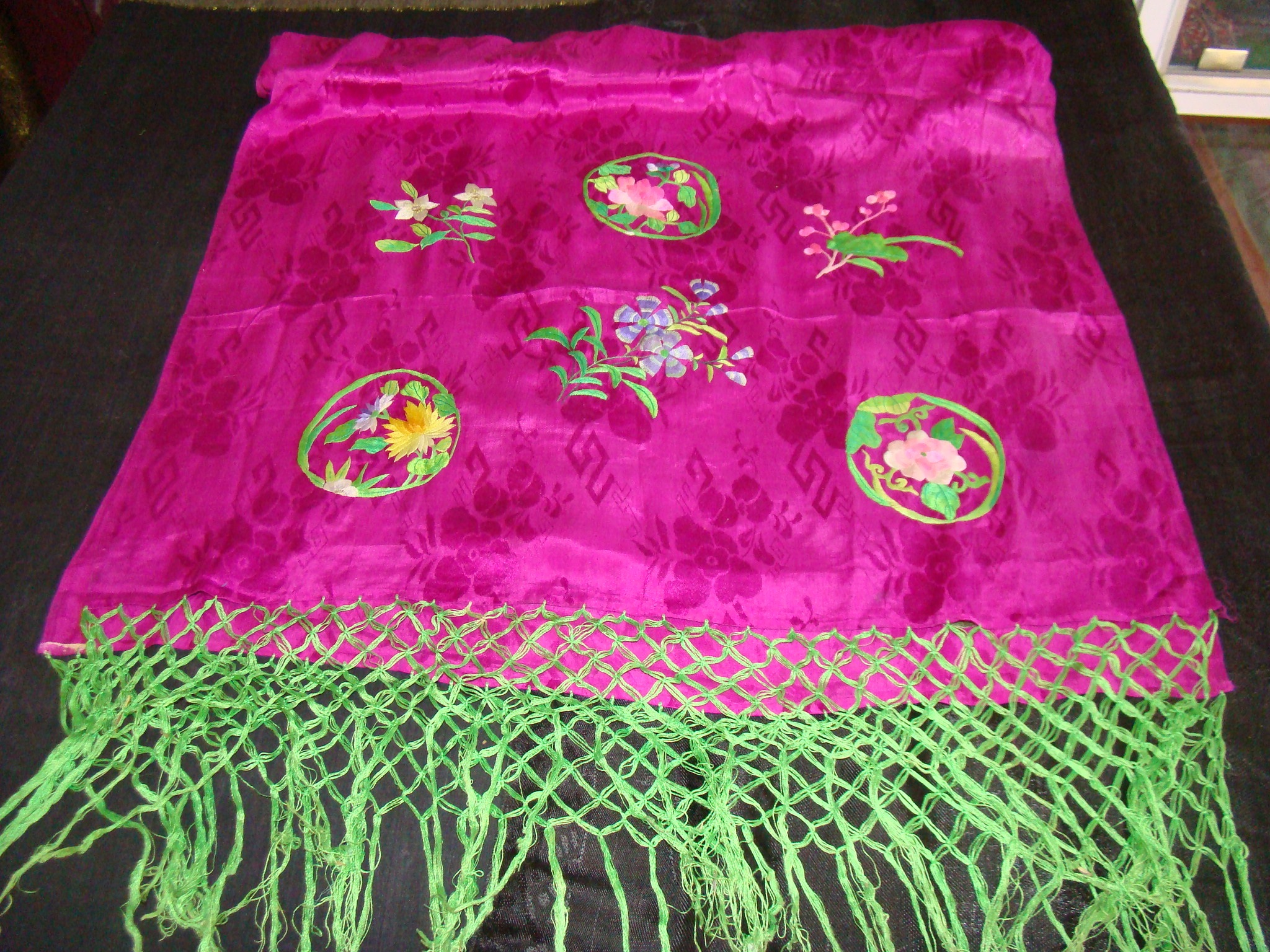
Embroidered Silk from Khotan Period: 17th century

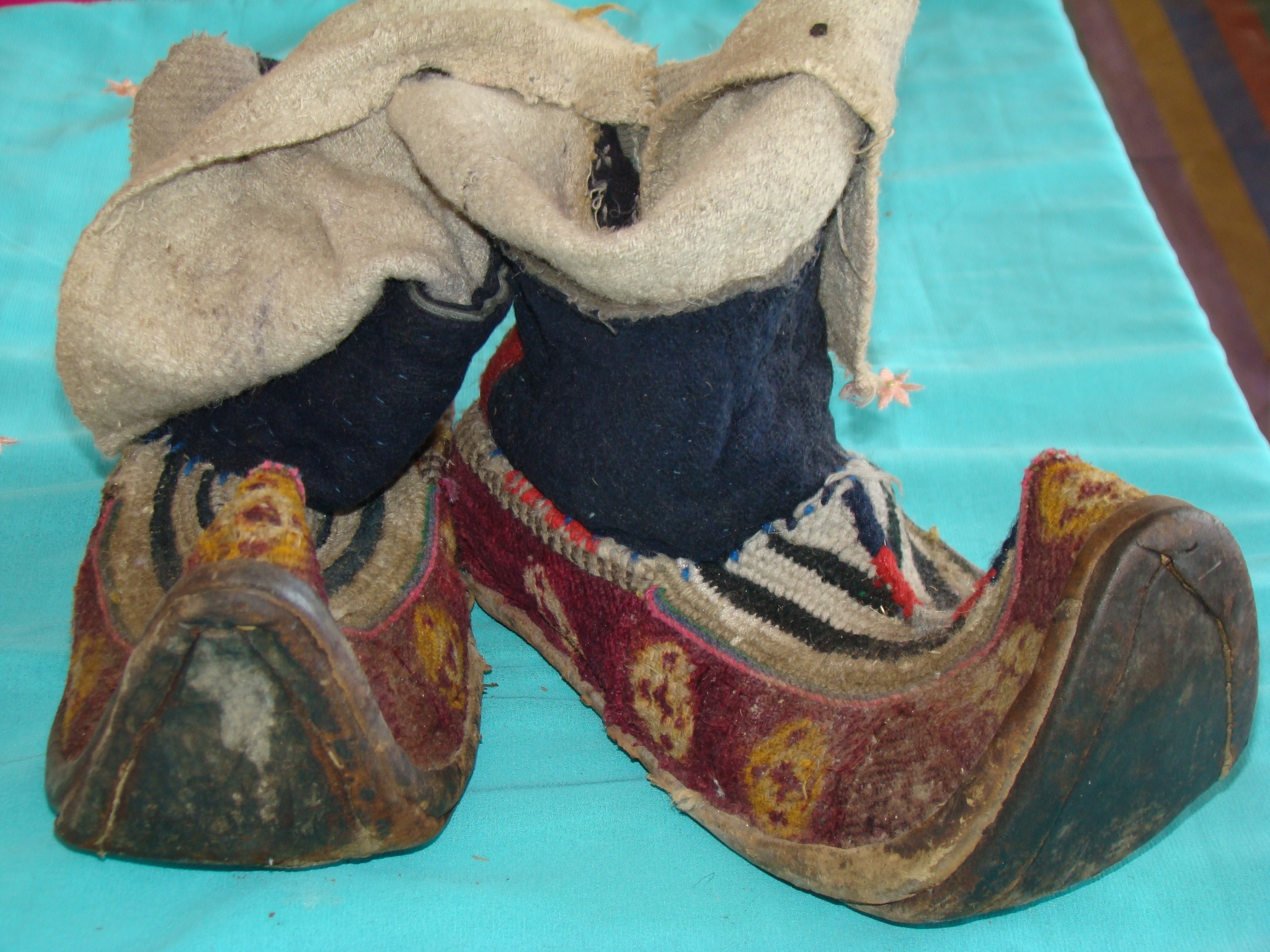
Traditional Ladakhi, Mongolian, Tibetan shoes - Local Name: Papu. Period: 17th century

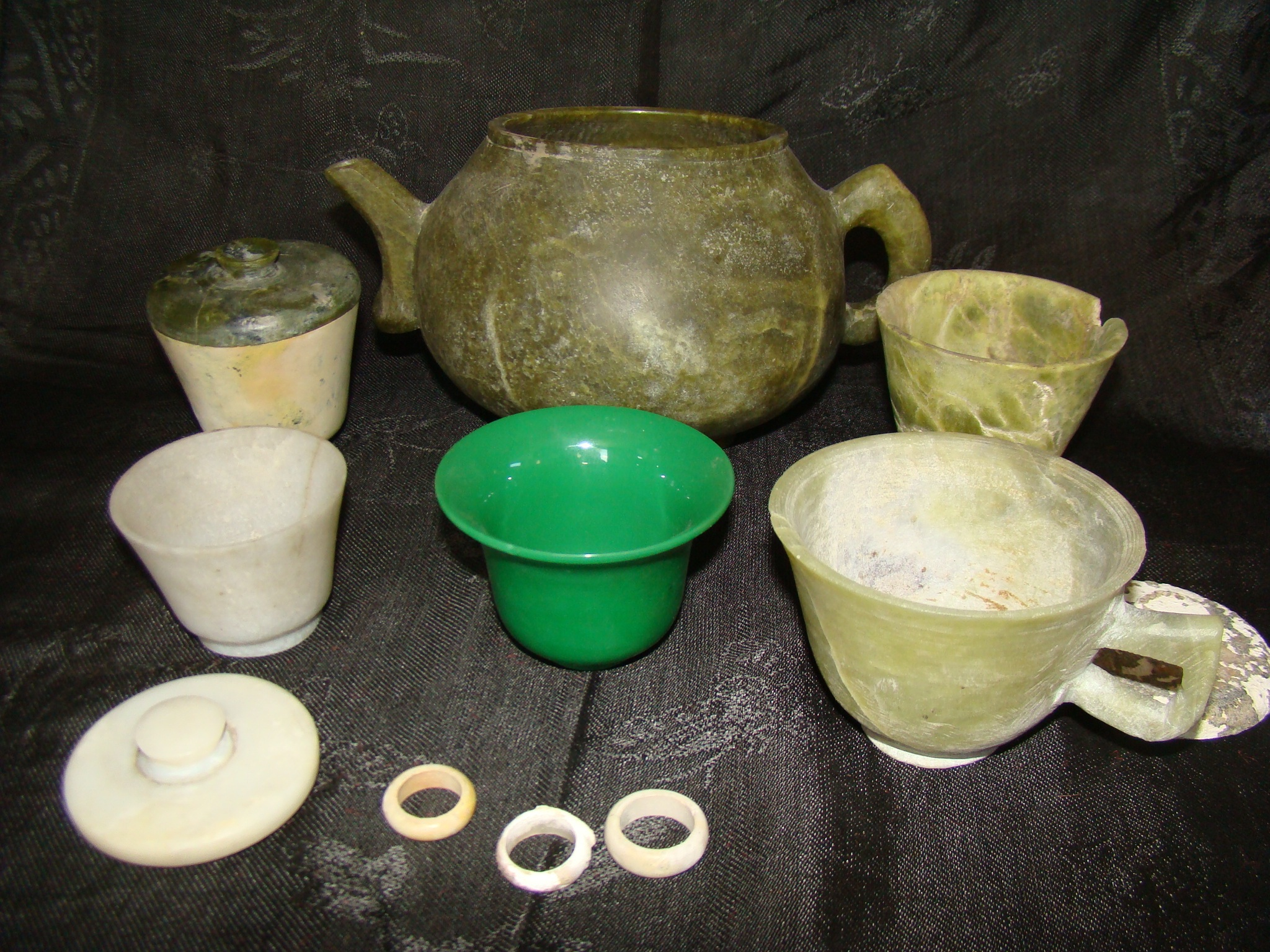
Jade and Serpentine Crockery - Local Name: Zaharmora from Khotan Period: 17th Century

The museum's collection consists primarily of artefacts unearthed at the rest house (Sarai) built by Munshi Aziz Bhat, as also donations by townsfolk and heirs of erstwhile merchants and royalty. Even though the number of artefacts in the museum's possession has grown steadily over the past eight years – it currently houses over 3500 artefacts including a range of mercantile items associated with trade along the Silk Route – only 1000 are on display due to lack of space.

Some of the choicest artefacts picked for exhibition in Delhi included hookah pipes from Yarkand, rugs from Kashgar, fabrics (dyed and raw silk from Khotan in China), natural dyes, costumes, jewelry, coins, shoes, utensils and ammunition. Apart from these, the museum incorporates mercantile items from the late 19th and early 18th centuries like leather skins, coarse cotton cloth, carpets from Central Asia, British horse seats and saddles, buttons from Italy and items from the factory of the Nizam of Hyderabad.

Recently, the museum has acquired handwritten Qurans and Tibetan manuscripts which the owners claim to be around 600–700 years old. The museum has also gathered important documents and artefacts of the Purkis tribe, a major tribe of the Ladakh region. Kacho Ahmad Khan, the great-grandson of the king of ‘Sot’ Kargil and Kacho Sikander Khan, the descendants of the King of Shar Chiktan recently contributed to the list of artefacts by donating old guns, a small cannon, a sword, wooden bowls, a granite stone pot as well as warrior armor. The owners have also obtained their consent to excavate and explore their ancestral fort in Chiktan to look for more artefacts. Currently, work is underway to comprehensively catalog artefacts in their possession.

== Galleries in the museum ==
- Armory
- Caps and Dresses
- Carpets
- Coins and Currencies
- Daily Consumer Goods
- Horse accessories
- Jewel ry
- Lamps and Pipes
- Manuscripts and Books
- Paintings
- Silk
- Utensils and Crockery

== Munshi Aziz Bhat and Ek Sarai ==
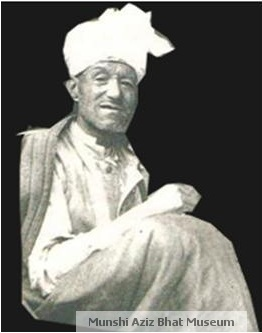
Munshi Aziz Bhat

Munshi Aziz Bhat was the Maharaja of Kashmir, Hari Singh's official petition writer as well as an affluent tradesman based out of Kargil. He joined the revenue department as a Patawari, but quit his job in 1915 in order to dabble in trading. In August 1915, he partnered with a Punjabi Sikh merchant Sardar Kanth Singh and established a retail cum whole sale shop. In 1920, his partnership with Sardar Kanth Singh ended and he established his own trading business with the help of two sons and a cousin. The enterprise was called "Munshi Aziz Bhat And Sons".

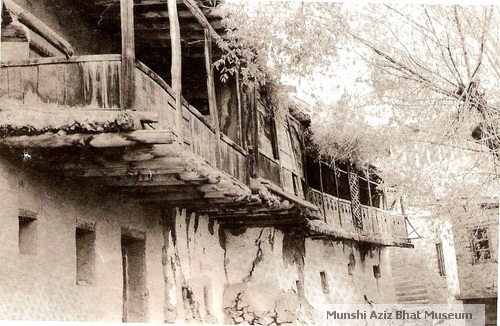
Munshi Aziz Bhat and Sons. Actual Sarai Site in Kargil, Ladakh

In 1920, he constructed the Ek Sarai, a 100 feet by 110 feet structure for traders traversing the Silk Route. A novel endeavor of its time, it was big enough to accommodate 400-500 caravans. The present owners, grandsons of Munshi Aziz Bhat, claim that the basement had a stable for horses, camels and yaks; the ground floor was meant for goods and the cattle; while the first floor had rooms and a kitchen hall. It served as a hub of trading activities and doubled up as a depot for goods going in all directions including Tibet, India and Baltistan. Owed to the prevalence of the barter system, Ek Sarai acquired some of the pieces currently on display in the museum as means of payment from traders availing its facilities. But in 1948, afflicted by the death of Munshi Aziz Bhat as well as the onset of independence from the British Raj and the subsequent partition of the Indian subcontinent (which effectively nullified trade along the Silk routes), Ek Sarai was closed down.

In 1998, while surveying the site with the intention of building a shopping center, the inheritors of this property chanced upon artifacts that lay forgotten inside for half a century. Collaboration with Dr. Jacqueline H. Fewkes, a researcher from the University of Pennsylvania, persuaded them to recognize the value of their discovery. Eventually, the brothers decided to curate the items discovered and establish a museum in Kargil dedicated to the memory of Ek Tajir, as Munshi Aziz Bhat is respectfully referred to.

== Recognition ==
The museum has emerged as a valuable knowledge bank for historical research and several researchers from Kashmir University, Jammu University as well as the Berlin University have availed its resources. The owners also claim to have a tie-up with the Pitt Rivers Museum at University of Oxford in England. Gulzar, one of the owners, has been invited to international conferences where their work has been lauded. In 2006 he was invited to Rome for a conference hosted by La Spezia University in Italy and has also attended a conference at Aarhus University in Denmark. The founding of the museum is chronicled in a documentary film titled The Culture of Here: Preserving Local history in a Local Museum by Jacqueline H. Fewkes and Abdul Nasir Khan.
