= Kacho Sikander Khan =

Indian writer (1917–2007)

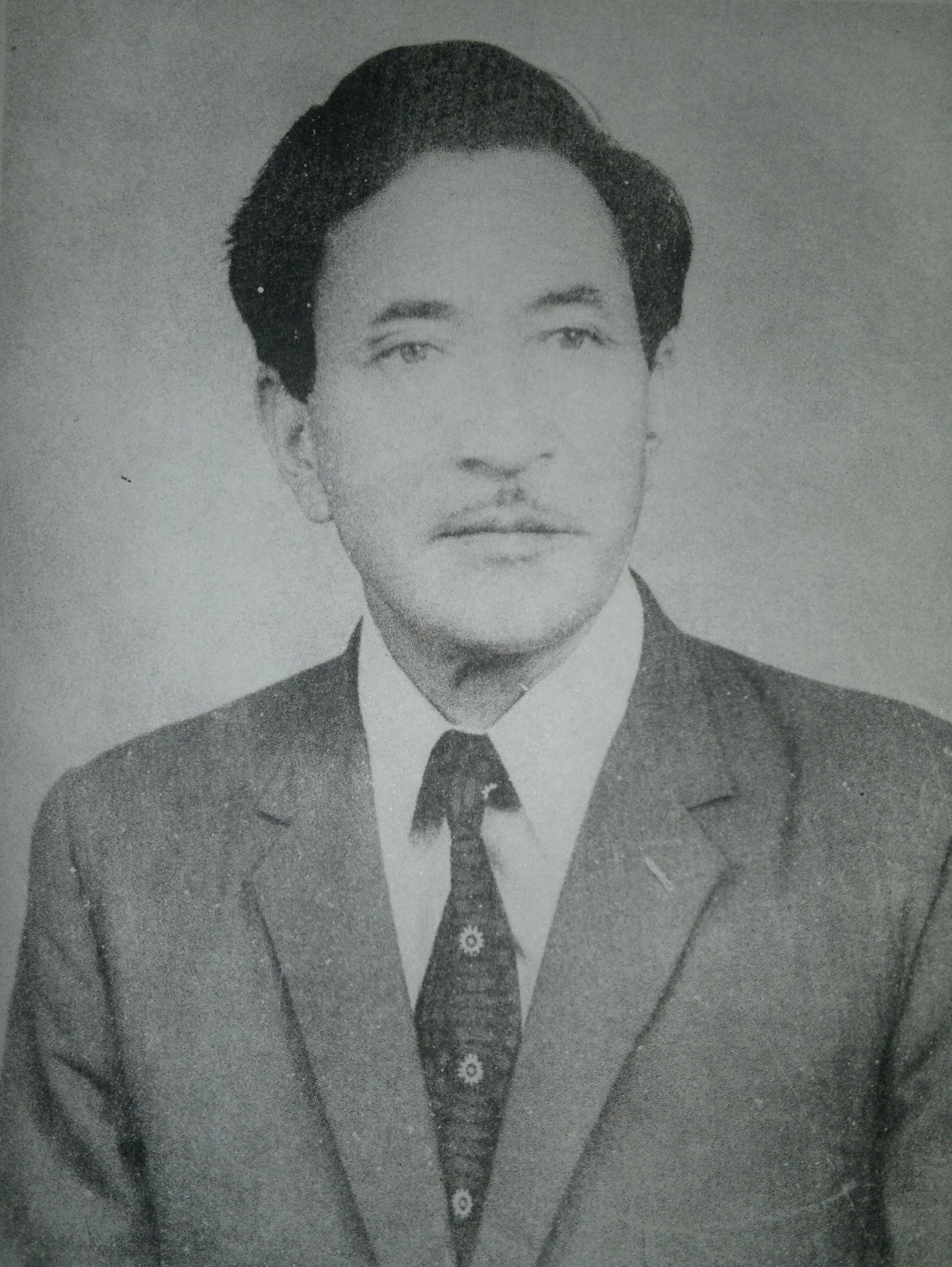
- A picture of a younger Sikander Khan
- Born: Sikander Khan; 1917; Yoqma Kharboo, Kargil
- Died: 14 June 2007
- Resting place: Zamstiang, Kargil
- Other name: Sikander
- Education: S.P College, Srinagar
- Occupation: Public Servant
- Spouse: Roqiya Begum
- Children: 7 sons, 1 daughter
- Writing career
- Years active: 1978-2007
- Subjects: History, folk songs
- Notable works: Qadeem Ladakh - Tarikh-o-tamaddun (Urdu), Ladakh in the Mirror of her Folklore,
- Notable awards: Uttar Pradesh Urdu Academy Award

Kacho Sikander Khan Sikander (1917-2007) was an eminent Indian writer from Kargil District of Ladakh. His work Qadeem Ladakh - Tarikh-o-Tamaddun is a major study of the history of Ladakh from the time people settled in the region up to the post-independent era.

== Early life ==
Sikander Khan belonged to the Gasho family of Chiktan. Born in 1917 he was the eldest son of Kacho Isfindyar Khan. His mother belonged to the family of the Raja Haider Khan of Tambis. There were no schools in his village so at the age of nine he was admitted to a school in the Kargil town so that he could get modern education. His father made him stay with a simple household, the Abaa pa of the Aba Grong, a small locality in the vicinity of Kargil town. When he was in the 9th standard, his father died, and he and his mother had to shoulder the responsibility of the family. After the death of his father, he had to leave his education half way and had to return to his native village. He was then married to Roqiya Begum, who belonged to the Wazir family of Pashkyum. Later, he studied at the S.P College, Srinagar and then went to Amar Singh College, Srinagar.

== Career ==
=== As a public servant ===
In 1947, due to the turmoil that followed the Partition of India and the First Kashmir War he could not sit for his B.A. exams. He came back to his village where he helped among others his brother Mehdi Ali Khan in keeping peace intact in the aftermath of the ongoing turmoil. Prior to that, he got appointed as a teacher at Leh in 1940. He had a good command over the Urdu and Persian languages. In the late forties, he gave up teaching after he was unable to return to Leh following winter vacation in his native village because of the occupation of Kargil by the Gilgit Scouts who had invaded the Ladakh region on behalf of Pakistan. Later, he joined the Kashmir Administrative Service and remained in government service for thirty-four years until his retirement. He served in the capacities of treasurer, Naib-Tehsildar and then became the Tehsildar. He was the Mohtamin-e-Bandobast at Srinagar and retired as an Assistant Commissioner in 1980 and returned to his village.

=== As a writer ===
His first book, an Urdu translation of a Ladakhi epic of "Nurboo Zangpo and iThoq Lhamo" came out in 1978. It was published with the help of the Jammu and Kashmir Cultural Academy. He was awarded for this book by the Uttar Pradesh Urdu Academy.

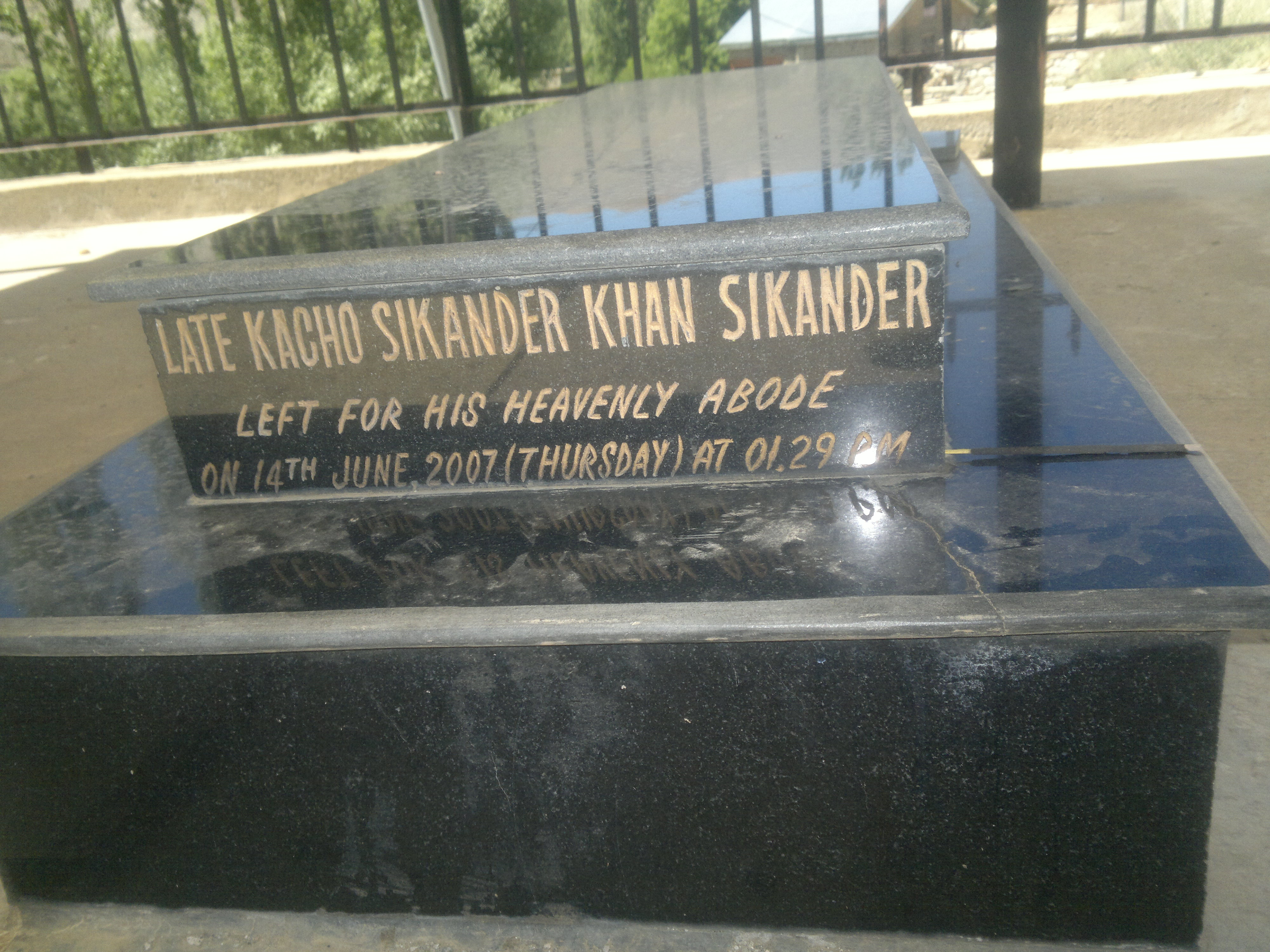
Grave of Kacho Sikander Khan at Zamstiang, Kargil

His next book "Qadeem Ladakh - Tarikh-o-Tamaddun" ("Ancient Ladakh - History & Civilization") came out in 1987. For this book he collected all the previous works done on the history of Ladakh and added a critical and well researched view of his own. He discusses the "Asaar-e-Qademaah", folk songs and "Dev Malas" with great details. The books' introduction reads,

He has picturised the events of the past in a fashion that the reader could easily get a panoramic view of the past of this region. He lay special stress on the importance of the cultural heritage and the Art and Literature of the bygone days.

He followed it up with a study on Ladakhi folklores in his third book entitled "Ladakh in the Mirror of Her Folklores" in the year 1997 which, after a broad survey of Ladakhi culture, included English translations and transliterations into Roman script of 100 Ladakhi folksongs.

His fourth book, Afkaar-e-Parishan, is an autobiography which also contains a number of Urdu poems. Sikandar Khan was pained by the erosion of Ladakh's traditional communal harmony, the deterioration of moral values and growing corruption in society. His autobiography sheds light on his views on these matters. He left one more text, Gachu Lha Brok, which is yet to be published. Gachu is the name of the broq (summer pasture) of Yokma Kharboo, the village where he spent his childhood. It has many features that are related to the epic Kesar Saga.

== Later years ==
Later in his life, he acted as the patron of the International Association for Ladakh Studies. Tashi Rabgias, a contemporary historian belonging to the neighboring Leh district, is now the only living patron after Sikander Khan's death.

== Bibliography ==
- Nurbu Zangpo and Ithoq Lhamo (1978)
- Qadeem Ladakh, Taarik-o-Tamaddun (1987)
- Ladakh in the Mirror of her Folklores (1997)
- Afkaar-e-Pareshan (2004)
- Gachu Lha Broq( UNPUBLISHED)
