= Tashi Rabgias =

Indian scholar and historian (1927–2020)

Tashi Rabgias (1927 - 30 October 2020) was an Indian scholar and historian who belonged to the Union Territory of Ladakh. He was a scholar of Mahayana and Vajrayana Buddhism. He commanded great expertise over the Bhoti language. He has many books to his credit. He has a collection of more than 200 folk songs for which he was awarded a Robe of Honour by the Art Culture and Language Department, Govt of Jammu and Kashmir.

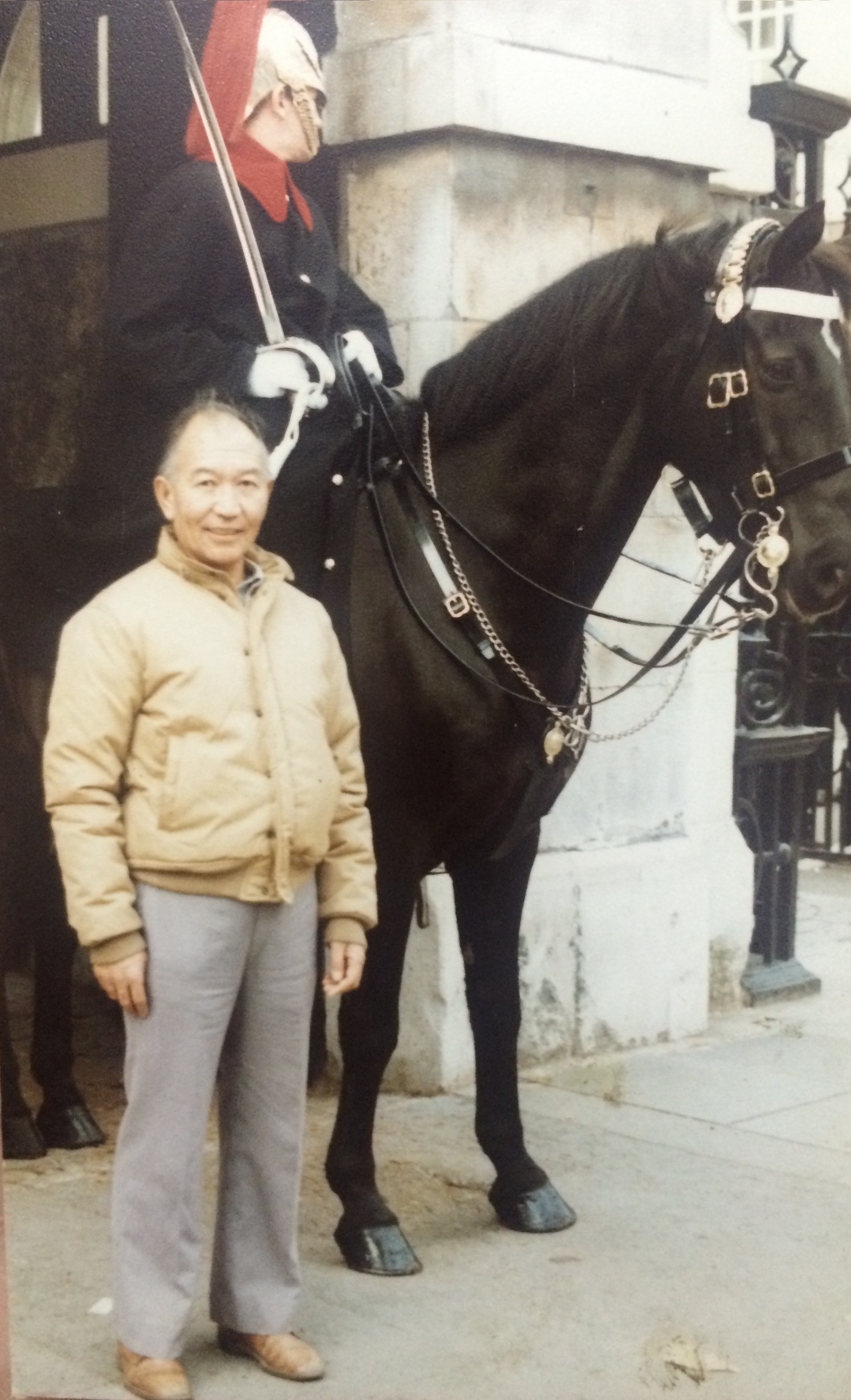
in London

== Early life ==
He was born in the Tukchu family of Sakti village in Leh. He had an inclination towards Buddhist philosophy and its ways of life from a very early age.

== Education ==
He completed his primary education from a Primary School in Chemde village and Secondary education from Sri Pratap College, Srinagar where he got his Bachelor of Arts Degree in 1953.

== Career ==
In 1953, at the age of 27, he started his career as the first Personal Assistant to the first Deputy Minister of J&K Government, 19th Kushok Bakula Rinpoche for a period of four years. He has also worked as an Assistant Editor / Cultural Officer, Gangtok (Sikkim). He served as the incharge Ladakhi Programmer on Radio Kashmir Srinagar from 1960 to 1962. Later he was appointed a lecturer of Buddhist Studies at the University of Delhi in 1963. He also worked as Information Officer, J&K Government from 1964 to 1982. He has been involved in a wide array of social life, being the founder President of the Ladakh Cultural Forum, Leh. Besides, he has been the Secretary, Ladakh Buddhist Association for 7 years from 1964 to 1970. He was also associated with the Sahitya Akademi, New Delhi as a member of the General Council during the period 1998–2000. He also served as Education Officer in Ladakh Ecological Development Group (LeDeG), an NGO. He was one of the founding members of International Association for Ladakh Studies. He has a chair in the name of Gyalwa Lungchen Rabjam at the Central Institute of Buddhist Studies, Leh in recognition of his services to Buddhist studies.

His book "Kunsel Melong" is a study of the history of Ladakh from pre-historic times up to 1947. Apart from the regular political history it also contains many other aspects like the Buddha's teachings, economy, dynasty and religious history. He also started some newsletters titled Yargyas Kongphel and Temdel Sargyur in Bhoti language. Some of his major contributions are:

- Five books including Natir Puja (1961, play translated from English to Bhoti).
- History of Ladakh from early times to 1947 in Bhoti language. 1st edition-1984, 2nd edition-2006.

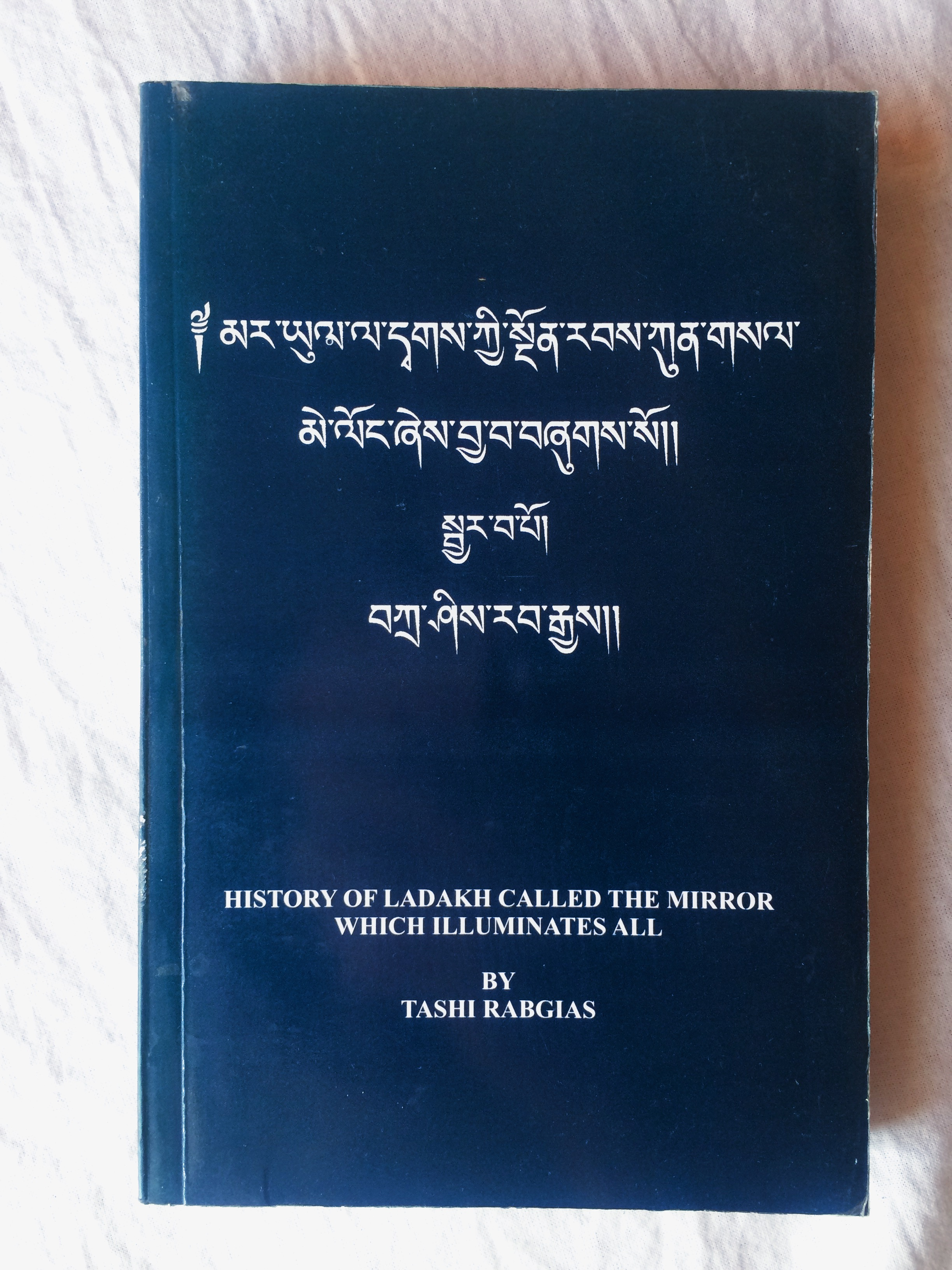
History of Ladakh by Tashi Rabgias

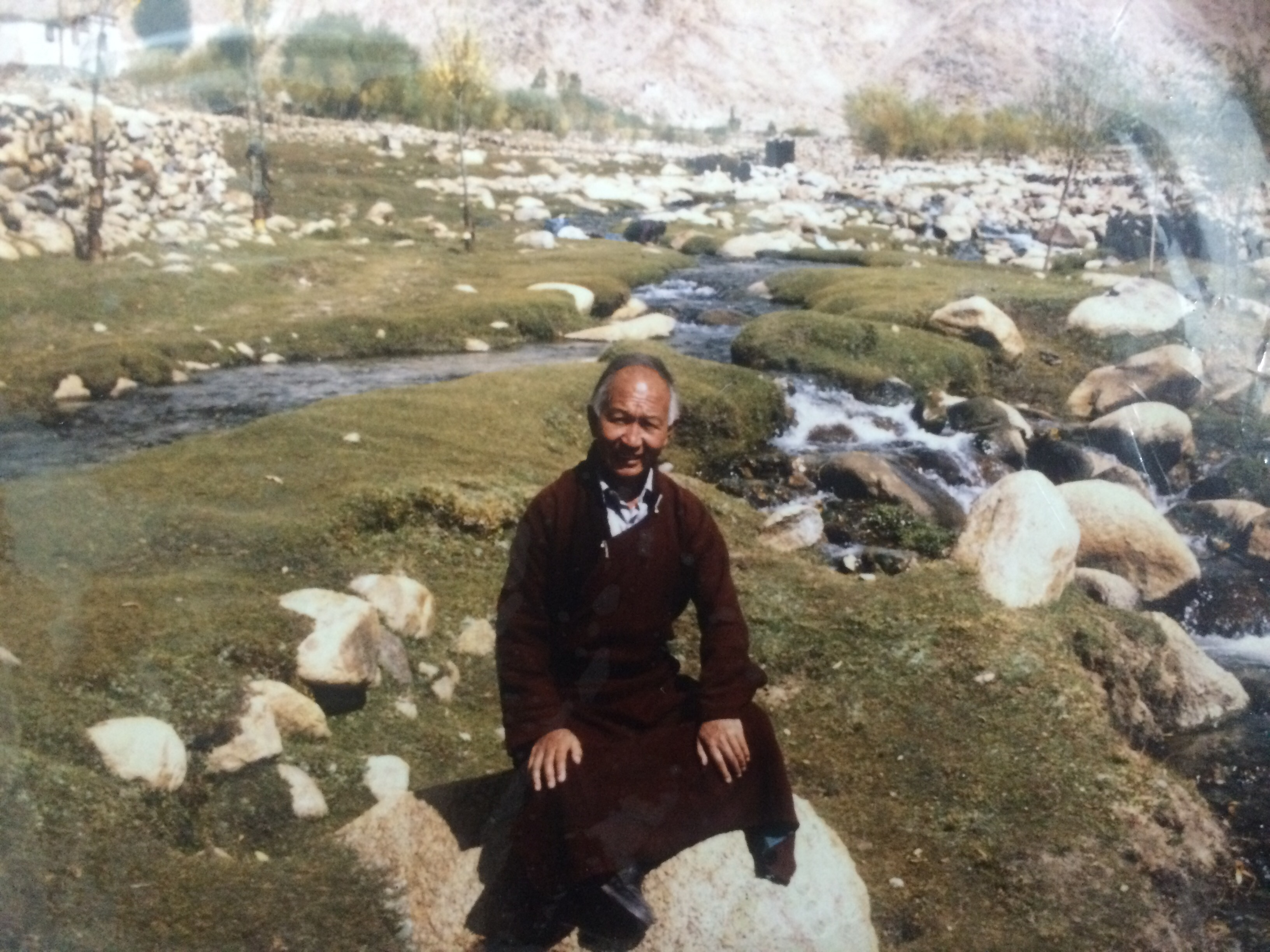
1990

- Ancient Futures translated from English to Bhoti language.
- Collection of 127 Ladakhi Folk Songs published in 1970 by Cultural Academy J&K state.
- Collection of articles in English titled, Ladakh Tradition and Change in 2004.
- Collection of 115 original songs written in Bhoti language, titled Jiksten Kuntoo Gawey Lu in 2007.
- Zosgar Tuski Melong, 1st edition-2003: about the problems of wildlife written in a drama where the characters are wild animals.
- Mangski Ringluks 1st edition-2003- about democracy.
- Sustainable Spirituality in Buddhism in 2009.
- Contributions made for preparing text books in Bhoti language for schools in Ladakh region.

== Later years ==
He was the patron of the International Association for Ladakh Studies for a few years.

== Literary contributions ==
- The anthropological book titled; "Himalayan Buddhist Villages".
- The book titled; "The Yogins of Ladakh" published in 1997.
- One of the three writers who prepared the text book in Bhoti language from 1st to 8th standards for the schools in Ladakh, J&K State.
- Prepared text books for classes 9th and 10th in Bhoti language for the schools in Ladakh.
- He brought out a Newsletter in Bhoti language with the title, “sTendel Sargyur” highlighting ecology, environment and renewable resources. This was done while serving as Education Officer in LeDEG, Leh.
- He published an annual magazine entitled, "Voice of the Himalayas" in English and Bhoti languages for several years.
- He popularized theatre in Ladakh by staging dramas in the 1960s at Leh. Drama scripts and songs were written by him and he also worked as the director, teaching acting etc. to the participants of the drama.
- While serving in LeDEG, seminars were organized in many villages on subjects like education, culture, ecology, environment etc.
- Participated in giving talks on various subjects in the All India Radio Leh, ever since its inception in 1971.
- Contributed articles and songs in the publications brought up by the Cultural Academy, Leh in Bhoti language ever since the establishment of the academy at Leh.
- He performed proof reading of the works of famous Tibetan monk "Taranatha" in seventeen volumes on various subjects and particularly commentaries on Tantra teachings which reached Tibet in the II Spiritual moment which started in the 11th century, found in the Stok Palace which was published by Taru Namgyal.

== Awards ==
- Robe of Honour –2022.
- Sahitya Academy Bhasha Samman – 1998.
- 1st Zings-tak Award by Ladakh Buddhist Association Youth Wing through the Dalai Lama in May-1999.
- Dogra Rattan – in October, 2007.
- Honour of Citation and cash award was given by Governor of J&K state on the occasion of Golden Jubilee of the Central Institute of Buddhist studies Leh.
- State award-2008 for contribution to literature, history and culture of Ladakh.
