= List of populated places in Ukhrul district =

Villages in Ukhrul district of Manipur, India

The Ukhrul district of Manipur state in India is divided into 4 sub-districts called blocks. At the time of the 2011 Census of India, the Kamjong district (created in 2016) was a part of the Ukhrul district.

== Blocks ==
The Ukhrul district is divided into four blocks: Ukhrul, Jessami, Chingai, and Lungchong Maiphei.

At the time of the 2011 census, Ukhrul was divided into following subdivisions: Ukhrul North, Ukhrul Central, Kamjong-Chassad, Phungyar-Phaisat, and Ukhrul South.

== Towns ==
Name	Type	Block	Population	Effective literacy rate	Sex ratio	SC population %	ST population %	Census code (2011)
Ukhrul (Hunphun)	Census Town	Ukhrul	27187	88.92%	954	0.35%	88.66%	270457

== Villages ==
=== Ukhrul block ===
The Ukhrul block includes the following villages:

Name	Population	Effective literacy rate	Sex ratio	SC population %	ST population %	Census code (2011)
Choithar	1392	86.34%	941	0.0%	97.49%	270444
Huining (Halang)	2878	88.1%	1011	0.0%	98.16%	270394
Hatha	154	64.96%	791	0.0%	98.7%	270432
Khamasom	1996	69.64%	865	0.0%	97.24%	270450
Khangkhui Khullen	642	83.88%	1032	0.0%	98.91%	270442
Khangkhui Khunou	841	91.01%	938	0.0%	96.91%	270443
Langdang	1135	81.45%	904	0.0%	97.97%	270446
Lambui (Ramva)	1940	92.86%	900	0.15%	92.78%	270429
Leiyaram	205	94.12%	814	0.0%	91.22%	270409
Litan	127	95.65%	984	0.0%	99.21%	270426
Litan Sareikhong	1000	91.27%	835	0.1%	85.2%	270427
Lunghar	1917	71.99%	1033	0.0%	96.35%	270449
Lungshang Chingkha (Lungshang CK)	324	81.2%	770	0.0%	98.77%	270436
Lungshang Chingthak (Lungshang CT)	210	90.06%	1079	0.0%	96.19%	270437
Mayophung	435	97.41%	1042	0.0%	99.31%	270412
Muirei	324	94.6%	1090	0.0%	98.46%	270410
New Cannon (New Cannan)	1030	93.72%	992	0.0%	96.6%	270408
Nungou	648	68.3%	1084	0.0%	93.67%	270441
Nungshong Khullen	488	59.68%	1017	0.0%	96.31%	270438
Nungshong Khunou	260	94.94%	1167	0.0%	96.92%	270439
Shangkai	284	67.7%	1000	0.0%	99.3%	270424
Shangshak Khullen	2441	87.72%	461	1.76%	48.18%	270433
Shangshak Khunou	1025	87.67%	927	0.0%	97.66%	270434
Shangzing (Shangching)	562	91.27%	892	0.0%	97.86%	270435
Shiroy Chingkha (Shirui CK)	793	95.49%	1018	0.0%	96.47%	270447
Shiroy Chingthak (Shirui CT)	472	90.31%	595	0.0%	75.42%	270448
Shokvao	698	78.1%	1059	0.0%	97.85%	270414
Sihai (Sihai Khullen)	867	72.58%	935	0.0%	95.85%	270451
Sihai Khunou	372	51.51%	918	0.0%	98.39%	270452
T. Chanhong	784	66.1%	950	0.0%	99.11%	270431
T.M. Kasom	570	92.83%	570	0.88%	71.23%	270413
Tushen (Tushar)	2098	77.09%	921	0.0%	98.19%	270430
Wunghon	504	95.08%	1172	0.0%	96.03%	270411
Mangkot Chepu (Mongkot Chepu)	676	70.48%	1006	0.0%	97.93%	270425

=== Jessami block ===
The Jessami block includes the following villages:

Name	Population	Effective literacy rate	Sex ratio	SC population %	ST population %	Census code (2011)
Chingjaroi Christian (Chingjaroi CV)	1280	83.42%	1071	0.0%	98.98%	270369
Chingjaroi Khullen (Chingjaroi K/L)	1825	45.4%	969	0.0%	99.18%	270365
Chinjaroi Khunou (Chingjaroi K/N)	548	68.93%	1015	0.0%	96.9%	270368
Jessami	2765	76.74%	817	0.0%	79.78%	270362
Kharasom	1604	68.06%	958	0.0%	98.82%	270364
New Tusom	1608	89.66%	983	0.0%	98.32%	270383
Razai Khullen (Razai K/L)	421	67.97%	1095	0.0%	98.1%	270366
Razai Khunou (Razai K/N)	470	60.21%	1070	0.0%	99.79%	270367
Soraphung	875	59.6%	923	0.0%	98.51%	270363
Tusom Christian (Tusom CV)	642	93.02%	945	0.0%	98.91%	270384
Tusom (Tusom K/L)	271	70.64%	1101	0.0%	98.89%	270529
Wahong	537	58.63%	953	0.0%	98.14%	270382

=== Chingai block ===
The Chingai block includes the following villages:

Name	Population	Effective literacy rate	Sex ratio	SC population %	ST population %	Census code (2011)
Awang Kasom	687	89.11%	722	0.58%	79.77%	270379
Challow (Challou)	351	76.64%	1017	0.0%	93.45%	270385
Chingai	1118	61.75%	948	0.0%	98.48%	270380
Huishu	1018	87.91%	961	0.0%	96.76%	270387
K. Phungrei	478	61.66%	1087	0.0%	96.65%	270388
Kalhang	1181	41.61%	972	0.0%	98.65%	270377
Kuirei	767	56.15%	987	0.0%	99.35%	270378
Kongai (Kuingai)	383	84.89%	1082	0.0%	97.91%	270381
Marem	327	79.32%	1083	0.0%	96.33%	270372
Maremphung (Marangphung)	298	93.68%	1129	0.0%	100.0%	270371
Namrei	549	79.96%	1004	0.0%	98.36%	270370
Nungbi Khullen	1602	65.36%	980	0.0%	98.06%	270376
Nungbi Khunou (Kachui)	1417	48.04%	1063	0.0%	96.19%	270375
Phungcham	4041	80.29%	999	0.0%	97.8%	270374
Paoyei (Peh / Paoyi)	2617	75.61%	998	0.0%	98.97%	270373
Poi	1595	79.63%	945	0.0%	98.37%	270386

The following villages are not listed in the 2011 census directory: Longpi Kajui, Luireishimphung, Ngahui, Paorei, and Varangalai.

=== Lungchong Maiphei block ===
The Lungchong Maiphei block includes the following villages:

Name	Population	Effective literacy rate	Sex ratio	SC population %	ST population %	Census code (2011)
Champhung	782	81.12%	917	0.0%	96.42%	270397
Huime (Hoomi)	1267	89.37%	943	0.0%	99.37%	270389
Kachai	2107	77.51%	929	0.0%	97.96%	270390
Khamanom (Khumunom)	585	27.2%	924	10.94%	88.03%	270416
Phungthar (L Phungthar)	807	66.9%	945	0.0%	99.13%	270391
Lamlai Chingphei	467	36.63%	938	0.0%	100.0%	270422
Lamlang	964	90.06%	932	0.0%	98.86%	270405
Maichon	529	76.02%	981	0.0%	98.3%	270392
Mollem Kamsei	640	45.09%	945	0.0%	99.53%	270415
Molnom	444	91.82%	897	0.0%	99.55%	270418
Moulsohoi	227	91.63%	991	0.0%	97.8%	270419
Mullam	416	25.6%	882	0.0%	99.52%	270421
Ngaimu	1881	93.45%	951	0.0%	99.47%	270400
Pashong	392	43.92%	885	0.0%	98.98%	270417
Phadang (Phalee)	3742	81.35%	935	0.0%	95.67%	270399
Pharung	1109	81.52%	1005	0.0%	98.38%	270404
Seikhor	935	87.24%	920	0.0%	98.61%	270403
Shongphel	511	86.43%	965	0.0%	84.93%	270420
Sirarakhong	1243	89.89%	1005	0.0%	93.48%	270402
Somdal	2375	92.39%	964	0.0%	97.39%	270395
Tanrui (Leisan)	1007	85.63%	982	0.0%	98.11%	270398
Tuinem (Teinem)	4058	83.09%	998	0.0%	98.47%	270401
Tungou	1971	90.4%	929	0.0%	98.22%	270406
Sanakeithel (Sinakeithei)	2003	97.22%	987	0.0%	86.07%	270407
Tolloi (Talloi)	4296	84.12%	925	0.09%	89.43%	270393
Tora	758	58.89%	1011	0.0%	95.12%	270396
Jalembung (Zalengbung)	306	73.55%	1140	0.0%	98.69%	270423
Yaolen (Yaolen)	325	41.99%	1019	0.0%	97.54%	270428

The following villages are not listed in the 2011 census directory: Maichon and Ngainga.
