= Hatha, Ukhrul =

Hatha
- Village
- Location in Manipur, India Hatha (India)
- Coordinates: 25°01′31″N 94°17′13″E
- Country: India
- State: Manipur
- District: Ukhrul

Population
  - Total: 3,446

Languages
  - Official: Tangkhul (Hatha tou)
- Time zone: UTC+5:30 (IST)
- PIN: 795142
- Vehicle registration: MN
- Nearest city: Ukhrul Imphal
- Literacy: 84.96%
- Lok Sabha constituency: Outer Manipur
- Vidhan Sabha constituency: Ukhrul
- Website: manipur.gov.in

Hatha is a small Village located south-west of Ukhrul in Ukhrul district, Manipur state, India. The village is about 20 kilometers from Ukhrul via National Highway 150 that connects Imphal and Kohima via Ukhrul and Jessami. Hatha is flanked by Hungpung in the north, Ramva in the south, Shangshak in the east and Tashar in the West. Locally, the inhabitants speak Hatha tui which belongs to the Tibeto-Burman language family.

== Total population ==
According to 2011 census, Hatha has 30 households with the total of 154 people of which 86 are male and 68 are female. Of the total population, 17 were in the age group of 0–6 years. The average sex ratio of the village is 791 female to 1000 male which is higher than the state average of 985. The literacy rate of the village stands at 92.96%. Male literacy rate stands at 94.83% while female literacy rate was 90.00%.

== People and occupation ==
The village is home to people of Tangkhul Naga tribe. Majority of the inhabitants are Christians. Agriculture is the primary occupation of the inhabitants. Hatha is one of the 44 villages considered likely to be affected as a catchment area when the Mapithel multi purpose project is finally functional.
