= Kuirei =

- Village
- Location in Manipur, India Kuirei (India)
- Coordinates: 25°14′56″N 94°27′20″E
- Country: India
- State: Manipur
- District: Ukhrul

Population
  - Total: 767

Languages
  - Official: Tangkhul (KURE TU)
- Time zone: UTC+5:30 (IST)
- PIN: 795142
- Vehicle registration: MN
- Nearest city: Ukhrul Kohima
- Literacy: 56.15%
- Lok Sabha constituency: Outer Manipur
- Vidhan Sabha constituency: Chingai
- Website: manipur.gov.in

Kuirei is a village located north of Ukhrul in Ukhrul district, Manipur state, India. The village is approximately 41 kilometers from Ukhrul. National Highway 150 Imphal-Kohima via Jessami passes through the village. Kuirei is one of the villages that used to make indigenous salt from salt springs and supply to other Tangkhul villages before the advent of common salt. The village is flanked by Phungcham and Peh in the west, Huishu and Khamasom in the east, Kalhang in the south and Ngahui and Marem in the North. Locally inhabitants speak Kuirei dialect which belongs to the Tibeto-Burman language family.

== Total population ==
According to 2011 census, Kuirei has 141 households with the total of 767 people of which 386 are male and 381 are female. Of the total population, 60 were in the age group of 0–6 years. The average sex ratio of the village is 987 female to 1000 male which is higher than the state average of 985. The literacy rate of the village stands at 56.15%. Male literacy rate stands at 62.39% while female literacy rate was 50.00%.

== People and occupation ==
The village is home to people of Tangkhul Naga tribe. Majority of the inhabitants are Christians. Agriculture is the primary occupation of the inhabitants, and Kuirei is known for engaging in largescale apiculture. The village is known for acute scarcity of water mainly during the dry season.
