= Poi, Ukhrul =

Poi
- Village
- Location in Manipur, India Poi (India)
- Coordinates: 25°16′37″N 94°33′22″E
- Country: India
- State: Manipur
- District: Ukhrul

Population
  - Total: 1,595

Languages
  - Official: Tangkhul (Poi Tui)
- Time zone: UTC+5:30 (IST)
- PIN: 795142
- Vehicle registration: MN
- Nearest city: Imphal
- Literacy: 79.63%
- Lok Sabha constituency: Outer Manipur
- Vidhan Sabha constituency: Chingai
- Website: manipur.gov.in

Poi is a village located north of Ukhrul in Ukhrul district, Manipur state, India. The village is partially connected by National Highway 150, Imphal-Kohima road via Jessami. Poi is 68 kilometers away from Ukhrul via Awangkasom and about 3 kilometers and 5 kilometers away from Indo-Myanmar border pillar number 126 and 130 respectively. Poi is flanked by Challou in the North, Chingai in the north west, Ngahui, Kuirei and Marem in the west, Huishu and Khamasom in the south. MK Preshow Shimray, the Ex- MLA from Chingai Assembly Constituency and also the Deputy Speaker of the present Manipur Legislative Assembly hails from this village.

== Total population ==
As per 2011 census, Poi has 253 households with the total of 1595 people of which 820 are male and 775 are female. Of the total population, 171 were in the age group of 0–6 years. The average sex ratio of Poi village is 945 female to 1000 male which is lower than the state average of 985. The literacy rate of the village stands at 79.63%. Male literacy rate stands at 84.34% while female literacy rate was 74.71%.

== People and occupation ==
The village is home to people of Tangkhul Naga tribe. Majority of the inhabitants are Christians. Agriculture is the primary occupation of the inhabitants. The village is well known in the district for its scenic beauty. Poi is one of the few Tangkhul villages where the seed sowing festival (Luira/Luita) of the Tangkhuls is celebrated in strict adherence to traditional style of yore.
