= Razai, Ukhrul =

Razai
- Village
- Location in Manipur, India Razai (India)
- Coordinates: 25°18′02″N 94°26′47″E
- Country: India
- State: Manipur
- District: Chingai

Population
  - Total: 891

Languages
  - Official: Tangkhul Razai
- Time zone: UTC+5:30 (IST)
- PIN: 795142
- Vehicle registration: MN
- Nearest city: Ukhrul Kohima
- Literacy: 60.21%
- Lok Sabha constituency: Outer Manipur
- Vidhan Sabha constituency: Chingai

Razai is a generic reference two villages, Razai Khullen and Razai Khunou Ukhrul in Ukhrul district, Manipur state, India. The village falls under Chingai sub division. National Highway 150 that connects Imphal-Kohima via Ukhrul and Jessami passes through the village. Razai is about 50 kilometers from Ukhrul; and is flanked by Peh in the west, Awang Kasom in the south, Chingai in the east and Maremphung in the north. Locally, the inhabitants speak Razai dialect that belongs to the Tibeto-Burman language family.

== Total population ==
According to 2011 census, Razai Khullen has 84 households with the total of 421 people of which 201 are male and 220 are female. Of the total population, 62 were in the age group of 0–6 years. The average sex ratio of the village is 1095 female to 1000 male which is higher than the state average 985. The literacy rate of the village stands at 67.97% which is lower than the state average 76.94%. Male literacy rate stands at 77.25% while female literacy rate was 59.90%.

According to 2011 census, Razai Khunou has 89 households with the total of 470 people of which 227 are male and 243 are female. Of the total population, 83 were in the age group of 0–6 years. The average sex ratio of the village is 1070 female to 1000 male which is higher than the state average 985. The literacy rate of the village stands at 60.21% which is lower than the state average 76.94%. Male literacy rate stands at 58.64% while female literacy rate was 61.73%.

== People and occupation ==
The village is home to people of Tangkhul Naga tribe. A majority of the inhabitants are Christians. Agriculture is the primary occupation for majority of the inhabitants.
