= Talui =

Talui Tolloi
- Village
- Location in Manipur, India Talui (India)
- Coordinates: 25°11′03″N 94°19′28″E
- Country: India
- State: Manipur
- District: Ukhrul

Population
  - Total: 4,296

Languages
  - Official: Tangkhul (Taluitew)
- Time zone: UTC+5:30 (IST)
- PIN: 795142
- Vehicle registration: MN
- Nearest city: Ukhrul
- Literacy: 76.94%
- Lok Sabha constituency: Outer Manipur
- Vidhan Sabha constituency: Chingai

Talui is the second biggest township in Ukhrul district, Manipur state, India. According to 2011 census, Talui has 960 households with the total population of 4296 of which 2232 were male and 2064 female. It is a beautiful township situated at an altitude 3500 ft. above the sea level. It is surrounded by four mountain ranges. On the north is the Torei Kaphung, on the east is the Nilai Kaphung, on the west is the Malew Kaphung and on the south is the Ngainga Kaphung. Neighboring villages of Talui are Ngainga, Halang, Phungcham Hoomi and Somdal.

The township was also called as 'Tolloi' a misnomer name for 'Talui' coined by outsiders. Talui has 6 sub areas called tangs and they are Ruireitang, Masorimtang, Alungtang, Vashumtang, Keinungtang and Awontang. There are two churches in Talui, the (majority) Baptist Church and the Roman Catholic Church. The residents of the township were among the first in the Tangkhul community to embrace Christianity.

Talui is about 120 km (via Ukhrul) from the state capital Imphal. One can reach the place either by taxis or private vehicles. There is no bus service between Imphal to Talui.

== People and occupation ==
There are 5 schools and 1 college. They are Talui Phungton JB school, Talui Elite Christian English School, Talui Academy Higher secondary school, Talui Hubert school and St Joseph school Talui. Literacy rate of the township is 75%.

Agriculture is the primary occupation of the residents of Talui. The major agricultural products of this township are rice, maize, potatoes, cabbage, garlic, etc. It also produces green tea, called Nilai Tea, which is grown in the eastern hill called Nilai Kaphung. Tea production is made through hand picking and sun drying which is believed to have great medicinal value. The uniqueness of Talui tea is that the real flavor comes when the leaf is boiled for the second time. Talui is the first place in Manipur to experiment with tea planting. Talui has the distinction of producing outstanding people in different walks of life, ranging from renowned public leaders to high-ranking government officers. Interestingly, Lt. Mr. Mazachang Raikhan became the first Indian Railway Service Officer from Manipur followed by his two daughters Lt. Mrs. Christianson Chibber Raikhan and Mrs. Primrose Sharma Raikhan who emulated the success of his father by becoming the first woman Indian Administrative Service Officer (IAS 1975) and the first Indian Foreign Officer (IFS 1976) from Manipur respectively. Talui is also popularly known as the village of Lt. Mr. Ramyo Zimik who was known for his contribution to the Naga National Movement particularly, his involvement with Naga National Council (NNC).

== Organizations ==
1. Talui Village Authority
2. Talui Reisang Youth Club
3. Talui Katamnao Long
4. Talui Women Society
5. Talui Kharar Long
6. Talui Ecotourism
