= Shokvao =

- village
- Location in Manipur, India Shokvao (India)
- Coordinates: 24°59′20″N 94°15′52″E
- Country: India
- State: Manipur
- District: Ukhrul

Population
  - Total: 698

Languages
  - Official: Tangkhul (Shokvao tui)
- Time zone: UTC+5:30 (IST)
- PIN: 795142
- Vehicle registration: MN
- Nearest city: Ukhrul
- Literacy: 78.10%
- Lok Sabha constituency: Outer Manipur
- Vidhan Sabha constituency: Ukhrul
- Website: manipur.gov.in

Shokvao is a village located south of Ukhrul district, Manipur. National Highway 150 that connects Imphal and Ukhrul passes through the village. Shokvao is about 75 kilometers from Imphal and about 7 kilometers from Ukhrul. The village is flanked by Ramva in the north, Shangshak in the east, Lungpha in the south and Songphel Kuki village in the west. The inhabitants talk Shokvao dialect which belongs to the Tibeto-Burman language family. The name 'Shokvao' means come out and shout in Tangkhul dialect. The origin of the village name is attributed to a myth that the Tangkhuls in the process of migration were lost and that their leader stood at the present location of the village shouted to all to get together there.

== Population ==
According to 2011 census, Shokvao has 146 households with the total of 698 people of which 339 are male and 359 are female. Of the total population, 109 were in the age group of 0–6 years. The average sex ratio of the village is 1059 female to 1000 male which is higher than the state average of 985. The literacy rate of the village stands at 78.10% which is higher than the state average 76.94%. Male literacy rate stands at 81.72% while female literacy rate was 74.58%.

== People and Occupation ==
Agriculture is the main occupation of the settlers. The main crops grown in the village are rice, corn, and pulses of many varieties. Shokvao is well known in Ukhrul district for potato and chilli cultivation. The village also is home to various flora and fauna. Majority of the inhabitants are Christians.
