= Chingai Assembly constituency =

Legislative Assembly constituency in Manipur State, India

Coordinates: 25.31°N 94.5°E

Chingai
- Constituency for the Manipur Legislative Assembly

Constituency details
- Country: India
- Region: Northeast India
- State: Manipur
- District: Ukhrul
- Lok Sabha constituency: Outer Manipur
- Established: 1972
- Total electors: 47,449
- Reservation: ST

Member of Legislative Assembly
- 12th Manipur Legislative Assembly
- Incumbent Khashim Vashum
- Party: NPF
- Alliance: NDA
- Elected year: 2022

Chingai is one of the 60 Vidhan Sabha constituencies in the Indian state of Manipur that makes up the Manipur Legislative Assembly. It is named after the village of Chingai in Ukhrul district.

== Members of the Legislative Assembly ==
Year	Member	Party
1972	P. Peter	Independent politician
1974	Somi A. Shimray	Manipur Hills Union
1980	Somi A. Shimray	Janata Party
1984	R. V. Mingthing	Indian National Congress
1990	Somi A. Shimray	Manipur Peoples Party
1995	Dr. Mashangthei Horam	Indian National Congress
2000	Dr. Khashim Ruivah	Federal Party of Manipur
2002	A. Aza	Indian National Congress
2007	Dr. Khashim Ruivah	Independent politician
2012	M. K. Preshow Shimray	Indian National Congress
2017	Khashim Vashum	Naga People's Front
2022	Khashim Vashum	Naga People's Front

== Election results ==
Vote share of winning candidates
2022	31.39%
2017	51.70%
2012	36.96%
2007	60.88%
2002	28.00%
2000	23.13%
1995	37.91%
1990	26.75%
1984	33.72%
1980	40.54%
1974	44.84%
1972	27.83%

=== 2027 Assembly election ===
2027 Manipur Legislative Assembly election: Chingai
Party	Candidate	Votes	%	±%
INC				
NDA				
NOTA	None of the above			
Majority				
Turnout				
gain from		Swing		

=== 2022 Assembly election ===
2022 Manipur Legislative Assembly election: Chingai
Party	Candidate	Votes	%	±%
NPF	Khashim Vashum	12,837	31.39%	−20.32%
NPP	Ningam Chamroy	10,501	25.68%	
BJP	M. K. Preshow Shimray	9,349	22.86%	−4.99%
INC	Sword Vashum	8,150	19.93%	0.07%
Margin of victory		2,336	5.71%	−18.14%
Turnout		40,898	86.19%	8.35%
Registered electors		47,449		15.17%
NPF hold		Swing	-20.32%	

=== 2017 Assembly election ===
2017 Manipur Legislative Assembly election: Chingai
Party	Candidate	Votes	%	±%
NPF	Khashim Vashum	16,582	51.70%	23.01%
BJP	Sword Vashum	8,932	27.85%	
INC	M. K. Preshow Shimray	6,370	19.86%	−17.10%
Margin of victory		7,650	23.85%	20.80%
Turnout		32,071	77.84%	7.64%
Registered electors		41,200		8.37%
NPF gain from INC		Swing	14.74%	

=== 2012 Assembly election ===
2012 Manipur Legislative Assembly election: Chingai
Party	Candidate	Votes	%	±%
INC	M. K. Preshow Shimray	9,865	36.96%	3.67%
Independent	Khashim Vashum	9,050	33.91%	
NPF	Paul Muinao	7,659	28.70%	
Margin of victory		815	3.05%	−24.54%
Turnout		26,688	70.20%	−7.33%
Registered electors		38,018		0.84%
INC gain from Independent		Swing	-23.92%	

=== 2007 Assembly election ===
2007 Manipur Legislative Assembly election: Chingai
Party	Candidate	Votes	%	±%
Independent	Dr. Khashim Ruivah	17,796	60.88%	
INC	A. Aza	9,731	33.29%	5.29%
MSCP	R. V. Mingthing	1,503	5.14%	0.70%
Margin of victory		8,065	27.59%	25.91%
Turnout		29,230	77.53%	−10.11%
Registered electors		37,702		17.68%
Independent gain from INC		Swing	32.88%	

=== 2002 Assembly election ===
2002 Manipur Legislative Assembly election: Chingai
Party	Candidate	Votes	%	±%
INC	A. Aza	7,761	28.00%	11.32%
FPM	Dr. Khashim Ruivah	7,294	26.32%	
SAP	David N. K. Shimray	6,459	23.31%	6.04%
BJP	R. N. Chihanpam	4,429	15.98%	−3.28%
MSCP	R. V. Mingthing	1,232	4.45%	−7.83%
NCP	V. Weapon Zimik	539	1.94%	−6.65%
Margin of victory		467	1.69%	−2.18%
Turnout		27,714	87.64%	2.06%
Registered electors		32,038		5.24%
INC gain from FPM		Swing	-9.91%	

=== 2000 Assembly election ===
2000 Manipur Legislative Assembly election: Chingai
Party	Candidate	Votes	%	±%
FPM	Dr. Khashim Ruivah	3,950	23.13%	
BJP	R. N. Chihanpam	3,290	19.26%	
SAP	David N. K. Shimray	2,948	17.26%	−4.72%
INC	Grace T. Shatsang	2,850	16.69%	−21.22%
MSCP	Dr. Mashangthei Horam	2,096	12.27%	
NCP	John Raleng	1,467	8.59%	
RJD	P. Rathing	477	2.79%	
Margin of victory		660	3.86%	−12.06%
Turnout		17,078	56.72%	−28.86%
Registered electors		30,442		12.22%
FPM gain from INC		Swing	-14.78%	

=== 1995 Assembly election ===
1995 Manipur Legislative Assembly election: Chingai
Party	Candidate	Votes	%	±%
INC	Dr. Mashangthei Horam	8,716	37.91%	11.19%
SAP	David N. G. Zimik	5,054	21.98%	
Independent	Khathing	2,980	12.96%	
Manipur Hill People'S Council	V. Weapon Zimik	2,440	10.61%	
JD	R. V. Mingthing	1,687	7.34%	
JP	P. Rathing	1,129	4.91%	
Independent	S. Kapow	984	4.28%	
Margin of victory		3,662	15.93%	15.90%
Turnout		22,990	85.59%	2.40%
Registered electors		27,126		−3.16%
INC gain from MPP		Swing	11.17%	

=== 1990 Assembly election ===
1990 Manipur Legislative Assembly election: Chingai
Party	Candidate	Votes	%	±%
MPP	Somi A. Shimray	6,180	26.75%	6.33%
INC	Mashangthei Horam	6,174	26.72%	−7.00%
JD	R. Ngalengai	6,003	25.98%	
INS(SCS)	David N. K. Shimray	3,417	14.79%	
Manipur Hill People'S Council	V. Weapon Zimik	1,332	5.76%	
Margin of victory		6	0.03%	−0.30%
Turnout		23,106	83.19%	1.22%
Registered electors		28,011		41.64%
MPP gain from INC		Swing	-6.97%	

=== 1984 Assembly election ===
1984 Manipur Legislative Assembly election: Chingai
Party	Candidate	Votes	%	±%
INC	R. V. Mingthing	5,348	33.72%	
Independent	J. Khathing	5,296	33.39%	
MPP	Somi A. Shimary	3,238	20.41%	
Independent	P. Rathing	806	5.08%	
Independent	V. Weapon Zimik	745	4.70%	
Independent	K. Keison	428	2.70%	
Margin of victory		52	0.33%	−2.72%
Turnout		15,861	81.97%	3.95%
Registered electors		19,776		12.65%
INC gain from JP		Swing	-6.82%	

=== 1980 Assembly election ===
1980 Manipur Legislative Assembly election: Chingai
Party	Candidate	Votes	%	±%
JP	Somi A. Shimray	5,472	40.54%	
Independent	P. Peter	5,060	37.48%	
INC(I)	Standhope Muivah	2,715	20.11%	
Independent	Ngayan	252	1.87%	
Margin of victory		412	3.05%	−6.32%
Turnout		13,499	78.02%	−0.61%
Registered electors		17,555		26.11%
JP gain from Manipur Hills Union		Swing	-4.30%	

=== 1974 Assembly election ===
1974 Manipur Legislative Assembly election: Chingai
Party	Candidate	Votes	%	±%
Manipur Hills Union	Somi A. Shimray	4,847	44.84%	
INC	P. Peter	3,834	35.47%	24.54%
Independent	Standhope Muivah	1,210	11.19%	
Independent	Yarui Ngam	919	8.50%	
Margin of victory		1,013	9.37%	−0.60%
Turnout		10,810	78.63%	3.82%
Registered electors		13,920		70.71%
Manipur Hills Union gain from Independent		Swing	17.01%	

=== 1972 Assembly election ===
1972 Manipur Legislative Assembly election: Chingai
Party	Candidate	Votes	%	±%
Independent	P. Peter	1,666	27.83%	
Independent	Som I	1,069	17.86%	
Independent	Standhope Muivah	881	14.72%	
Independent	Mingthing	865	14.45%	
INC	Prem	654	10.93%	
Independent	Zingthan	474	7.92%	
Independent	Khongsan Keison	377	6.30%	
Margin of victory		597	9.97%	
Turnout		5,986	74.81%	
Registered electors		8,154		
Independent win (new seat)				

== See also ==
- List of constituencies of the Manipur Legislative Assembly
- Ukhrul district
