= Nungbi Khullen =

- Village
- Location in Manipur, India Nungbi Khullen (India)
- Coordinates: 25°12′23″N 94°27′30″E
- Country: India
- State: Manipur
- District: Chingai

Population
  - Total: 1,602

Languages
  - Official: Tangkhul Loree tu
- Time zone: UTC+5:30 (IST)
- PIN: 795142
- Vehicle registration: MN
- Nearest city: Ukhrul Kohima
- Literacy: 65.36%
- Lok Sabha constituency: Outer Manipur
- Vidhan Sabha constituency: Chingai

Nungbi Khullen, locally called Loree, is a village north of Ukhrul in Ukhrul district of Manipur state, India. It is part of the Chingai subdivision. National Highway 150, connecting Imphal-Kohima via Ukhrul and Jessami, passes through it. About 35 kilometers from Ukhrul, it is flanked by Loree Kaju to the west, Lunghar to the south, Khamasom to the east and Kalhang to the north. Its inhabitants speak the Loree dialect of the Tibeto-Burman language family.

== Total population ==
According to 2011 census, Nungbi Khullen has 352 households with the total of 1602 people of which 809 are male and 793 are female. Of the total population, 248 were in the age group of 0–6 years. The average sex ratio of the village is 980 female to 1000 male which is lower than the state average 985. The literacy rate of the village stands at 65.36% which is lower than the state average 76.94%. Male literacy rate stands at 72.43% while female literacy rate was 58.18%.

== People and occupation ==
The village is home to people of Tangkhul Naga tribe. Majority of the inhabitants are Christians. Agriculture is the primary occupation for majority of the inhabitants. Nungbi Khullen is famous in the district for the age old earthen pottery making. One uniqueness of Nungbi pottery is the absence of potter's wheel while crafting. The clay and stone used as the raw materials for making Nungbi pottery is believed to be found only at Nungbi Khullen. In olden days, before the advent of aluminium and steel utensils, people from all over the Tangkhul community were believed to have solely depended on Nungbi pottery for their daily use. Even today, Tangkhuls nurture a belief that meat cooked in earthen Longpi pots taste better. This conviction is substantiated by the fact that most households in Ukhrul district have earthen Nungbi pots among their other kitchenwares. Pottery is the primary occupation for many of the inhabitants and some artisans have the distinction of being awarded state and national recognitions and accolades.
