= Marem =

- Village
- Location in Manipur, India Marem (India)
- Coordinates: 25.307°N 94.451°E
- Country: India
- State: Manipur
- District: Ukhrul
- Elevation: 1,663 m (5,456 ft)

Population
  - Total: 750

Languages
  - Official: Tangkhul (Marem Tui)
- Time zone: UTC+5:30 (IST)
- PIN: 795142
- Vehicle registration: MN
- Nearest city: Ukhrul Kohima
- Literacy: 88.32%
- Lok Sabha constituency: Outer Manipur
- Vidhan Sabha constituency: Chingai

Marem is a village located north of Ukhrul in Ukhrul district, Manipur state, India. The village is approximately 48 kilometers from Ukhrul. National Highway 150 Imphal-Kohima via Jessami passes through the village. The village is often in the news for the deplorable condition of the National Highway stretch that passes through the village land. Marem is one of the villages that used to make indigenous salt from salt springs and supply to other Tangkhul villages before the advent of common salt. The village is flanked by Peh in the west, Chingai in the east, Ngahui and Kalhang in the south and Chingjaroi and Namrei in the north. Locally inhabitants speak Marem dialect which belongs to the Tibeto-Burman language family.

== Total population ==
According to 2011 census, Marem has 89 households with the total of 327 people of which 157 are male and 170 are female. Of the total population, 61 were in the age group of 0–6 years. The average sex ratio of Marem village is 1083 female to 1000 male which is higher than the state average of 985. The literacy rate of the village stands at 79.32%. Male literacy rate stands at 87.60% while female literacy rate was 71.53%.

== People and occupation ==
The village is home to people of Tangkhul Naga tribe. The inhabitants of Marem are Christians and agriculture is the primary occupation. The village is well known in the district for its scenery and the various talent of the people.
