= Tusom =

- Village
- Location in Manipur, India Tusom (India)
- Coordinates: 25°25′15″N 94°34′38″E
- Country: India
- State: Manipur
- District: Ukhrul

Population
  - Total: 2,250

Languages
  - Official: Tangkhul (Tusom Tui)
- Time zone: UTC+5:30 (IST)
- PIN: 795142
- Vehicle registration: MN
- Nearest city: Ukhrul Kohima
- Literacy: 90.94%
- Lok Sabha constituency: Outer Manipur
- Vidhan Sabha constituency: Jessami
- Website: manipur.gov.in

Tusom is a generic reference to two villages located north of Ukhrul in Ukhrul district, Manipur state, India. The villages are Tusom Khullen or New Tusom and Tusom CV. The villages are partially connected by National Highway 150, Imphal-Kohima road via Jessami. Tusom is 120 kilometres (75 miles) away from Ukhrul and about 5 kilometres (3 miles) away from Indo-Myanmar border pillar number 130. Tusom is flanked by Kharasom in the west, Chingai in the south and Laivum village Myanmar in the east.

== Total population ==
As per 2011 census, Tusom Khullen has 341 households with the total of 1608 people of which 811 are male and 797 are female. Of the total population, 225 were in the age group of 0–6 years. The average sex ratio of Tusom Khullen village is 983 female to 1000 male which is lower than the state average of 985. The literacy rate of the village stands at 90.66%.

As per 2011 census, Tusom CV has 134 households with the total of 642 people of which 330 are male and 312 are female. Of the total population, 112 were in the age group of 0–6 years. The average sex ratio of Tusom Khullen village is 945 female to 1000 male which is lower than the state average of 985. The literacy rate of the village stands at 93.02%.

== Demographics ==
The village is home to people of Tangkhul Naga tribe. Majority of the inhabitants are Christians. Agriculture is the primary occupation of the inhabitants. The village was recently in news because of volcano eruption at New Tusom village and chopper like object crash in the vicinity of the village.
