= Tungou =

- Village
- Nickname: Tungou
- Location in Manipur, India Tungou (India)
- Coordinates: 25°02′17″N 94°14′40″E
- Country: India
- State: Manipur
- District: Ukhrul

Population
  - Total: 723

Languages
  - Official: Tangkhul (Tungou tui)
- Time zone: UTC+5:30 (IST)
- PIN: 795142
- Vehicle registration: MN
- Nearest city: Ukhrul Imphal
- Literacy: 81.06%
- Lok Sabha constituency: Outer Manipur
- Vidhan Sabha constituency: Chingai
- Website: manipur.gov.in

Tungou also misnomerly referred to as Ringui is a village located south of Ukhrul in Ukhrul district, Manipur state, India. The village is about 35 kilometers from Ukhrul via National Highway 150 that connects Imphal and Kohima via Ukhrul and Jessami. Tungou is flanked by Ramva in the east, Tashar in the north, Sinakeithei in the west and Lungpha in the south. Locally, the inhabitants speak Tungou tui which belongs to the Tibeto-Burman language family.

== Total population ==
According to 2011 census, Tungou has 352 households with a total of 1971 people of which 1022 are male and 949 are female. Of the total population, 283 were in the age group of 0–6 years. The average sex ratio of the village is 929 female to 1000 male which is lower than the state average of 985. The literacy rate of the village stands at 90.40% which is higher than the state average 76.94%. Male literacy rate stands at 93.35% while female literacy rate was 87.14%.

== People and occupation ==
The village is home to people of the Tangkhul Naga tribe and the majority of the inhabitants are Christians. Agriculture is the primary occupation of the inhabitants. Tungou is one of the 44 villages considered likely to be affected as a catchment area when the Mapithel multi purpose project is finally functional. The village produced the first motion pictures in Tangkhul dialect. Dr. Yaronsho Ngalung, the incumbent Autonomous District Council Chairman hails from this village.
