= Ngainga =

Ngainga Ngaimu
- Village
- Location in Manipur, India Ngainga (India)
- Coordinates: 25°08′43″N 94°19′26″E
- Country: India
- State: Manipur
- District: Ukhrul

Population
  - Total: 2,881

Languages
  - Official: Tangkhul (Meitei)
- Time zone: UTC+5:30 (IST)
- PIN: 795142
- Vehicle registration: MN
- Nearest city: Ukhrul
- Literacy: 92.22%
- Lok Sabha constituency: Outer Manipur
- Vidhan Sabha constituency: Chingai
- Website: manipur.gov.in

Ngainga also called Ngaimu is a village located west of Ukhrul in Ukhrul district, Manipur state, India. The village is approximately 17 kilometers from Ukhrul. As per 2011 census, the village has a total of 267 households with 2881 persons of which 964 are male while 917 are female. Of the total population, 323 are in the age group of 0–6 years. The average sex ratio of the village is 1015 female per 1000 male which is higher than the state's average of 930. The literacy rate of the village is 92.22%. Neighbouring villages of Ngainga are Seikhor, Tolloi, Phalee Somdal and Tuinem. Ngainga is the birthplace of Luingamla who was shot dead on 24 January 1986 by Indian army personnel for resisting their attempt to rape her.

== Religion ==
Ngainga is one of the Tangkhul villages that embraced Christianity very early. For this, the villagers got access to western education right from the coming of Christian missionaries to Ukhrul district. Majority of the inhabitants are Christians. As per 2011 census, the literacy rate of the village stood at 92.22% which is higher than the state's average of 76.94%.

== People and occupation ==
The village is home to people of Tangkhul Naga tribe. Agriculture is the primary occupation of the inhabitants. Ngainga is well known in the district for its scenic beauty.
