= Huishu =

- Village
- Location in Manipur, India Huishu (India)
- Coordinates: 25.246°N 94.552°E
- Country: India
- State: Manipur
- District: Ukhrul
- Elevation: 1,699 m (5,574 ft)

Population
  - Total: 1,018

Languages
  - Official: Tangkhul (Huishu Tui)
- Time zone: UTC+5:30 (IST)
- PIN: 795142
- Vehicle registration: MN
- Nearest city: Ukhrul Imphal
- Literacy: 87.91%
- Lok Sabha constituency: Outer Manipur
- Vidhan Sabha constituency: Chingai
- Website: manipur.gov.in

Huishu village is situated on the northeast fringe of the district headquarter, Ukhrul district, Manipur, India, and is bordered by Myanmar to the northeast, Poi village to the north, Chingai and Awang Kasom Ngahui to the northwest, Kuirei village to the west and Khamasom village to the south. Huishu is called "the green hills of the rising sun" and also "North Indo-Myanmar border corridor" of Manipur.

The village is about 64 kilometres (40 mi) from the district headquarter, Ukhrul, and about 6 kilometres (3.7 mi) from the pillar 125 on the Indo-Myanmar border. The village is partially connected by the national highway 202 Imphal-Kohima road via Jessami. The inhabitants speak Huishu dialect originated from the family of Tibeto-Burman language as well as Tangkhul, a lingua franca of the Tangkhul Naga Tribe.

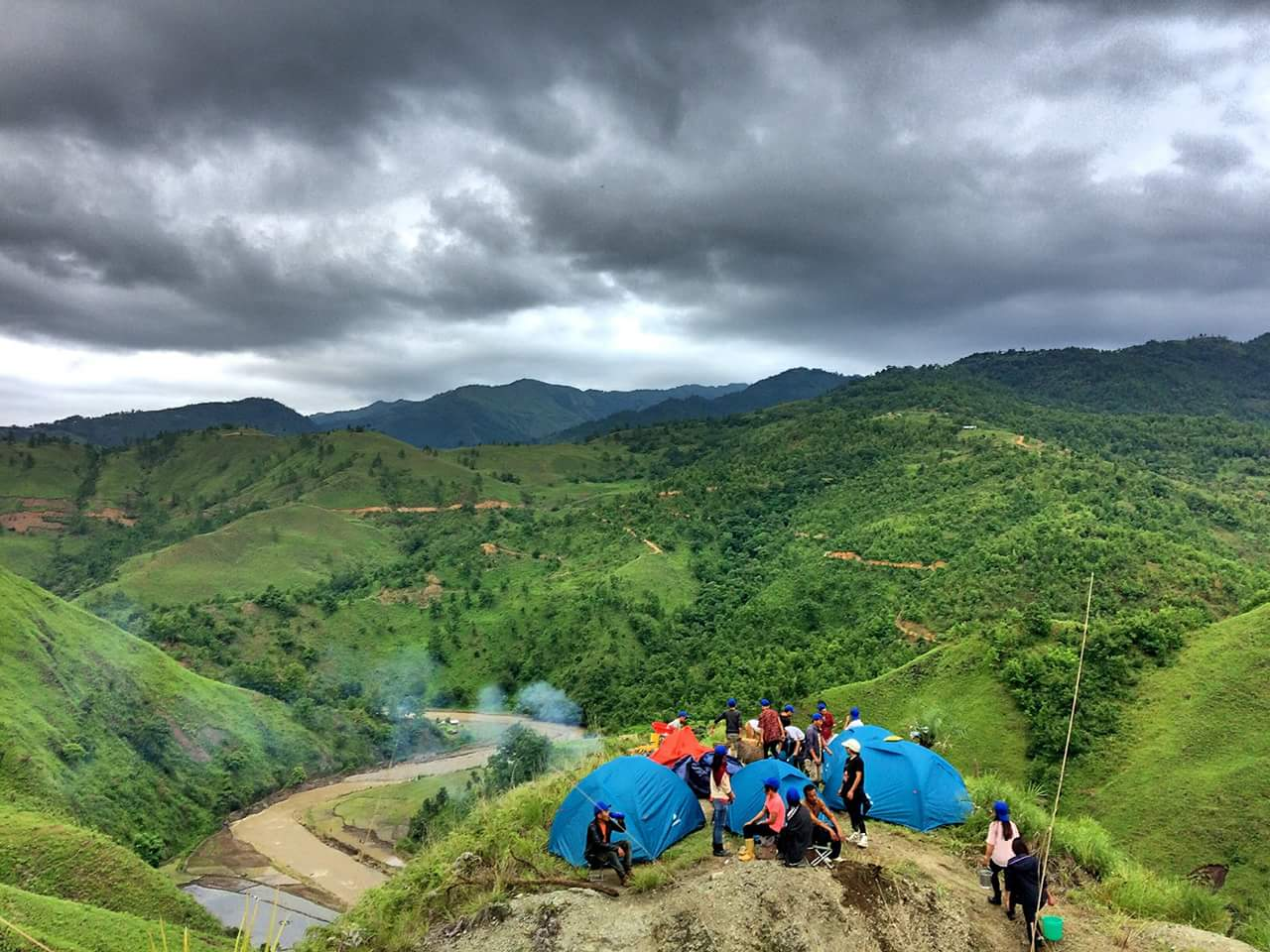
The landscape near Huishu, in Ukhrul district

The village basically comprises three mountain ranges, namely Salivi mountain in the east, Zingshan mountain in the west and the Wanchai river confluence range in the south. The great Zingshan mountain comprises two parallel ranges interspersed with Wangchai river confluence in the south extending up to Larang range bordering Khamasom village in the south through which immediately connects to Salivi mountain range in the east and Loli range in the north which directly connects Huishu-Poi boundary through a narrow stream Narukhu extending to Salivi mountain.

The land has rich water and forest resources and is a fertile area. Rambu hill, Ouhao hill, Zingshan mountain and Thurekakacho hill located on the right bank of the Huishu river are the main tourists destinations.

The climate may be broadly described as sub-tropical monsoon type. The coldest months are December and January, when temperatures average around 10-15C (50-59F) while the hottest months are April and May.

== Population ==
At the 2011 census, Huishu had 201 households with a population of 1,018 (519 male, 499 female). 133 were in the age group 0–6 years. The sex ratio was 961 females to 1,000 males, lower than the state average of 985. The literacy rate was 87.91%. Male literacy was 93.36% and female 82.22%.

The village is home to people of the Tangkhul Naga tribe. Most inhabitants are Christians. Agriculture is the primary occupation.

== Conflict ==
Being close to the porous international boundary with Myanmar, the village was the strategic transit point for militant groups to move between India and Myanmmar. Before the signing of the cease-fire agreement between the NSCN (IM) and the Government of India in 1997, the village was burned down by the Indian Army in retaliation for attacks made on them by the militants on several occasions, the most devastating being on 11 March 1996 when the whole village, including the granaries, was burnt to the ground by the Indian army after its camp was annihilated by the NSCN (IM). Some villagers were also reportedly shot dead, both in custody and in fake encounters, and many were tortured.
