= Lungpha =

Lungpha Luphuro
- Village
- Location in Manipur, India Lungpha (India)
- Coordinates: 24°56′18″N 94°15′07″E
- Country: India
- State: Manipur
- District: Ukhrul

Population
  - Total: 1,110

Languages
  - Official: Tangkhul (Lungpha tui)
- Time zone: UTC+5:30 (IST)
- PIN: 795145
- Vehicle registration: MN
- Nearest city: Ukhrul Imphal
- Literacy: 92.86%
- Lok Sabha constituency: Outer Manipur
- Vidhan Sabha constituency: Ukhrul
- Website: manipur.gov.in

Lungpha is a village located south of Ukhrul in Ukhrul district, Manipur state, India. The village is about 15 kilometers from Ukhrul via National Highway 150 that connects Imphal and Kohima via Ukhrul and Jessami. Lungpha is flanked by Ramva in the north, Tungou in the west, Litan in the south and Shangshak in the east. Locally, the inhabitants speak Lungpha tui which belongs to the Tibeto-Burman language family.

== Total population ==
According to 2011 census, Lungpha has 150 households with the total of 1110 people of which 599 are male and 501 are female. Of the total population, 68 were in the age group of 0–6 years. The average sex ratio of the village is 900 female to 1000 male which is lower than the state average of 985. The literacy rate of the village stands at 92.86% which is higher than the state average 76.94%. Male literacy rate stands at 95.16% while female literacy rate was 90.33%.

== People and occupation ==
The village is home to people of Tangkhul Naga tribe. Majority of the inhabitants are Christians. Agriculture is the primary occupation of the inhabitants. Lungpha is one of the 44 villages considered likely to be affected as a catchment area when the Mapithel multi purpose project is finally functional. There was a great uproar in 2012 when a couple were shot dead in the village by suspected NSCN (IM) cadres.
