= Longpi =

Longpi Lori, Nungbi
- town
- Location in Manipur, India Longpi (India)
- Coordinates: 25°12′20″N 94°26′52″E
- Country: India
- State: Manipur
- District: Ukhrul

Population
  - Total: 8,000

Languages
  - Official: Meiteilon (Manipuri)
- Time zone: UTC+5:30 (IST)
- PIN: 795142
- Vehicle registration: MN
- Nearest city: Ukhrul
- Literacy: 75%
- Lok Sabha constituency: Outer Manipur
- Vidhan Sabha constituency: Chingai
- Website: manipur.gov.in

Longpi (pronounced "long-pee") is a general reference to two villages (Longpi Kajui and Longpi Khullen) in the Ukhrul District of the Indian state of Manipur. Longpi is about 37 kilometres (23 mi) north of Ukhrul, connected by National Highway 202 (Imphal–Kohima via Ukhrul and Jessami Highway). The two villages together have a population of over 8,000.

Longpi is flanked by Nungbi Khullen in the east Sihai in the southeast, Lunghar in the south, Phungcham, Paorei, Peh in the west and Kalhang in the North.

== Origin ==
The name 'Longpi' means 'group lodge' in Tangkhul dialect. Local myths suggests that the name was coined based on the strategic location of the village. It is said that the villages serve as transit point for travelers in olden days. Before the introduction of common salt, people from all over Tangkhul villages goes to Kalhang, Marem and Maremphung to fetch salt water and baked salt. It was during these travels that people stop over at Longpi for the nights and were treated as guests by the longpian. The place thus, came to be known as 'group lodge' or Longpi. Recently, the natives indigenised their village name by referring themselves as "Loree" which means a large collection of groups or clans. Longpi is home to about 22 clans at present. This fact validates the claim of the inhabitants calling themselves as 'Loree '. Not many villages among the Tangkhul Naga have large numbers of clans like Longpi. It is believed that many clans of the Tangkhul Naga traced their migration point from these villages especially the western Tangkhuls.

The villages used to be under a single chief. The village got bifurcated with almost half of the populace moving further east somewhere in the early eighteenth century. The main reason for the mass migration could be to cultivate more of the inherited land that lies further east.

== Longpi Pottery ==
Longpi is famous for age old pottery making locally called Longpi Ham. It is believed that Longpi ham used to be the main cooking utensil among the Tangkhuls before the advent of aluminum pots. Longpi ham as of today has attained national and international popularity. Longpi pottery is one unique art where the potters do not use the potter's wheel.

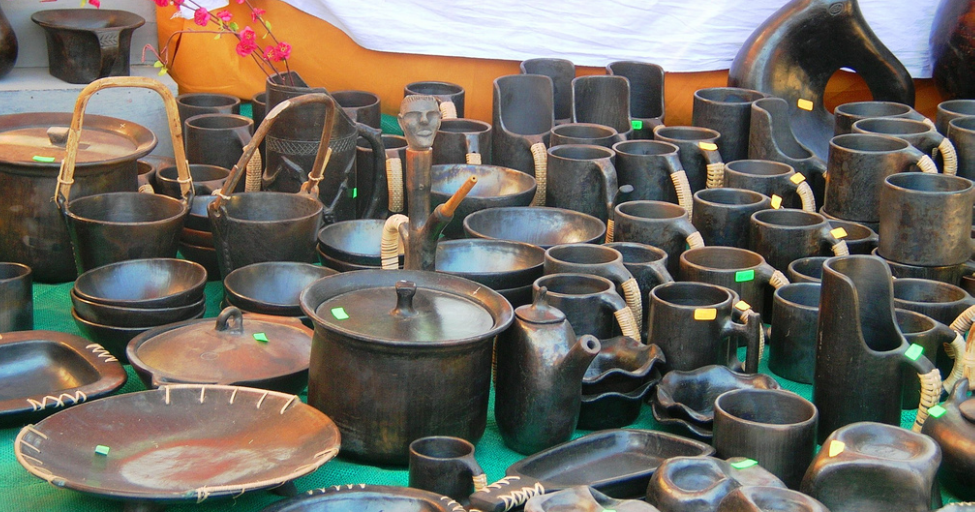
Longpi Pottery

Longpi ham is made from a mixed paste of ground black serpentinite stone and a special brown clay. As claimed by the locals, the clay is native to only Longpi village. After the pots are shaped, polished and sun dried they are heated in a bonfire and thereafter polished with a special tree leaf locally called Chiron ni. The black color of Longpi ham is a result of polishing the heated earthen pots with the tree leaf. Pottery is the secondary occupation of the populace and is the main source of income for the artisans.

== People ==
Agriculture is the primary occupation of the people. 99 percent of the population are Christians. Longpi has three high schools, Holy Spirit School, Raphei High School and Worrin School. Raphei High School is one of the oldest Government high schools in Ukhrul district. Holy Spirit High School is run by the Catholic parish and Worrin High School is run by the Baptist Mission of North Tangkhul region. Literacy rate of Longpi is 75%.

== Festivals ==
Longpi is one among the few villages within the Tangkhul tribe that still celebrate the Seed Sowing festival (Luira/Luita Phanit) in strict adherence to indigenous and traditional rituals. The main Luira cuisine of Longpi is pork cooked in large Longpi ham in moderate temperature overnight with much locally produced chilli powder. Local beer and local wine are also served as part of the Luira menu. The specially cooked pork pieces of the festival are normally the size of human palm. Guests during the festival are invited to tour the village and partake in the tasting of dishes and wine placed outside every house in the village. The festival is a major tourist attraction celebrated in the month of January.

== Vegetation ==
Longpi is home to various species of both common and rare flora and fauna. Rice is the main crop and corn, potato, cabbage, pulses are grown as cash crops.
