= Sihai, Manipur =

Sihai Saanhee
- village
- Location in Manipur, India Sihai (India)
- Coordinates: 25°10′00″N 94°29′50″E
- Country: India
- State: Manipur
- District: Ukhrul

Population
  - Total: 1,239

Languages
  - Official: Tangkhul (Sihai Tui)
- Time zone: UTC+5:30 (IST)
- PIN: 795142
- Vehicle registration: MN
- Nearest city: Ukhrul
- Literacy: 64%
- Lok Sabha constituency: Outer Manipur
- Vidhan Sabha constituency: Ukhrul
- Website: manipur.gov.in

Sihai (pronounced as "SI-HAI") is a general reference to a group of villages (settlements: Sihai Khullen, Sihai Khunou and Sihai Kahaophung) in the north of Ukhrul District headquarters in Manipur. Sihai Khullen, the nearest from Ukhrul is about 37 kilometers from Ukhrul, connected partially by National Highway 150 (Imphal-Kohima via Ukhrul and Jessami Highway).

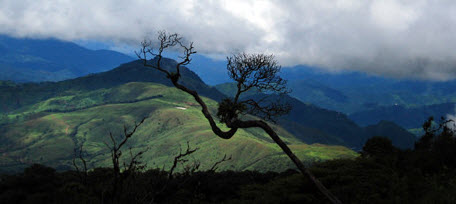
View of Sihai Phangrei from Shirui Peak

Sihai Khullen is about 7 miles from Zero Point, a small hamlet at the foothill of Sihai Phangrei. Sihai phangrei is a long flat hill range, one of the favorite picnic spots in Ukhrul district. The hill range joins with the Shirui Peak/Shirui Kashong, home of the famous flower Shirui Lily (Lilium mackliniae)

Neighboring villages of the settlements are Khamasom, Longpi, Lunghar, Shirui, Mapum and Zingsui.

== Population ==
According to 2011 census, Sihai Khullen has 188 households with the total of 867 people of which 448 are male and 419 are female. Of the total population, 145 were in the age group of 0–6 years. The average sex ratio of the village is 938 female to 1000 male which is lower than the state average 985. The literacy rate of the village stands at 72.58% which is lower than the state average 76.94%. Male literacy rate stands at 77.42% while female literacy rate was 67.43%.

According to 2011 census, Sihai Khunou has 80 households with the total of 372 people of which 194 are male and 178 are female. Of the total population, 73 were in the age group of 0–6 years. The average sex ratio of the village is 918 female to 1000 male which is lower than the state average 985. The literacy rate of the village stands at 51.51% which is lower than the state average 76.94%. Male literacy rate stands at 58.13% while female literacy rate was 43.88%.

== History ==
The original name of the settlement is 'Saanhee' meaning 'cow's gem' in the local dialect and 'Sei-hai' in Tangkhul dialect, the common vernacular of the Tangkhul Naga tribe.'The settlement became better known as Sihai as outsiders find it hard to call the settlement by the local name. However, the neighboring villages refer to the settlements as Cow's Jewel in their respective dialects.

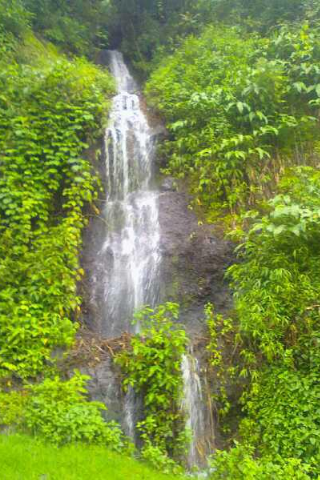
Sihai Khullen Waterfall

The origin of the name is traced back to the time of migration and settlement based on a legend believed by the settlers. According to the legend, a cow was slaughtered as sacrifice to commemorate the occasion of the settlement and that a jewel was found in the cow's bowel.

The jewel found inside the cow as said by the settlers was given away to the daughter of the village chief as a marriage gift who married the son of Phungcham Chief. Phungchamis a village approximately 35 kilometers north of Ukhrul. The jewel till then was in the custody of the village chief and his predecessors for several generations.

After staying together in a single location for several centuries, the original settlement got bifurcated into two, with almost half of the settlers moving further east in the 19th century. The main reason for the relocation was to occupy and cultivate more of the inherited fertile arable land that lies beyond the river. The old settlement was named Sihai Khullen/Phungcham (old settlement) and the new settlement was named Sihai Khunou/Phungdhar (new settlement).

Sihai Khunou later got bifurcated into Sihai Khunou and Sihai Kahaophung. Until recently the three settlements were under one chief.

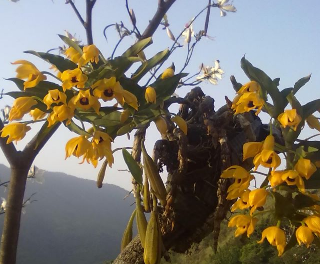
Orchid in full bloom

== People and Occupation ==
Agriculture is the main occupation of the settlers. The main crops grown in these settlements are rice, corn, and pulses of many varieties. Sihai Khullen is well known in Ukhrul district for cabbage cultivation and its large scale export. Sihai in general is also famous for it traditional bamboo handicrafts. Bamboo products from the village include various types of baskets locally called sopkai, pengkai, luk, ngala shung, kashai, shung, etc. Sihai is also famous in the district for uniqueness of the folk songs and folk dance. 99.9% of the population are Christians. Literacy rate of the settlements is 64%.

== Vegetation ==
The settlements as a whole has a rich reserve of both rare and common flora and fauna. The place is famous for the rich variety of rhododendrons that bloom in the spring season. During April and May one can see the whole spring beds covered with white and red rhododendrons, locally called as Anyii-van/Ngayawon and Koktaa-van/Kokluiwon. Sihai also is home to various varieties of orchids that blooms round the year. Fruits grown in Sihai are peach, plum, grapes, passion fruit, pear, and apple.
