= Kalhang =

- Village
- Nickname: Kansang
- Location in Manipur, India Kalhang (India)
- Coordinates: 25°14′23″N 94°27′09″E
- Country: India
- State: Manipur
- District: Ukhrul

Population
  - Total: 1,181

Languages
  - Official: Tangkhul (Kansang tu)
- Time zone: UTC+5:30 (IST)
- PIN: 795142
- Vehicle registration: MN
- Nearest city: Ukhrul Kohima
- Literacy: 41.61%
- Lok Sabha constituency: Outer Manipur
- Vidhan Sabha constituency: Chingai
- Website: manipur.gov.in

Kalhang is a village located north of Ukhrul in Ukhrul district, Manipur state, India. The village is approximately 39 kilometers from Ukhrul. National Highway 150 Imphal-Kohima via Jessami passes through the village. Kalhang is one of the villages that used to make indigenous salt from natural salt springs and supply to other Tangkhul villages before the introduction of common salt. The village is flanked by Phungcham and Peh in the west, Khamasom in the east, Longpi in the south and Kuirei in the North. Locally inhabitants speak Kansang dialect which belongs to the Tibeto-Burman language family.

== Total population ==
According to 2011 census, Kalhang has 215 households with the total of 1,181 people of which 599 are male and 582 are female. Of the total population, 222 were in the age group of 0–6 years. The average sex ratio of Kalhang village is 972 female to 1000 male which is lower than the state average of 985. The literacy rate of the village stands at 41.61%. Male literacy rate stands at 44.44% while female literacy rate was 38.69%.

== People and occupation ==
The village is home to people of Tangkhul Naga tribe. Majority of the inhabitants are Christians. Agriculture is the primary occupation of the inhabitants. Kalhang is also famous for pork cuisine prepared mainly during Luira festival, seed sowing festival of the Tangkhuls. The village has a history of bearing inhuman treatment under the Indian army during insurgency operations.
