= Khashim Vashum =

Indian politician

Minister for Animal husbandry & Veterinary and Transport department Government of Manipur
- Incumbent
- Assumed office 2022

Member of the Manipur Legislative Assembly
- Incumbent
- Assumed office 2017
- Preceded by: MK Preshow Shimray
- Constituency: Chingai

Personal details
- Born: 20 January 1964 (age 62) Jessami, Manipur
- Party: Naga People's Front
- Education: Zakir Husain Delhi College; Delhi University
- Profession: Social Worker

Khashim Vashum is an Indian politician from Manipur. He was elected to the Manipur Legislative Assembly from Chingai in 2017 and 2022 Manipur Legislative Assembly election as a member of Naga People's Front. He then served as Cabinet Minister for Animal husbandry & Veterinary and Transport department in Second N. Biren Singh ministry. He was born in a Naga family.
