= Lamlang, Ukhrul =

Lamlang
- Village
- Location in Manipur, India Lamlang (India)
- Coordinates: 25°05′03″N 94°16′57″E
- Country: India
- State: Manipur
- District: Ukhrul

Population
  - Total: 964

Languages
  - Official: Tangkhul Lamlang Tou
- Time zone: UTC+5:30 (IST)
- PIN: 795142
- Vehicle registration: MN
- Nearest city: Ukhrul Imphal
- Literacy: 90.06%
- Lok Sabha constituency: Outer Manipur
- Vidhan Sabha constituency: Ukhrul
- Website: manipur.gov.in

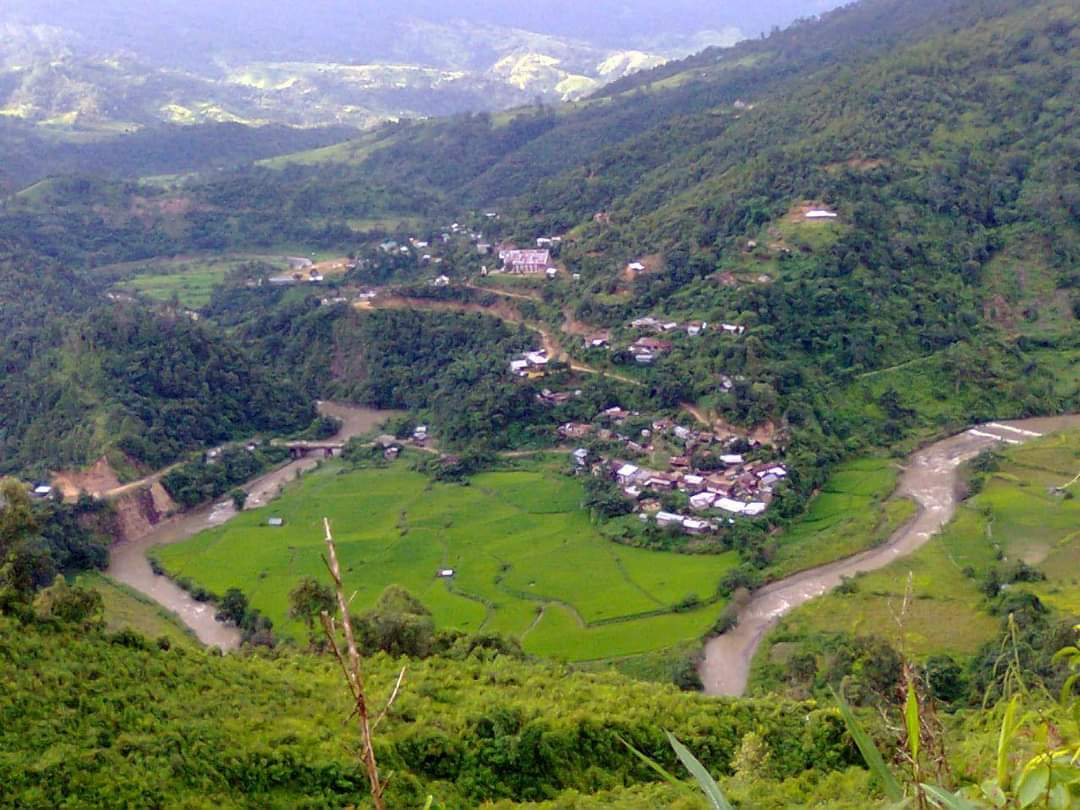
Lamlang Gate

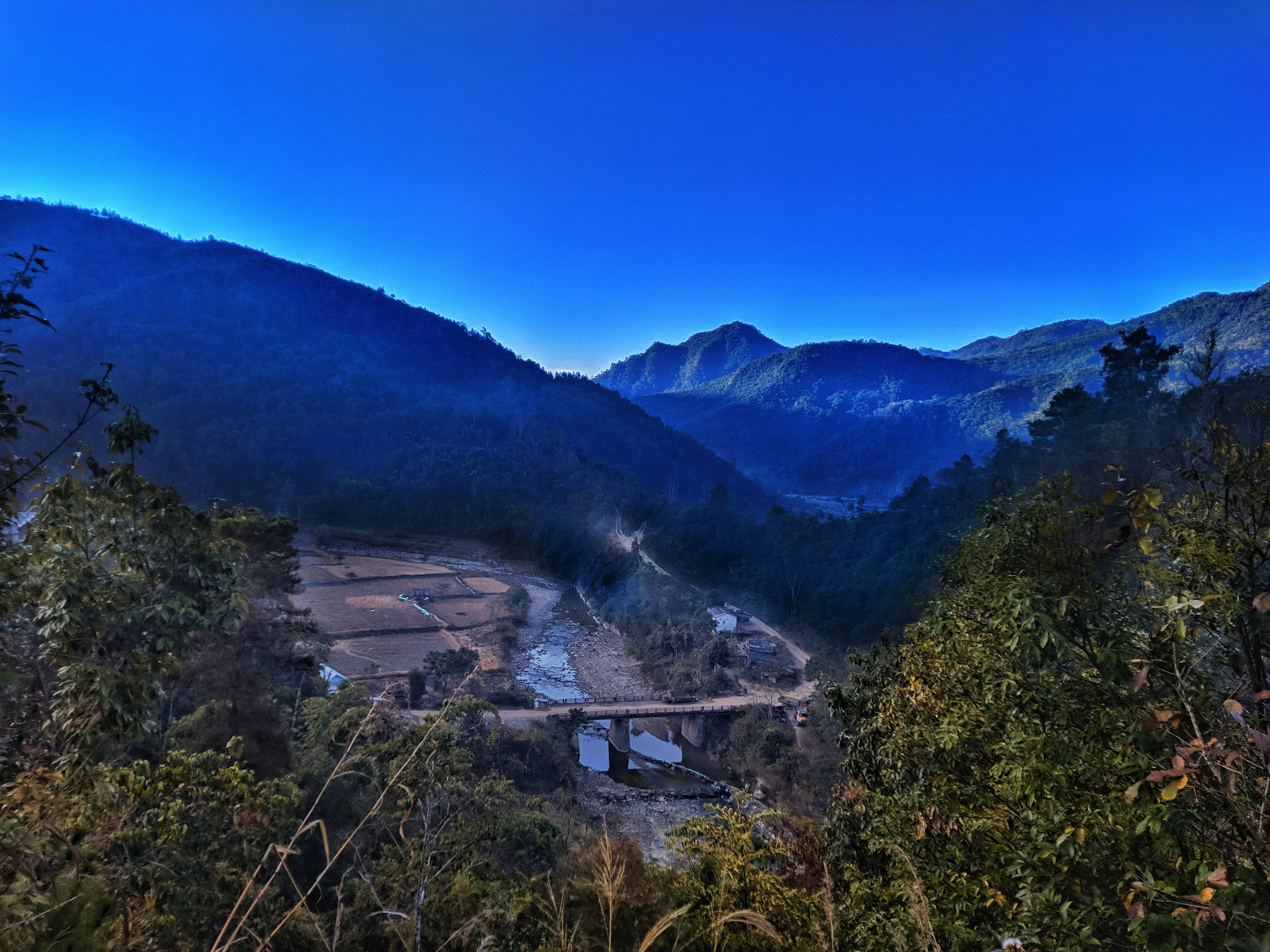
Bridge

Lamlang also popularly referred as Lamlang Gate is a village located west of Ukhrul in Ukhrul district, Manipur state, India. The village falls under Ukhrul sub division. The old Imphal-Ukhrul road passes through the village and is about 19 kilometers from Ukhrul. Lamlang is flanked by Seikhor in the north, Pharung in the east, Tashar in the south and Sirarakhong in the west. Locally, the inhabitants speak Lamlang dialect that belongs to the Tibeto-Burman language family.

== Total population ==
According to 2011 census, Lamlang has 191 households with the total of 964 people of which 499 are male and 465 are female. Of the total population, 129 were in the age group of 0–6 years. The average sex ratio of the village is 932 female to 1000 male which is lower than the state average of 985. The literacy rate of the village stands at 90.06% which is higher than the state average 76.94%. Male literacy rate stands at 92.59% while female literacy rate was 87.34%.

== People and occupation ==
The village is home to people of Tangkhul Naga tribe. Majority of the inhabitants are Christians. Agriculture is the primary occupation of the inhabitants. Seikhor is one of the 44 villages in Ukhrul district that would be affected being a catchment area when the Mapithel Dam is finally completed and fully functional.
