= Champhung =

Champhung Aphung
- village
- Nickname: Aphung
- Location in Manipur, India Champhung (India)
- Coordinates: 25°09′03.9″N 94°13′36.7″E
- Country: India
- State: Manipur
- District: Ukhrul

Population
  - Total: 782

Languages
  - Official: Tangkhul (Champhung tui)
- Time zone: UTC+5:30 (IST)
- PIN: 795142
- Vehicle registration: MN
- Nearest city: Ukhrul
- Literacy: 81.12%
- Lok Sabha constituency: Outer Manipur
- Vidhan Sabha constituency: 45 - Chingai
- Website: manipur.gov.in

Champhung is a village located in the extreme west of Ukhrul district, Manipur, India. The village is connected by an inter-village road via Makuikong and is about 30 kilometers from the district headquarters and 4 kilometers from Lungchong Maiphei - L.M Block. Champhung is flanked by Tora in the north, Somdal, Phalee and Teinem in the east, Leisan in the south-west and Senapati district in the west.

== Population ==
According to the 2011 census, Champhung has 152 households with a total of 782 people of whom 408 are male and 374 are female. Of the total population, 88 were aged 0–6 years. The average sex ratio of the village is 917 females to 1,000 males, lower than the state average of 985. The literacy rate of the village stands at 81.12%, higher than the state average of 76.94%. The male literacy rate was 82.42% while the female literacy rate was 79.70%.

== People and occupation ==
Agriculture is the main occupation of the population. The main crops grown in the village are rice, corn, and pulses of many varieties. Champhung is well known in the Ukhrul district for its Potato, Mango, Guava, and Chili cultivation. Most of the inhabitants are Christians.

Champhung Ramhon village was declared a model village in Ukhrul district, Manipur, under the SAGY Scheme in 2021.

== Religion and educational institutions ==
Aphung and Champhung is one of the Tangkhul villages that embraced Christianity very early. For this, the villagers got access to Western education right from the coming of Christian missionaries to the Ukhrul district. According to the 2011 census, the literacy rate of the village was 81.12%, which is higher than the state's average of 76.94%.

The village is home to people of the Tangkhul Naga tribe who speak the Tangkhul language with a village dialect that is unique among Tangkhul dialects. Agriculture is the primary occupation of the inhabitants. Rice, maize, potato, mango, and cabbage are some of the main crops grown in this village. The traditional farming system has been an integral part of this village's livelihood since time immemorial, and accordingly, it is closely interwoven with the intricate fabric of the society in terms of culture, religion, and economy. The farming system covers wet paddy cultivation, slash and burn, and other allied agricultural activities comprising forest gathering, artisanship, crop festivals, kitchen gardening, domestication of birds and animals, fisheries, and rearing of edible insects. Rearing edible six-legged insects like Asian giant hornets, honey bees, green grasshoppers, etc.

Most of these practices are social and community-based activities, and their importance is expressed in their various cultures. They are ancient practices, and the production system is generally trivial, merely a paltry self-sufficient to safeguard the basic survival level. The agriculture system is stagnated, proved by the unremitting abject poverty of the village life. Plagued with malnutrition, ill health, and lack of basic amenities like telecommunications, transport, and marketing. However, in recent years, there has been a tremendous improvement in the rearing of domestic animals and birds, especially fishery, producing approximately 1000 kilogram of fish (common carp and other local varieties) per year. It is one of the villages that upholds the afforestation program with Government agencies with tremendous success and has planted the highest number of trees thus far.

Artisanship is one of this village's old traditional practices, including weaving, blacksmithing, bamboo weaving, stone and wood carving works, etc. Artisanship constitutes one of the essential scales of their development index in the past.

== Culture ==
Luira Phanit, or the seed-sowing festival, is perhaps still one of the biggest traditional festivals of the Tangkhuls Naga, celebrated yearly with great joy. The festival celebrated in every Tangkhul village at the beginning of the year, though with some modifications now (the date of celebration differs from village to village), precisely to herald the coming of a new year and to commemorate the beginning of sowing the first seed for the coming year. This is the leading agricultural festival of the year, and its celebration spread over about seven days in the olden days though the celebration does not extend that much longer nowadays.

Since the advent of Christianity in 1923 and in the years that followed, an understanding between the Christians and the non-Christians of this village was brought about regarding the fixation of the date for its celebration wherein 15 March of every year was exclusively set aside for this festival of which, hitherto it was usually celebrated a little earlier or later than this as per the climate and other factors. It is almost a week-long celebration, and even now, the intensity of the celebration is quite immense. Some of the competition items during the festival include a folk song (this includes Yarra Laa, Champhung yaozala laa and khunrapun mazapun Laa, etc.), folk dance, Luita Laa, high jump, long jump, wrestling, bamboo climbing, carrying rice pounding stick on the back, tug of war, trumpet, flute, violin, guitar drama, soccer, volleyball and many more. Tug of war is one showpiece of an event that captivates the hearts of the audience with equal numbers of men and women/localities wise/ strongest among youths, etc. at each end of the rope (called thingneir or lauthanre) trying to pull with their utmost strength.

The dying giant may not figuratively represent a human giant, but it is about the practice tradition of carrying a giant load of paddy, approximately 15–20 tins of unprocessed paddy rice is a widespread age-old practice among Tangkhul Nagas during harvest time in the village situated in the west of Ukhrul district in Manipur. Lengvei Kaphung is a challenge for all men of the town. A giant load of paddy tightly packed in traditional, unique, hand-weaved shawls. Handicrafts using bamboo slivers is another skill hand weaved into different shapes and sizes of baskets for other household purposes like containers, carpets, and decorations.
