= Tashar, Ukhrul =

Tushen
- Village
- Nickname: Tushen
- Location in Manipur, India Tushen (India)
- Coordinates: 25°03′13″N 94°17′54″E
- Country: India
- State: Manipur
- District: Ukhrul

Population
  - Total: 3,446

Languages
  - Official: Tangkhul (Tushen tui)
- Time zone: UTC+5:30 (IST)
- PIN: 795142
- Vehicle registration: MN
- Nearest city: Ukhrul Imphal
- Literacy: 87.72%
- Lok Sabha constituency: Outer Manipur
- Vidhan Sabha constituency: Ukhrul
- Website: manipur.gov.in

Tushen, also known as Tushar, is a generic reference to two villages viz. Tashar and Tushen Chanhong located south-west of Ukhrul in Ukhrul district, Manipur state, India. The village is about 18 kilometers from Ukhrul via National Highway that connects Imphal and Kohima via Ukhrul and Jessami. Tushen is flanked by Pharung in the north, Ramva in the south, Shangshak in the east and Sirarakhong in the West. Locally, the inhabitants speak Tushen tui which belongs to the Tibeto-Burman language family.

== Total population ==
According to 2011 census, Tashar has 345 households with the total of 2098 people of which 1092 are male and 1006 are female. Of the total population, 300 were in the age group of 0–6 years. The average sex ratio of the village is 900 female to 1000 male which is lower than the state average of 985. The literacy rate of the village stands at 87.72%. Male literacy rate stands at 92.76% while female literacy rate was 82.14%.

The total number of households of Tushen Chanhong according to 2011 census is 165 with the total of 784 people of which 402 are male and 382 are female. Of the total population, 138 were in the age group of 0–6 years. The average sex ratio of the village is 798 female to 1000 male which is lower than the state average of 985. The literacy rate of the village stands at 87.72%. Male literacy rate stands at 92.94% while female literacy rate was 75.52%.

== People and occupation ==
The village is home to people of Tangkhul Naga tribe. Majority of the inhabitants are Christians. Agriculture is the primary occupation of the inhabitants. Tushen is one of the 44 villages considered likely to be affected as a catchment area when the Mapithel multi purpose project is finally functional.
