= Yengtem =

Yengtem Yidah
- Village
- Location in Manipur, India Yengtem (India)
- Coordinates: 24°58′57″N 94°26′11″E
- Country: India
- State: Manipur
- District: Ukhrul

Government
  - Type: Panchayati raj (India)
  - Body: Gram panchayat

Population
  - Total: 152

Languages
  - Official: Tangkhul (Yengtem tui)
- Time zone: UTC+5:30 (IST)
- PIN: 795142
- Vehicle registration: MN
- Nearest city: Ukhrul Imphal
- Literacy: 94.57%
- Lok Sabha constituency: Outer Manipur
- Vidhan Sabha constituency: Phungyar

Yengtem is a village located south of Ukhrul in Ukhrul district, Manipur state, India. The village is about 40 kilometers from Ukhrul and is partially connected by National Highway 150 that connects Imphal and Kohima via Ukhrul and Jessami and Kamjong-Imphal state highway. The village is flanked by Gamnom in the north, Apong village in the south, Maku in the east and Shangshak in the west. Yengtem is a major and strategic junction for the neighboring remote village as the state highway and Inter Village Roads (IVR) converges in the vicinity of the village. Locally, the inhabitants speak Yengtem tui which belongs to the Tibeto-Burman language family.

== Total population ==
According to 2011 census, Yengtem has 31 households with the total of 152 people of which 82 are male and 70 are female. Of the total population, 23 were in the age group of 0–6 years. The average sex ratio of the village is 854 female to 1000 male which is lower than the state average of 985. The literacy rate of the village stands at 94.57% which is higher than the state average 76.94%. Male literacy rate stands at 98.51% while female literacy rate was 90.32%.

== People and occupation ==
The village is home to people of Tangkhul Naga tribe. Majority of the inhabitants are Christians. Agriculture is the primary occupation of the inhabitants. The village was recently in news when large tracts of terrace paddy fields were washed away due to torrential rainfall.
