= Tanrui =

- village
- Nickname: Leisan
- Location in Manipur, India Tanrui (India)
- Coordinates: 25°08′21″N 94°10′08″E
- Country: India
- State: Manipur
- District: Ukhrul

Population
  - Total: 1,007

Languages
  - Official: Tangkhul (Tanrui tui)
- Time zone: UTC+5:30 (IST)
- PIN: 795142
- Vehicle registration: MN
- Nearest city: Ukhrul
- Literacy: 85.63%
- Lok Sabha constituency: Outer Manipur
- Vidhan Sabha constituency: Ukhrul
- Website: manipur.gov.in

Tanrui is a village located extreme west of Ukhrul district, Manipur. The village is connected by an inter village road and is about 45 kilometers from the district headquarters. Tanrui is flanked by Tuinem in the east, Zingshong in the north Senapati district in the west and Sinakeithei in the south. The inhabitants talk Tanrui dialect which belongs to the Tibeto-Burman language family.

== Population ==
According to 2011 census, Tanrui has 202 households with the total of 1007 people of which 508 are male and 499 are female. Of the total population, 144 were in the age group of 0–6 years. The average sex ratio of the village is 982 female to 1000 male which is lower than the state average 985. The literacy rate of the village stands at 85.63% which is higher than the state average 76.94%. Male literacy rate stands at 89.75% while female literacy rate was 81.37%.

== People and Occupation ==
Agriculture is the main occupation of the settlers. The main crops grown in the village are rice, corn, and pulses of many varieties. Tanrui is well known in Ukhrul district for potato and chilli cultivation. The village also is home to various flora and fauna. Majority of the inhabitants are Christians.
