= Rungsung Suisa =

Indian politician

Rungsung Suisa (4 March 1907 – 17 April 1971) was an Indian politician from Somdal, Ukhrul district. Suisa was one of the key figures in the movement to unite Naga-populated areas in Manipur with the Naga Hills (Nagaland). He was popularly known as 'Uncle Suisa'.

== Early life ==
Rungsung Suisa belonged to the Tangkhul Naga tribe. He was the son of Rungsung Luithui. He hailed from Somdal, Ukhrul district. He studied at the Jorhat Christian High School. He was amongst the first youths of the Manipur hill people to obtain matriculate education.

== Political life ==
Suisa was one of five hill leaders named by the President Manipur State Darbar to participate in the Constitution-Making Committee in 1946. However, Suisa and the other hill leaders did not attend the first session of the committee. On 13 August 1947 he chaired a meeting of hill leaders, at which the assembled demanded that the hill peoples should have the right to secede from Manipur after a five-year period. However, these demands were not heeded by the committee, and in the new constitution the administration of the hill areas was placed under the control of the Maharaja. In June 1948 he was elected unopposed to the Manipur State Assembly.

In 1949 he visited Burma, and came into contact with the Communist Party of Burma. His experience in Burma radicalized his political approach, taking a more revolutionary stance in local politics upon his return. He became a member of the Manipur Electoral College in 1951.

Suisa was elected to the Lok Sabha (lower house of the parliament of India) in the 1957 general election. He contested as the Indian National Congress candidate in Outer Manipur constituency, obtaining 21,316 votes (26.24% of the votes in the constituency). In parliament, he was represented in various committees. The Manipur Naga Council boycotted the 1962 general election and Suisa was one of the Naga leaders that was detained at Dum Dum for about a year.

Suisa was assistant to the vice president of the Naga National Council 1964–1966. In October 1966, following the deadlock in the peace talks, he presented a proposal to solve the Indo-Naga conflict through confederation, with shared responsibilities between India and Nagaland on foreign and military affairs, but full Naga sovereignty on internal affairs. He sought to mediate between the Indian government and the Naga leaders. Allegedly, Indira Gandhi was open to accept Suisa's proposal. However, the NNC opposed these moves and did not accept his proposal, as it went against their demand of complete independence. Suisa had travelled to London together with Vizol Angami in June 1967 to present the proposal to Zapu Phizo but he rebuffed it.

== Death ==
He died on 17 April 1971.
