= Huining =

Huining may refer to:

- Huining County (会宁县), county in Gansu, China
- Huining Prefecture (會寧府), former prefecture in the Shangjing region of Manchuria, location of the early capital of the Jin (Jurchen) Dynasty
- Halang, Ukhrul, or Huining, a village in Manipur, India
- Luo Huining (born 1954), Chinese politician and senior regional official
