= Sihai =

Sihai may refer to:

- Four Seas, the four bodies of water that metaphorically made up the boundaries of ancient China
- Sihai, Beijing, a town in Beijing
- Sihai, Manipur, a village in Ukhrul district of India
- Only Fools Rush In, a 2022 film also known as Sihai
