= Wahong =

- Village
- Location in Manipur, India Wahong (India)
- Coordinates: 25°29′09″N 94°33′42″E
- Country: India
- State: Manipur
- District: Ukhrul

Population
  - Total: 537

Languages
  - Official: Tangkhul (Wahongtui)
- Time zone: UTC+5:30 (IST)
- PIN: 795142
- Vehicle registration: MN
- Nearest city: Ukhrul Kohima
- Literacy: 76.94%
- Lok Sabha constituency: Outer Manipur
- Vidhan Sabha constituency: Chingai
- Website: manipur.gov.in

Wahong is a small village located north of Ukhrul in Ukhrul district, Manipur state, India. The village partially connected by National Highway 150, Imphal-Kohima road via Jessami. The village is 130 kilometers away from Ukhrul and about 10 kilometers away from Indo-Myanmar border pillar number 130. Wahong is flanked by Kharasom in the west, Tusom in the south and Nagaland in the east and north.

== Total population ==
As per 2011 census, Wahong has 148 households with the total of 537 people of which 275 are male and 262 are female. Of the total population, 114 were in the age group of 0–6 years. The average sex ratio of Wahong village is 953 female to 1000 male which is lower than the state average of 985. The literacy rate of the village stands at 76.94%.

== People and occupation ==
The village is home to people of Tangkhul Naga tribe. Majority of the inhabitants are Christians. Agriculture is the primary occupation of the inhabitants. The village is known in the district for its scenery. In 2015, the village was in the news for the possibility of volcano eruption when some of the villagers discovered a crater like formation 3 kilometers away from the village. It was found that ash and smoke were scattered in a radius of 10 meters.
