= Phalee =

Phalee Phadang
- Village
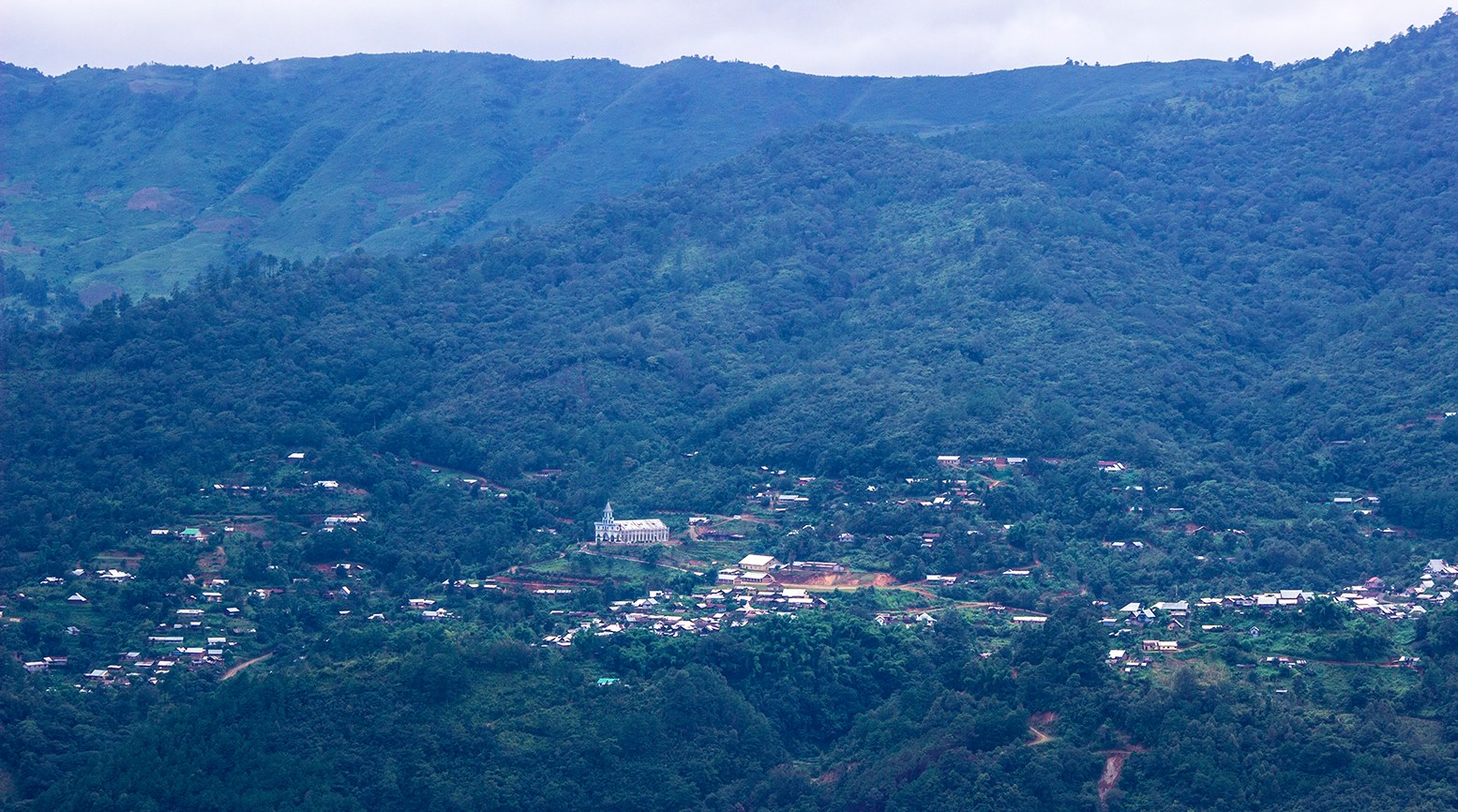

- Location in Manipur, India Phalee (India)
- Coordinates: 25°08′33″N 94°17′02″E
- Country: India
- State: Manipur
- District: Ukhrul
- Elevation: 1,533.144 m (5,030.00 ft)

Population
  - Total: 3,742

Languages
  - Official: Phalee Tew, Tangkhul
- Time zone: UTC+5:30 (IST)
- PIN: 795144
- Vehicle registration: MN
- Nearest city: Ukhrul
- Literacy: 81.35%
- Lok Sabha constituency: Outer Manipur
- Vidhan Sabha constituency: Chingai
- Website: manipur.gov.in

Phalee also called as Phadang is a village located west of Ukhrul in Ukhrul district, Manipur state in India. It lies in the Indo-Burma Biodiversity Hot-Spot Region of the world wherein the flora and fauna diversity are very rich.

== Geography and Weather ==
It occupies a total area of about 17 sq. km. It has Red Sandy Soils and an annual rainfall of 2000-2400mm. The average temperature is in the range of 17 °C.

Phalee is flanked by Ngainga (Ngaimu) and Talui (Tolloi) in the East, Somdal and Hoomi at the north, Tuinem and Lamlang in the south, and Champhung and Tora in the west. The village is assumed to be more than 600 years old (approximately) since the first settler settled in relation to the sixteen generations back.

The region's habitat consists of Mizoram-Manipur-Kachin rainforests. The area has a predominantly warm and temperate climate with dry winters and warm summers. The solar noon at this location is about 11.10 AM. in winter to 11.20 am in summer. It is a part of the Tropical and Subtropical Moist Broadleaf Forests biome. It has a mean soil pH of 5.49 and 1.49 aridity index. The current organic carbon content in the soil (within the top 2 M) is about 584,080 tonnes; the net primary productivity is about 20,882 Tonnes of carbon, which is the rate at which the carbon is accumulating as biomass in live plants. The total annual evatranspiration is estimated to be 619 kg water per m2. It is the water that moves from this village.

== Demography ==
As per 2011 census, the village has a total of 794 households with 3742 persons of which 1934 are male while 1808 are female. Of the total population, 11.60% are in the age group of 0–6 years. The average sex ratio of the village is 904 female per 1000 male. The literacy rate of the village is 81.35%. The male literacy stands at 84.64% while female literacy rate was 77.84%.

== Organization ==
- Headman
- Village Authority
- PNBC (Phalee Ngarumphung Baptist Church)
- Women Society
- Shanao Long
- Phalee Consultation Conference
- Yarnao Long
- Phalee Youth Organisation
- Phalee Football Clubs
- (Clan) Shangnao Funds
- Tang
- CYS
- Phalee Wuiri Kumhor Picnic Party
- Phalee Biodiversity Management Committee
- Rainforest Biodiversity of Phalee

It is a small village which values democracy that is evidently clear from its diverse organizations within the village. It has its own customary constitution for their village functioning.

Phalee Biodiversity Management Committee (Phalee BMC) is an organisation which is elected by the villagers to work on Environment and Biodiversity conservation of the village in accordance with the Biological Diversity Act, 2002. It also works on recording and documentation of the village and surrounding areas flora and fauna. It is the first institute among the villages of Ukhrul District that established Biodiversity Zone, recorded, documented and cataloged flora and fauna of the region on its founded group Rainforest Biodiversity of Phalee within India Biodiversity Portal. Some of the main objectives of Phalee BMC are Preservation, Conservation, and Education of Biodiversity and People’s Culture . It also works on village Heritage.

== Religion and educational institutions ==
Phalee is one of the Tangkhul villages that embraced Christianity very early. For this, the villagers got access to western education right from the coming of Christian missionaries to Ukhrul district. According to the 2011 census, the literacy rate of the village was 81.35% which is higher than the state's average of 76.94%.

== People and occupation ==
The village is home to people of Tangkhul Naga tribe and speak Tangkhul language. Agriculture is the primary occupation of the inhabitants. Rice, maize, potato, and cabbage are the main crops grown in Phalee. The traditional farming system has been an integral part of this village livelihood since time immemorial and accordingly, it is closely interwoven with the intricate fabric of the society in culture, religions, and economy. The farming system covers wet paddy cultivation, slash and burn and the other allied agricultural activities comprising forest gathering, artisanship, crop festivals, kitchen gardening, domestication of birds and animals, fisheries, and rearing of edible insects. Rearing edible six-legged insects like Asian giant hornet (Vespa mandarinia), honey bees, green grasshoppers, etc.

Most of these practices are social and community-based activity and their importance is pertinently expressed in their various culture. They are very old practices and the production system are generally trivial, merely a paltry self-sufficient to safeguard the basic level of survival. The agriculture system is stagnated which is proved by the unremitting abject poverty of the village life plagued with malnutrition, ill health and lack of basic amenities like telecommunications, transport, and marketing. However, in recent year there is a tremendous improvement in the rearing of the domestic animal and bird and especially fishery, producing approximately 1000 kg of fish (common carp and other local variety) per year. It is one of the villages that upholds afforestation programme with Government agencies with huge success and one of the villages that planted the highest number of trees thus far.

Artisanship is one of the old traditional practises of this village which include weaving, blacksmith, bamboo weaving, stone and wood carving works etc. The artisanship constitute one of the basic scale of their development index in the past.

== Culture ==
Luira Phanit or the seed-sowing festival is perhaps still one of the biggest traditional festivals of the Tangkhuls Naga which are celebrated every year with great pomp and joy. This is a festival celebrated in every Tangkhul village at the beginning of the year though with some modifications now (the date of celebration differs from village to village), precisely to herald the coming of a new year and to commemorate the beginning of sowing the first seed for the coming year. This is the main agricultural festival of the year and its celebration spread over a period of about eleven days in the olden days though the celebration does not extend that much longer nowadays.

Since the advent of Christianity and in the years that followed, an understanding between the Christians and the non-Christians of this village was brought about in regard to the fixation of the date for its celebration wherein, 15 – 20 March of every year was exclusively set aside for this festival of which, hitherto it was usually celebrated a little earlier than this. It is almost a week-long celebration. Some of the competition items during the festival includes folk song (this includes Yarra Laa, Ngakhakva Laa and Phalee Awungashi Laa), folk dance, Luita Laa, high jump, long jump, wrestling, bamboo climbing, carrying rice pounding stick on the back, tug of war, trumpet, flute, violin, guitar and many more. Tug of war is one event during the festival.

The dying giant may not figuratively represent a human giant but it’s about the practice, tradition of carrying a giant load of paddy (Lengvei Kaphung) a popular age-old practice among Tangkhul Nagas during harvest time in Phalee village too, situated in the west of Ukhrul district in Manipur. Lengvei Kaphung is a challenge for all men of the village. A giant load of paddy tightly packed in traditional specially hand weaved shawls weighs more than 300 kgs or 3 quintals of paddy. The handicrafts using bamboo sliver is another skill which is hand weaved into different shape and size of baskets for the different household purposes like containers, carpet and decorations .
