= Pharung =

Pharung Shimtang
- Village
- Location in Manipur, India Pharung (India)
- Coordinates: 25°04′53″N 94°19′05″E
- Country: India
- State: Manipur
- District: Ukhrul

Population
  - Total: 1,109

Languages
  - Official: Tangkhul Pharung tou
- Time zone: UTC+5:30 (IST)
- PIN: 795142
- Vehicle registration: MN
- Nearest city: Ukhrul Imphal
- Literacy: 81.52%
- Lok Sabha constituency: Outer Manipur
- Vidhan Sabha constituency: Ukhrul
- Website: manipur.gov.in

Pharung also called as Shimtang is a village located west of Ukhrul in Ukhrul district, Manipur state, India. The village falls under Ukhrul sub division. Pharung borders with Hunphun (Ukhrul) village and Hungpung. The village is connected by the old National highway road route. Pharung is flanked by Ukhrul in the east, Seikhor in the west, Tashar in the south and Ngainga in the north. Locally the inhabitants speak Pharung tou which belongs to the Tibeto-Burman language family.

== Total population ==
According to 2011 census, Pharung has 175 households with the total of 1109 people of which 553 are male and 556 are female. Of the total population, 173 were in the age group of 0–6 years. The average sex ratio of the village is 1005 female to 1000 male which is higher than the state average of 985. The literacy rate of the village stands at 81.52% which is higher than the state average 76.94%. Male literacy rate stands at 86.17% while female literacy rate was 76.82%.

== People and occupation ==
The village is home to people of Tangkhul Naga tribe. Majority of the inhabitants are Christians. Agriculture is the primary occupation of the inhabitants. Pharung is one of the 44 villages in Ukhrul district that would be affected being a catchment area when the Mapithel Dam is finally completed and fully functional.
