= Zingsui =

Zingsui Chingshou
- Village
- Location in Manipur, India Zingsui (India)
- Coordinates: 25°05′26″N 94°32′08″E
- Country: India
- State: Manipur
- District: Ukhrul

Population
  - Total: 602

Languages
  - Official: Tangkhul (Zingsui Tui)
- Time zone: UTC+5:30 (IST)
- PIN: 795142
- Vehicle registration: MN
- Nearest city: Ukhrul Imphal
- Literacy: 79.58%
- Lok Sabha constituency: Outer Manipur
- Vidhan Sabha constituency: Ukhrul

Zingsui is a village located east of Ukhrul in Ukhrul district, Manipur state, India. The village is flanked by Mapum and Pushing in the south, Sihai and Khamasom in the north, Ukhrul and Shirui in the west and Khayang in the east.

== Demographics ==
According to 2011 census, Zingsui has 94 households with the total of 602 people of which 296 are male and 306 are female. Of the total population, 78 were in the age group of 0–6 years. The average sex ratio of the village is 1034 female to 1000 male which is higher than the state average of 985. The literacy rate of the village stands at 79.58% which is higher than the state average 76.94%. Male literacy rate stands at 85.10% while female literacy rate was 74.35%.

== Culture and economy ==
The village is home to people of Tangkhul Naga tribe. The majority of the inhabitants are Christians. Locally, the inhabitants speak Zingsui tui which belongs to the Tibeto-Burman language family. Agriculture is the primary occupation of the inhabitants.

== Transport ==
The village is about 35 kilometers from Ukhrul and is partially connected by National Highway 150 that connects Imphal and Kohima via Ukhrul and Jessami. Travel time to the village from Ukhrul was drastically reduced with the construction of SDC Block villages under PMGSY, however, this road remains unmotorable mostly during the rainy seasons due to poor maintenance.
