= Awang Kasom =

- Village
- Location in Manipur, India Awang Kasom (India)
- Coordinates: 25°17′02″N 94°28′12″E
- Country: India
- State: Manipur
- District: Chingai

Population
  - Total: 687

Languages
  - Official: Tangkhul Awang Kasom
- Time zone: UTC+5:30 (IST)
- PIN: 795142
- Vehicle registration: MN
- Nearest city: Ukhrul Kohima
- Literacy: 89.11%
- Lok Sabha constituency: Outer Manipur
- Vidhan Sabha constituency: Chingai
- Website: manipur.gov.in

Awang Kasom is a village located north of Ukhrul in Ukhrul district, Manipur state, India. The village falls under Chingai sub division. National Highway 150 that connect Imphal-Kohima via Ukhrul and Jessami passes through the village. Awang Kasom is about 50 kilometers from Ukhrul; and is flanked by kuirei in the south, Peh in the west, Chingai in the north and poi in the east. Locally, the inhabitants speak Awang Kasom dialect that belongs to the Tibeto-Burman language family.

== Total population ==
According to 2011 census, Awang Kasom has 122 households with the total of 687 people of which 399 are male and 288 are female. Of the total population, 72 were in the age group of 0–6 years. The average sex ratio of the village is 722 female to 1000 male which is lower than the state average 985. The literacy rate of the village stands at 89.11% which is higher than the state average 76.94%. Male literacy rate stands at 94.18% while female literacy rate was 81.89%.

== People and occupation ==
The village is home to people of Tangkhul Naga tribe. Majority of the inhabitants are Christians. Agriculture is the primary occupation of the inhabitants. In January, 2009, an Assam Rifle jawan shot dead a Junior Commission Officer and injured other five at Awang Kasom camp.
