= Kachai =

Kachai kachew
- Village
- Location in Manipur, India Kachai (India)
- Coordinates: 25°14′29″N 94°16′22″E
- Country: India
- State: Manipur
- District: Ukhrul

Population
  - Total: 2,107

Languages
  - Official: Tangkhul (Kachaitui)
- Time zone: UTC+5:30 (IST)
- PIN: 795144
- Vehicle registration: MN
- Imphal: Ukhrul
- Literacy: 77.51%
- Lok Sabha constituency: Outer Manipur
- Vidhan Sabha constituency: Chingai
- Website: manipur.gov.in

Kachai is a generic reference to three settlements Kachai, Kachai Shimphungrim and Kachai Theikhor; located north-west of Ukhrul in Ukhrul district, Manipur state, India. The village connected to the district headquarters by an inter-village road and is approximately 46 kilometers from Ukhrul district Headquarter. Kachai is flanked by Hoomi in the east, Theiva in the north, Tingshong in the west and Phungthar in the south.

There is fertile land that is appropriate for agriculture.

There are three autonomous Churches in Kachai village. They are kachai baptist church, Thikhor baptist church and Shimphungrim baptist church. The Kachai baptist Church founded the Thotchan Baptist School. Over the years, it has become the alma mater for many students from the neighbouring villages, producing good grades HSLC passed out students.

The famous river Iril, passes nearby Kachai village. Kachai is home to many tourist spots and farms - Forest, Army Camp (it is called so, as Indian Army used to reside here, where, all the neighbouring villages were visible) and Langlarim to name few.

Every household has lemon trees planted in their backyard. The villagers also plant papaya, passion fruit, guava, oranges, avocado, sugarcane, plum, peach, pineapple to name few and vegetables such as broccoli, potato, cabbage, mustard, brinjal, chilly, gourd to name few.

== Population ==
As per 2011 census, the village has a total of 510 houses with 2107 persons of which 1092 are male while 1015 are female. Of the total population, 204 are in the age group of 0–6 years. The average sex ratio of the village is 838 female per 1000 male which is lower than the state's average of 930. The literacy rate of the village is 77.51%.

== Kachai lemon ==
Kachai is famous for large scale lemon plantation and production. Kachai lemon is one among the ten horticultural products from North East India to have got the GI tags. GI tags are given to products that are native to the place of production alone.

== People and occupation ==
The village is home to people of Tangkhul Naga tribe. The inhabitants are 100% Christians. Agriculture is the primary occupation of the inhabitants. Women folk of this village are well known for weaving and embroidery. The village is well known in the district for its scenic beauty.
