= Halang, Ukhrul =

Halang
- Village
- Nickname: Huining
- Location in Manipur, India Halang (India)
- Coordinates: 25°10′26″N 94°22′16″E
- Country: India
- State: Manipur
- District: Ukhrul

Population
  - Total: 3,000

Languages
  - Official: Tangkhul (Halang tui)
- Time zone: UTC+5:30 (IST)
- PIN: 795142
- Vehicle registration: MN
- Nearest city: Ukhrul Kohima
- Literacy: 88.10%
- Lok Sabha constituency: Outer Manipur
- Vidhan Sabha constituency: Chingai
- Website: manipur.gov.in

Halang also misnomerly called Huining in Meteilon(Manipuris), is a village located north-west of Ukhrul in Ukhrul district, Manipur state, India. Halang is approximately 10 kilometers from Ukhrul. The village is flanked by Phungcham in the north, Lunghar in the east, Talui in the west and Faling in the south. Locally inhabitants speak Halang dialect which belongs to the Tibeto-Burman language family. The village is divided into four colonies: Alungtang, Awungtang, Masorimtang, and Phungreitang.

== Total population ==
According to 2012 census, Halang has 688 households with the total of 2,878 people of which 1,431 are male and 1,447 are female. Of the total population, 466 were in the age group of 0–6 years. The average sex ratio of Halang village is 1011 female to 1000 male which is higher than the state average of 985. The literacy rate of the village stands at 88.10%. Male literacy rate stands at 90.50% while female literacy rate was 85.69%.

== People and occupation ==
The village is home to people of Tangkhul Naga tribe. Majority of the inhabitants are Christians. Agriculture is the primary occupation of the inhabitants. The village is well known in the district for its scenic beauty. The village was recently in the news because of widespread pine tree disease that also hit the vast reserved tree plantation area of the village.
