= Seikhor =

- Village
- Location in Manipur, India Seikhor (India)
- Coordinates: 25°05′30″N 94°18′17″E
- Country: India
- State: Manipur
- District: Ukhrul

Population
  - Total: 935

Languages
  - Official: Tangkhul Seikhor Tou
- Time zone: UTC+5:30 (IST)
- PIN: 795142
- Vehicle registration: MN
- Nearest city: Ukhrul Imphal
- Literacy: 87.24%
- Lok Sabha constituency: Outer Manipur
- Vidhan Sabha constituency: Ukhrul
- Website: manipur.gov.in

Seikhor is a village located west of Ukhrul in Ukhrul district, Manipur state, India. The village falls under Ukhrul sub division. Seikhor is partially connected by the old Imphal-Ukhrul road and is about 18 kilometers from Ukhrul. Seikhor is flanked by Pharung in the east, Teinem in the west, Tashar in the south and Ngainga in the north. Locally, the inhabitants speak Seikhor dialect that belongs to the Tibeto-Burman language family.

== Total population ==
According to 2011 census, Pharung has 177 households with the total of 935 people of which 487 are male and 448 are female. Of the total population, 128 were in the age group of 0–6 years. The average sex ratio of the village is 920 female to 1000 male which is lower than the state average of 985. The literacy rate of the village stands at 87.24% which is higher than the state average 76.94%. Male literacy rate stands at 92.29% while female literacy rate was 81.89%.

== People and occupation ==
The village is home to people of Tangkhul Naga tribe. Majority of the inhabitants are Christians. Agriculture is the primary occupation of the inhabitants. Seikhor is one of the 44 villages in Ukhrul district that would be affected being a catchment area when the Mapithel Dam is finally completed and fully functional.
