= M. K. Preshow Shimray =

Indian politician

MK Preshow Shimray

Deputy Speaker

Personal details
- Born: 5 April 1966 (age 60) Poi, India
- Party: Bharatiya Janata Party (2020-Present)
- Other political affiliations: Indian National Congress (Till July 2020)
- Education: Madras University (B.E. in Civil)
- Occupation: Politician

MK Preshow Shimray is an Indian politician from Manipur. He was elected as the MLA from 45 - Chingai (ST) Assembly Constituency in Manipur in the 2012 Manipur Legislative Assembly election as an Indian National Congress candidate. He joined Bharatiya Janata Party in July 2020.

== Early life ==
MK Preshow Shimray was born on April 5, 1966, in Poi village to MK Somi Shimray. He did his B.E and M.E (Environment) at Salem Engineering College, Tamil Nadu. After completing his education, he was employed in the Environment and Ecology Department, Manipur, first as a Scientific Officer and later as a Senior Scientific Officer.

== Political career ==
In 2012, he resigned from his engagement as a Senior Scientific Officer in order to contest the MLA election on a Congress ticket. He got elected beating his nearest rival with a simple majority vote. In July 2013, MK Preshow Shimray was elected as the Deputy Speaker of the Manipur Legislative Assembly with a term till 2017.

== Assassination bids ==
On April 30, 2013, the cavalcade of the deputy speaker was ambushed near Ukhrul by suspected NSCN (IM) cadres. However, no loss of life took place. Police claim that a bomb was detonated after the cavalcade passed leading to a 30-minute-long firefight between the security forces and the splinter group.

Another assassination attempt took place on April 10, 2014, where an IED was exploded by rebels at Leingangching near Litan, followed by a firefight, while Shimray was returning to Imphal after voting in Chingai. No member of Shimray's cavalcade was injured, and security forces were unable to capture the assailants.

== Anti tribal bills protests ==
In October 2015, the Tangkhul Naga Long, a Tangkhul rights organization demanded that 3 Tangkhul Congress MLAs resign as they did not voice enough opposition to three ‘anti-tribal Bills’ passed on August 31. Shimray did not follow the demand.
