= Kharasom =

Village in Manipur, India

Kharasom Village
- Kharasom
- Location in Manipur, India Kharasom Village (India)
- Coordinates: 25°26′50″N 94°27′38″E
- Country: India
- State: Manipur
- District: Ukhrul

Population
  - Total: 1,604

Languages
  - Official: Tangkhul (Kharasom tui)
- Time zone: UTC+5:30 (IST)
- PIN: 795142
- Vehicle registration: MN
- Nearest city: Ukhrul
- Literacy: 94.75%
- Lok Sabha constituency: Outer Manipur
- Vidhan Sabha constituency: Chingai
- Website: manipur.gov.in

Kharasom is a village located north of Ukhrul in Ukhrul district, Manipur state, India. The village is fully connected by National Highway 150, Imphal-Kohima road via Jessami. It is 85 km from the District headquarters and approximately 170 km from the state capital Imphal. Kharasom is flanked by Chingjaroi and Razai Khunou in the south, Laii (Senapati District) in the west, Wahong and Soraphung to its Northeast, Tusom in the East and Jessami to its north. pleasant temperature surrounded by Lush pine trees.

== Total population ==
As per 2011 census, Kharasom has 348 households with the total of 1604 people of which 819 are male and 785 are female. Of the total population, 239 were in the age group of 0–6 years. The average sex ratio of Chingai village is 958 female to 1000 male which is lower than the state average of 985. The literacy rate of the village stands at 68.06%.

== People and occupation ==
The village is home to people of Tangkhul Naga tribe. Majority of the inhabitants are Christians and agriculture is their primary occupation. The village is well known in the district for its scenic beauty, rich flora and fauna and important historical sites where ancient monoliths are found in abundance. The village is perhaps the first one among the Tangkhul villages to ban bird hunting, which otherwise is a favorite sport among the Nagas. During the Second World War, the village was used as a strategic location by the British to stop the invasion of Japanese forces in Indian soil. Kharasom was also a famous battlefield where many Japanese soldiers and Allied soldiers laid down their lives. In 1944, when the invasion of India by Japan was imminent, the Assam Regiment was moved to Jessami and Kharasom to delay the advance of the 31st Japanese division.
