= Ramva =

- Village
- Nickname: Lambui
- Location in Manipur, India Ramva (India)
- Coordinates: 25°01′28″N 94°17′15″E
- Country: India
- State: Manipur
- District: Ukhrul

Population
  - Total: 1,940

Languages
  - Official: Tangkhul (Ramva tou)
- Time zone: UTC+5:30 (IST)
- PIN: 795145
- Vehicle registration: MN
- Nearest city: Ukhrul Imphal
- Literacy: 92.86%
- Lok Sabha constituency: Outer Manipur
- Vidhan Sabha constituency: Ukhrul
- Website: manipur.gov.in

Ramva also misnomerly called as Lambui is a village located south of Ukhrul in Ukhrul district, Manipur state, India. The village is about 25 kilometers from Ukhrul via National Highway 150 that connects Imphal and Kohima via Ukhrul and Jessami. Ramva is flanked by Hatha in the north, Shangshak in the east, Lungpha in the south and Tungou in the West. Locally, the inhabitants speak Ramva dialect which belongs to the Tibeto-Burman language family.

== Total population ==
According to 2011 census, Ramva has 322 households with the total of 1940 people of which 1021 are male and 919 are female. Of the total population, 203 were in the age group of 0–6 years. The average sex ratio of the village is 900 female to 1000 male which is lower than the state average of 985. The literacy rate of the village stands at 92.86% which is higher than the state average 76.94%. Male literacy rate stands at 95.16% while female literacy rate was 90.33%.

== People and occupation ==
The village is home to people of Tangkhul Naga tribe. Majority of the inhabitants are Christians. Agriculture is the primary occupation of the inhabitants. Ramva is one of the 44 villages considered likely to be affected as a catchment area when the Mapithel multi purpose project is finally functional. The first Jawaharlal Nehru vidyalaya in the district was set up at Ramva in 1988.
