= Lunghar =

Lunghar Nunghar
- Village
- Location in Manipur, India Lunghar (India)
- Coordinates: 25°10′19″N 94°26′08″E
- Country: India
- State: Manipur
- District: Ukhrul

Population
  - Total: 1,917

Languages
  - Official: Tangkhul (Lunghir Tu)
- Time zone: UTC+5:30 (IST)
- PIN: 795142
- Vehicle registration: MN
- Nearest city: Ukhrul Kohima
- Literacy: 71.99%
- Lok Sabha constituency: Outer Manipur
- Vidhan Sabha constituency: Ukhrul
- Website: manipur.gov.in

Lunghar village is located north of Ukhrul in Ukhrul district, Manipur state, India. Lunghar villagers call Lunghar as Lunghir, Lunghar village is very fertile and rich in vegetation and fruits. Attractions in the village area include Phangrei, Jorcheng, Tingloi, Phungrim which is just 25 km from Ukhrul Town. National Highway 150, Imphal-Kohima road via Jessami passes through Lunghar and the village is about 18 kilometers from Ukhrul. Lunghar is flanked by Sihai in the east, Longpi in the north, Phungcham and Halang in the west and Shirui in the south. Locally inhabitants speak Lunghir dialect which belongs to the Tibeto-Burman language family. The village is divided into five major tangs; Soso tang, Layin tang, Hashunao tang (Haotang), Asai tang and Jorcheng tang.

== Total population ==
According to 2011 census, Lunghar has 435 households with the total of 1917 people of which 943 are male and 974 are female. Of the total population, 246 were in the age group of 0–6 years. The average sex ratio of Lunghar village is 1033 female to 1000 male which is higher than the state average of 985. The literacy rate of the village stands at 71.99%. Male literacy rate stands at 78.16% while female literacy rate was 66.00%.

== People and occupation ==
The village is home to people of Tangkhul Naga tribe. Majority of the inhabitants are Christians. Agriculture is the primary occupation of the inhabitants. The village is well known in the state for its Vegetable farming. Vegetables which are farmed includes Cabbage, Cauliflower, Broccoli and Peas etc. Phangrei is one of the most visited place among other picnic spots in the district. Paragliding has been introduced at Phangrei for the first time in the state at Shirui Lily Festival 2019. The village was recently in the news because of widespread pine tree disease that also hit the vast reserved tree plantation area of the village.
