= Khamasom =

- Village
- Location in Manipur, India Khamasom (India)
- Coordinates: 25°12′03″N 94°30′23″E
- Country: India
- State: Manipur
- District: Ukhrul

Population
  - Total: 9,006

Languages
  - Official: Tangkhul (Khamasom Tui)
- Time zone: UTC+5:30 (IST)
- PIN: 795142
- Vehicle registration: MN
- Nearest city: Ukhrul Kohima
- Literacy: 79.91%
- Lok Sabha constituency: Outer Manipur
- Vidhan Sabha constituency: Chingai and Ukhrul
- Website: manipur.gov.in

Khamasom is a generic reference to four villages located north of Ukhrul in Ukhrul district, Manipur state, India. The four villages are Khamasom Khayangkho, Khamasom Walely, Khamasom Phungdhar, and Khamasom Phungrei. The settlement is approximately 38 kilometers from Ukhrul and partially connected by National Highway 202, Imphal-Kohima road via Jessami. Khamasom is flanked by Sihai in the south, Huishu in the northwest Nungbi Khullen in the west and Myanmar in the east. The inhabitants speak Khamasom dialect which belongs to the Tibeto-Burman language family. The four villages are under one chieftain.

== Total population ==
As per the 2011 census, Khamasom Khayangkho has 388 households with the total of 1996 people of which 1070 are male and 926 are female. Of the total population, 214 were in the age group of 0–6 years. The average sex ratio of Khamasom Khayangkho village is 965 female to 1000 males which is lower than the state average of 985. The literacy rate of the village stands at 76.94%. The male literacy rate stands at 78.40% while the female literacy rate was 59.94%.

== People and occupation ==
The village is home to the people of the Tangkhul Naga tribe. The majority of the inhabitants are Christians. Agriculture is the primary occupation of the inhabitants. Khamasom has a vast forest stretching up to the international boundary with Myanmar and the stretch is rich in flora and fauna. Recently, the village was in the news for a sighting of a flower that resembles a deadly snake which the locals called Khamasam van; meaning Khamasom flower for being native only to the village.

== Vegetation ==
Khamasom village is known for its forest vegetation. The mostly found trees are Pine, Oak, Aldar, Wild Cinnamon, and many others. Khamasom is arguably the only village in northeastern India that has a thick virgin forest in the Indo-Burma border stretch.

One unique feature of the natural vegetation is that Khamasom has two locations - Nginu (means 'small meadow) and Ngirue (means 'big meadow in Khamasom village local language) - within the thick jungles where the rarest lily flowers thickly bloom in the month of May and June every year. Arguably, one can state that Khamasom Lilies are growing more and more in numbers while Shiroi Lily is diminishing due to improper care given to the Shirui Kashong by people, either tourists or native villagers. The occurrence of wildfire in the hill could be one main reason. But in the case of Khamasom, these two locations - Nginu and Ngirue are thickly forested areas, so no human destruction observed in the areas so far. In order to reach the locations, a visitor has to walk for a whole day and another whole day to walk back to Khamasom Khayangkho habitation.
