= Hungpung =

Hungpung Thawaijao Hundung
- Village
- Location in Manipur, India Hungpung (India)
- Coordinates: 25°04′13″N 94°21′05″E
- Country: India
- State: Manipur
- District: Ukhrul

Population
  - Total: 10,785

Languages
  - Official: Tangkhul
- Time zone: UTC+5:30 (IST)
- PIN: 795142
- Vehicle registration: MN
- Nearest city: Ukhrul Imphal
- Literacy: 86.64%
- Lok Sabha constituency: Outer Manipur
- Vidhan Sabha constituency: Ukhrul

Hungpung, also called Hundung, is a village located south in Ukhrul district, Manipur state, India. The village falls under Ukhrul sub division. HAO (Animism) religion was strictly practiced in the kingdom of "KHAYAIWUNG" i.e Kingdom of Hungpung Haokok.

Hungpung is one of the largest villages in Ukhrul district.

== Demographics ==
The village is home to people of Tangkhul Naga tribe. According to 2011 census, Hungpung has 2036 households with the total of 10785 people of which 5575 are male and 5010 are female. Of the total population, 1433 were in the age group of 0–6 years. The average sex ratio of the village is 935 female to 1000 male which is lower than the state average of 985. The literacy rate of the village stands at 56.64% which is much lower than the state average 76.94%. Male literacy rate stands at 79.68% while female literacy rate was 83.41%.

The majority of the inhabitants are Christians.

== People and occupation ==
Agriculture is their main occupation, with the production of rice beer (fermented rice) and sand also serving as significant sources of income. The village has a rich deposit of limestone and there used to be a cement factory, which now is non-functional. Hungpung is famous for the yearly pre-harvest festival celebration, locally known as Dharreo wherein the neighboring villages and tourists participate in large number. The village is one of the 44 villages in Ukhrul district that would be affected being a catchment area when the Mapithel Dam is finally completed.

The MLA from Ukhrul constituency from 2012 to 2017 was Samuel Risom who hails from Hungpung village.
