= Shangshak =

- Village
- Location in Manipur, India Shangshak (India)
- Coordinates: 24°48′58″N 94°21′25″E
- Country: India
- State: Manipur
- District: Ukhrul

Population
  - Total: 3,446

Languages
  - Official: Tangkhul (Shangshak tui)
- Time zone: UTC+5:30 (IST)
- PIN: 795142
- Vehicle registration: MN
- Nearest city: Ukhrul Imphal
- Literacy: 87.72%
- Lok Sabha constituency: Outer Manipur
- Vidhan Sabha constituency: Ukhrul
- Website: manipur.gov.in

Shangshak is a generic reference to two villages viz. Shangshak Khullen and Shangshak Khunou located south of Ukhrul in Ukhrul district, Manipur state, India. The village is about 15 kilometers from Ukhrul via National Highway 150 and the state highway that connects Ukhrul-Kamjong via Shangshak. Shangshak is flanked by Hungpung in the north, Koso in the south, Ramva in the west and Gamnom and Yengtem in the east. Locally, the residents speak Shangshak dialect which belongs to the Tibeto-Burman language family.

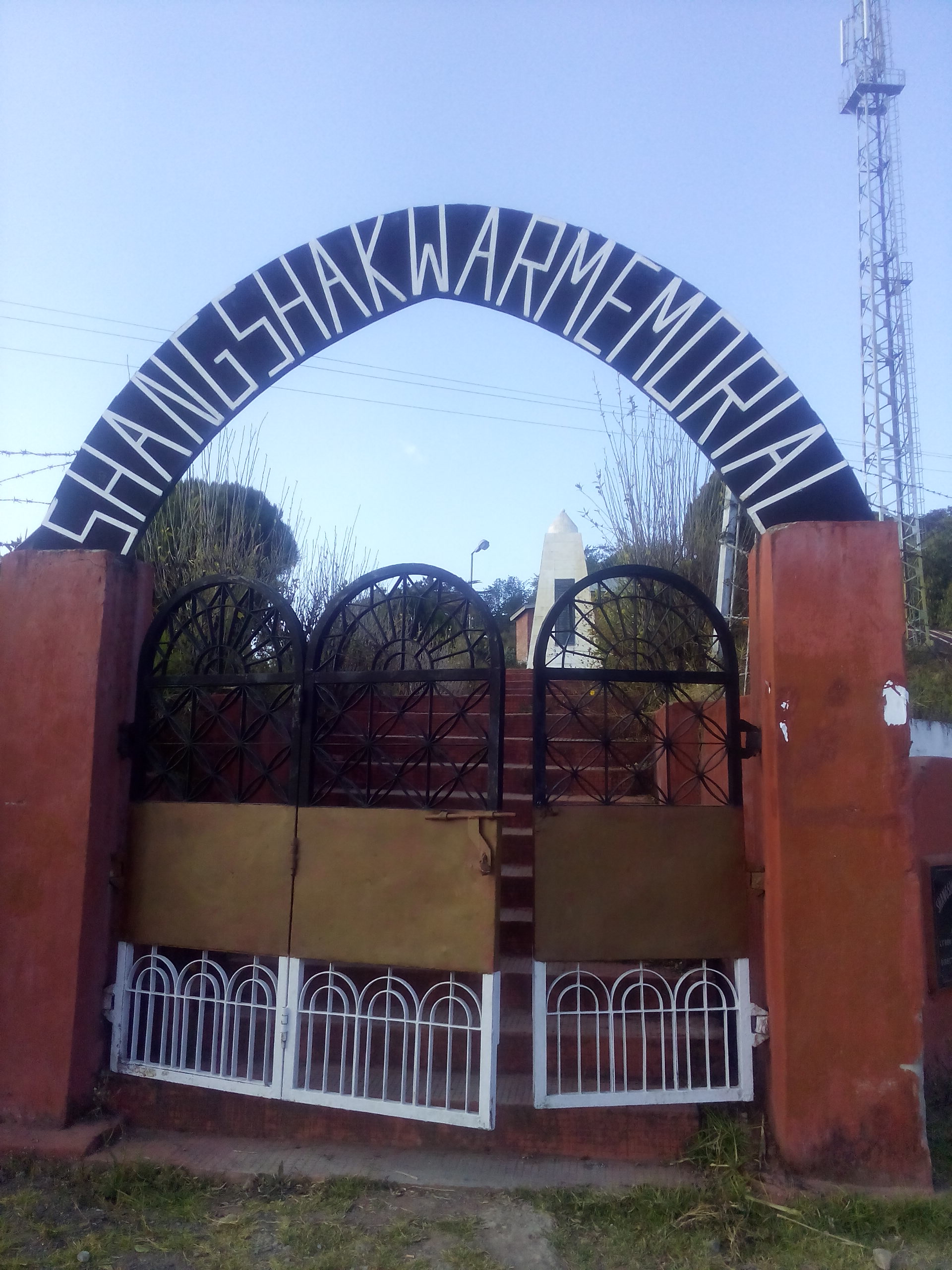
Shangshak Second World War Memorial

== Total population ==
According to 2011 census, Shangshak Khunou has 174 households with the total of 1025 people of which 532 are male and 493 are female. Of the total population, 149 were in the age group of 0–6 years. The average sex ratio of the village is 927 female to 1000 male which is lower than the state average of 985. The literacy rate of the village stands at 87.72%. Male literacy rate stands at 92.76% while female literacy rate was 82.14%.

The total number of households of Shangshak Khullen according to 2011 census is 281 with the total of 2441 people of which 1671 are male and 770 are female. Of the total population, 177 were in the age group of 0–6 years. The average sex ratio of the village is 461 female to 1000 male which is lower than the state average of 985. The literacy rate of the village stands at 87.72%. Male literacy rate stands at 92.94% while female literacy rate was 75.52%.

== People and occupation ==
The village is home to people of Tangkhul Naga tribe. Majority of the inhabitants are Christians. Agriculture is the primary occupation of the inhabitants. Shangshak is one of the 44 villages considered likely to be affected as a catchment area when the Mapithel multi purpose project is finally functional. There is a war memorial in the village dedicated to the memory of the slain soldiers in the fierce battle fought there during the Second World War.

== The Battle of Shangshak ==
The Battle of Shangshak fought for two weeks from 21 to 26 March 1944 is considered one of the bloodiest battles of the Second World War.
