= Peh =

Village in Manipur, India, known as Peh

Peh Paoyi
- village
- Location in Manipur, India Peh (India)
- Coordinates: 25°17′01″N 94°23′56″E
- Country: India
- State: Manipur
- District: Ukhrul

Area
  - Total: 52 km^{2} (20 sq mi)
- Elevation: 1,662 m (5,453 ft)

Population
  - Total: 3,800 approx.
  - Density: 73/km^{2} (190/sq mi)

Languages
  - Official: Tangkhul and English
- Time zone: UTC+5:30 (IST)
- PIN: 795142
- Vehicle registration: MN
- Nearest city: Ukhrul
- Sex ratio: 1004 ♂/♀
- Literacy: 85%
- Lok Sabha constituency: Outer Manipur
- Vidhan Sabha constituency: Chingai
- Climate: Mountain type (Köppen)
- Website: www.peh.na

Peh pronounced "Pe-h" is a village in Ukhrul District, Manipur, India. The village was earlier called 'Paoyi', which is a misconstrued derivative of the original name 'Pehyi' given by outsiders. Peh is approximately 35 kilometers north of Ukhrul district headquarter. The village is partially connected by National Highway 150, Imphal–Kohima via Ukhrul–Jessami Highway. The village comprises two settlement areas: Proper Peh and Peh Ngahurum. The total population of the village is around 3800. The village panchayat (Sangvui) consists of the representative from different clans headed by an elected chairman is the Apex body of the village. All administrative, political and judicial decisions are taken by them. The judiciary functions are partly performed in the name of King (raja); also known as the khulakpa.

The size of Peh village is roughly 52 square kilometres. Peh is flanked by Kalhang, Kuirei, Marem, Marangphung, Namrei and Razai in the east, Paorei, Varangrai and Phungcham in the south, Chingjui (Chingjaroi or Swimai) in the north, Phaibung lower and Ngari in the north-west, Theiva and Hume in the west. Two rich rivers, Wuireikong and Mashakong flow in the eastern and western side of the village respectively, providing abundant source of water to the cultivators and hunters.

== People and place ==
Agriculture is the primary occupation of the settlers. Rice is the stable food of the villagers. The village is home to various flora and fauna species. Literacy rate of the village is 85%. Peh village is known for its landscape. The village is 100% Christian (American Baptist/Protestants), with more than 98% Baptist and the remaining Roman Catholic.

== Festival ==
Peh is one of the few villages among the Tangkhul Naga villages that celebrates the seed sowing festival, Luira Phanit, (locale: Luito) with strict adherence to traditional Tangkhul Naga custom and tradition. Other festivals include Christmas, Easter Sunday etc.

== Places of interest ==
'Shampirum' is the most visited place of the village, and offers views of many parts of the village and its surroundings. 'Longvuerap' Peh Youth Park is also in the area. 'Katorlue' is the Eternal spring of the village. 'Vansam' has lofty valleys with evergreen grasses and varieties of wild flowers. It is a natural playground of the village. 'Kuiching' is a gentle slope carpeted with evergreen grass. 'Lungku Ngakao' is a vantage point for viewing the East, West and North side of the village.
