= Tuinem =

Teinem
- Village
- Location in Manipur, India Teinem (India)
- Coordinates: 25°06′56.8″N 94°15′00.9″E
- Country: India
- State: Manipur
- District: Ukhrul

Population
  - Total: 4,058

Languages
  - Official: Tangkhul
- Time zone: UTC+5:30 (IST)
- PIN: 795142
- Vehicle registration: MN
- Nearest city: Ukhrul
- Literacy: 83.09%
- Lok Sabha constituency: Outer Manipur
- Vidhan Sabha constituency: Chingai

Teinem is a village located west of Ukhrul in Ukhrul district, Manipur state in India. As per 2011 census, the village has a total of 802 households with 4058 persons of which 2031 are male while 2037 are female. Of the total population, 13.45% are in the age group of 0–6 years. The average sex ratio of the village is 863 female per 1000 male. The literacy rate of the village is 83.09%. Neighbouring villages of Teinem are Phalee, Seikhor, Sirarakhong, Ngainga and Lamlang.

== Religion ==
Teinem is one of the Tangkhul villages that embraced Christianity very early. For this, the villagers got access to western education right from the coming of Christian missionaries to Ukhrul district. 99.9% of the population are Christians. According to 2011 census, the literacy rate of the village was 83.09% which is higher than the state's average of 76.94%.

== People and Occupation ==
The village is home to people of Tangkhul Naga tribe. Agriculture is the primary occupation of the inhabitants.
