= Somdal =

Somdal Shongran
- Village
- Location in Manipur, India Somdal (India)
- Coordinates: 25°09′59″N 94°17′18″E
- Country: India
- State: Manipur
- District: Ukhrul

Population
  - Total: 2,375

Languages
  - Official: Tangkhul sHONGRAN
- Time zone: UTC+5:30 (IST)
- PIN: 795144
- Vehicle registration: MN
- IMPHAL: Ukhrul
- Literacy: 92.39%
- Lok Sabha constituency: Outer Manipur
- Vidhan Sabha constituency: Chingai
- Website: manipur.gov.in

Somdal, also called as Shongran, is a village located west of Ukhrul in Ukhrul district, Manipur in India. As per 2011 census, the village has a total of 468 families of 2375 persons of which 1209 are male while 1166 are female. Of the total population, 13.14% are in the age group of 0–6 years. The average sex ratio of the village is 964 female per 1000 male. The literacy rate of the village is 92.39%.

== Notable people ==
Somdal is one of the Tangkhul villages that embraced Christianity very early. For this, the villagers got access to western education right from the coming of Christian missionaries to Ukhrul district. Some notable public figures from the village are Rungsung Suisa, Ruichumhao Rungsung and Thuingaleng Muivah. Ruichumhao was one of the earliest Tangkhuls who converted to Christianity by William Pettigrew, the first Christian Missionary to set foot in the Tangkhul hills. When the First World War broke out, Ruichumhao served as the main interpreter for the Britishers and was sent to France as a leader of the Labour Corp. Rungsung Suisa was patriot who fought for the liberation of the Nagas from Indian occupation first as a politician and later as a rebel leader under NNC (Naga National Council). According to 2011 census, the literacy rate of the village was 92.39% which is higher than the state's average of 76.94%.

India national football team central defender Hormipam Ruivah was born in Somdal.

== Demographics ==
The village is home to people of Tangkhul Naga ethnic group. Agriculture is the primary occupation of the inhabitants.
