= Phungcham =

Phungcham Phungchem
- Village
- Location in Manipur, India Phungcham (India)
- Coordinates: 25°13′32″N 94°23′33″E
- Country: India
- State: Manipur
- District: Ukhrul

Population
  - Total: 4,296

Languages
  - Official: Tangkhul (Phungchemtui)
- Time zone: UTC+5:30 (IST)
- PIN: 795142
- Vehicle registration: MN
- Nearest city: Ukhrul
- Literacy: 76.94%
- Lok Sabha constituency: Outer Manipur
- Vidhan Sabha constituency: Chingai
- Website: manipur.gov.in

Phungcham is a village located north of Ukhrul in Ukhrul district, Manipur state, India. The village is approximately 28 kilometers from Ukhrul and is connected by inter village road constructed under PMGSY. Phungcham is flanked by Longpi and Lunghar in the east, Peh in the north, Ukhrul and Halang in the south and Talui in the west.

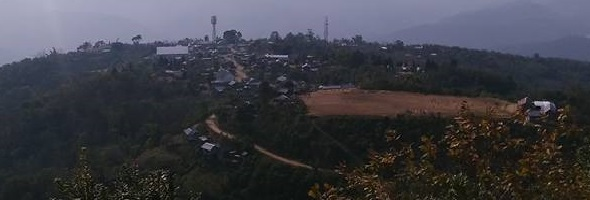
View of Phungcham from Longathan Hill

== Population ==
As per 2011 census, the village has a total of 762 houses with 4041 persons of which 2022 are male while 2019 are female. Of the total population, 753 are in the age group of 0–6 years. The average sex ratio of the village is 814 female per 1000 male which is lower than the state's average of 930. The literacy rate of the village is 85.81%. Male literacy rate stands at 85.81% and female literacy rate was 75.01%.

== Origin ==
The term Phungcham means old settlement in Tangkhul dialect. It is evident in the name of the village (Phungcham, meaning old settlement) itself and various historical places like 'Long-Ngathan' and 'Long-Ngasam' that the Tangkhul people dispersed from this village to their present settlements. It is considered one of the oldest villages in Ukhrul district. The village has places called Longathan (group dispersement spot), Longngasam (group resting spot), etc., to substantiate this claim. The people of Phungcham speaks local dialect called 'Phungchamtui' which many believed is the origin of many of the commonly spoken language among the Tangkhuls called 'Tangkhultui'.

Shimreishang and Maitonphi, the protagonists in the famous Tangkhul romantic folk tale were from this village. The epic love story of Shimreishang and Maitonphi has a typical tragic ending with Maitonphi being married off to Pansa (Falingwo) Vasah, Faling village chief in secret. Shimreishang was grief-stricken and died after getting the chance to bid goodbye to Maitonphi. Maitonphi also died shortly after. However, substantiating the Tangkhuls belief of life after death; the two lovers are believed to be re-united in the after life called as Kazeiram in Tangkhul dialect. Lengthui, a legendary prankster whose adventures exist as folk tales among the Tangkhuls also hails from Phungcham.

== People ==
The village is home to people of Tangkhul Naga tribe. The inhabitants are 100% Christians. Agriculture is the primary occupation of the inhabitants. The village is known its contributions to the history and folk culture of the Tangkhuls.
