= Chingai =

- village
- Location in Manipur, India Chingai (India)
- Coordinates: 25°18′51″N 94°30′02″E
- Country: India
- State: Manipur
- District: Ukhrul

Population
  - Total: 1,118

Languages
  - Official: Tangkhul (Chingai tui)
- Time zone: UTC+5:30 (IST)
- PIN: 795142
- Vehicle registration: MN
- Nearest city: Ukhrul
- Literacy: 61.75%
- Lok Sabha constituency: Outer Manipur
- Vidhan Sabha constituency: Chingai
- Website: manipur.gov.in

Chingai is a village located north of Ukhrul in Ukhrul district, Manipur state, India. The village is one of the seven sub-divisional headquarters of Ukhrul district. The village partially connected by National Highway 150, Imphal-Kohima road via Jessami. Chingai is also one of the 60 Vidhan Sabha constituencies of Manipur and Khashim Vashum is the Member of Ligislative Assembly (MLA) elected from this constituency & Minister of 1.Animal Husbandry & Veterinary Dept. 2. Transportation dept. of government of Manipur.[ The village is flanked by Awang Kasom in the west, Khamasom in the south, Somrah Tract in the east and Kharasom in the north.

== Total population ==
As per 2011 census, Chingai has 239 households with the total of 1118 people of which 574 are male and 544 are female. Of the total population, 148 were in the age group of 0–6 years. The average sex ratio of Chingai village is 948 female to 1000 male which is lower than the state average of 985. The literacy rate of the village stands at 61.75%.

== People and occupation ==
The village is home to people of Tangkhul Naga tribe. Majority of the inhabitants are Christians. Agriculture is the primary occupation of the inhabitants. The village is known in the district for its scnery. Being a sub-divisional headquarter, the village is home to a number of government offices.
