= Jessami =

- village
- Location in Manipur, India Jessami (India)
- Coordinates: 25.625°N 94.54°E
- Country: India
- State: Manipur
- District: Ukhrul
- Elevation: 1,218 m (3,996 ft)

Population
  - Total: 4,000

Languages
  - Official: [khezha(chakhesang)]
- Time zone: UTC+5:30 (IST)
- PIN: 795142
- Vehicle registration: MN
- Coastline: 0 kilometres (0 mi)
- Lok Sabha constituency: Outer Manipur
- Website: manipur.gov.in

Jessami is a village in Ukhrul district, Manipur, India. Jessami is a border village in the extreme north of Manipur State and borders with Meluri, a border village of Nagaland State. Being nearer to Nagaland, the town used to get electricity from Nagaland until the government of Manipur installed a 33 KV Sub-Power station in 2011 to supply power from Manipur. The village came to national attention in 2015 when a fatal bus accident claimed the lives of 13 passengers.

The inhabitants of Jessami are Chakesang. As it is in the border of Manipur and Nagaland, various languages including Khezha, Tangkhul, Meitei, and Nagamese are commonplace. About 85% of residents work in agriculture.

== Geography ==
It is an elevation of 1218 m above MSL.

== History ==
The first battle with the Japanese in Indian soil was fought in Jessami. On 28 March 1944, first battalion of the Assam Regiment fought a fierce battle with the Japanese 31 Division. The battle led to strengthening of defenses at Kohima, which played a role in turning the tide of the Second World War in favour of the Allied Forces.

== Location ==
National Highway 150 passes through Jessami.
