= Ukhrul district =

- District of Manipur
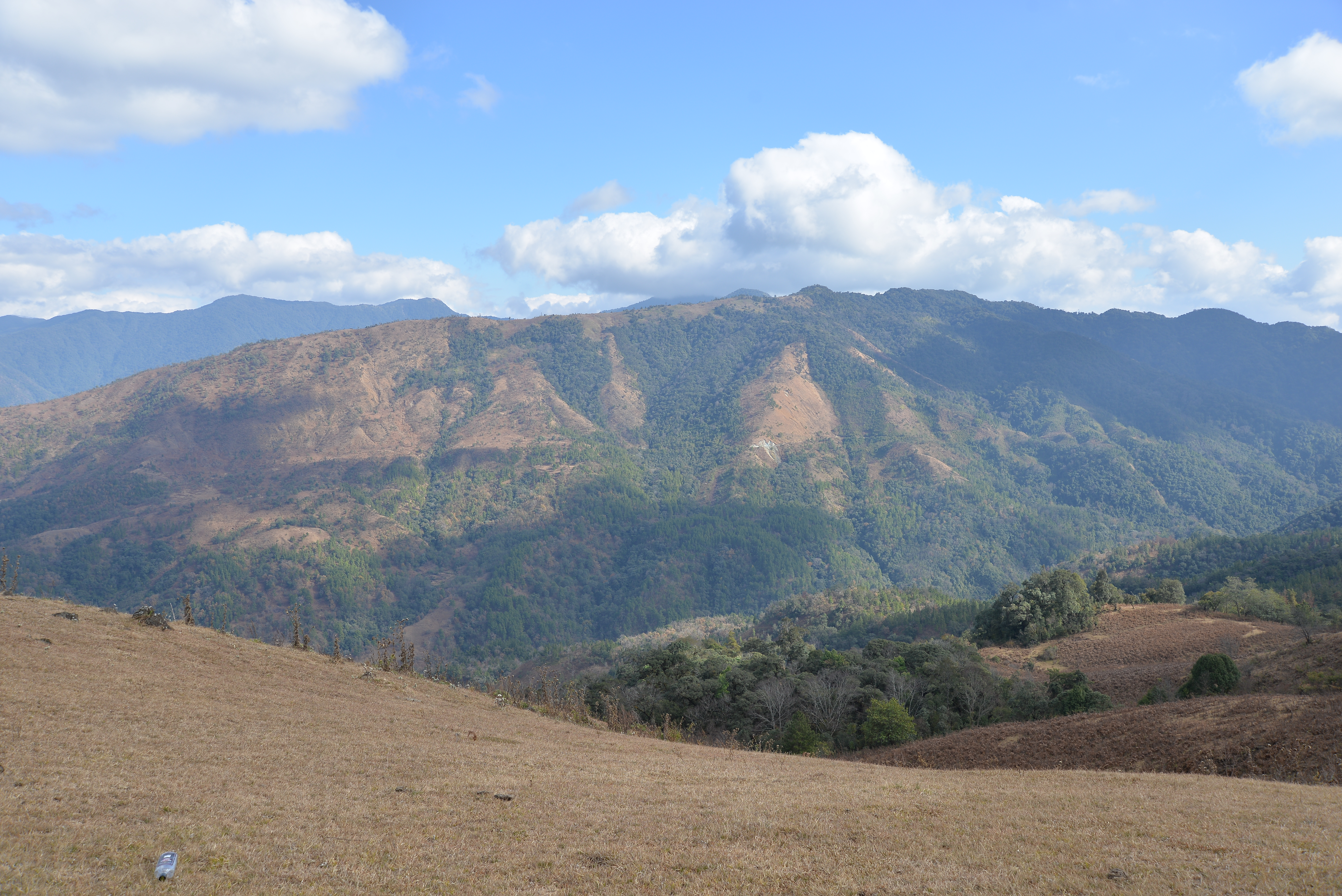
- Phangrei Hill, popular tourist spot

- Location in Manipur
- Coordinates: 25.1°N 94.3616°E
- Country: India
- State: Manipur
- Formation: 1969
- Headquarters: Ukhrul

Area
  - Total: 2,206 km^{2} (852 sq mi)
  - Rank: 4
- Elevation: 3,114 m (10,217 ft)

Population (2011)
  - Total: 138,382
  - Rank: 7
  - Density: 62.73/km^{2} (162.5/sq mi)
- Demonym: Tangkhul

Language(s)
  - Official: English
  - Regional: Tangkhul
- Time zone: UTC+5:30 (IST)
- Pincode(s): 795142
- Vehicle registration: MN
- Literacy: 81.35 %
- Website: ukhrul.nic.in

Ukhrul district (Meitei pronunciation:/ˈuːkˌɹəl or ˈuːkˌɹʊl/ (Note: Meitei language (officially known as Manipuri language) is the official language of Manipur. Other regional languages of different places in Manipur may either be predominantly spoken or not in their respective places but "Meitei" is always officially used.)) is an administrative district of the state of Manipur in India with its headquarters at Ukhrul. The Ukhrul district has a long history dating back to the 1920s when it was created as the North-East Hill Sub-Division of the then princely state of Manipur. In 2016, the Kamjong subdivision of the Ukhrul district was spun out as a separate district, leading to the present configuration of the Ukhrul district.

== History ==
The region to the north-eastern part of the Imphal Valley is the ancestral home to the Tangkhul Nagas from time immemorial. They have lived there independently with no control from outside world.

Until November 1969, Manipur existed as a single district made up of ten sub-divisions, and the area of present-day Ukhrul district was one among them. With the administrative restructuring of 1969, the area became a district called Manipur East, with the Ukhrul village functioning as the district headquarters. It comprised five sub-divisions namely Ukhrul North, Ukhrul Central, Phungyar Phaisat, Kamjong Chassad, and Ukhrul South headquartered at Chingai, Ukhrul, Phungyar Phaisat, Kamjong Chassad, and Kamsong Khullen respectively. In 1983, the district officially adopted the name Ukhrul district.

== Geography ==
2011 district map of Manipur; the Ukhrul district was divided into the present Ukhrul district and Kamjong district in 2016

Ukhrul District occupying the northeastern corner of the state lies between latitudes of 24° 29′ and 25° 42′ N and longitudes 94° 30′ and 94° 45′ E approximately (including Kamjong district). Nagaland bounds the district on the north, Kamjong District on the south, Myanmar (Burma) on the east and Senapati district and Kangpokpi District on the west. The north–south extension is longer than the east–west. The total area of the district is 4,544 square kilometres (1,754 sq mi) including Kamjong District. It has the distinction of being the highest hill station of Manipur. The terrain of the district is hilly with varying heights of 913 m to 2835 m (MSL). The highest peak is the Shirui Kaphung, at 2835 m (MSL). Most of the major rivers originate from the crevices and slopes of this Shirui Peak. The terrain of the district is rippled with small ranges and striped by few rivers.

The northern hilly region occupies the northern portion of the district and lies between the Akhong Lok or Laini Lok river and Chammu river. A big range stretches from north to south starting from near Jessami to Shirui Kashong as high as 2,568 metres above the MSL. The eastern hilly region occupies the eastern part of the district that lies east of the Chammu and Maklangkhong rivers. The Gamgimol or Nehdoh Lhang range forms an International boundary with Myanmar. The southern hilly region is situated at the southwestern corner of the district, which divides the Maklangkhong and Taret rivers. The district is drained by the two river systems, the Chindwin River system in the north and the Manipur river system in the south-west.

=== Flora and fauna ===
The district is home to hundreds of varieties of trees and flowering plants, orchids, epiphytic ferns, varied species of plants and shrubs. Some of the best known species of plants and trees includes Alder (Alnus nepalensis), Prunus cerasoides, Acacia auriculiformis, Parkia javanica, Paraserianthes falcataria, Michelia, Gmelina arborea, Pinus kesiya, Robinia pseudoacacia, besides various Iris (plant) species, wild roses, red and white rhododendrons etc. The district being covered with a wide dense of forest is a habitat of wild animals such as Elephant, Leopard, Tiger, Bear, Bison, Gaur, Crested porcupine, Pangolin, Jungle cat, Wild boar, Deer, Monkey etc. The state flower of Manipur, Shirui Lily, also called Shirui Lily or Lilium Macklinae is a rare pinkish white flower found only in the Shirui Hill Range in the Ukhrul District of Manipur. It is named after Jean Macklin, the wife of Dr. Frank Kingdon-Ward who spotted the flower in 1946 while collecting botanical specimens. The Royal Horticultural Society (RHS), London, United Kingdom, one of the world's leading horticultural organizations honoured the Shirui Lily with its prestigious merit award at its Flower Show in London in 1948. The evergreen forest presents the district with a sylvan landscape. Some commonly found trees are Pine, Albizia, Castanopsis, Mesua, Mangifera indica, Phoebe hainesiana, Albizia lebbeck, Teak, Oak etc. The forests are also interspersed with multi-bamboos especially in the southern portions.

Though the State Flower, Shirui Lily have attracted many tourists and botanists from around the world, it now faces a crisis of possible extinction in the near future and has been categorized as an Endangered species due to climate change, deforestation, wildfire, poor conservation approaches, intrusion of other plants and bushes, over exploitation etc. Scientists and experts have advocated for the Shirui Lily to be left as it is in nature, and assured us that nature is capable of healing it without human interruptions caused by a forest fire and unguided tourists. They have also suggested number of steps and measures that can be taken up by the centre and state government and participation of various research institutions to raise awareness of protection of Shirui Lily and implementation of conservative initiatives.

== Demographics ==
Historical population
Year	Pop.	±%
1951	41,182	—
1961	48,590	+18.0%
1971	62,229	+28.1%
1981	82,946	+33.3%
1991	109,275	+31.7%
2001	140,778	+28.8%
2011	183,998	+30.7%
2011 Ukhrul district (includes the present Kamjong district); Source: Census of India

Religions in Ukhrul district (2011)
Christianity	94.09%
Hinduism	4.56%
Islam	0.66%
Other or not stated	0.69%

According to the 2011 census Ukhrul district has a population of 183,998. This gives it a ranking of 593rd in India (out of a total of 640). The district has a population density of 40 inhabitants per square kilometre (100/sq mi). Its population growth rate over the decade 2001-2011 was 30.07%. Ukhrul has a sex ratio of 948 females for every 1000 males, and a literacy rate of 81.87%. The composition of population as per 2011 census is as below:

	Population	Percentage of Total Pop.
All Scheduled Tribes	173,606	94.4%
Kuki-Zo tribes (Note: The Kuki-Zo tribes include Gangte, Hmar, Paite, Simte, Sukte, Thadou, Vaiphei, Zou, and some smaller tribes designated as "Any Kuki" and "Any Lushai (Mizo)".)	9,473	5.1%
Naga tribes (Note: The Naga tribes include Angami, Kabui, Kacha Naga, Mao, Maram, Poumai, Sema and Tangkhul.)	160,534	87.2%
Old Kuki/Naga (Note: The Old Kuki tribes retaining the Kuki classification include: Aimol, Chiru, Kom, Koireng, Kharam, and Ralte. The tribes under the Naga umbrella include: Anal, Chothe, Koirao, Lamkang, Maring, Moyon, Monsang, Purum and Tarao.)	376	0.2%

The overwhelming majority of the people are Tangkhul Nagas, who make up 87.2% of the population.

Languages of Ukhrul district (2011)
1. Tangkhul (88.8%)
2. Thadou-Kuki (3.91%)
3. Nepali (1.59%)
4. Khezha (1.41%)
5. Hindi (1.08%)
6. Others (3.18%)

In terms of languages, 88.83% of the population speak Tangkhul, 3.91% Thadou-Kuki, 1.59% Nepali, 1.41% Khezha and 1.08% Hindi as their first language.

After the separation of the Kamjong district, the residual district has a population of 138,382 as per 2011 census. It has a sex ratio of 942 females per 1000 males. 19.64% of the population live in urban areas. Scheduled Castes and Scheduled Tribes make up 0.16% and 93.62% of the population respectively.

== Administrative divisions ==
The present district was made a full-fledged district as Manipur East District in 1969. The village, Ukhrul, became its headquarters, comprising Ukhrul North, Ukhrul Central, Phungyar Phaisat, Kamjong Chassad, and Ukhrul South as sub-divisions. Under Manipur Gazette Notification No.174 dated August 5, 1983, the name of the district came to be known as Ukhrul District after the name of the district headquarters, as in the case of other districts.

SDPO	Jurisdiction
SDPO, Ukhrul	Ukhrul, Litan, Somdal, Shangshak
SDPO, Jessami	Jessami, Chingjaroi, Kharasom, soraphung,
SDPO, Chingai	Chingai

Ukhrul District had three assembly constituencies before the bifurcation of the district into Ukhrul and Kamjong Districts. The constituencies are:

1. Phungyar Assembly Constituency (43-ST).
2. Ukhrul Assembly Constituency (44-ST).
3. Chingai Assembly Constituency (45-ST).

The Ukhrul District Autonomous Council (UADC) was instituted in the year 1971 under the Manipur (Hill Areas) District Council Act, 1971.

== See also ==
- List of populated places in Ukhrul district
- List of Naga people
- List of Naga tribes
- List of Naga languages
