= List of populated places in Kamjong district =

Villages in Kamjong district of Manipur, India

The Kamjong district of Manipur state in India is divided into 4 sub-districts called blocks. At the time of the 2011 Census of India, the Kamjong district (created in 2016) was a part of the Ukhrul district.

== Blocks ==
The Kamjong district has four sub-divisions called blocks: Kamjong, Phungyar, Sahamphung, and Kasom Khullen.

== Villages ==
=== Kamjong block ===
The Kamjong block includes the following villages:

Name	Population	Effective literacy rate	Sex ratio	SC population %	ST population %	Census code (2011)
Aishi	350	65.72%	1108	0.0%	99.43%	270466
Bungpa Khullen	2716	90.64%	664	0.74%	67.34%	270458
Bungpa Khunou	309	93.09%	797	0.0%	98.71%	270461
Chassad	729	71.96%	903	0.14%	92.73%	270462
Z. Choro	94	95.24%	649	0.0%	87.23%	270485
Grihang	782	98.17%	926	0.0%	99.36%	270488
Huimine Thana (Huimine Thana)	33	93.33%	1062	0.0%	84.85%	270467
Kangpat Khullen	353	61.72%	1006	0.0%	99.43%	270484
Kangpat Khunou	438	93.93%	904	0.0%	99.54%	270487
Khoikai	240	85.57%	846	0.0%	98.75%	270463
Kongkan	348	80.07%	923	0.0%	98.85%	270465
Kultuk	214	92.27%	1038	0.0%	98.13%	270470
Lakhan	200	68.07%	980	0.0%	99.0%	270469
Meiti	108	96.63%	895	0.0%	100.0%	270502
Molvailup	386	89.11%	911	0.0%	99.74%	270468
Nampisha (Ramphoi)	601	99.61%	1072	0.0%	99.67%	270489
Ningchou (Ningchau)	419	99.45%	1005	0.0%	96.66%	270483
Ningthi	926	93.38%	991	0.0%	99.35%	270498
Phaikok	391	83.67%	1015	0.0%	97.19%	270471
Phaimol	160	57.14%	905	0.0%	100.0%	270499
Phange	119	91.59%	889	0.0%	98.32%	270459
Pihang	178	76.67%	1225	0.0%	99.44%	270464
Sampui	343	74.4%	906	0.0%	99.42%	270460
Skipe	123	89.47%	1085	0.0%	97.56%	270486

=== Phungyar ===
The Phungyar block includes the following villages:

Name	Population	Effective literacy rate	Sex ratio	SC population %	ST population %	Census code (2011)
Alang	270	83.12%	1015	0.0%	97.04%	270523
Chadong (Chandong T)	1027	59.14%	878	0.0%	97.37%	270504
Chungkai	266	77.09%	942	0.0%	99.62%	270528
Honkhuiphung (Hangkhuiphung)	291	90.4%	914	0.0%	98.28%	270539
H. Goda	336	82.14%	1127	0.0%	98.21%	270521
Hundung (Hundung Godah)	10785	86.64%	935	0.06%	95.7%	270445
Khambi	642	66.42%	928	0.0%	96.73%	270530
Khongjal	324	85.71%	1077	0.0%	99.69%	270525
Khunthak	195	94.86%	912	0.0%	100.0%	270562
Koso (Kaso)	216	76.09%	846	0.0%	93.98%	270517
Lamlai Khunou (amalgamated with Lamlai Khullen to form Ramrei)	524	71.19%	1008	0.0%	99.81%	270505
Lamlai Khullen (amalgamated with Lamlai Khunou to form Ramrei)	454	87.11%	940	0.0%	96.92%	270506
Leishi	221	64.55%	973	0.0%	99.55%	270518
Leiting	248	79.34%	824	0.0%	98.39%	270519
Louphong	266	69.33%	873	0.0%	98.12%	270503
Loushing	160	86.13%	667	0.0%	99.38%	270527
Loushing Khunthak	174	89.12%	1486	0.0%	99.43%	270526
Lungphu	776	74.7%	965	0.0%	98.58%	270511
Marou (Marao)	309	94.03%	907	0.0%	97.73%	270513
Meiring (Meileng / Mailiang / Maileng)	445	85.71%	926	0.0%	100.0%	270531
Ngaprum	350	88.96%	934	0.0%	98.0%	270533
Nongman	452	90.58%	957	0.0%	99.34%	270534
Patbung	191	77.59%	1195	0.0%	97.38%	270532
Phalang	325	80.9%	901	0.0%	98.15%	270520
Phungyar (Phungyar Head Quarter)	953	88.35%	1002	0.0%	97.06%	270524
Punge	220	56.54%	1000	0.0%	99.55%	270537
Riha (Riha Tangkhul)	1087	91.29%	897	0.0%	93.01%	270507
Shakok	226	71.88%	1000	0.0%	96.9%	270522
Shingkap	723	81.06%	1020	0.0%	98.62%	270514
Shingta	322	84.46%	819	0.0%	99.69%	270512
Sikibung (Sikiphung)	1084	74.03%	936	0.0%	99.08%	270510
Sorathen	152	95.28%	974	0.0%	97.37%	270536
Sorbung	610	74.17%	1033	0.0%	99.51%	270538
Sorde	265	68.88%	934	0.0%	99.25%	270535
T. Hundung Khunou	224	56.99%	1036	0.0%	97.77%	270515
T. Hundung Khullen	640	86.4%	882	0.16%	99.84%	270516
Thawai (T)	1159	90.14%	866	0.0%	98.71%	270508
Thawai (K)	336	20.44%	797	0.0%	97.02%	270509

The following villages are not listed in the 2011 census directory: Ngabrum (Kumram), Leinganching, and Nagyophung.

=== Sahamphung ===
The Sahamphung block includes the following villages:

Name	Population	Effective literacy rate	Sex ratio	SC population %	ST population %	Census code (2011)
Apong	229	90.0%	1160	0.0%	96.94%	270491
Chahong Khullen	545	77.94%	1072	0.0%	99.63%	270496
Chahong Khunou	145	60.61%	1101	0.0%	100.0%	270472
Chamu	609	80.19%	1167	0.0%	96.06%	270476
Changa	293	57.43%	878	0.0%	94.88%	270440
Chatric	854	74.22%	919	0.0%	97.54%	270474
Gambal	96	67.95%	882	0.0%	97.92%	270481
Hangkou (Hangkaw)	312	88.64%	1167	0.0%	99.68%	270497
Kachouphung (T)	192	73.65%	1000	0.0%	97.92%	270479
Kachouphung (K)	127	47.79%	868	0.0%	100.0%	270480
Kashung	80	75.44%	778	0.0%	100.0%	270482
Khayang	334	85.15%	845	0.0%	98.2%	270478
Lanchah (Langcha)	84	74.63%	1049	0.0%	98.81%	270501
Langli	323	82.39%	900	0.0%	99.69%	270490
Lankhe (Langkhe)	147	94.02%	986	0.0%	96.6%	270495
Lonshak (Rushoah / Rushea)	251	94.93%	946	0.0%	96.41%	270456
Maku	635	95.81%	954	0.0%	99.21%	270492
Maokot	314	53.28%	880	0.0%	99.68%	270475
Mapum	1117	77.16%	988	0.0%	93.38%	270453
Matiyang	152	94.74%	1000	0.0%	98.03%	270477
Pushing	904	81.32%	961	0.0%	99.0%	270454
Roni	206	70.62%	981	0.0%	97.57%	270473
Sahamphung	147	82.5%	1194	0.0%	100.0%	270500
Yentem (Yingtem)	152	94.57%	854	0.0%	96.71%	270493
Shingcha	474	96.3%	1008	0.0%	98.31%	270494
Chingshou (Zingsui)	602	79.58%	1034	0.0%	97.51%	270455

=== Kasom Khullen ===
The Kasom Khullen block includes the following villages:

Name	Population	Effective literacy rate	Sex ratio	SC population %	ST population %	Census code (2011)
Ashang Khullen	123	81.19%	922	0.0%	100.0%	270546
Chakama	162	72.73%	976	0.0%	100.0%	270551
Bungpun	106	67.74%	1120	0.0%	100.0%	270575
Chingshou (Chingsou)	211	82.26%	884	0.0%	97.63%	270543
Chongdan	336	75.81%	1049	0.0%	99.4%	270544
Itham	240	93.85%	1087	0.0%	99.17%	270542
K. Ashang Khullen	205	71.01%	971	0.0%	96.59%	270574
K. Leihaoram	769	64.32%	1040	0.0%	98.83%	270552
Kasom Somrei	386	88.06%	1144	0.0%	98.96%	270549
Kangkum	371	94.81%	1084	0.0%	100.0%	270571
Kangoi	266	94.4%	887	0.0%	100.0%	270545
Kashung	474	91.33%	1008	0.21%	99.16%	270569
Kasom Khullen	1018	88.53%	917	0.0%	98.92%	270558
Kasom Khunou	204	59.76%	1242	0.0%	100.0%	270559
Khamlang	485	64.96%	1091	0.0%	99.38%	270560
Kharam Khullen (Kharan Khullen)	195	76.61%	1074	0.0%	100.0%	270553
Lairam Khullen	802	73.03%	995	0.0%	99.25%	270557
Lairam Phungka	384	95.5%	1098	0.0%	98.44%	270556
Khongle	270	87.05%	837	0.0%	99.63%	270568
Khoiripok (Lungtoram)	247	64.19%	1093	0.0%	99.19%	270555
Makan (Makhan)	136	97.5%	915	0.0%	100.0%	270572
Manthouram	274	81.4%	877	0.0%	98.18%	270567
Mawai	931	62.93%	892	0.0%	97.64%	270561
Nambashi Kachumram	60	96.0%	714	0.0%	100.0%	270570
Nambashi Khunou (Nambshi Khunou)	200	88.27%	1041	0.0%	100.0%	270564
Nambashi Khullen	884	85.57%	930	0.0%	98.53%	270565
Nambashi Valley	164	73.91%	843	0.0%	98.78%	270566
Nongdam (K)	60	67.31%	1308	0.0%	100.0%	270541
Nongdam (T)	957	91.77%	1006	0.0%	99.58%	270540
Shangpunram	196	80.23%	1042	0.0%	98.47%	270554
Shungriphai	264	91.6%	941	0.0%	97.73%	270550
T. Natuiang (T. Natiyang)	64	77.55%	939	0.0%	100.0%	270548
Tarong	338	63.49%	965	0.0%	99.7%	270563
Wanglee	130	91.82%	884	0.0%	100.0%	270573
Yeasem (Yeasom)	253	95.85%	917	0.0%	100.0%	270547

The following villages are not listed in the 2011 census directory:Bohoram, Khonglo, Khunthak, Kongluiram, Nambashi Horton, Ngaranphung, Punomram, Reishangphung, Sangpunram, Somthar, and Tamaram.
