= Nambashi =

Nambashi Nambashi Khullen, Nambashi Khunou, Nambashi Horton, Nambashi Kachumram, Nambashi Valley
- Village
- Location in Manipur, India Nambashi (India)
- Coordinates: 24°35′48″N 94°20′57″E
- Country: India
- State: Manipur
- District: Kamjong

Government
  - Type: Panchayati raj (India)
  - Body: Gram panchayat

Population
  - Total: 2,300

Languages
  - Official: Nambashi Dialect, Tangkhul, Meitei and English
- Time zone: UTC+5:30 (IST)
- PIN: 795149
- Vehicle registration: MN
- Nearest city: Imphal, Ukhrul
- Literacy: 95.42%
- Lok Sabha constituency: Outer Manipur
- Vidhan Sabha constituency: Phungyar
- Website: manipur.gov.in

Nambashi is a common reference to five villages in Kamjong District, Manipur State, India. Nambashi consists of Nambashi Khullen, Nambashi Khunou, Nambashi Horton, Nambashi Kachumram and Nambashi Valley. The villages fall under Kasom Khullen Sub-Division. The village is connected by Ukhrul-Phungyar NH-102A (Shangshak Tengnoupal) and Kasom-Yairipok ADB road. Nambashi is flanked by Tarong in the North, Kashung in the south, Tuyungbi RiverPunge and Sorde in the east and Taret River in the west. Locally, the inhabitants speak Dardouy dialect that belongs to the Tibeto-Burman language family.

== Total population ==
In the 2011 census, the four villages had 1308 persons in 247 households.

== People and occupation ==
The village is home to people of Tangkhul Naga tribe. Majority of the inhabitants are Christians. Agriculture is the primary occupation of the inhabitants. The village is known in the district for its reserve natural environment, flora and fauna. In December 2018, a rural market was inaugurated at Nambashi Khullen under the Mission for Integrated Development of Horticulture (MIDH) to boost cultivation and sale of local agricultural products. Leishiyo Keishing, hails from Nambashi Horton village.
