= Nambisha =

Nambisha Ramphoi
- Village
- Nickname: Nampisha
- Interactive map of Nambisha
- Location in Manipur, India Nambisha (India)
- Coordinates: 24°42′46″N 94°29′53″E
- Country: India
- State: Manipur
- District: Kamjong

Population
  - Total: 609

Languages
  - Official: Nambisha language Nambisha
- Time zone: UTC+5:30 (IST)
- PIN: 795142
- Vehicle registration: MN
- Nearest city: Ukhrul Imphal
- Literacy: 96.61%
- Lok Sabha constituency: Outer Manipur
- Vidhan Sabha constituency: Phungyar

Nambisha is a village located in Kamjong district, Manipur state, India. Nambisha is connected by Ukhrul–Kamjong state highway. The village is flanked by Punge in the west, Kangpat in the south, Kongkan Thana in the east and Ningchou in the north. Locally, the inhabitants speak Nambisha dialect that belongs to the Tibeto-Burman language family. Some researchers are of the view that the dialect spoken by the inhabitants has some affinity to that of the Koireng tribe.

== Total population ==
According to 2011 census, Nambisha has 92 households with the total of 601 people of which 290 are male and 311 are female. Of the total population, 87 were in the age group of 0–6 years. The average sex ratio of the village is 1072 female to 1000 male which is higher than the state average 985. The literacy rate of the village stands at 99.61% which is higher than the state average 76.94%. Male literacy rate stands at 100% while female literacy rate was 98.25%.

== People and occupation ==
The village is home to people of Tangkhul Naga tribe. Majority of the inhabitants are Christians and Nambisha and Bungpa hold the record of appointing women pastors in the 1940s; a rare historical privilege in a predominantly patriarchal society. Agriculture is the primary occupation of the inhabitants. Being a remote area, the village is often in the news for the poor transport system due to bad road condition and the inhabitants suffer most during the rainy season because of frequent landslides. Nambisha is close to the porous Indo-Myanmar international border and the village is often used as transit route by militants for which there are frequent encounters between the Indian arm force and militant groups.
