= Chongdan village =

Chongdan
- Village
- Location in Manipur, India Chongdan (India)
- Coordinates: 24°43′24″N 94°18′21″E
- Country: India
- State: Manipur
- District: Kamjong

Government
  - Type: Panchayati raj (India)
  - Body: Gram panchayat

Population
  - Total: 336

Languages
  - Official: Tangkhul
- Time zone: UTC+5:30 (IST)
- PIN: 795142
- Vehicle registration: MN
- Nearest city: Ukhrul Imphal
- Literacy: 75.81%
- Lok Sabha constituency: Outer Manipur
- Vidhan Sabha constituency: Phungyar
- Website: manipur.gov.in

Chongdan is a Tangkhul village in Kamjong District, Manipur state, India. The villages fall under Kasom sub division. The village is connected by National Highway 102 that connects Shangshak-Yairipok. Chongdan is flanked by Bongbal Khullen in the west, Leihaoram in the south, Ashang Khullen in the east and Itham in the north. Locally, the inhabitants speak Chongdan dialect that belongs to the Tibeto-Burman language family.

== Total population ==
According to 2011 census, Chongdan consists of 61 households with the total of 336 people. The average sex ratio of the village is 1,049 female to 1,000 male which is higher than Manipur state average of 985. Literacy rate of Chongdan is 75.81% with male literacy rate at 86.39% and female literacy rate at 66.26%.

== People and occupation ==
The village is home to people of Tangkhul Naga tribe. Majority of the inhabitants are Christians. Agriculture is the primary occupation of the inhabitants. The village is known in the district for its reserve natural environment, flora and fauna.
