= Khambi, Manipur =

Khambi
- Village
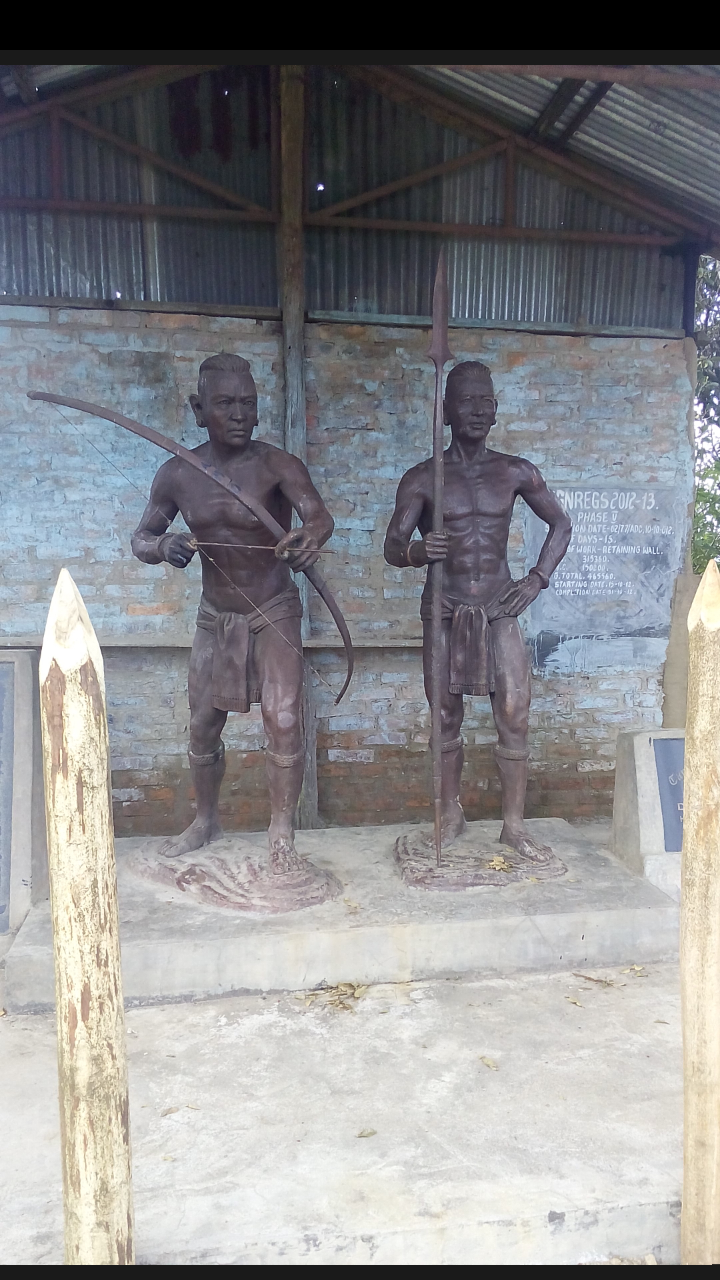
- Historical Monument at Khambi

- Location in Manipur, India Khambi (India)
- Coordinates: 24°47′08″N 94°21′18″E
- Country: India
- State: Manipur
- District: Kamjong

Government
  - Type: Panchayati raj (India)
  - Body: Gram panchayat

Population
  - Total: 642

Languages
  - Official: Tangkhul Khambi tui
- Time zone: UTC+5:30 (IST)
- PIN: 795142
- Vehicle registration: MN
- Nearest city: Ukhrul Imphal
- Literacy: 66.42%
- Lok Sabha constituency: Outer Manipur
- Vidhan Sabha constituency: Phungyar
- Website: manipur.gov.in

Khambi is a village located west of Kamjong in Kamjong District, Manipur state, India. The village falls under Phungyar sub division. The village is partially connected by Ukhrul-Phungyar state highway and Shangshak-Yairipok district road. Khambi is flanked by Khamlang in the west, Sorde in the south, Kangpat in the east and Phungyar in the north. Locally, the inhabitants speak Khambi dialect that belongs to the Tibeto-Burman language family.

== Total population ==
According to 2011 census, Khambi has 112 households with the total of 642 people of which 333 are male and 309 are female. Of the total population, 94 were in the age group of 0–6 years. The average sex ratio of the village is 928 female to 1000 male which is lower than the state average of 985. The literacy rate of the village stands at 66.42% which is lower than the state average 76.94%. Male literacy rate stands at 72.20% while female literacy rate was 60.52%.

== People and occupation ==
The village is home to people of Tangkhul Naga tribe. Majority of the inhabitants are Christians. Agriculture is the primary occupation of the inhabitants. The village is known in the district for its reserve natural environment, flora and fauna. Legend of the southern Tangkhuls opine Khambi as the point of dispersal during migration and settlement. Legend has it that the brother who was an ace spear thrower went north from Khambi and the other brother who was an excellent bowmen went south. A monolith depicting this legend is erected at Khambi village. Being a remote village, the village has a relatively poor transport system and bad road condition, and the inhabitants suffer most during the rainy season because of frequent landslides.
