= Chadong, Manipur =

Chadong
- Village
- Location in Manipur, India Chadong (India)
- Coordinates: 24°54′07″N 94°08′46″E
- Country: India
- State: Manipur
- District: Phungyar

Government
  - Type: Panchayati raj (India)
  - Body: Gram panchayat

Population
  - Total: 1,027

Languages
  - Official: Tangkhul
- Time zone: UTC+5:30 (IST)
- PIN: 795142
- Vehicle registration: MN
- Nearest city: Ukhrul Imphal
- Literacy: 59.14%
- Lok Sabha constituency: Outer Manipur
- Vidhan Sabha constituency: Phungyar
- Website: manipur.gov.in

Chadong refers to a Tangkhul village in Kamjong district, Manipur state, India. The village falls under Phungyar sub division. The village is partially connected by National Highway 150 that connects Jessami and Imphal. Chadong is flanked by Riha in the North, Nongdam in the South, Yaingangpokpi in the west and Shingkap in the east. Locally, the inhabitants speak Chadong dialect that belongs to the Tibeto-Burman language family.

== Total population ==
According to 2011 census, Chadong comprises 212 households with the total of 1027 people. The average sex ratio of the village is 878 female to 1000 male which is lower than Manipur state average of 985. Literacy rate of Riha is 59.14% with male literacy rate at 63.71% and female literacy rate at 53.90%.

== People and occupation ==
The village is home to people of Tangkhul Naga tribe. Majority of the inhabitants are Christians. Agriculture is the primary occupation of the inhabitants. In 2015, the original settlement got submerged in water when the Mapithel Multi Purpose dam was commissioned. Most of the arable land in the village also got submerged and some of the residents relocated to a higher ground while most of the residents resettled elsewhere. The village for now has become a tourist destination who mainly visit for sightseeing, fishing and camping by the dam. The submerged church and the old settlement is visible when the water level of the dam recedes during winter and is a major attraction for tourists to revisit the once flourishing village.
