= Ashang Khullen =

- Village
- Location in Manipur, India Ashang Khullen (India)
- Coordinates: 24°32′23″N 94°25′45″E
- Country: India
- State: Manipur
- District: Ukhrul

Government
  - Type: Panchayati raj (India)
  - Body: Gram panchayat

Population
  - Total: 123

Languages
  - Official: Tangkhul
- Time zone: UTC+5:30 (IST)
- PIN: 795142
- Vehicle registration: MN
- Nearest city: Ukhrul Imphal
- Literacy: 81.19%
- Lok Sabha constituency: Outer Manipur
- Vidhan Sabha constituency: Phungyar
- Website: manipur.gov.in

Ashang Khullen is a Tangkhul village in Ukhrul district, Manipur state, India. The village falls under the Ukhrul-South sub division. The village is connected by National Highway 102 that connects Shangshak and Yairipok. Ashang Khullen is flanked by Chongdan Village in the west, Nambashi in the south, Punge and Sorde in the east and Kangoi in the north. Locally, the inhabitants speak Ashang Khullen dialect that belongs to the Tibeto-Burman language family.

== Total population ==
According to the 2011 Census of India, the village comprises 26 households with the total of 123 people. The average sex ratio of the village is 922 female to 1000 male which is lower than Manipur state's average of 985. Literacy rate of Ashang Khullen is 81.19% with male literacy rate at 82.35% and female literacy rate at 80.80%.

== People and occupation ==
The village is home to people of Tangkhul Naga tribe. Majority of the inhabitants are Christians. Agriculture is the primary occupation of the inhabitants. The village is known in the district for its reserve natural environment, flora and fauna. In the run up to the 11 Manipur Assembly Constituency 2017, a school teacher on election duty died in a bomblast near Ashang Khullen.
