= Rishang Keishing =

6th Chief Minister of Manipur, India

6th Chief Minister of Manipur
- In office 14 December 1994 – 15 December 1997
- Governor: V. K. Nayar; Oudh Narayan Shrivastava
- Preceded by: Raj Kumar Dorendra Singh
- Succeeded by: Wahengbam Nipamacha Singh
- In office 19 June 1981 – 3 March 1988
- Governor: Lallan Prasad Singh; S. M. H. Burney; K. V. Krishna Rao
- Preceded by: President's rule
- Succeeded by: Raj Kumar Dorendra Singh
- In office 27 November 1980 – 27 February 1981
- Governor: Lallan Prasad Singh
- Preceded by: Raj Kumar Dorendra Singh
- Succeeded by: Raj Kumar Jaichandra Singh

Personal details
- Born: 25 October 1920 Bungpa Khunou, Manipur, British India
- Died: 22 August 2017 (aged 96) Imphal, Manipur, India
- Party: Indian National Congress
- Spouse: Khatingla
- Children: 6
- Education: Scottish Church College, St. Paul's Cathedral Mission College
- Occupation: Politician

Rishang Keishing (25 October 1920 – 22 August 2017) was an Indian politician from Manipur. Keishing served as Chief Minister of Manipur from 1980 to 1988 and from 1994 to 1998. He was a former Member of Parliament in the Rajya Sabha representing Manipur. He was the first Chief Minister of Manipur to complete his full term from 1981-1988.

== Early life and education ==
Rishang Keishing was born to Rungdi Keishing and Mungshingla Keishing, both from the Tangkhul Naga community in Bungpa Khunou, princely state of Manipur (now in Kamjong district of Manipur.

After studying for a year at Kolkata's Scottish Church College, he transferred to the St. Paul's Cathedral Mission College, from which he graduated.

== Positions held ==
- 1952–1957: Member of 1st Lok Sabha
- 1957–1961, 1967-1971: Member of Manipur Territorial Council
- 1962–1967: Member of 3rd Lok Sabha
- 1972–1974: Member of Manipur Legislative Assembly
- 1974–1976: Cabinet Minister, Government of Manipur
- 1976–1980: Opposition Leader, Manipur Legislative Assembly
- 1980–1985: Chief Minister, Manipur
- 1985 – Feb. 1988: Chief Minister, Manipur
- 1994 – March 1995: Chief Minister, Manipur
- 1995 – Dec. 1998: Chief Minister, Manipur
- April 2002: Elected to Rajya Sabha
- April 2002 – Feb. 2004: Member, Committee on Food, Civil Supplies and Public Distribution
- Jan. 2003 – Feb. 2004: Member, Committee on Commerce
- Dec. 2003 onwards: Member, Court of the North Eastern Hill University (NEHU)
- Aug. 2004 onwards: Member, Committee on Home Affairs
- Oct. 2004 onwards: Member, Consultative Committee for the Ministry of Shipping, Road Transport and Highways
- May 2006 – April 2007: Member, Committee on Public Undertakings
- April 2008: Re-elected to Rajya Sabha (2nd Term); retired on 21 February 2014 at the age of 94

== Political career ==
Keishing participated in the Indian freedom struggle; including attending meetings as a student, during 1945-47. He was a member of the Socialist Party of India, the Indian delegation to the Asian Socialist Conference held in Rangoon (Myanmar), the Indian National Congress, the Indian delegation led by the late Shri Yashwantrao Chavan to the 35th General Session of the UN held in U.S. in 1975, the Indian delegation to attend the 51st Commonwealth Parliamentary Conference held at Sheraton, Fiji, 2005 and Tenth Finance Commission.

He was the founding headmaster of the first high school in the district of Ukhrul, a founding member and honorary headmaster of Phungyar High School, and a founding member of a high school in Kamjong and Kasom Khullen. He served as Chairman to the Eastern Border Development Authority and Barak Development Board; and helped to set up the Foundation for Management of Tribal Areas (MATA) in 1998, the Fresh Ginger Oil Processing Pilot Project with technology developed by the NIIST, Trivandrum in 1998 and the Fruit Processing Unit with technology developed by the CFTRI, Mysore.

In 1952, Keishing was elected to the first Lok Sabha representing the Socialist Party. During his second term in the Lok Sabha, he informed Prime Minister Jawaharlal Nehru that he wanted to join the Indian National Congress and remained with the party until his death.

He first entered Manipur State's Vidhan Sabha in 1972, winning Phungyar seat, and represented the seat for 30 years, winning the election 7 times. In 2002, he lost in the assembly polls. His son, Victor Keishing, reclaimed the seat a few years later. After his defeat in the state polls in 2002, Rishang Keishing moved to Delhi, representing the state in Rajya Sabha for two terms, 2002 to 2008, and 2008 and 2014. In 2007 he became the country's oldest parliamentarian. He retired from Rajya Sabha in 2014, at the age of 93.

Keishing, along with D. Athuido, a former Member of the Legislative Assembly, was expelled from the Manipur Congress for six years in May 1968 for signing a memorandum to the Prime Minister of India which suggested that the Naga-inhabited areas of Manipur should be merged with Nagaland. In August 1972, he spearheaded an agreement between then United Naga Integration Council and the ruling Indian National Congress which recognised the vision of a Greater Nagalim, a region that would integrate Nagaland and the Naga-populated districts of Manipur under one administration.

Keishing also served as the Chief Minister of Manipur from 1980 to 1988, and from 1994 to 1997.

In 2014, Keishing declared that he would not contest the Rajya Sabha elections after serving two consecutive terms. He said, "I am not interested to continue now."

== Personal life ==
He married Khatingla Keishing in 1950, and the couple had two daughters and four sons. He died on 22 August 2017, aged 96 at Regional Institute of Medical Sciences Hospital, Imphal, Manipur.
