= Grihang =

- Village
- Location in Manipur, India Grihang (India)
- Coordinates: 24°47′03″N 94°28′34″E
- Country: India
- State: Manipur
- District: Ukhrul

Government
  - Type: Panchayati raj (India)
  - Body: Gram panchayat

Population
  - Total: 782

Languages
  - Official: Tangkhul Grihang Tou
- Time zone: UTC+5:30 (IST)
- PIN: 795142
- Vehicle registration: MN
- Nearest city: Ukhrul Imphal
- Literacy: 98.17%
- Lok Sabha constituency: Outer Manipur
- Vidhan Sabha constituency: Phungyar
- Website: manipur.gov.in

Grihang is a village located south of Ukhrul in Ukhrul district, Manipur state, India. The village falls under Kamjong sub division. The village is connected by Ukhrul-Kamjong state highway. Grihang is flanked by Tusom in the west, Ningchou in the south, Molvailup in the east and Bungpa in the north. Locally, the inhabitants speak Grihang dialect that belongs to the Tibeto-Burman language family.

== Total population ==
According to 2011 census, Grihang has 133 households with the total of 782 people of which 406 are male and 376 are female. Of the total population, 71 were in the age group of 0–6 years. The average sex ratio of the village is 926 female to 1000 male which is lower than the state average of 985. The literacy rate of the village stands at 98.17% which is higher than the state average 76.94%. Male literacy rate stands at 99.72% while female literacy rate was 96.56%.

== People and occupation ==
The village is home to people of Tangkhul Naga tribe. Majority of the inhabitants are Christians. Agriculture is the primary occupation of the inhabitants. The village is known in the district for its natural environment, flora and fauna. A remote area, the village has a relatively poor transport system and bad road condition, and the inhabitants suffer most during the rainy season because of frequent landslides.
