= Lungshang =

- Village
- Nickname: Lungshang
- Location in Manipur, India Lungshang (India)
- Coordinates: 25°03′01″N 94°23′35″E
- Country: India
- State: Manipur
- District: Ukhrul

Population
  - Total: 750

Languages
  - Official: Tangkhul (Lungshang tui)
- Time zone: UTC+5:30 (IST)
- PIN: 795142
- Vehicle registration: MN
- Nearest city: Ukhrul Imphal
- Literacy: 81.06%
- Lok Sabha constituency: Outer Manipur
- Vidhan Sabha constituency: Ukhrul

Lungshang is a small village located south of Ukhrul in Ukhrul district, Manipur state, India. The village is about 20 kilometers from Ukhrul partially connected by National Highway 150 that connects Imphal and Kohima via Ukhrul and Jessami. Lungshang is divided into two major parts, Lungshang Azing and Lungshang Ato and is flanked by Shangshak in the south, Nungshong in the west, Yengtem in the east and Khangkhui in the north. Locally, the inhabitants speak Lungshang tui which belongs to the Tibeto-Burman language family.

== Total population ==
According to 2011 census, Lungshang Azing has 55 households with the total of 324 people of which 183 are male and 141 are female. Of the total population, 58 were in the age group of 0–6 years. The average sex ratio of the village is 657 female to 1000 male which is lower than the state average of 985. The literacy rate of the village stands at 81.20% which is higher than the state average 76.94%. Male literacy rate stands at 86.49% while female literacy rate was 75.58%.

Based on 2011 census report, Lungshang Ato has 38 households with the total of 210 people of which 101 are male and 109 are female. Of the total population, 58 were in the age group of 0–6 years. The average sex ratio of the village is 1079 female to 1000 male which is higher than the state average of 985. The literacy rate of the village stands at 90.06% which is higher than the state average 76.94%. Male literacy rate stands at 90.80% while female literacy rate was 89.36%.

== People and occupation ==
The village is home to people of Tangkhul Naga tribe. Majority of the inhabitants are Christians. Agriculture is the primary occupation of the inhabitants. Lungshang is one of the 44 villages considered likely to be affected as a catchment area when the Mapithel multi purpose project is finally functional.
