= Shingcha =

- Village
- Location in Manipur, India Shingcha (India)
- Coordinates: 25°00′32″N 94°29′52″E
- Country: India
- State: Manipur
- District: Ukhrul

Government
  - Type: Panchayati raj (India)
  - Body: Gram panchayat

Population
  - Total: 474

Languages
  - Official: Tangkhul (Shingcha tui)
- Time zone: UTC+5:30 (IST)
- PIN: 795142
- Vehicle registration: MN
- Nearest city: Ukhrul Imphal
- Literacy: 96.30%
- Lok Sabha constituency: Outer Manipur
- Vidhan Sabha constituency: Phungyar
- Website: manipur.gov.in

Shingcha is a village located southeast of Ukhrul in Ukhrul district, Manipur state, India. The village is about 45 kilometers from Ukhrul and is partially connected by Ukhrul-Kamjong State highway. The village is flanked by Pushing in the north, Maku in the south, the Langkhe in the east and Shangshak in the west.

== Total population ==
According to 2011 census, Shingcha has 95 households with the total of 474 people of which 236 are male and 238 are female. Of the total population, 68 were in the age group of 0–6 years. The average sex ratio of the village is 1209 female to 1000 male which is higher than the state average of 985. The literacy rate of the village stands at 96.38% which is higher than the state average 76.94%. Male literacy rate stands at 98.51% while female literacy rate was 94.09%.

== People and occupation ==
The village is home to people of Tangkhul Naga tribe. Majority of the inhabitants are Christians. Agriculture is the primary occupation of the inhabitants. Being a remote village, the inhabitants are deprived of good transportation system. The inter village road constructed under PMGSY most often fails to meet the transportation requirements.
