= Ningthi, Ukhrul =

Ningthi
- Village
- Location in Manipur, India Ningthi (India)
- Coordinates: 24°59′31″N 94°25′54″E
- Country: India
- State: Manipur
- District: Kamjong

Population
  - Total: 926

Languages
  - Official: Tangkhul Ningthi Tui
- Time zone: UTC+5:30 (IST)
- PIN: 795145
- Vehicle registration: MN
- Nearest city: Ukhrul Imphal
- Literacy: 93.38%
- Lok Sabha constituency: Outer Manipur
- Vidhan Sabha constituency: Phungyar
- Website: manipur.gov.in

Ningthi is a village located west of Kamjong in Kamjong district, Manipur state, India. The village is about 20 kilometers from Kamjong and is partially connected by Ukhrul-Kamjong State highway and inter village road constructed in 2015. Ningthi is flanked by Kamjong in the east, Phungyar in the west, Tusom in the south and Hangkau in the north. Ningthi river is the main tributary of Chindwin river of Myanmar.

== Total population ==
According to 2011 census, Ningthi has 175 households with the total of 926 people of which 465 are male and 461 are female. Of the total population, 140 were in the age group of 0–6 years. The average sex ratio of the village is 991 female to 1000 male which is higher than the state average of 985. The literacy rate of the village stands at 93.38% which is higher than the state average 76.94%. Male literacy rate stands at 97.04% while female literacy rate was 89.47%.

== People and occupation ==
The village is home to people of Tangkhul Naga tribe. Majority of the inhabitants are Christians. Agriculture is the primary occupation of the inhabitants. The village is known in the district for its natural environment, flora and fauna. Age old mass fishing using indigenous herbs is still practiced in Ningthi during the month on May. A documentary film titled Kungyee was made on the traditional fishing of Ningthi and it was premiered at Aperture Festival at Melbourne in 2013.
