= Hangkau =

Hangkau Hangkou
- Village
- Location in Manipur, India Hangkau (India)
- Coordinates: 24°53′54″N 94°24′31″E
- Country: India
- State: Manipur
- District: Ukhrul

Population
  - Total: 312

Languages
  - Official: Tangkhul Hangkau Tui
- Time zone: UTC+5:30 (IST)
- PIN: 795142
- Vehicle registration: MN
- Nearest city: Ukhrul Imphal
- Literacy: 88.64%
- Lok Sabha constituency: Outer Manipur
- Vidhan Sabha constituency: Phungyar

Hangkau (also spelled as Hangkou) is a village located southeast of Ukhrul in Ukhrul district, Manipur state, India. The village is about 90 kilometers from Ukhrul and is partially connected by Ukhrul-Kamjong State highway and inter village road constructed in 2014. Hangkau is flanked by Kamjong in the east, Godah in the west, Ningthi in the south and Yengtem in the north.

== Total population ==
According to 2011 census, Hangkaw has 66 households with the total of 312 people of which 144 are male and 168 are female. Of the total population, 39 were in the age group of 0–6 years. The average sex ratio of the village is 1167 female to 1000 male which is higher than the state average of 985. The literacy rate of the village stands at 88.64% which is higher than the state average 76.94%. Male literacy rate stands at 95.31% while female literacy rate was 82.76%.

== People and occupation ==
The village is home to people of Tangkhul Naga tribe. Majority of the inhabitants are Christians. Agriculture is the primary occupation of the inhabitants.
