= Godah, Ukhrul =

Godah Hundung Godah
- Village
- Location in Manipur, India Godah (India)
- Coordinates: 24°53′49″N 94°21′02″E
- Country: India
- State: Manipur
- District: Ukhrul

Population
  - Total: 336

Languages
  - Official: Tangkhul Godah Tui
- Time zone: UTC+5:30 (IST)
- PIN: 795142
- Vehicle registration: MN
- Nearest city: Ukhrul Imphal
- Literacy: 82.14%
- Lok Sabha constituency: Outer Manipur
- Vidhan Sabha constituency: Phungyar

Godah, also called Hundung, is a village located south of Ukhrul in the Ukhrul district, Manipur State, India. The village falls under the Phungyar subdivision. The village is approximately 70 kilometers from Ukhrul and is partially connected by Ukhrul-Phungyar State highway. Godah is bordered by Hangkau in the east, Shingkap in the west, Alang in the south and Shangshak in the north.

== Population ==
According to 2011 census, Godah has 76 households with a 336 people. 158 are male and 178 are female. Of the total population, 56 were in the age group of 0–6 years. The average sex ratio of the village is 1127 female to 1000 male, which is higher than the state average of 985. The village's literacy rate is 82.14%, which is higher than the 76.94% state average. The literacy rate for men is 88.28%, compared to 76.97% for women.

== People and Occupations ==
The village is home to people of Tangkhul Naga tribe. The majority of the inhabitants are Christians. Most of the inhabitants are employed in agriculture.
