= Langli, Ukhrul =

Langli
- Village
- Location in Manipur, India Langli (India)
- Coordinates: 24°57′24″N 94°30′30″E
- Country: India
- State: Manipur
- District: Ukhrul

Population
  - Total: 323

Languages
  - Official: Tangkhul (Langli tui)
- Time zone: UTC+5:30 (IST)
- PIN: 795142
- Vehicle registration: MN
- Nearest city: Ukhrul Imphal
- Literacy: 82.39%
- Lok Sabha constituency: Outer Manipur
- Vidhan Sabha constituency: Phungyar
- Website: manipur.gov.in

Langli is a village located southeast of Ukhrul in Ukhrul district, Manipur state, India. The village is about 60 kilometers from Ukhrul and is partially connected by Ukhrul-Kamjong State highway. The village is flanked by Maku in the north, Kamjong village in the south, the Chatric in the east and Apong in the west. The village is divided into two major parts with separate settlements; Langli K and R Langli.

== Total population ==
According to 2011 census, Langli has 61 households with the total of 323 people of which 170 are male and 153 are female. Of the total population, 39 were in the age group of 0–6 years. The average sex ratio of the village is 900 female to 1000 male which is lower than the state average of 985. The literacy rate of the village stands at 82.39% which is lower than the state average 76.94%. Male literacy rate stands at 91.28% while female literacy rate was 72.59%.

== People and occupation ==
The village is home to people of Tangkhul Naga tribe. Majority of the inhabitants are Christians. Agriculture is the primary occupation of the inhabitants. Being a remote village, the inhabitants are deprived of good transportation system. The inter village road constructed under PMGSY most often fails to meet the transportation requirements.
