= Nungshong =

- Village
- Location in Manipur, India Nungshong (India)
- Coordinates: 25°03′00″N 94°23′34″E
- Country: India
- State: Manipur
- District: Ukhrul

Population
  - Total: 784

Languages
  - Official: Tangkhul (Nungshong tui)
- Time zone: UTC+5:30 (IST)
- PIN: 795142
- Vehicle registration: MN
- Nearest city: Ukhrul Kohima
- Literacy: 91.09%
- Lok Sabha constituency: Outer Manipur
- Vidhan Sabha constituency: Ukhrul
- Website: manipur.gov.in

Nungshong Khullen is located south of Ukhrul in Ukhrul district, Manipur state, India. The village is about 30 kilometers from Ukhrul via the state highway that connects Ukhrul-Kamjong via Shangshak. The shorter un-metalled road from Ukhrul to Nungshong khullen is about 15 kilometers. Construction of a new road under PMGSY to connect the neighboring villages with Ukhrul is underway for which there were reports of irregularities on the part of the executing agencies. Nungshong is flanked by Hungpung in the west, Shangching in the south, Choithar and Khangkhui in the north. Locally, the residents speak Nungshong dialect which belongs to the Tibeto-Burman language family.

== Total population ==
According to 2011 census, Nungshong Khullen has 93 households with the total of 488 people of which 242 are male and 246 are female. Of the total population, 44 were in the age group of 0–6 years. The average sex ratio of the village is 1017 female to 1000 male which is higher than the state average of 985. The literacy rate of the village stands at 59.68%. Male literacy rate stands at 67.29% while female literacy rate was 52.61%.

The total number of households of Nungshong Khunou according to 2011 census 57 with the total of 260 people of which 120 are male and 140 are female. Of the total population, 23 were in the age group of 0–6 years. The average sex ratio of the village is 1167 female to 1000 male which is higher than the state average of 985. The literacy rate of the village stands at 94.94%. Male literacy rate stands at 98.23% while female literacy rate was 91.94%.

== People and occupation ==
The village is home to people of Tangkhul Naga tribe. Majority of the inhabitants are Christians. Agriculture is the primary occupation of the inhabitants. Nungshong is one of the 44 villages considered likely to be affected as a catchment area when the Mapithel multi purpose is finally functional.
