= Maku, Ukhrul =

Maku Maka
- Village
- Location in Manipur, India Maku (India)
- Coordinates: 24°58′41″N 94°29′28″E
- Country: India
- State: Manipur
- District: Ukhrul

Government
  - Type: Panchayati raj (India)
  - Body: Gram panchayat

Population
  - Total: 635

Languages
  - Official: Tangkhul (Maku tui)
- Time zone: UTC+5:30 (IST)
- PIN: 795142
- Vehicle registration: MN
- Nearest city: Ukhrul Imphal
- Literacy: 79.58%
- Lok Sabha constituency: Outer Manipur
- Vidhan Sabha constituency: Phungyar
- Website: manipur.gov.in

Maku is a village located south east of Ukhrul in Ukhrul district, Manipur state, India. The village is about 32 kilometers from Ukhrul and is partially connected by National Highway 150 that connects Imphal and Kohima via Ukhrul and Jessami and Kamjong-Imphal state highway. The village is flanked by Shingcha in the north, Langli in the south, Chatric in the east and Yengtem in the west. Maku is a major and strategic junction for the neighboring remote village as the state highway and Inter Village Roads (IVR) converges in the vicinity of the village. Locally, the inhabitants speak Maku tui which belongs to the Tibeto-Burman language family.

== Total population ==
According to the 2011 census, Maku has 126 households with a total of 635 people of which 325 are male and 310 are female. Of the total population, 86 were in the age group of 0–6 years. The average sex ratio of the village is 954 female to 1000 males which is lower than the state average of 985. The literacy rate of the village stands at 95.81% which is higher than the state average of 76.94%. Male literacy rate stands at 95.22% while female literacy rate was 96.39%.

== People and occupation ==
The village is home to people of Tangkhul Naga tribe. Majority of the inhabitants are Christians. Agriculture is the primary occupation of the inhabitants.
