= Skipe =

- Village
- Location in Manipur, India Skipe (India)
- Coordinates: 24°38′24″N 94°30′40″E
- Country: India
- State: Manipur
- District: Kamjong

Population
  - Total: 123

Languages
  - Official: Tangkhul Skipe tui
- Time zone: UTC+5:30 (IST)
- PIN: 795142
- Vehicle registration: MN
- Nearest city: Ukhrul Imphal
- Literacy: 89.47%
- Lok Sabha constituency: Outer Manipur
- Vidhan Sabha constituency: Phungyar
- Website: manipur.gov.in

Skipe is a border village on the side of India in the Indo-Myanmar international border. The village is located south of Ukhrul in Ukhrul district, Manipur state, India. Skipe falls under Kamjong sub division. The village is partially connected by Ukhrul-Kamjong state highway. Skipe is flanked by Chindwin river in the east, Konkan Thana in the north, Kangpat in the west and Namlee in the south. Locally, the inhabitants speak Skipe dialect that belongs to the Tibeto-Burman language family. Some researchers are of the view that the dialect spoken by the inhabitants has some affinity to that of the Koireng tribe.

== Total population ==
According to 2011 census, Skipe has 24 households with the total of 123 people of which 59 are male and 64 are female. Of the total population, 24 were in the age group of 0–6 years. The average sex ratio of the village is 1085 female to 1000 male which is higher than the state average 985. The literacy rate of the village stands at 61.72% which is lower than the state average 76.94%. Male literacy rate stands at 63.23% while female literacy rate was 57.24%.

== People and occupation ==
The village is home to people of Tangkhul Naga tribe. Majority of the inhabitants are Christians. Agriculture is the primary occupation of the inhabitants. Being a remote area, the village is often in the news for the poor transport system due to bad road condition and the inhabitants suffer most during the rainy season because of frequent landslides. The village is often used as transit route by militants for which there are frequent encounters between the Indian arm force and militant groups. There had been many incidents of incursion of land by the Myanmar army and Skipe is one of the villages that has lost some of its original land due to illegal encroachment by the neighbouring country. Moreover, there has been reports of border pillar disappearance.
