= Bungpa =

- Village
- Location in Manipur, India Bungpa (India)
- Coordinates: 24°48′56″N 94°29′35″E
- Country: India
- State: Manipur
- District: Ukhrul

Population
  - Total: 3,025

Languages
  - Official: Tangkhul Bungpa Tou
- Time zone: UTC+5:30 (IST)
- PIN: 795142
- Vehicle registration: MN
- Nearest city: Ukhrul Imphal
- Literacy: 93.06%
- Lok Sabha constituency: Outer Manipur
- Vidhan Sabha constituency: Phungyar

Bungpa is a generic reference to two villages, Bungpa Khullen and Bungpa Khunou located south of Ukhrul in Ukhrul district, Manipur state, India. The village falls under Kamjong sub division. The villages are connected by Ukhrul-Kamjong state highway. Bungpa is flanked by Phungyar in the west, Grihang in the south, Lakhan in the east and Kamjong in the north. Locally, the inhabitants speak Bungpa dialect that belongs to the Tibeto-Burman language family.

== Total population ==
According to 2011 census, Bungpa Khullen has 422 households with the total of 2716 people of which 1632 are male and 1084 are female. Of the total population, 280 were in the age group of 0–6 years. The average sex ratio of the Bungpa Khullen village is 664 female to 1000 male which is lower than the state average of 985. The literacy rate of the village stands at 90.64% which is higher than the state average 76.94%. Male literacy rate stands at 94.52% while female literacy rate was 84.45%.

According to 2011 census, Bungpa Khunou has 45 households with the total of 309 people of which 172 are male and 137 are female. Of the total population, 34 were in the age group of 0–6 years. The average sex ratio of the Bungpa Khunou village is 797 female to 1000 male which is lower than the state average of 985. The literacy rate of the village stands at 93.09% which is higher than the state average 76.94%. Male literacy rate stands at 96.05% while female literacy rate was 89.43%.

== People and occupation ==
The village is home to people of Tangkhul Naga tribe. Majority of the inhabitants are Christians. Agriculture is the primary occupation of the inhabitants. Rishang Keishing, a veteran politician among the Tangkhuls and former Chief Minister of Manipur and former Member of Parliament hails from Bungpa village.
