= Leishiyo Keishing =

Indian politician

Legislator

Member of the Manipur Legislative Assembly
- Incumbent
- Assumed office 2017
- Preceded by: Victor Keishing
- Constituency: Phungyar

Personal details
- Born: 1 March 1974 (age 52) Nambashi Horton Ukhrul, India
- Party: Naga People's Front (NPF)
- Occupation: Politician

Leishiyo Keishing, or K. Leishiyo, is a Naga politician from Manipur, India. He was elected from Phungyar Assembly Constituency in 2017 and 2022 as a Naga People's Front (NPF) candidate in the Manipur Legislative Assembly and served as chairman of its Hill Area Committee (HAC) from 2020 until 2022.

== Early life ==
Keishing, born on 1 March 1974 is the eldest of the 4 sons of Mr. Samphang Keishing and Mrs. Martha Ningshen of Nambashi Horton village in Kamjong district, Manipur. He completed a BE (Electrical) from MIT, Muzaffarpur, a postgraduate diploma in thermal power plant engineering from the National Power Training Institute (NPTI), and an MBA in Human Resource Management. After completing his studies, he briefly worked as a mathematics teacher at Nambashi High School and Ukhrul Public School. He served as manager (electrical) for the J&K "Rail Link Project" under Indian Railway Construction (IRCON). From 2010, he worked with the Central Public Works Department (CPWD) as an engineer (electrical) until 2016, when he voluntarily resigned from the job to contest in the Manipur Assembly Elections.

== Political career ==
In an exclusive interview with AJA, a Tangkhul vernacular daily, Leishiyo Keishing stated that he entered politics with the main objective of serving the people at his prime age and not after superannuation, as many people opt to do. In the 11th Manipur Assembly General Elections, he contested as a Naga People's Front (NPF) candidate and won the race, beating his nearest rival, Somi Awungshi of the BJP, by a huge margin of 4778 votes. Leishiyo Keishing was initially inducted as a Parliamentary Secretary in the BJP-led Coalition Government of Manipur until the position was scrubbed in 2018. The political tide within the BJP-led coalition was on a bumpy path when the NPF "In Principle" decided to pull out of the coalition in the run up to the Lok Sabha Elections in May 2019. The decision was, however, withdrawn after due consultations.

In 2019, he toured the remotest border villages within his constituency and pointed out that no development work had been undertaken in Phungyar Assembly Constituency for the past 20 years. He also lamented the disparity between the funds allocated for development in the valley constituencies and those in the hills. Phungyar Assembly Constituency, according to Leishiyo Keishing, is larger than the whole area covered by the 40 constituencies in the valley. However, the annual developmental fund allocated is a meagre 2 crore INR, equivalent to the amount allocated to Singjamei AC, the smallest Assembly Constituency in Manipur. The poor condition of the constituency in terms of road connectivity and electrification, according to Leishiyo Keishing, will hopefully change with the implementation of various state and centrally sponsored programs.
