= Choithar =

Choithar village
- Village
- Location in Manipur, India Choithar village (India)
- Coordinates: 25°04′39″N 94°23′50″E
- Country: India
- State: Manipur
- District: Ukhrul

Population
  - Total: 1,392

Languages
  - Official: Tangkhul (Rithar/Choithar)
- Time zone: UTC+5:30 (IST)
- PIN: 795142
- Vehicle registration: MN
- Nearest city: Ukhrul Kohima
- Literacy: 86.34%
- Lok Sabha constituency: Outer Manipur
- Vidhan Sabha constituency: Ukhrul
- Website: manipur.gov.in

Choithar (Rithar) is a village located east of Ukhrul in Ukhrul district, Manipur state, India. The village is 12 kilometers from Ukhrul. National Highway 150 Imphal-Kohima via Jessami partially connects the village. The village is about 6 kilometers from the National highway connected earlier by an old British road. There was a proposal to construct a new road under PMGSY for which there were reports of discrepancies on the part of the executing agencies. Choithar is flanked by Ukhrul in the west, Choithar in the north, Nungshong in the south and Khangkhui in the east.

== Total population ==
According to 2011 census, Choithar has 258 households with the total of 1392 people of which 717 are male and 675 are female. Of the total population, 199 were in the age group of 0–6 years. The average sex ratio of the village is 941 female to 1000 male which is lower than the state average of 985. The literacy rate of the village stands at 86.34%. Male literacy rate stands at 88.78% while female literacy rate was 83.74%.

== People and occupation ==
The village is home to people of Tangkhul Naga tribe. Majority of the inhabitants are Christians. Agriculture is the primary occupation of the inhabitants. The village was in the news recently for the spread of a mysterious pine tree disease that affected large area of the village forest. Choithar is one of the 44 villages considered likely to be affected as a catchment area when the Mapithel multi purpose is finally functional. In 2013, Reingamphy Awungshi, a girl from this village was found mysteriously murdered in her rented apartment in Delhi for which there was a great public uproar and protests both in the National capital and in the state of Manipur.
