= Riha, Manipur =

Riha
- Village
- Location in Manipur, India Riha (India)
- Coordinates: 24°54′09″N 94°08′50″E
- Country: India
- State: Manipur
- District: Phungyar

Government
  - Type: Panchayati raj (India)
  - Body: Gram panchayat

Population
  - Total: 1,087

Languages
  - Official: Tangkhul
- Time zone: UTC+5:30 (IST)
- PIN: 795142
- Vehicle registration: MN
- Nearest city: Ukhrul Imphal
- Literacy: 91.29%
- Lok Sabha constituency: Outer Manipur
- Vidhan Sabha constituency: Phungyar
- Website: manipur.gov.in

Riha is a Tangkhul village in Kamjong district, Manipur state, India. The village falls under Phungyar sub division. The village is partially connected by National Highway 150 that connects Jessami and Imphal. Riha is flanked by Thoyee in the North, Nongdam in the South, Yaingangpokpi in the west and Shingkap in the east. Locally, the inhabitants speak tangkhul dialect that belongs to the Tibeto-Burman language family.

== Total population ==
According to 2011 census, Riha comprises 264 households with the total of 1087 people. The average sex ratio of the village is 897 female to 1000 male which is lower than Manipur state average of 985. Literacy rate of Riha is 91.29% with male literacy rate at 92.60% and female literacy rate at 89.93%.

== People and occupation ==
The village is home to people of Tangkhul Naga tribe. Majority of the inhabitants are Christians. Agriculture is the primary occupation of the inhabitants. Most of the arable land in the village got submerged after commissioning of the Mapithel dam since Riha is one of the closest upstream villages. Moreover, most of the residents had to relocate to higher ground before commissioning of the dam. The village for now has become a tourist destination who mainly visit for sightseeing, fishing and camping by the dam. The residents are coming up with innovative ideas to attract tourist like setting up a floating restaurant on the dam.
