= Nongdam =

- Village
- Location in Manipur, India Nongdam (India)
- Country: India
- State: Manipur
- District: Sowombung

Government
  - Type: Panchayati raj (India)
  - Body: Gram panchayat

Population
  - Total: 850

Languages
  - Official: Manipuri, Tangkhul
- Time zone: UTC+5:30 (IST)
- PIN: 795001
- Vehicle registration: MN
- Nearest city: Imphal
- Literacy: 70.44%
- Lok Sabha constituency: Outer Manipur
- Vidhan Sabha constituency: Sowumbung
- Website: manipur.gov.in

Nongdam is a village in Imphal East district, Manipur state, India. The village falls under the Sowombung sub division. The village is partially connected by National Highway 202 that connects Jessami and Imphal. Nongdam is flanked by Leishiphung in the west, Itham in the south, Chadong in the east and Riha in the north. (Provide info in a detailed manner) (Stop biased proclaims)

== Total population ==
According to the 2011 census, Nongdam comprises 178 households with a total of 850 people. The average sex ratio of the village is 1024 female to 1000 male which is higher than Manipur state average of 985. Literacy rate of Nongdam is 70.44% with male literacy rate at 83.38% and female literacy rate at 57.91%.

== People and occupation ==
The village is home to group of communities. Majority of the inhabitants are Christian and Sanamahis. Agriculture is the primary occupation of the inhabitants. The village is known in the district for its reserve natural environment, flora and fauna. Nongdam is a village located downstream of the Mapithel Dam and is one of the adversely affected villages post commissioning of the multi-purpose project.
