= Streptomyces hundungensis =

Scientific classification
- Domain: Bacteria
- Kingdom: Bacillati
- Phylum: Actinomycetota
- Class: Actinomycetes
- Order: Streptomycetales
- Family: Streptomycetaceae
- Genus: Streptomyces
- Species: S. hundungensis

Binomial name
- Streptomyces hundungensis Nimaichand et al. 2013

Type strain
- JCM 17577, KCTC 29125, MBRL 251

Species of bacterium

Streptomyces hundungensis is a bacterium species from the genus of Streptomyces which has been isolated from a quarry in Tangkhul Hundung in Manipur in India Streptomyces hundungensis has antifungal activity.

== See also ==
- List of Streptomyces species
