= 2011 Tirap ambush =

Battle in the NSCN Internecine Conflict

2011 Tirap Ambush
- Part of the Naga Interfactional Conflicts within the Insurgency in Nagaland, Insurgency in Northeast India
Date	24–25 February 2011
Location	Indo-Myanmar Border, Tirap District, Arunachal Pradesh, India
Result	NSCN-K victory

Belligerents
NSCN-K	NSCN-IM

Strength
Unknown	100+

Casualties and losses
5+ killed	30+ killed

The 2011 Tirap Ambush was a violent clash within the National Socialist Council of Nagaland (NSCN) between the NSCN--Isak Muivah (NSCN-IM) and the NSCN--Khaplang (NSCN-K) militant groups on the Indo-Myanmar border of Tirap district, in Eastern Arunachal Pradesh, India.

== Background ==
In 2010, reconciliation attempts by the Federal Government of Nagaland/ Naga National Council had resulted in a large drop in fatalities in the NSCN Internecine Conflict. However, starting in December 2010, an escalation in the conflict began for unclear reasons.

On 27 December 110 NSCN-K militants attacked an NSCN-IM post at Khamlang village in the Changlang District of Arunachal Pradesh, killing at least two NSCN-IM cadres and injuring 5. Following this, numerous other clashes occurred in the district, with violence spilling over into neighboring Tirap district as well.

== Ambush ==
On the night of 24 February 2011, some 100 NSCN-IM cadres crossing into Tirap from Myanmar's Sagaing region were ambushed by NSCN-K forces. The clash lasted into 25 February, and ultimately resulted in the NSCN-IM being repulsed from the area. At least 30 NSCN-IM cadres were killed, and an unknown number were injured. At least 5 NSCN-K cadres were killed in the clash as well. Neither side made any detailed report of the incident; its first mention occurred in Indian intelligence reports weeks after the incident.

== Aftermath ==
Following this incident, the rate of conflict between the two sides increased significantly. The day after the ambush, on 26 February, a clash broke out in Myanmar where at least 2 NSCN-K militants were injured. The deterioration in the NSCN-IM's strength following these clashes, as well as the general turmoil regarding the outfit, may have played a role in the creation of the Zelianrong United Front (ZUF) by disgruntled NSCN-IM cadres the same day as the clash on the 25th. The ZUF has been known to often collaborate with the NSCN-K in attacks against the NSCN-IM. Near constant gunfights between the two factions continued till at least the 28th, leading to an unknown number of casualties on both sides. Notable clashes with heavy casualties would be reported on 13 July (the Kothin Clash), 7 October (the Battle of Leishok), 18 October, and 10 November of that year, with dozens of smaller gunfights occurring between these dates as well. The total number of casualties on either side in these clashes has never been specified. The NSCN internecine conflict continues to the present.
