= Sorde, Manipur =

Sorde
- Village
- Location in Manipur, India Sorde (India)
- Coordinates: 24°43′05″N 94°21′42″E
- Country: India
- State: Manipur
- District: Ukhrul

Government
  - Type: Panchayati raj (India)
  - Body: Gram panchayat

Population
  - Total: 265

Languages
  - Official: Tangkhul Sorde tui
- Time zone: UTC+5:30 (IST)
- PIN: 795142
- Vehicle registration: MN
- Nearest city: Ukhrul Imphal
- Literacy: 98.17%
- Lok Sabha constituency: Outer Manipur
- Vidhan Sabha constituency: Phungyar
- Website: manipur.gov.in

Sorde is a village located south-west of Kamjong in Kamjong District, Manipur state, India. The village falls under Phungyar sub division. The village is partially connected by Ukhrul-Phungyar state highway and Shangshak-Yairipok district road. Sorde is flanked by Khamlang in the west, Punge in the south, Kangpat in the east and Phungyar in the north. Locally, the inhabitants speak Sorde dialect that belongs to the Tibeto-Burman language family.

== Total population ==
According to 2011 census, Sorde has 59 households with the total of 265 people of which 137 are male and 128 are female. Of the total population, 24 were in the age group of 0–6 years. The average sex ratio of the village is 934 female to 1000 male which is lower than the state average of 985. The literacy rate of the village stands at 68.88% which is lower than the state average 76.94%. Male literacy rate stands at 77.42% while female literacy rate was 59.83%.

== People and occupation ==
The village is home to people of Tangkhul Naga tribe. Agriculture is the primary occupation and the majority of the inhabitants is Christian. The village is known in the district for its reserve natural environment, flora and fauna. Being a remote village, the village has a relatively poor transport system and bad road condition, and the inhabitants suffer most during the rainy season because of frequent landslides.
