= Itham =

- Village
- Location in Manipur, India Itham (India)
- Coordinates: 24°44′26″N 94°20′25″E
- Country: India
- State: Manipur
- District: Kamjong

Government
  - Type: Panchayati raj (India)
  - Body: Gram panchayat

Population
  - Total: 240

Languages
  - Official: Tangkhul
- Time zone: UTC+5:30 (IST)
- PIN: 795142
- Vehicle registration: MN
- Nearest city: Ukhrul Imphal
- Literacy: 93.85%
- Lok Sabha constituency: Outer Manipur
- Vidhan Sabha constituency: Phungyar
- Website: manipur.gov.in

Itham originally and locally called Nungha is an under-populated Tangkhul village in Kamjong District, Manipur state, India. It was previously under Ukhrul District. The village falls under Kasom subdivision. The village can be connected by National Highway 102A that connects Ramva̱ (Lambui)-Yairipok via Hongbei village. Also, it connects Imphal via Nongdam village. Itham share boundaries with Tangkhul Hundung village in the north, Bohoram village in the east and south and Nongdam village in the west. It is situated 16 km away from kasom khullen sub-district headquarter and approximately 60 km away from Ukhrul headquarter with the route passing through Lungphu, Shingta, Marou, Shingkap and Tangkhul Hundung village. The village is well known for its fresh organic vegetable shops by the roadside with no shopkeeper.

== Total population ==
According to 2011 census, Itham comprises 48 households with the total of 240 people. The average sex ratio of the village is 1087 female to 1000 male which is higher than Manipur state average of 985. Literacy rate of Itham is 93.85% with male literacy rate at 96.84% and female literacy rate at 91%.

== People and occupation ==
Itham is a Christian village. The village is home to people of Tangkhul Naga tribe. The people are friendly. While agriculture is the primary occupation of the inhabitants, the village has produced fairly good number of white-collar job workers and educated youths. Locally, the inhabitants speak Itham dialect, yet the younger generation also commonly speak Tangkhul dialect. The village is known in the district for its reserve natural environment, flora and fauna and also for natural streams. It has large densely forested areas with rich population of wild animals and birds. Very commonly sighting are the wild-boars, variety of wild cats, porcupines, squirrels, jungle fowl, wild chickens and variety of birds.
