= Ningchou =

- Village
- Location in Manipur, India Ningchou (India)
- Coordinates: 24°45′03″N 94°29′59″E
- Country: India
- State: Manipur
- District: Ukhrul district

Population
  - Total: 417

Languages
  - Official: Tangkhul
- Time zone: UTC+5:30 (IST)
- PIN: 795142
- Vehicle registration: MN
- Nearest city: Ukhrul Imphal
- Literacy: 99.45%
- Lok Sabha constituency: Outer Manipur
- Vidhan Sabha constituency: Phungyar
- Website: manipur.gov.in

Ningchou is a village south of Ukhrul in the Ukhrul district, Manipur, India. The village falls under Kamjong sub division. Ningchou is connected by Ukhrul-Kamjong state highway. It is flanked by Patbung in the west, Nambisha in the south, Kongkan in the east and Kamjong in the north. Locally, the inhabitants speak the Ningchou dialect that belongs to the Tibeto-Burman language family. The dialect may have some affinity to the Koireng language.

The Indian government's paramilitary Assam Rifles fought members of the separatist People's Liberation Army of Manipur near Ningchou on 8 February 2014.

== Population ==
According to 2011 census, Ningchou has 71 households with the total of 419 people of which 209 are male and 210 are female. Of the total population, 55 were in the age group of 0–6 years. The average sex ratio of the village is 1005 female to 1000 male, which is higher than the state average 985. The literacy rate of the village stands at 99.45%, which is higher than the state average 76.94%. Male literacy rate stands at 100%, while female literacy rate was 98.88%.
