= Kachowhallan =

- Village
- Country: India
- State: Jammu and Kashmir
- District: Kulgam

Languages
  - Official: Kashmiri, Urdu, Hindi, Dogri, English
- Time zone: UTC+5:30 (IST)
- PIN: 192 102
- Telephone code: 01932
- Vehicle registration: JK 18

Kachowhallan is a village in Kulgam district, in the union territory of Jammu and Kashmir, India. The village has approximately 100 houses with a population of about 1000. A road from the village of Okey to Kachowhallan was built by Pradhan Mantri Gram Sadak Yojana. There is a public middle school in the village. The primary source of income is from Apple Business. There is also a grave of the saint Sayed Kawsar near the local graveyard.
