= Chadong =

Chadong may refer to:

- Chadong language, a language of China
- Chadong Township, a subdivision of Lingui District, China
- Chadong, Manipur, a village in India
