= Pushing Ukhrul =

Pushing Chingshou
- Village
- Location in Manipur, India Pushing (India)
- Coordinates: 25°03′12″N 94°28′59″E
- Country: India
- State: Manipur
- District: Ukhrul

Population
  - Total: 904

Languages
  - Official: Tangkhul (Pushing tui)
- Time zone: UTC+5:30 (IST)
- PIN: 795142
- Vehicle registration: MN
- Nearest city: Ukhrul Imphal
- Literacy: 79.58%
- Lok Sabha constituency: Outer Manipur
- Vidhan Sabha constituency: Phungyar

Pushing is a village located south east of Ukhrul in Ukhrul district, Manipur state, India. The village is about 32 kilometers from Ukhrul and is partially connected by National Highway 150 that connects Imphal and Kohima via Ukhrul and Jessami and Kamjong-Imphal state highway. The village is flanked by Mapum in the north, Gamnom in the south, Ronshak in the east and Khangkhui in the west. Locally, the inhabitants speak Pushing tui which belongs to the Tibeto-Burman language family.

== Total population ==
According to 2011 census, Pushing has 151 households with the total of 904 people of which 461 are male and 443 are female. Of the total population, 160 were in the age group of 0–6 years. The average sex ratio of the village is 961 female to 1000 male which is lower than the state average of 985. The literacy rate of the village stands at 81.32% which is higher than the state average 76.94%. Male literacy rate stands at 87.93% while female literacy rate was 74.38%.

== People and occupation ==
The village is home to people of Tangkhul Naga tribe. Majority of the inhabitants are Christians. Agriculture is the primary occupation of the inhabitants.
