= Kangpat =

- Village
- Interactive map of Kangpat
- Location in Manipur, India Kangpat (India)
- Coordinates: 24.6728°N 94.4705°E
- Country: India
- State: Manipur
- District: Kamjong

Population
  - Total: 791

Languages
  - Official: Tangkhul Kangpat tui
- Time zone: UTC+5:30 (IST)
- PIN: 795142
- Vehicle registration: MN
- Nearest city: Ukhrul Imphal
- Literacy: 93.93%
- Lok Sabha constituency: Outer Manipur
- Vidhan Sabha constituency: Phungyar
- Website: manipur.gov.in

Kangpat is a generic reference to two villages, Kangpat Khullen and Kangpat Khunou, located south of Kamjong district, Manipur state, India. The two villages are connected by Ukhrul–Kamjong state highway. Kangpat is flanked by Sorbung and Punge in the west, Choro in the south, Skipe in the east and Nambisha in the north. Locally, the inhabitants speak Kangpat dialect that belongs to the Tibeto-Burman language family. Some researchers are of the view that the dialect spoken by the inhabitants has some affinity to that of the Koireng tribe.

== Total population ==
According to 2011 census, Kangpat Khunou has 58 households with the total of 353 people of which 176 are male and 177 are female. Of the total population, 50 were in the age group of 0–6 years. The average sex ratio of the village is 1006 female to 1000 male which is higher than the state average 985. The literacy rate of the village stands at 61.72% which is lower than the state average 76.94%. Male literacy rate stands at 63.23% while female literacy rate was 57.24%.

According to 2011 census, Kangpat Khullen has 78 households with the total of 438 people of which 230 are male and 208 are female. Of the total population, 59 were in the age group of 0–6 years. The average sex ratio of the village is 904 female to 1000 male which is lower than the state average 985. The literacy rate of the village stands at 93.93% which is higher than the state average 76.94%. Male literacy rate stands at 95.45% while female literacy rate was 92.27%.

== People and occupation ==
Kangpat is close to the porous Indo-Myanmar international border and the village is often used as transit route by militants for which there are frequent encounters between the Indian arm force and militant groups. There had been many incidents of incursion of land by the Myanmar army and Kangpat is one of the villages that has lost some of its original land due to illegal encroachment by the neighboring country.
