= Streptomyces muensis =

Scientific classification
- Domain: Bacteria
- Kingdom: Bacillati
- Phylum: Actinomycetota
- Class: Actinomycetia
- Order: Streptomycetales
- Family: Streptomycetaceae
- Genus: Streptomyces
- Species: S. muensis

Binomial name
- Streptomyces muensis Ningthoujam et al. 2014

Type strain
- JCM 17576, KCTC 29124, MBRL 179

Synonyms
- Streptomyces canchipurensis Li et al. 2015

Species of bacterium

Streptomyces muensis is a bacterium species from the genus of Streptomyces which has been isolated from a limestone quarry from Tangkhul Hundung in Manipur in India.

== See also ==
- List of Streptomyces species
