= Chatric =

Chatric Chatrik
- Village
- Location in Manipur, India Chatric (India)
- Coordinates: 24°57′23″N 94°37′10″E
- Country: India
- State: Manipur
- District: Ukhrul

Government
  - Type: Panchayati raj (India)
  - Body: Gram panchayat

Population
  - Total: 854

Languages
  - Official: Tangkhul (Chatric tui)
- Time zone: UTC+5:30 (IST)
- PIN: 795145
- Vehicle registration: MN
- Nearest city: Ukhrul Imphal
- Literacy: 76.94%
- Lok Sabha constituency: Outer Manipur
- Vidhan Sabha constituency: Phungyar
- Website: manipur.gov.in

Chatric, also known as Siyang, is a village located southeast of Kamjong in Kamjong district, Manipur state, India. The village is about 40 kilometers from Kamjong and is partially connected by Ukhrul-Kamjong state highway. The village is flanked by Chamu in the north, Chahong village in the south, the Chindwin river (Myanmar) in the east and Chahong in the west.

Chatric is an Indian border village with Myanmar. Locally, the inhabitants speak Chatric tui which belongs to the Tibeto-Burman language family. The village is divided into two major parts with separate settlements; Chatric Khullen and Chatric Khunou.

== Demographics ==
According to the 2011 census, Chatric has 142 households with the total of 854 people of which 445 are male and 405 are female. Of the total population, 117 were in the age group of 0–6 years. The average sex ratio of the village is 919 female to 1000 male, lower than the state average of 985. The literacy rate of the village stands at 74.22% which is lower than the state average 76.94%. The male literacy rate stands at 80.72% while the female literacy rate was 66.95%.

The village is home to people of Tangkhul Naga tribe. All of the inhabitants are Christians.

== People and economy ==
Agriculture is the primary industry in Chatric. The village has a large span of natural forest stretching till the international border with Myanmar. The village is also well known in the district for the supply of freshwater fish abundantly made available in the local market.

== Notable places ==
The village is also famous for Sivathei (King Chilli). It is learnt that Sivathei, which has unique taste from other varieties of chilli, is originated from Chatric.

The villagers depends mostly on forest resources.

Being a remote village, the inhabitants are deprived of good transportation system. The inter village road constructed under PMGSY most often fails to meet the transportation requirements. The villagers also has to depend on solar lamps and traditional light source due to poor electricity connectivity.
