= Tangkhul Hundung =

- Village
- Location in Manipur, India Tangkhul Hundung (India)
- Coordinates: 24°48′33″N 94°14′36″E
- Country: India
- State: Manipur
- District: Ukhrul

Population
  - Total: 750

Languages
  - Official: Tangkhul (Tangkhul Hundung tui)
- Time zone: UTC+5:30 (IST)
- PIN: 795142
- Vehicle registration: MN
- Nearest city: Ukhrul Imphal
- Literacy: 74.03%
- Lok Sabha constituency: Outer Manipur
- Vidhan Sabha constituency: Phungyar

Tangkhul Hundung is a village south of Ukhrul in Ukhrul district, Manipur, India. The village is about 65 kilometres (40 mi) from Ukhrul and about 45 kilometres (28 mi) from Imphal and is partially connected by National Highway 150 that connects Imphal and Kohima via Ukhrul and Jessami. Tangkhul Hundung is divided into two major parts, Tangkhul Hundung Khullen and Tangkhul Hundung Khunou. The village is flanked by Thoyee in the west, Shingkap in the north, Itham in the south and Alang in the east. Locally, the inhabitants speak Tangkhul Hundung tui, which belongs to the Tibeto-Burman language family.

== Total population ==
According to 2011 census, Tangkhul Hundung Khullen has 138 households with the total of 640 people of which 340 are male and 300 are female. Of the total population, 74 were in the age group of 0–6 years. The average sex ratio of the village is 882 female to 1000 male which is lower than the state average of 985. The literacy rate of the village stands at 86.40% which is higher than the state average 76.94%. Male literacy rate stands at 89.67% while female literacy rate was 82.71%.

According to 2011 census, Tangkhul Hundung Khunao has 49 households with the total of 224 people of which 110 are male and 114 are female. Of the total population, 31 were in the age group of 0–6 years. The average sex ratio of the village is 1036 female to 1000 male which is higher than the state average of 985. The literacy rate of the village stands at 56.99% which is lower than the state average 76.94%. Male literacy rate stands at 60% while female literacy rate was 54.37%.

== People and occupation ==
The village is home to people of Tangkhul Naga tribe. Majority of the inhabitants are Christians. Agriculture is the primary occupation of the inhabitants. Tangkhul Hundung is one of the 44 villages considered likely to be affected as a catchment area when the Mapithel multi purpose project is finally functional.
