= Mapithel Dam =

- Location within Manipur Location within India
- Official name: Thoubal Multipurpose Project
- Country: India
- Location: Kangpokpi district, Kamjong district
- Coordinates: 24.8238°N 94.1421°E
- Purpose: Power, irrigation, drinking water
- Construction began: 1980
- Opening date: December 27, 2020
- Owners: Government of Manipur: 26% NHPC: 74%
- Operator: Loktak Downstream Hydroelectric Corporation Limited

Dam and spillways
- Length: 1,120 m (3,670 ft)
- Website manipur.mygov.in/talk/thoubal-multipurpose-project/

Mapithel Dam or Maphou Dam, officially known as the Thoubal Multipurpose Project, is a dam on the Thoubal river, in the Manipur state of India.

Construction of the dam was met with protests from local communities.

The dam's official inauguration occurred on December 27, 2020 although the drinking water distribution system was not operational.

== Description ==
The dam, on the Thoubal river, is designed to supply 7.5 megawatts of electricity, irrigate 33,449 hectares of land, and supply 10 million gallons of drinking water to Imphal.

The earth dam's design is 1,120 metres long.

The dam is located in the Ukhrul district, 35 kilometres from Imphal, the Manipur state capitol.

Officially known as Thoubal Multipurpose Project, the dam's construction is managed by Loktak Downstream Hydroelectric Corporation Limited, a joint venture of the Government of Manipur and public sector power company NHPC. The government own 26% of the project, the company own 74%.

The dam is expected to flood 2,000 hectares, affecting approximately 8,000 people and the land of six villages, impacting farming and fishing.

2022 cost estimates of the project were Rs 47.25 crore.

== History ==
The project was approved for construction by the local government in May 1980. Targets to open the dam were missed in 1987, 1994, 2002, 2007, 2013, 2015, twice in 2016, 2017 and 2018.

In 2015 protests occurred against the dam and in 2016, Thoyee, Riha and Naga village community members raised concerns about the dam's impact on forestry and community land. Both the Centre for Research and Advocacy and the Committee on Human Rights expressed concern about the dam's impact on the communities. Protest from the local community occurred at Lamlai Khunao village on December 7 2020. Villagers complained that a memorandum of agreement with the Water Resources Department was being breached. The agreement covered solutions to impacts from the dam, including interruptions to their way of life and fishing. Villagers wanted water released and the dam project halted. After a dispute between villagers affected by the dam, the National Green Tribunal found in favour of the villagers, against the government, citing the Forest Rights Act. The government appealed the decision to the Supreme Court in 2018.

During a 2019 drought in Manupur, government officials reported that the dam saved paddy fields. The dam was officially inaugurated on December 27, 2020, despite the water distribution pipework being incomplete and by 2021 still assessed as being over one year short of completion in January 2021. By 2021, holistic impact assessments had not been completed, details on the environmental, ecological cultural, livelihood, social and health impacts were all not fully assessed.

During March 2023 water shortages, The Manipur Public Health Engineering Department stated that the dam would soon be able to provide drinking water to the residents of Imphal. At the time, the dam was reported to be supplying water to the Chingkheiching Forest Reserve and was holding 75 to 80 million cubic feet of water.

== See also ==
- Khuga Dam
