= Punge =

- Village
- Location in Manipur, India Punge (India)
- Coordinates: 24°41′16″N 94°23′33″E
- Country: India
- State: Manipur
- District: Ukhrul

Government
  - Type: Panchayati raj (India)
  - Body: Gram panchayat

Population
  - Total: 220

Languages
  - Official: Tangkhul Punge Tou
- Time zone: UTC+5:30 (IST)
- PIN: 795142
- Vehicle registration: MN
- Nearest city: Ukhrul Imphal
- Literacy: 98.17%
- Lok Sabha constituency: Outer Manipur
- Vidhan Sabha constituency: Phungyar
- Website: manipur.gov.in

Punge is a small village located west of Kamjong in Kamjong District, Manipur state, India. The village falls under Phungyar sub division. The village is partially connected by Ukhrul-Phungyar state highway and Shangshak-Yairipok district road. Punge is flanked by Mawai in the west, Sorbung in the south, Kangpat in the east and Sorde in the north. Locally, the inhabitants speak Punge dialect that belongs to the Tibeto-Burman language family.

== Total population ==
According to 2011 census, Punge has 33 households with the total of 220 people of which 110 are male and 110 are female. Of the total population, 29 were in the age group of 0–6 years. The average sex ratio of the village is 1000 female to 1000 male which is higher than the state average of 985. The literacy rate of the village stands at 56.54% which is lower than the state average 76.94%. Male literacy rate stands at 61.86% while female literacy rate was 51.06%.

== People and occupation ==
The village is home to people of Tangkhul Naga tribe. Majority of the inhabitants are Christians. Agriculture is the primary occupation of the inhabitants. The village is known in the district for its reserve natural environment, flora and fauna. A remote area, the village has a relatively poor transport system and bad road condition, and the inhabitants suffer most during the rainy season because of frequent landslides.
