= Choro, Manipur =

Village in Manipur, India

Choro Choro Khunou, Zingshophai Choro
- Village
- Interactive map of Choro
- Location in Manipur, India Choro (India)
- Coordinates: 24.5757°N 94.4871°E
- Country: India
- State: Manipur
- District: Kamjong

Population (2011)
  - Total: 94

Language(s)
  - Official: Meitei
- Time zone: UTC+5:30 (IST)
- Website: manipur.gov.in

Choro is a village in Kamjong district, Manipur, India, as per the Government of Manipur. The village has a complex and messy history, starting as a small Kuki village in 1947, and suffering displacement during the Kuki–Naga conflict. Its latest incarnation is a Tangkhul Naga village called Zingshophai Choro (Z. Choro), which is apparently in the Kabaw Valley in Myanmar territory, but the Government of Manipur and the civil society organisations of Manipur claim otherwise.

== Geography ==
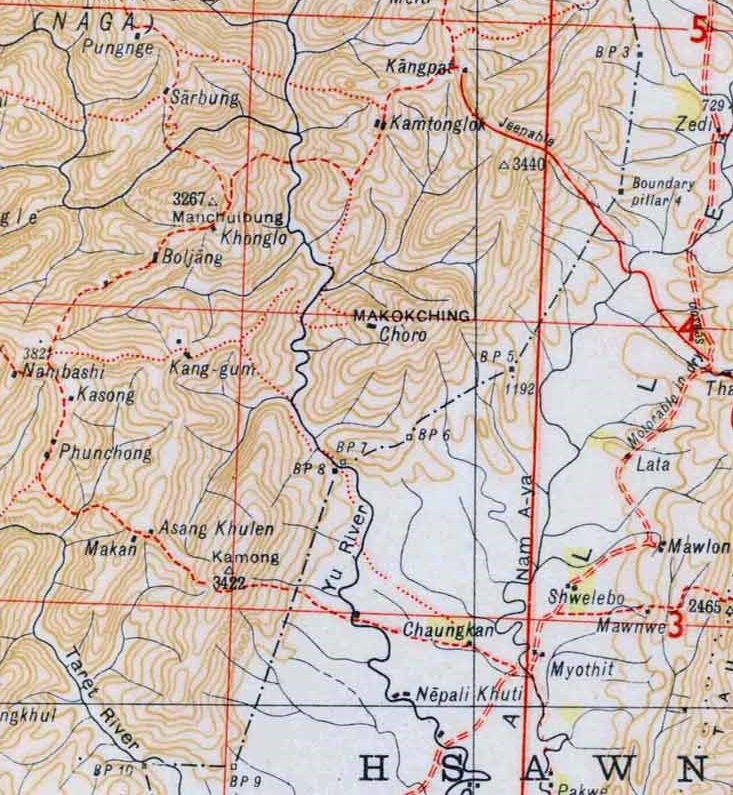
Area around Choro (SoI, 1944)

The Gazetteer of Manipur (1886) mentions a peak called "Choro", 3,440 feet (1,050 m) (24.6506°N 94.5043°E), which is the tallest peak in the area. However, later sources avoid the term "Choro" and simply mention it as Peak 3440. The peak is situated on the bounding mountain range of the Manipur state, called the Yomadong range, beyond which lies the Kabaw Valley, part of Myanmar. The border between Manipur and Kabaw Valley, called the Pemberton Line, runs at the foothills of the Yomadong range. It was demarcated by British Raj in the late 19th century by installing 39 border pillars. The Choro region is in the vicinity of border pillars 4–7. (Note: The border pillars were renumbered in 1967 when India and Myanmar signed border agreement. The new numbers go in the reverse direction. The old border pillar 7 is the new border pillar 93. The old border pillar 4 is the new border pillar 96.) (See map)

To the west of the Yomadong range runs another ridge parallel to it. At its northern tip, there is the village of Kangpat Khullen, which appears to have been called Kamtong in earlier times. (Note: It is possible that "Kamtong" and "Kangpat" are Kuki and Tangkhul names of the same locations.) Two cross-cutting ridges link the two former ridges, joining up at the location of Kangpat (or "Kangpat Centre"). All the ridges together create a bowl, which is drained by a stream called Kamtonglok. The stream debouches into the Maklang River, the largest river in the area, which, after entering the Kabaw Valley, takes the name Yu River. The Choro village is traditionally located within the Kamtonglok bowl.

The "Yomadong range" is not a continuous range, but a chain made up of several stretches of hill ranges. In the present area, to the north of the Maklang River, it is made up of a range called Tapung Lhang, with a peak Makokching, 3,035 feet (925 m) (24.6024°N 94.4752°E), followed by a short range with Peak 3440, and a longer range called Molvailup Inchokaphung further north.

The 1944 survey map shows Choro to be close to the Makokching peak, as does the 2011 census map. The location is to the northwest of a small hillock that was referred to as Choroching in 1896, on which border pillar 6 was placed. (It is marked as Tenseng Moul in Burmese maps).. The Maklang River flows to the south of the hillock as it enters the Kabaw Valley, and the hillock itself extends on both the sides of the border. A village called Choro Khunou appears in Myanmar survey maps to the east of Choroching.

The present-day Manipur government's map of the Kamjong Subdivision shows no village in the Choroching area, but shows one labelled Z. Choro (short for Zingshophai Choro) south of the Peak 3440, near the border with Myanmar. This location is marked as Aloyo on Google maps (24.5885°N 94.4924°E), and is often mentioned as being associated with the Choro village. The real Z. Choro village is located beyond the border, in Myanmar territory, between border pillars 5 and 7. (Note: For example, Google Maps places the Z. Choro Baptist Church at 24.572763°N 94.480349°E.)

== History ==
=== Kuki village ===
The Choro village was listed in the annexure to the 1947 Hill People's Regulation as a Kuki village. It had 8 houses and a chief named Thangkhup. There were also two Kuki villages called Kamtong Khunou and Kamtong Khullen with 18 and 14 houses respectively. (Note: Though there is no firm evidence, it appears that Kamtong Khullen was in the Kamtonglok bowl, whereas Kamtong Khunou was further north.) In 1956, the Choro village was listed as "Choro Kuki". In the 1961 census, the Choro village had 7 households and a population of 50 people, which indicates a reduction in size, possibly due to the Kuki–Naga conflict of the late 1950s. The two Kamtong villages were consolidated into a single Kamtong village with 27 households. By 1991, Choro, was listed as Choro Khullen, with 33 households and a population of 221. However, Kamtong was not listed. This again indicates a consolidation of the two villages, at least for census purposes.

In the 2001 census, both the villages Choro and Kamtong went missing. According to Kuki human rights organisations, both the villages were displaced in the Kuki–Naga clashes of the 1990s. Choro was abandoned on 20 November 1992 and Kamtong on 25 November.

=== Tangkhul village ===
The coupling of villages as "Khullen" and "Khunou" implies a situation of an older village spawning an offshoot village. So the mention of "Choro Khullen" in the 1991 census suggests the spawning of a "Choro Khunou" village, which is not to be found in any census. However a Myanmar survey map dated to 2005 placed a village called Choro Khunou to the east of the Choroching hillock in the territory of Myanmar.

The headman of Choro Khunou, named Kaphungyui Acare, claimed that, in 2006, the Government of Manipur proposed to "barter" the territory of the village, measuring 1.4 square kilometres (0.54 sq mi), with Myanmar in exchange for similar territory near Moreh. He claimed that Choro Khunou and Choro Khullen were under the "jurisdiction of Choro". Choro Khunou was said to be blessed with abundant timbers, rich fertile soil favourable for all types of crops and fruits and beautiful landscape, and it should be retained in India. (Note: As per the Myanmar survey map, this was dissimulation. The land on which Choro Khunou is situated was marked as Myanmar territory since the border was demarcated in 1896. The effort to invoke "Choro Khullen" is also odd since the village had been eliminated in the Kuki–Naga clashes of the 1990s.) In 2013, Tangkhul Naga Long, the apex body of the Tangkhul community, wrote to the Prime Minister of India urging him to abandon the proposal. The Autonomous District Council of Ukhrul district also joined in the chorus, submitting a memorandum to the chief minister of Manipur. A "Committee on Protection of Land in Border Fencing" was formed in August 2013, including the headman of Choro Khunou. Manipur People's Party president N. Sovakiran said a 12-member team of the party had inspected the ongoing border fencing works, and were shocked to see that territory of India had been ceded to Myanmar.

In 2015, the Myanmar Army entered the Choro Khunou village and claimed a 6 km stretch of land as Myanmar territory. It also seized a saw mill and some construction materials. According to another report, the Army personnel dismantled some houses and told the villagers that the land belonged to Myanmar. This was followed by Government of India officials and surveyors visiting the site. The matter was subsequently raised by Assam Rifles with the Myanmar Army, reportedly referring to the "inconsistency between what is seen in the maps and the ground reality".

In 2020, the matter was raised again by Tangkhul Naga Long, referring to the village as Zingshophai Choro. It said it "strongly opposed the State Government's move to gift away [the village] to Myanmar". The headman Acare cited the implementation of developmental activities such as PMGSY, MGNREGS, IWMP etc. as justification for claiming the village in Manipur. There were also reports of similar disputes regarding the border alignment at the neighbouring K. Ashang Khullen Aze village, just south of the Maklang River. However, the Ministry of External Affairs denied that there was any confusion with the border. It said that the border was "settled" as per the India-Myanmar Boundary Agreement, 1967.

== Demography ==
According to 2011 census, the Zingshophai Choro village has a population of 94 people living in 20 households.

In 2020, The Sangai Express reported that the population had grown to 235 people, living in 53 households.

In 2024, the village headman claimed that Zingshophai Choro was a "once-thriving village" with 1,000 households, but it had reduced to about 100 households due to intimidation by Assam Rifles forces.

== Bibliography ==
- Manipur Hill People's (Administration) Regulation, 1947 (PDF), Government of Manipur, 1947
- Ukhrul District Census Handbook, Director of Census Operations, 2011
- Brown, John, ed. (7 January 2026), 83 Quad—63/50k scale—Topo Maps by Survey of India—20260107, Zenodo, doi:10.5281/zenodo.18181382
- Chakravorty, Birendra Chandra (1964), British Relations with the Hill Tribes of Assam since 1858, Calcutta: Firma K.L. Mukhopadhyay – via archive.org
- Dun, E. W. (1992) [1886], Gazetteer of Manipur, Manas Publications – via archive.org
- Ningthouja, Malem (2021), "Disputed Pillars at the Margin of History: Manipur-Myanmar Boundary and India's Strategic Silence", in Chosein Yamahata; Donald M. Seekins; Makiko Takeda (eds.), Social Transformations in India, Myanmar, and Thailand: Volume I: Social, Political and Ecological Perspectives, Singapore: Springer, pp. 377–396
- Phanjoubam, Pradip (2015), The Northeast Question: Conflicts and frontiers, Routledge, ISBN 978-1-317-34004-1
