= Khangkhui =

- Village
- Location in Manipur, India Khangkhui (India)
- Coordinates: 25°03′41″N 94°24′50″E
- Country: India
- State: Manipur
- District: Ukhrul

Population
  - Total: 1,483

Languages
  - Official: Tangkhul (Khangkhui tui)
- Time zone: UTC+5:30 (IST)
- PIN: 795142
- Vehicle registration: MN
- Nearest city: Ukhrul Kohima
- Literacy: 91.09%
- Lok Sabha constituency: Outer Manipur
- Vidhan Sabha constituency: Ukhrul
- Website: khangkhuiphungdhar.vercel.app

Khangkhui is a Tangkhul Naga village in the North-eastern part of Ukhrul district of Manipur, India. The village is about 16 kilometer from Ukhrul District headquarters. The village is flanked by Choithar in the west, Nungshong in the south, Pushing in the east and Langdang and Shirui in the north.

It is well known for its ancient limestone cave locally called Khangkhui Mangsor. This pre-historic cave is one of the tourist attractions of Ukhrul district. The excavation carried out by Shri O. Kumar Singh (Superintendent of the State Archaeology Department of Manipur) at the Khangkhui Cave yielded evidence of habitation of Stone Age communities

== People and Place ==
Khangkhui village has two settlements, Khangkhui Khullen (Old settlement) and Khangkhui Phungdhar (New settlement). According to 2011 census, the two settlements have together have 289 households with the total population of 1483 persons. Agriculture is the primary occupation of the populace. Literacy rate of the village is 91.09%.
