= Shingkap =

- Village
- Nickname: Shingkap
- Location in Manipur, India Shingkap (India)
- Coordinates: 24°51′49″N 94°14′51″E
- Country: India
- State: Manipur
- District: Ukhrul

Population
  - Total: 723

Languages
  - Official: Tangkhul (Shingkap tui)
- Time zone: UTC+5:30 (IST)
- PIN: 795142
- Vehicle registration: MN
- Nearest city: Ukhrul Imphal
- Literacy: 81.06%
- Lok Sabha constituency: Outer Manipur
- Vidhan Sabha constituency: Phungyar
- Website: manipur.gov.in

Shingkap is a village located south of Ukhrul in Ukhrul district, Manipur state, India. The village is about 35 kilometers from Ukhrul via National Highway 150 that connects Imphal and Kohima via Ukhrul and Jessami. Shingkap is flanked by Lungpha in the north, Riha in the west, Tangkhul Hundung in the south and Alang in the east. Locally, the inhabitants speak Shingkap tui which belongs to the Tibeto-Burman language family.

== Total population ==
According to 2011 census, Shingkap has 119 households with the total of 723 people of which 358 are male and 365 are female. Of the total population, 79 were in the age group of 0–6 years. The average sex ratio of the village is 1020 female to 1000 male which is higher than the state average of 985. The literacy rate of the village stands at 81.06% which is higher than the state average 76.94%. Male literacy rate stands at 84.95% while female literacy rate was 77.23%.

== People and occupation ==
The village is home to people of Tangkhul Naga tribe. All of the inhabitants are Christians. Agriculture is the primary occupation of the inhabitants. Shingkap is one of the 44 villages considered likely to be affected as a catchment area when the Mapithel multi purpose project is finally functional. Professor Yaruingam Awungshi, a sociologist specialized on African religion hails from this village. In 2013, Jonathan Kashung, a well known social worker among the Tangkhuls from Shingkap was kidnapped and murdered by the NSCN for some undisclosed reason. The same year, the village was in news for a devastating heavy rainfall that have a heavy impact on cultivation.
