= Thoyee =

Thoyee Thawai Tangkhul
- Village
- Location in India Thoyee (India)
- Coordinates: 24.929°N 94.162°E
- Country: India
- District: Ukhrul

Population (2014)
  - Total: 2,000
- Time zone: UTC+5:30 (IST)
- PIN: 795145
- Vehicle registration: MN and NL
- Website: thoyeevillage.com

Thoyee, also called the Thawai Thangkhul village, is a Tangkhul village in Ukhrul district, on the border with Kangpokpi district, in Manipur, India. The village is about 28 km from Imphal and about 54 km from Ukhrul town. It falls under Litan Police station of Phungyar-Sub division. As of 2014, the village had 335 households and a population of 2000 out of which 1050 are males and 950 were females. It is close to National Highway 202 which runs between Imphal and Ukhrul.

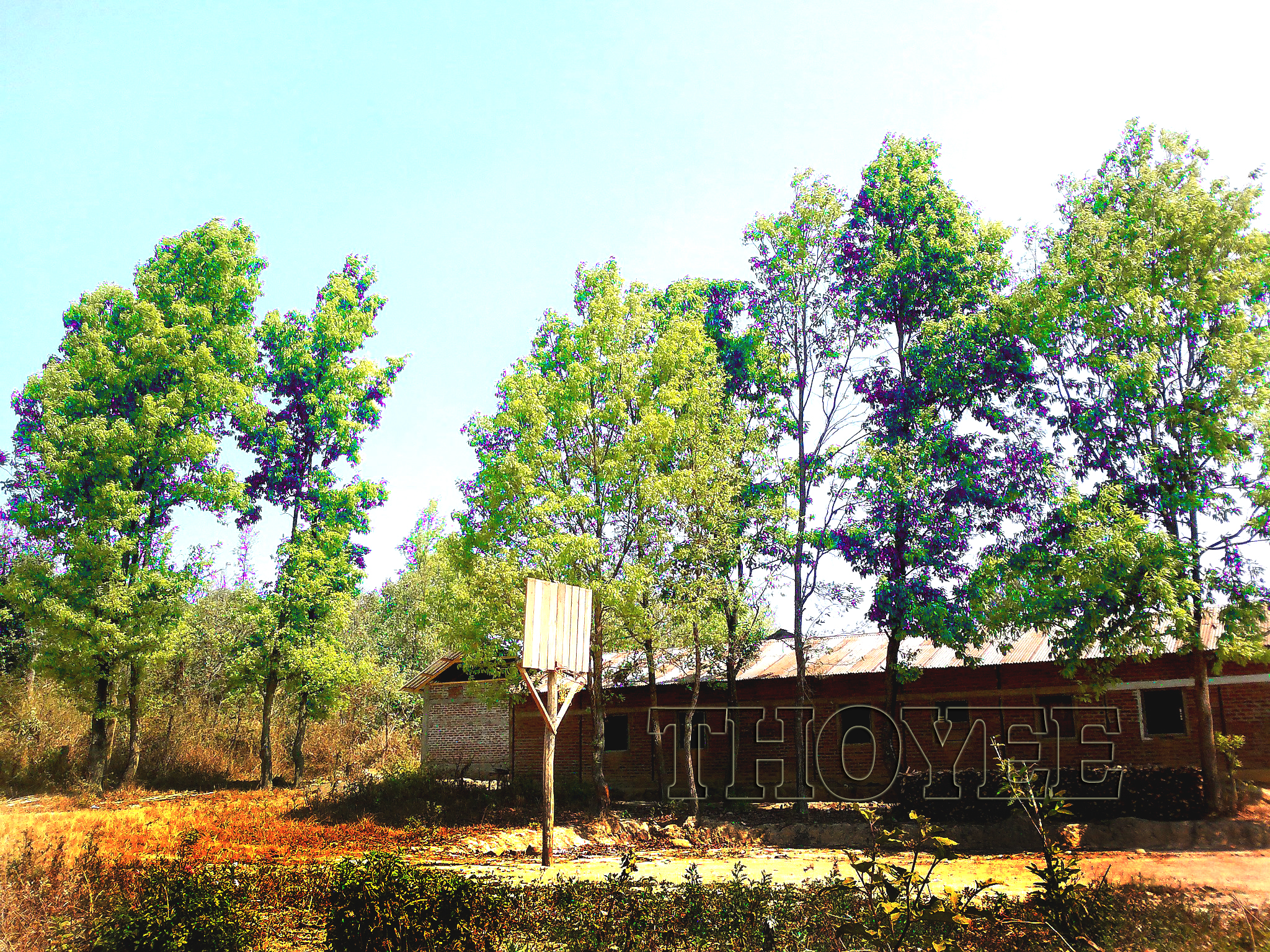
Thawai High School

== Village boundary ==
Thawai is flanked by the following neighboring villages demarcating the village boundary.

North: Sarkaphung Village

South: Riha Village

East: Marou Village

West: Hongmahn Village

== Mountains and rivers ==
Mountains:

1. Rammaying Kaphung (Mapithel)

2. Hongshungkat Kaphung (Mahadev/Valley View)

Rivers:

1. Yangwui Kong (River)

2. Marau Kong
