= Phungyar Assembly constituency =

Legislative Assembly constituency in Manipur State, India

Coordinates: 24.82°N 94.36°E

Phungyar
- Constituency for the Manipur Legislative Assembly

Constituency details
- Country: India
- Region: Northeast India
- State: Manipur
- District: Ukhrul
- Lok Sabha constituency: Outer Manipur
- Established: 1967
- Total electors: 34,789
- Reservation: ST

Member of Legislative Assembly
- 12th Manipur Legislative Assembly
- Incumbent Leishiyo Keishing
- Party: NPF
- Alliance: NDA
- Elected year: 2022

Phungyar is the 43rd assembly constituency of 60 ACs covering an area of 2,338 sq. Km. It is the biggest in area coverageLegislative Assembly constituencies of Manipur state in India.

It is part of Kamjong district and is reserved for candidates belonging to the Scheduled Tribes.

== Members of the Legislative Assembly ==
Year	Member	Party
2017	Leishiyo Keishing	Naga People's Front

== Election results ==
Vote share of winning candidates
2022	37.75%
2017	47.68%
2012	52.03%
2007	48.86%
2002	23.13%
2000	31.00%
1995	50.55%
1990	38.57%
1984	53.55%
1980	46.65%
1974	57.55%
1972	64.97%
1967	66.21%

=== 2027 Assembly election ===
2027 Manipur Legislative Assembly election: Phungyar
Party	Candidate	Votes	%	±%
INC				
NDA				
NOTA	None of the above			
Majority				
Turnout				
gain from		Swing		

=== Assembly Election 2022 ===
2022 Manipur Legislative Assembly election: Phungyar
Party	Candidate	Votes	%	±%
NPF	Leishiyo Keishing	11,642	37.75%	−9.93%
BJP	Awung Shimray Hopingson	10,863	35.23%	6.69%
INC	Victor Keishing	7,453	24.17%	2.88%
JD(U)	Wungnaoshang Kasar	693	2.25%	
SS	Ninghor Jajo	154	0.50%	
Margin of victory		779	2.53%	−16.62%
Turnout		30,838	88.64%	5.92%
Registered electors		34,789		15.32%
NPF hold		Swing	-9.93%	

=== Assembly Election 2017 ===
2017 Manipur Legislative Assembly election: Phungyar
Party	Candidate	Votes	%	±%
NPF	Leishiyo Keishing	11,900	47.68%	6.00%
BJP	Somi Awungshi	7,122	28.54%	
INC	Victor Keishing	5,313	21.29%	−30.74%
Independent	A. S. Hopingson	452	1.81%	
Margin of victory		4,778	19.15%	8.80%
Turnout		24,956	82.73%	21.58%
Registered electors		30,167		12.58%
NPF gain from INC		Swing	-4.35%	

=== Assembly Election 2012 ===
2012 Manipur Legislative Assembly election: Phungyar
Party	Candidate	Votes	%	±%
INC	Victor Keishing	8,525	52.03%	3.74%
NPF	Honreikhui Kashung	6,830	41.69%	
MSCP	Bountia Keishing	967	5.90%	
Margin of victory		1,695	10.35%	9.78%
Turnout		16,384	61.12%	−21.12%
Registered electors		26,797		0.65%
INC gain from Independent		Swing	3.17%	

=== Assembly Election 2007 ===
2007 Manipur Legislative Assembly election: Phungyar
Party	Candidate	Votes	%	±%
Independent	K. Wungnaoshang	10,700	48.86%	
INC	Victor Keishing	10,577	48.30%	30.46%
NNP	Valley Rose Hungyo	562	2.57%	
Margin of victory		123	0.56%	−4.73%
Turnout		21,900	82.26%	−5.39%
Registered electors		26,623		19.16%
Independent gain from MSCP		Swing	25.73%	

=== Assembly Election 2002 ===
2002 Manipur Legislative Assembly election: Phungyar
Party	Candidate	Votes	%	±%
MSCP	K. Wungnaoshang	4,412	23.13%	10.89%
INC	Rishang Keishing	3,403	17.84%	−13.16%
FPM	K. Somi	3,084	16.17%	
BJP	N. Solomon	2,583	13.54%	
NCP	Ramthing Hungyo	2,559	13.41%	3.79%
Manipur National Conference	Johnson Keishing	2,513	13.17%	
NNP	Ngaithingkhui Hungyo	467	2.45%	
Margin of victory		1,009	5.29%	−2.89%
Turnout		19,076	87.65%	7.14%
Registered electors		22,342		4.67%
MSCP gain from INC		Swing	-27.42%	

=== Assembly Election 2000 ===
2000 Manipur Legislative Assembly election: Phungyar
Party	Candidate	Votes	%	±%
INC	Rishang Keishing	4,539	31.00%	−19.55%
JD(U)	Wungnaoshang Keishing	3,342	22.82%	
SAP	Somi Keishing	2,665	18.20%	5.09%
MSCP	Mahongnao Ngaranmi	1,792	12.24%	
NCP	Ramthing Hungyo	1,409	9.62%	
Independent	K. Paul	846	5.78%	
Margin of victory		1,197	8.17%	−19.84%
Turnout		14,643	69.37%	−11.13%
Registered electors		21,345		15.04%
INC hold		Swing	-19.55%	

=== Assembly Election 1995 ===
1995 Manipur Legislative Assembly election: Phungyar
Party	Candidate	Votes	%	±%
INC	Rishang Keishing	7,467	50.55%	11.98%
MPP	Solomon	3,328	22.53%	11.87%
JD	Paul	2,023	13.69%	
SAP	Ngaithingkhui Hungyo	1,937	13.11%	
Margin of victory		4,139	28.02%	14.77%
Turnout		14,772	80.51%	−2.57%
Registered electors		18,555		−13.08%
INC hold		Swing	11.98%	

=== Assembly Election 1990 ===
1990 Manipur Legislative Assembly election: Phungyar
Party	Candidate	Votes	%	±%
INC	Rishang Keishing	6,798	38.57%	−14.98%
INS(SCS)	N. Solomon	4,462	25.31%	
JD	Ngaithingkhui Hungyo	4,107	23.30%	
MPP	A. S. Stephen	1,879	10.66%	
Manipur Hill People'S Council	M. C. Ngathingkhui	381	2.16%	
Margin of victory		2,336	13.25%	1.64%
Turnout		17,627	83.07%	8.25%
Registered electors		21,346		21.61%
INC hold		Swing	-14.98%	

=== Assembly Election 1984 ===
1984 Manipur Legislative Assembly election: Phungyar
Party	Candidate	Votes	%	±%
INC	Rishang Keishing	6,881	53.55%	
IC(S)	A. Stephen	5,389	41.94%	
Independent	Ngaithingkhui Hungyo	580	4.51%	
Margin of victory		1,492	11.61%	−8.93%
Turnout		12,850	74.82%	−1.77%
Registered electors		17,553		13.09%
INC gain from INC(I)		Swing	6.90%	

=== Assembly Election 1980 ===
1980 Manipur Legislative Assembly election: Phungyar
Party	Candidate	Votes	%	±%
INC(I)	Rishang Keishing	5,440	46.65%	
JP	M. C. Ngathingkhui	3,045	26.11%	
Independent	K. Prongo	2,281	19.56%	
Independent	Ngaithingkhui Hungyo	724	6.21%	
INC(U)	Yamkhothang	171	1.47%	
Margin of victory		2,395	20.54%	5.43%
Turnout		11,661	76.60%	2.42%
Registered electors		15,521		34.75%
INC(I) gain from INC		Swing	-10.90%	

=== Assembly Election 1974 ===
1974 Manipur Legislative Assembly election: Phungyar
Party	Candidate	Votes	%	±%
INC	Rishang Keishing	4,861	57.55%	35.32%
Manipur Hills Union	Stephen Angkang	3,585	42.45%	
Margin of victory		1,276	15.11%	−27.63%
Turnout		8,446	74.18%	7.90%
Registered electors		11,518		71.63%
INC gain from Independent		Swing	-7.42%	

=== Assembly Election 1972 ===
1972 Manipur Legislative Assembly election: Phungyar
Party	Candidate	Votes	%	±%
Independent	Rishang Keishing	2,849	64.97%	
INC	Stephen Angkang	975	22.23%	−43.98%
Independent	K. Wungnaoshang	415	9.46%	
Independent	Engy Makan	146	3.33%	
Margin of victory		1,874	42.74%	−6.14%
Turnout		4,385	66.28%	18.13%
Registered electors		6,711		−36.78%
Independent gain from INC		Swing	-1.24%	

=== Assembly Election 1967 ===
1967 Manipur Legislative Assembly election: Phungyar
Party	Candidate	Votes	%	±%
INC	K. Envey	3,247	66.21%	
Independent	H. L. Kim	850	17.33%	
SSP	B. S. James	807	16.46%	
Margin of victory		2,397	48.88%	
Turnout		4,904	48.15%	
Registered electors		10,615		
INC win (new seat)				

== See also ==
- List of constituencies of the Manipur Legislative Assembly
- Ukhrul district
