= Khamlang =

- Village
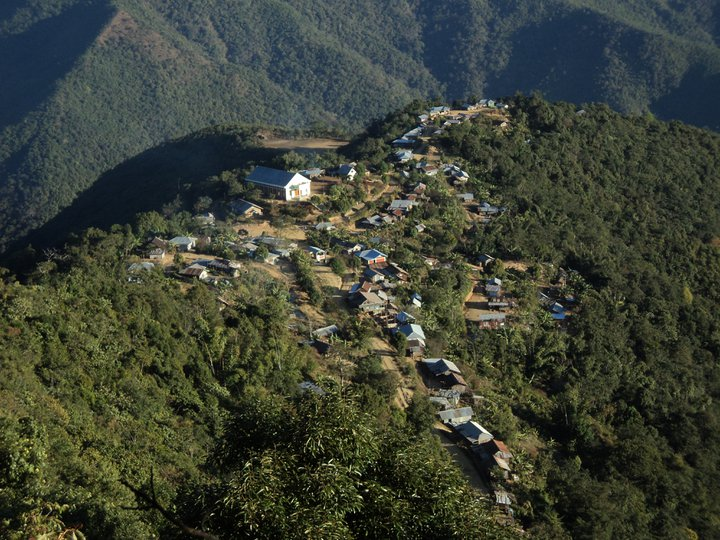
- Interactive map of Khamlang
- Coordinates: 24°41′45″N 94°15′40″E
- Headquarters: Kamjong

Area
  - Total: 29.8 km^{2} (11.5 sq mi)

Population (2011)
  - Total: 485
- Time zone: UTC+5:30 (IST)
- Postal code: 795149
- Awunga: Mahaiwung Shanglai
- Assembly Constituency: Phungyar

Khamlang village is situated on the southern part of Ukhrul District, Manipur, India. It is inhabited by Khameon (People of Khamlang) a Tangkhul Naga tribe. It is situated 2 km away from headquarter of Sub-Division, Kasom Khullen, 137 km away from district headquarter Ukhrul and 59 km from state capital Imphal, Manipur.

Khamlang is govern by Awunga as the chief of the village and Hangva as his ministers

Khamlang village is a medium size village with a total number of 99 families. It has a population of 485 of which 232 are males while 253 are females as per Population Census 2011. It has lower literacy rate compared to Manipur. In 2011, the literacy rate was 64.96% compared to 76.94% of Manipur, Male literacy stands at 69.04% while female literacy rate was 61.21%. The population of children with age 0-6 is 74 person which makes up 15.26% of total population of village. Average Sex Ratio is 1091 which is higher than Manipur state average of 985. Child Sex Ratio for the Khamlang as per census is 1114, higher than Manipur average of 930.

== Rivers ==
The famous Tuyungbi River runs through this village which is originated from Shanshak, shokvao, Ramva and Leishi. This river divides Khamlang with Sorde in the West. There are two streams Chekong and untungkong. There are many rivulets like unjuikong, samasikong. Fuhringkong etc. flows in this village.

== Academy/School ==
Hills Academy is a residential Academy which is located in this village. Neighboring villages of Southern villages, Ukhrul received education from this Academy.
Khamlang Primary School is the only government school in this village.

== Organization ==
Leadership Training Project(LDP) is Non-profit organization under the sponsorship of Worldwide Christian Churches Ministry. This organization has profited a lot to the people and societies of Southern Ukhrul District.

== Religion ==
This village practice 100% Christianity as their religion, it's believed that they practice animism before the advent of Christianity. They called the Church as Khamlang Baptist Church which is affiliated to Southern Tangkhul Naga Baptist Association(STNBA).

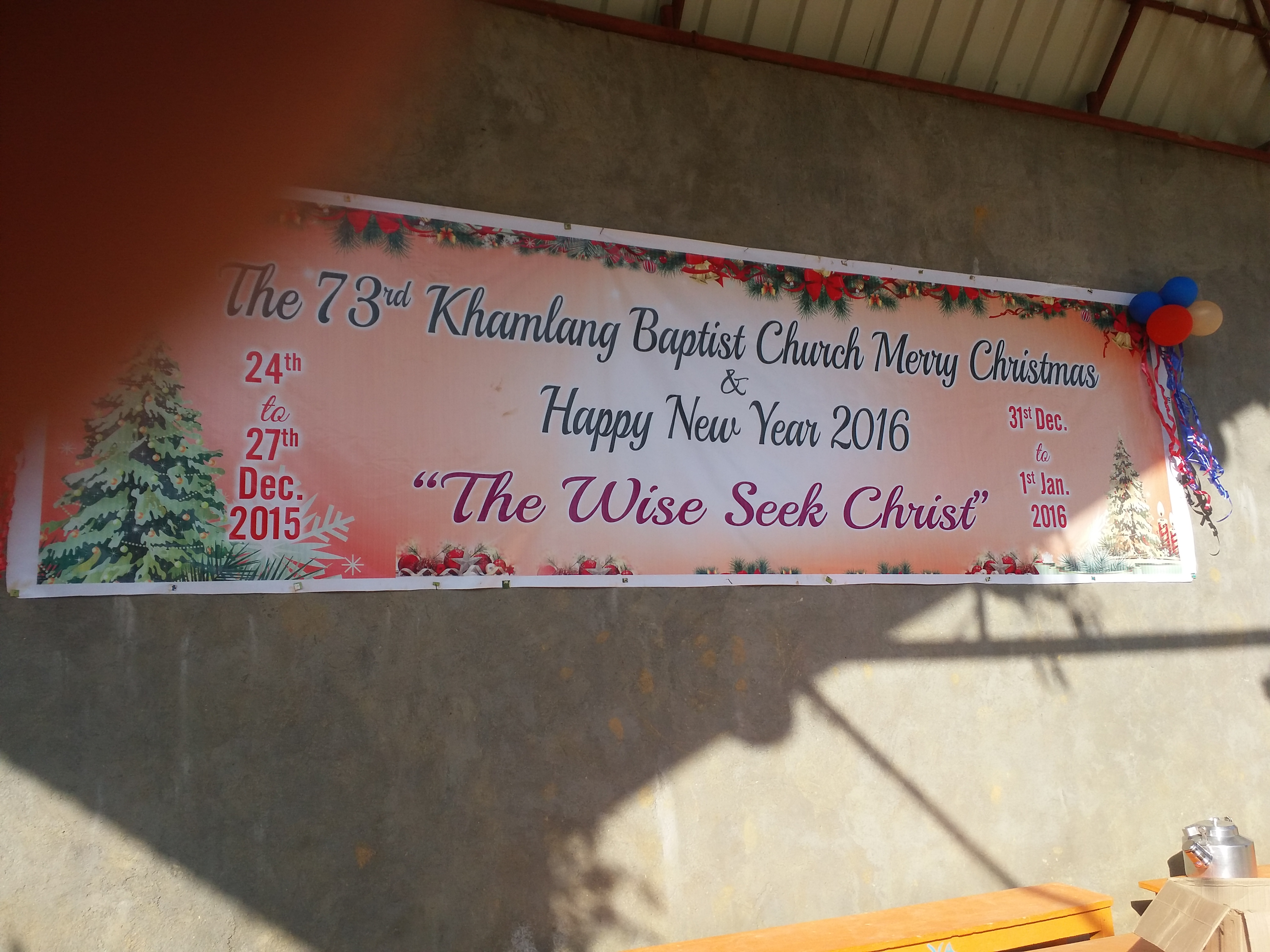

== Livelihood ==
Khamlang villages practice mostly Jhuming/slash and burn cultivation. which is very much associated with their culture and custom. Some villagers are a government employees.

== Festival ==
In olden days Khamlang villages celebrated many festivals, but with the coming of Christianity, most festivals were not celebrated. However, some festivals are still practiced in Christian ways such as Ramtho phanit, the harvest festival, etc.

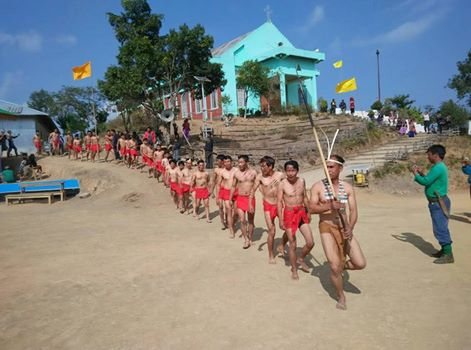
Ramtho Phanit(festival)
