= Kasom Khullen =

Coordinates: 24.680°N 94.271°E

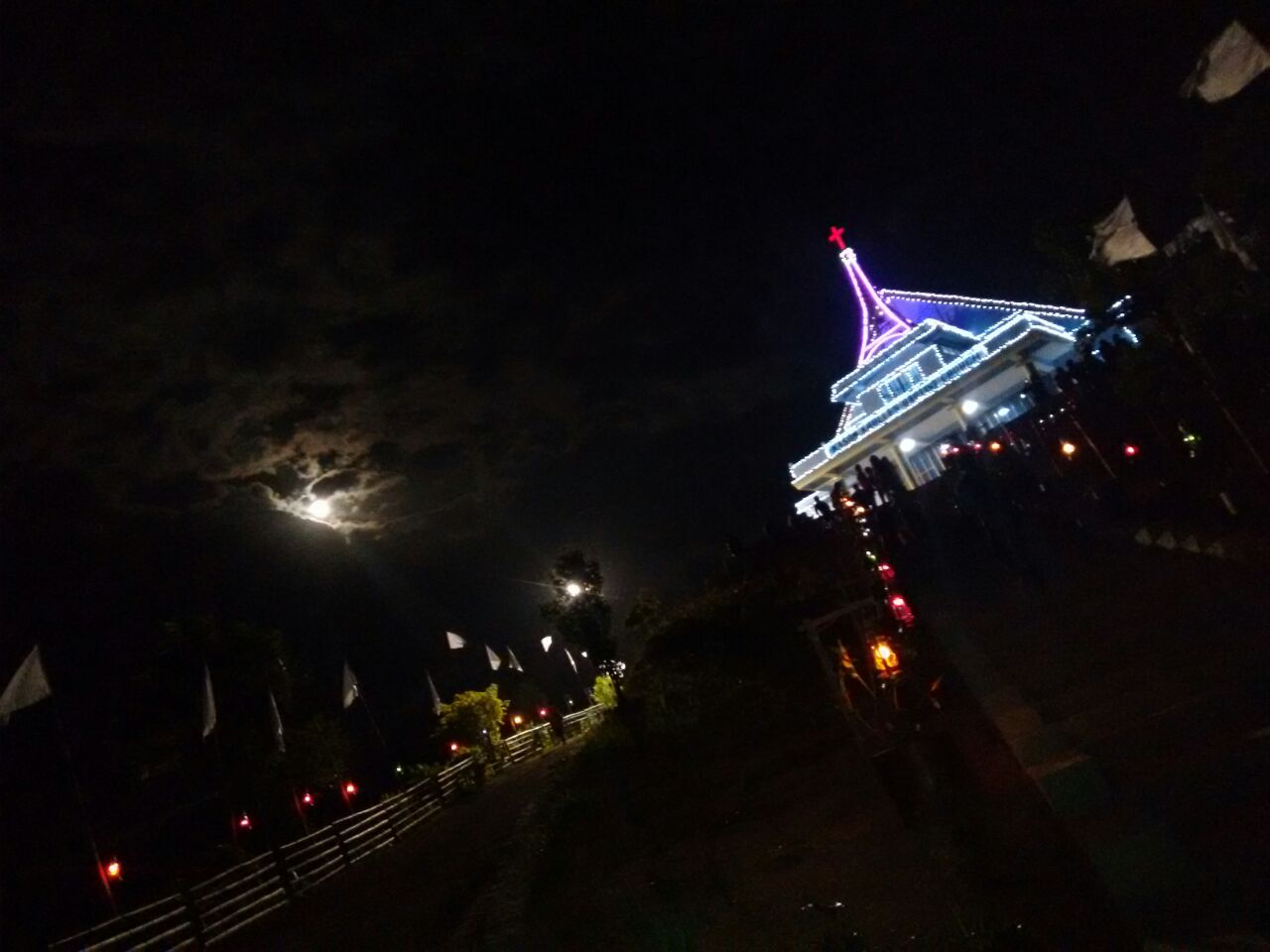
Kasom Khullen

Kasom Khullen village is located in the northeastern state of India. The village is 64 km drive from the heart of Imphal, Manipur. It is an administrative headquarter of the Kasom Sub Division (consisting of 80 villages) in the southern region of Kamjong district.

Kasom Khullen is inhabited by the Tangkhul Naga tribe. Although the village has distinct dialect of its own, the village folks are also fluent in tangkhul dialect, Meitei lon (Manipuri) and Hindi. The younger generations are multilingual I.e Hindi, English, Manipuri, Tangkhul, Kabui etc due to exposure to other culture.

Kasom Khullen has unique history of culture and tradition, widely known for its folk dances among the tangkhul Naga tribes as shown in the table below.

The Kasom khullen village is believed to be 525 years old village. The inhabitants have been living there since 1497 AD. But the current household is 250 due to migration of the villagers and establishment of new villages such as kasom somrei village, kasom risophung village, lungtoram village, kasom khunuo village and Yeasom village. The families are joint family and patrilocal. During the pre-Christian era, the people worshipped “Arih Lungzing” or “Bukati Bukatangpe”; they were believed to be the creators of heaven and earth. However, with the advent of Christianity, the people started converting to Christianity in 1940. The village officially adopted Christianity in the year 1947, but the cultural traditions of the village are still preserved through its folk music, dances, and festivals.

The main religion is Christianity. The Roman Catholic Church and the Baptist church coexist peacefully. The Roman Catholic Church is located in the southern part of the village. Their missionary includes education, leadership training to youth, spirituality etc. The RC church runs Good shepherd high school(estd 2001), boarding for both boys and girls, Sisters convent, Fathers convent as part of their missionary. The serenity and tranquility provides a good environment for education which caters the need of students from both the local and the neighbouring villages.

On the other hand, majority of the population are Baptist. The Baptist church stands tall in the mid of the village which provides a Panoramic view of the village.

The kasom khullen has Government higher secondary school. It has teachers’ quarters, separate Boys and girls hostel. The school has good performance in both HSLC (class X) and HSSLC (class XII) with over 90 percent pass percentage. However the infrastructure is in sorry state due to poor maintenance by the concerned authority.

STATISTICS

*Literacy rate : 88.53% (Male literacy rate : 95.16%, Female literacy rate : 81.57%)

*Schools : 4 no’s. ( Govt higher sec.school, Leimaroi Christian English high school, Good shepherd high school, SSA primary school)

*Church : 2 no’s. ( Roman Catholic Church, Baptist Church)

== Occupation ==
The main occupation of the village is agriculture, practicing Jhum cultivation. The people are simple and have a great work ethic, even though the majority of the population is literate. Fishing and hunting also play an important role in the daily livelihood of the village. Almost every household in the village is equipped with the necessary tools and weapons for it. However the occupation is evolving from Jhum to agripreneur, horticulture, food processing and apiary. The young graduates have taken up new occupation such as bureaucrats, bankers, counsellors, accountants, teachers, military, theologian etc.

== Festivals ==
Throughout the ages, the village has been taking an active part in preserving the unique culture of the Tangkhul Naga tribe. Apart from the various festivals of the Tangkhul Naga tribe, the village also has its own, notably the Ramtho Phanit and Reiko festivals. Ramtho Phanit is the festival which marks the beginning of the agricultural year. Reiko is the festival that is observed whenever the village leads a successful expedition against the enemies in the past. It is observed till this day whenever the village brings laurels and is victorious in Sporting events.

(REIKO FESTIVAL)

The word ‘Reiko’ is a colossal wooden drum carved out of ‘the biggest of the biggest tree’ with chisel and axe in the forest. Reiko festival is a celebration of bringing the finished wooden drum from the thick forest to the village. It is believed that cutting down a big tree which is an abode of a deity (pre Christian era) brings bad luck to the villagers. So to appease the deity of the chosen tree, the village shaman( local priest)made a sacrifice of meat and local wine. After the ritual and sacrifice, the male members of the village chopped down the tree and carved artistically into a traditional drum. It takes a month or two to complete the whole process. On completion the village chief (king aka headman) ordered the village folks, young to old, male to female, to participate and bring it to the village. The Reiko is strapped with lots of bamboo and ropes. The Bamboos are used to lift up and carry the Reiko on shoulder ( men ) and the ropes to pull or drag (for women and children) into the village. The celebration begins with the village chief(headman) and his assistant(khupou) seated on top of the reiko. With the command of the khupou everyone lifted up the Reiko and moved in unison. The villagers carry on till the destination is reached. The Reiko is placed near the community ground or hall where everyone could see and rejoice it. This colossal drum has multipurpose in ancient time. It is used for celebration, sounding alarm during enemies attacks, emergency, sending messages to neighbouring villages etc.

During the Reiko festival, the villagers celebrate, perform various folk dances, and dine together as an insignia of ancestral cultural heritage.

The cultural heritage of kasom khullen is still celebrated but on rare occasion.

== Folk dances ==
Kasom Khullen is famous for its unique folk dances. The following is the list of events in which the village participated in folk dances:

Dates and events	Venue
15 June- 8 Sept, 1973. International Folkloric Festival.(Participated as India's representative - 3rd Position)	Tunisia, Romania, Malta, Spain, Bulgaria
26 January 1960. Republic Day Celebration, India	Delhi
1976. All India Congress Committee Seminar	Guwahati
26 Jan 1977. Republic Day Celebration, India	Delhi
1990. Naga's Convention	Kohima
1994. State level Youth Festival, Manipur (3rd Position)	Khuman Lampak, Imphal
Oct. 1998. Gen Conference, All Naga Students' Association Manipur	Chandel District Headquarters
Nov.1999 National Games of India	Khuman Lampak Main Stadium Imphal
Oct. 2003. 20th Gen Conf. Of Naga Students' Federation	Ngalang, Dimapur
26 Jan.2010. Republic Day Celebration, India	Ukhrul
