= Pradhan Mantri Gram Sadak Yojana =

Highway initiative in India

Pradhan Mantri Gram Sadak Yojana (PMGSY)
- Prime Minister's Village Road Scheme
- Launched: 25 December 2000; 24 years ago
- Status: Active
- Website: pmgsy.nic.in

The Pradhan Mantri Gram Sadak Yojana (PMGSY) (transl. Prime Minister's Village Road Scheme) is a nationwide plan in India to provide good all-weather road connectivity to unconnected villages. Of 178,000 (1.7 lakh) habitations with a population of above 500 in the plains and above 250 in the hilly areas planned to be connected by all-weather roads, 82% were already connected by December 2017 and work was on track for completion by March 2019 (c. December 2017) on the remaining 47,000 habitations .

This Centrally Sponsored Scheme was introduced in 2000 by the then-prime minister of India Atal Bihari Vajpayee. The Assam Tribune has reported that the scheme has started to change the lifestyle of many villagers as it has resulted in new roads and upgrade of certain inter-village routes in Manipur.

== History ==
The PMGSY is under the authority of the Ministry of Rural Development and was begun on 25 December 2000. It is fully funded by the central government. During November 2015, following the recommendations of the 14th Finance Commission, the Sub-Group of Chief Ministers on Rationalization of Centrally Sponsored Schemes, it was announced that the project will be funded by both the central government (60%) and states (40%).

== Aim ==
The aim was to provide roads to all villages:

1. with a population of 1000 persons and above by 2003
2. with a population of 500 persons and above by 2007
3. in hill states, tribal and desert area villages with a population of 500 persons and above by 2003
4. in hill states, tribal and desert area villages with a population of 250 persons and above by 2007.

== OMMAS ==
In order to implement this, an Online Management, Monitoring and Accounting System or OMMAS GIS system was developed to identify targets and monitor progress It is developed by e-governance department of C-DAC pune and is one of the biggest databases in India. The system manages and monitors all the phases of road development right from its proposal mode to road completion. The OMMAS also has separate module to track the expenses made on each road. Based on the data entered by state and district officers, OMMS generates detailed reports which are viewable in citizens section (http://omms.nic.in). OMMAS incorporates advanced features like E-payment, Password protected PDF files, Interactive Reports etc.

== Progress ==
Of 178,000 (1.7 lakh) habitations with a population of above 500 in the plains and above 250 in the hilly areas planned to be connected by all-weather roads, 55% (97,838) were connected by March 2014, 82% (80% or 131,000 or 1.3 lakh under the PMGSY and 2% or 14,620 under state govt schemes) were connected by December 2017. Of the remaining 47,000, work on all is in progress except for 1700 which will be approved by the end of December 2017 and 100% connectivity will be achieved by March 2019 (16 December 2017 update). Pending work included harsh terrain states of Assam, Jammu and Kashmir and Uttarakhand as well as left-wing Naxalite–Maoist extremism affected state of Chhattisgarh, some districts of Jharkhand and Malkangiri district of Odisha.

The average speed of road construction under the PMGSY was 98.5 kilometres per day from 2004 to 2014, it rose to 130 km per day in by 2014–17.

Cabinet Committee on Economic Affairs has given its approval for continuation of PM Gram Sadak Yojana (PMGSY) – I and PMGSY –II up to September 2022.

Road Connectivity Project for Left Wing Extremism Affected Areas has also been extended up to March 2023.

== Impact ==
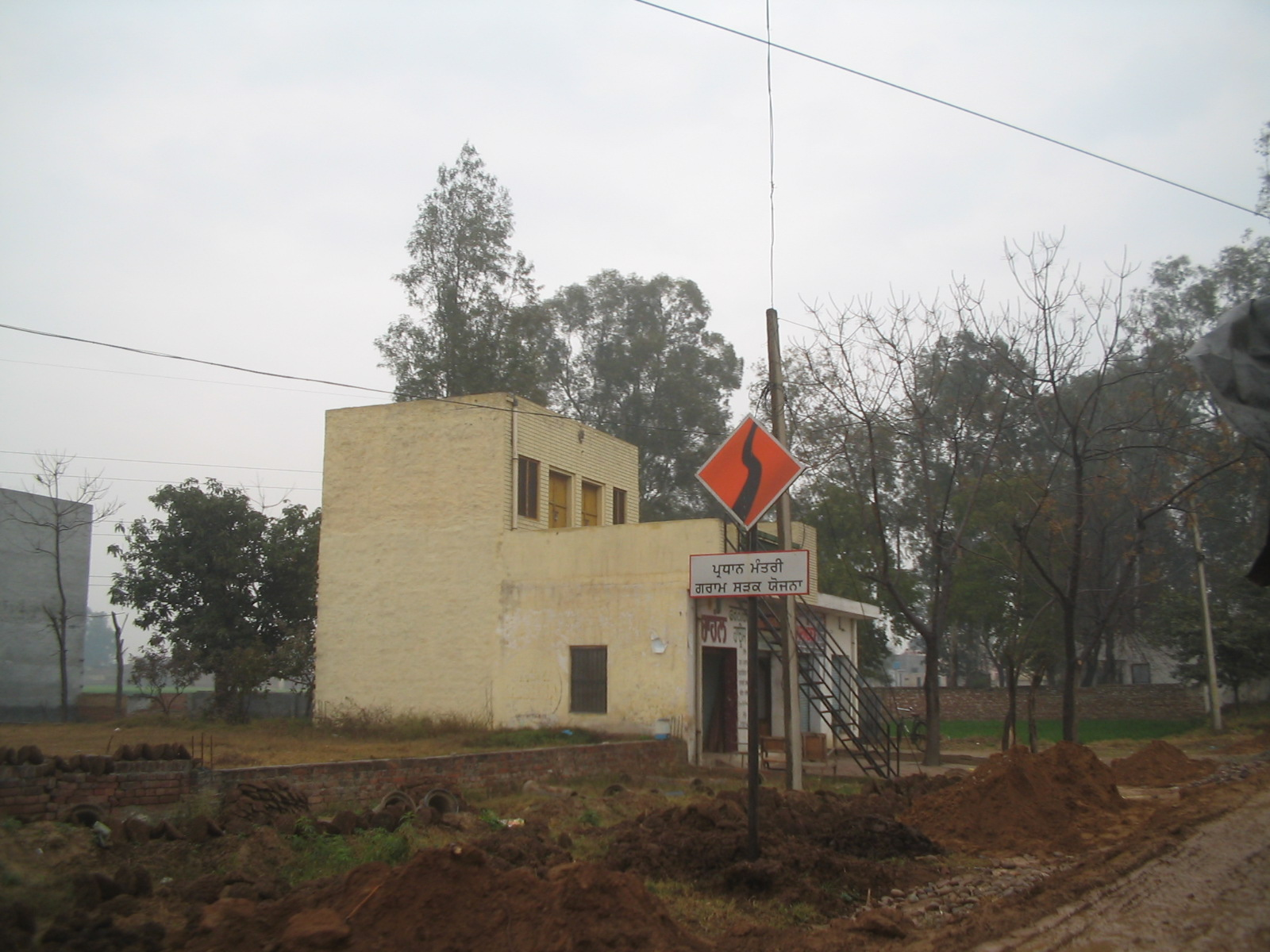
Pradhan Mantri Gram Sadak Yojana marker in a village in Punjab

Scheme has started to change the lifestyle of many villagers with new roads and upgrades, such as in Manipur. In a research paper, by Asher and Novosad (2020) the effects of the road construction program are described as follows: "Four years after road construction, the main effect of new feeder roads is to facilitate the movement of workers out of agriculture. However, there are no major changes in agricultural outcomes, income, or assets. Employment in village firms expands only slightly. Even with better market connections, remote areas may continue to lack economic opportunities."

== Complementary state schemes ==
Mukhya Mantri Gram Sadak Yojana run by various state governments are the schemes that complement PMGSY, including in Bihar, Chhattisgarh, Gujarat, Haryana, Madhya Pradesh, Maharashtra.

== Green cover ==
The program has been attempting to increase the green cover near the roads. This is through the planting of trees saplings, including the planting of fruit bearing tree saplings. Varied levels of success has emerged from these attempts.

== See also ==
- Pradhan Mantri Ujjwala Yojana
- Atal Pension Yojana
- Pradhan Mantri Jan Dhan Yojana
- Pradhan Mantri Matri Vandana Yojana
