= Kamjong district =

- District of Manipur
- Location in Manipur
- Coordinates (Kamjong): 24.86°N 94.50°E
- Country: India
- State: Manipur
- Established: 2016
- Headquarters: Kamjong

Area
  - Total: 2,338 km^{2} (903 sq mi)
  - Rank: 3

Population (2011)
  - Total: 45,616
  - Density: 19.51/km^{2} (50.53/sq mi)

Language(s)
  - Official: Meitei (officially called Manipuri) (Note: Meitei language (officially known as Manipuri language) is the official language of Manipur. Other regional languages of different places in Manipur may either be predominantly spoken or not in their respective places but "Meitei" is always officially used.)
- Time zone: UTC+05:30 (IST)
- Website: kamjong.nic.in

Kamjong district (Meitei pronunciation: /kām-jōng/) is one of the 16 districts of Manipur, India. It was created in 2016 from the Ukhrul district, from the former subdivisions Kamjong-Chassad, Phungyar-Phaisat and Kasom Khullen.

The district headquarters is located at Kamjong. It shares a long international border with Myanmar. The district is bounded by Myanmar in the east, Kangpokpi district in the West, Ukhrul district in the north and Tengnoupal district in the south. The terrain of the district is hilly with varying heights of 913 m to 3114 m (MSL). The district headquarter is linked with state highway of 120 Km from Imphal.

== Demographics ==
Religions in Kamjong district (2011)
Religion	Percent
Christianity	96.25%
Hinduism	2.73%
Islam	0.43%
Other or not stated	0.59%

Kamjong district has a population of 45,616, entirely rural. Kamjong had a sex ratio of 943 females per 1000 males. Scheduled Castes and Scheduled Tribes made up 0.05% and 96.56% of the population respectively.

Languages of Kamjong district (2011)
1. Tangkhul (89.1%)
2. Thadou (6.61%)
3. Kuki (1.63%)
4. Others (2.64%)

At the time of the 2011 census, 89.12% of the population spoke Tangkhul, 6.61% Thadou and 1.63% Kuki as their first language.

== Administration ==
The following are the sub-divisions in Kamjong district:

- Kamjong
- Sahamphung
- Kasom Khullen
- Phungyar

== See also ==
- List of populated places in Kamjong district
