= Kamjong =

- Village
- Interactive map of Kamjong
- Location in Manipur, India Kamjong (India)
- Coordinates: 24°51′29.998″N 94°30′35.219″E
- Country: India
- State: Manipur
- District: Kamjong district

Population
  - Total: 729

Language(s)
  - Official: Meitei (Manipuri)
  - Regional: Tangkhul and Thadou
- Time zone: UTC+5:30 (IST)
- PIN: 795145
- Vehicle registration: MN
- Nearest city: Ukhrul; Imphal
- Literacy: 71.96%
- Lok Sabha constituency: Outer Manipur
- Vidhan Sabha constituency: Phungyar
- Website: manipur.gov.in

Kamjong (Meitei pronunciation: /kām-jōng/), is the headquarters of Kamjong district, Manipur state, India. The village is about 120 kilometers from Imphal and is connected by Ukhrul-Kamjong State highway. This District headquarter is flanked by Langli in the north, Bungpa in the south, the Phange in the east and Dangthi in the west.

== People and occupation ==
According to 2011 census, Kamjong has 121 households with the total of 729 people. The population consists of Tangkhul Naga tribe and Thadou people. Majority of the inhabitants are Christians. Agriculture is the primary occupation of the inhabitants. Due to the porous international border with Myanmar Kamjong area most often is in the news for militancy activities. Kamjong area is also well known in the district for the poor transport system due to bad road condition and the inhabitants suffer most during the rainy season because of frequent landslides.

== See also ==
- Sorde village
