= Phungyar =

- Village
- Location in Manipur, India Phungyar (India)
- Coordinates: 24°48′59″N 94°21′32″E
- Country: India
- State: Manipur
- District: Ukhrul district

Population
  - Total: 953

Language(s)
  - Official: Meitei (officially called Manipuri) (Note: Meitei language (officially known as Manipuri language) is the official language of Manipur. Other regional languages of different places in Manipur may either be predominantly spoken or not in their respective places but "Meitei" is always officially used.)
  - Regional: Tangkhul
- Time zone: UTC+5:30 (IST)
- PIN: 795145
- Vehicle registration: MN
- Nearest city: Ukhrul; Imphal
- Literacy: 88.35%
- Lok Sabha constituency: Outer Manipur
- Vidhan Sabha constituency: Phungyar
- Website: manipur.gov.in

Phungyar (Meitei pronunciation: /phūng-yār/ (Note: Meitei language (officially known as Manipuri language) is the official language of Manipur. Other regional languages of different places in Manipur may either be predominantly spoken or not in their respective places but "Meitei" is always officially used.)) is a small town located south of Kamjong in Kamjong district, Manipur state, India. It is also the name of a sub division of the district. The town is about 50 kilometers from Ukhrul and is partially connected by National Highway 150 that connects Imphal and Kohima via Ukhrul and Jessami. The town is flanked by Khambi in the south, Loushing in the north, in the east Chungka and alang in the west. Locally, the inhabitants speak common tangkhul language and native village dialect which belongs to the Tibeto-Burman language family.

== Phungyar constituency ==
The Block is also a sub-divisional headquarters in Kamjong District previously (Ukhrul district) and is only one Vidhan Sabha constituency in Kamjong District. Leishiyo Keishing is the sitting MLA elected from Phungyar constituency under Naga People Front (NPF). He succeeded Victor Keishing under Indian National Congress in 2017 Manipur state election. Rishang Keishing was the first elected MLA from the Constituency who was elected seven times and represent Indian National Congress.

== Total population ==
According to 2011 census, Phungyar has 204 households with the total of 953 people of which 476 are male and 477 are female. Of the total population, 146 were in the age group of 0–6 years. The average sex ratio of the village is 1002 female to 1000 male which is higher than the state average of 985. The literacy rate of the village stands at 85.35% which is higher than the state average 76.94%. Male literacy rate stands at 90.43% while female literacy rate was 86.34%.

== People and occupation ==
The Block has gradually evolved into a township and is home to people of Tangkhul Naga tribe known as Kamo Tangkhul. Phungyar is a full fledged tribal revenue village .The village governance is headed by Headman / Village chief and assisted by elected village authority (VA). Minor crime such as theft, divorce and other disputes are settled by the VA. The VA in the hill areas is recognized by the State Government under the Manipur (Village Authority) Act, 1958. The inhabitants are Christians. Agriculture is the primary occupation of the inhabitants. The inhabitants practice Jhum cultivation. Carpentry, poultry, gardening and farming are largely practice at Phungyar HQ. There are also deposits of chromite and other natural resources nearby. The village is the centre for commercial and other related activities in the area. People from the area come to the village to sell vegetables, local bread (khamui), and other produces in Phungyar market. It also serves as educational hub in the area with Phungyar Hr. Sec. School, Adventist School and Rising Model English School in the town. There is various denomination of Christian faith. It also the centre of transportation. There are daily bus and taxis services from Phungyar to Ukhrul and Imphal. Transportation had been properly functional since 1970s. It is the second oldest block established in 1959 next to Ukhrul. The village was in the news when many villages in the sub-division were cut off from the rest of the district because of unmaintained road, incessant rain and landslides.
