= Ukhrul =

- Town
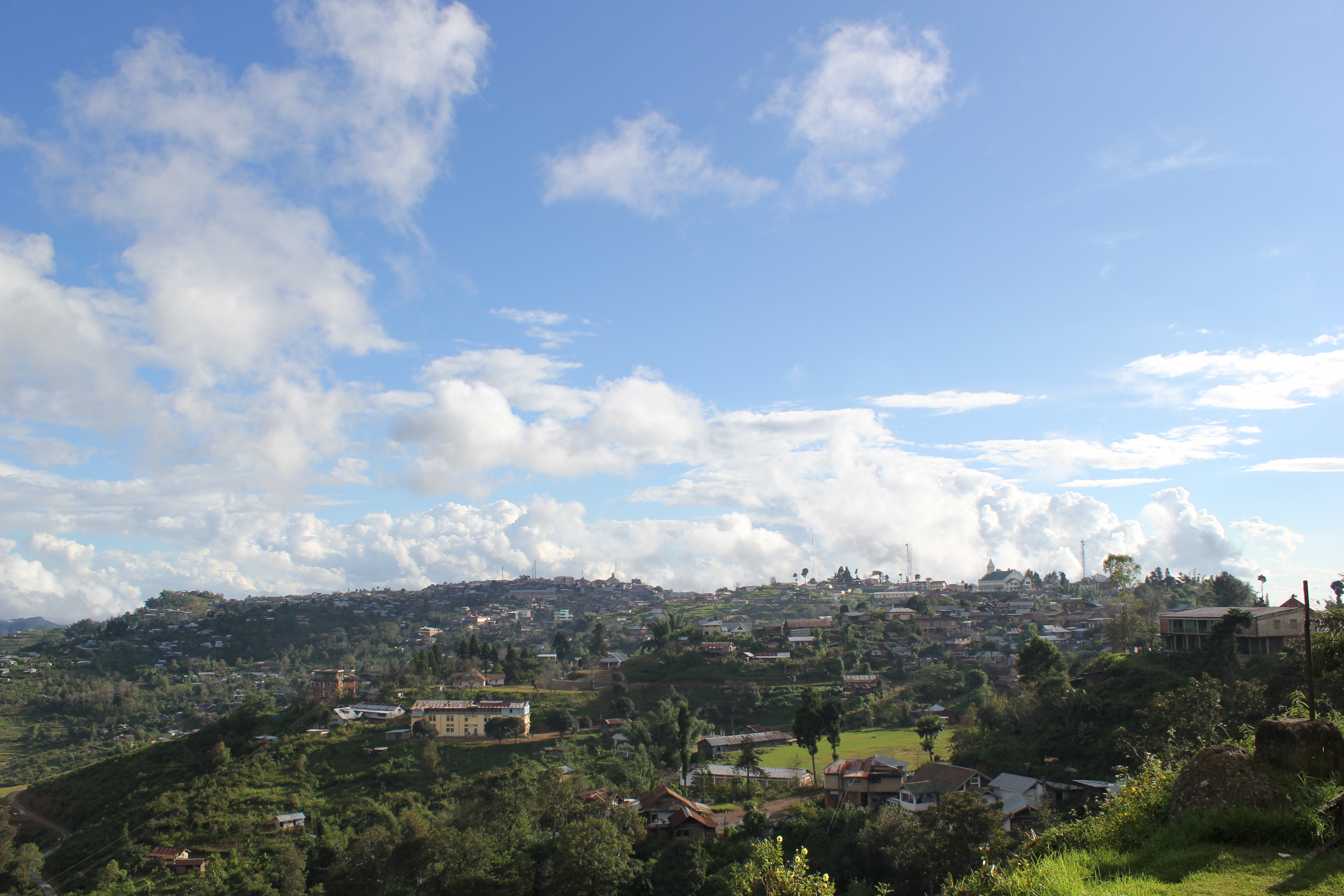
- Partial view of north-eastern Ukhrul

- Location in Manipur, India Ukhrul (India)
- Coordinates: 25.1°N 94.3616°E
- Country: India
- State: Manipur
- District: Ukhrul district
- Elevation: 1,800 m (5,900 ft)

Population (2011)
  - Total: 27,187

Language(s)
  - Official: English
  - Regional: Tangkhul
- Time zone: UTC+5:30 (IST)
- PIN: 795142
- Vehicle registration: MN 07
- Sex ratio: 1002 ♂/♀
- Website: www.ukhrul.nic.in

Ukhrul (Tangkhul pronunciation:/ˈuːkˌɹəl or ˈuːkˌɹʊl/ (Note: Meitei language (officially known as Manipuri language) is the official language of Manipur. Other regional languages of different places in Manipur may either be predominantly spoken or not in their respective places but "Meitei" is always officially used.) is the headquarters of Ukhrul district, one of the hilly district in the state of Manipur, India. Ukhrul is the home of the Tangkhul Nagas. It is the administrative headquarter of the Ukhrul district. There are also four sub-divisions in the district for administering the villages in and around it. The villages, however, are governed by the 'village heads'. It is also famous for the Shirui Lily.

== Geography ==
Ukhrul is located at 25.12°N 94.37°E. It is at an elevation of 1,800 m (5,900 ft) above sea level. The district experiences its rainy season from May to early October, while winters are generally cold and dry.

== Politics ==
There have been two chief ministers of Manipur from Ukhrul district Yangmaso Shaiza and Rishang Keishing), as well as other leaders such as Rungsung Suisa and Thuingaleng Muivah. Ukhrul is part of Outer Manipur.
