= Sharkaphung =

Sharkaphung Sikibung
- Village
- Interactive map of Sharkaphung
- Location in Manipur, India Sharkaphung (India)
- Coordinates: 24.9454°N 94.1832°E
- Country: India
- State: Manipur
- District: Kamjong
- Elevation: 945 m (3,100 ft)

Population (2011)
  - Total: 1,084

Languages
  - Spoken: Tangkhul (Sarkaphung tui)
- Time zone: UTC+5:30 (IST)
- PIN: 795142
- Vehicle registration: MN
- Nearest city: Ukhrul Imphal
- Literacy: 74.03%
- Lok Sabha constituency: Outer Manipur
- Vidhan Sabha constituency: Phungyar

Sharkaphung, also known as Sikibung, (Note: Alternative spellings: Sarkaphung, Sagabung, Sekibung, Shikibung, Shikiphung and Sikiphung.) and Sikibung Tangkhul, is a village in Kamjong district, Manipur, India. It is on the left bank of the Thoubal River, close to the Imphal–Ukhrul Road (NH-202). There used to be a Sikibung Kuki village as well in close vicinity, but it has disappeared after the Kuki–Naga clashes of the 1990s. At present Sharkaphung is flanked by the Thawai Kuki village on the west and Litan in the east (the latter in Ukhrul district). The village has frequently asserted its "jurisdiction" over Litan Sareikhong, backed by the parallel government of the Naga insurgents, and played an instigator role in the Kuki–Naga clashes of 2026.

== History ==
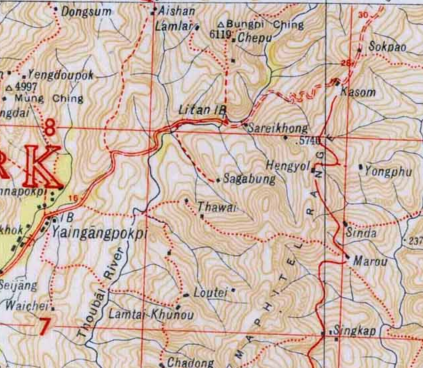
The Litan area in a 1944 survey map; Sharkaphung is marked as "Sagabung"

=== British Raj ===
Sikibung (or Sagabung) was a village in the Ukhrul Sub-Division prior to Indian independence. The 1944 survey map shows it located on a stream called Habu Lok, a left tributary of the Thoubal River. The original location was on the hill slope, about 200–300 m above Thoubal valley floor. While Sikibung was on the right bank of Habu Lok, another village called Thawai was on its left bank (actually on a left tributary stream). Sikibung, along with Thawai and Chepu, was briefly under Japanese occupation during World War II, and was cleared of the invaders in June–July 1944.

Sikibung was acknowledged as a hill village in the Manipur Hill People's (Administration) Regulation (1947). It was placed in Circle No. 2 of the Ukhrul Sub-Division, which corresponds to the modern Kamjong district. It was listed as having a Kuki subvillage with 21 houses and a Tangkhul subvillage with 7 houses. (Note: This seems to indicate that Sikibung, like the neighbouring Sareikhong, was a mixed village headed by a Kuki chief, but the Tangkhuls wished to separate into their own village in 1947. This was a result of the emerging Naga nationalism and the Naga integration movement in Manipur.)

In 1956, the subvillages were listed as separate villages: "Sikibung Tangkhul" or Sikibung (T) and "Sikibung Kuki" or Sikibung (K). While Sikibung (K) stayed at the original location, Sikibung (T) moved down closer to the Thoubal River valley, which also carried Imphal–Ukhrul highway (present NH-202). The 1961 census gave the population of Sikibung (T) as 147 people with 28 households, and the population of Sikibung (K) as 73 people with 14 households. (Note: It is unclear why Sikibung (K) reduced from 21 households to 14 and how Sikibung (T) grew from 7 households to 28.)

In the next census in 1971, Sikibung Kuki was not listed, even though the Survey of India maps continue to show its location. It is possible that Sikibung Kuki had affiliated itself with the neighbouring Sareikhong village.

By 1991 census, Sikibung Tangkhul had grown to a population of 757. (Note: It is likely that the population of Sikibung Kuki resettled in neighbouring Sareikhong, which remained a Kuki village.) It now controlled the entire course of the Habu Lok stream and presumably attracted settlers from the neighbouring Tangkhul villages. By 2001, it was simply called "Sikibung" without the "Tangkhul" suffix.

=== Relations with Sareikhong ===
Sareikhong was another "Kuki village" about 3 km east of Sikibung (T) by aerial distance, which expanded towards the Litan bridge after the Imphal–Ukhrul highway became functional. The Chepu village to the north of the Thoubal River also moved down to the valley next to the bridge. By 1961, there was a large village complex near the bridge, which was listed as "Litan Shepumongkot and Sareikhong" in the census with a population of 530 people. This village cluster was moved to the Ukhrul subdivision (which remains in present-day Ukhrul district), while Sikibung remained in the Phungyar subdivision (now Kamjong district).

Soon after its formation, Sikibung Tangkhul seems to have campaigned for its territorial demarcation. The Court of the Subdivisional Officer of Ukhrul determined in 1947–48 that the boundary between Sikibung and Sareikhong was at the Khoirulok stream (the unlabelled stream in the 1944 map between Sikibung and Sareikhong).

As the Sareikhong village sought official recognition of its status as "Litan Sareikhong" in the 1970s, the Sikibung Tangkhul village objected to it claiming that the Litan Bazar area (on the meander lobe of Litan) was its own territory. It also claimed that chief of Litan Sareikhong was a "Burmese Kuki". A former Manipur government official posted in the region says that the case dragged on for 20 years.

Sikibung Tangkhul claims that there was "1973 settlement agreement", by which Sareikhong was required to pay Rs. 20,000 for control of its area, but paid only half of it, leaving the remainder unpaid. It claims that the agreement was thus aborted and Litan Bazar reverted to being its own territory. Sikibung Tangkhul's claims are backed by Tangkhul Naga Long, the apex body of the Tangkhul community, and the parallel government run by the insurgent group NSCN (IM).

The Sareikhong village did not separate into Kuki and Tangkhul portions, but an essential split seems to have developed there too, with the Kukis moving down to the settlement near the bridge and the Tangkhuls remaining on a hill. The hill subvillage, called Leingangching or S. Laho, is said to have had its "constitution" (Riyan) enacted by Sharkaphung. This seems to indicate that Leingangching had been turned into a subvillage of Sharkaphung, even though it was originally part of Sareikhong. (Note: Leingangching was not separately listed as a village in any census up to 2011. Its population appears to have been included in Sareikhong in the census listings.)

== Demography ==
According to 2011 census, Sharkaphung has 202 households with the total of 1084 people, of which 560 are male and 554 are female. This gives the Sikibung village a decadal population growth rate of 49.12% during 1961–2011, which is higher than the average decadal rate of 37.23% for the hill districts.

Of the total population, 156 were in the age group of 0–6 years. The average sex ratio of the village is 936 female to 1000 male, which is lower than the state average of 985. The literacy rate of the village stands at 74.03%, which is lower than the state average 76.94%. Male literacy rate stands at 80.46%, while female literacy rate was 67.26%.

The inhabitants speak Sarkaphung Tui, which belongs to the Tangkhulic (Naga) language family.

=== People and occupations ===
The village is home to people of Tangkhul Naga tribe. The majority of the inhabitants are Christians. Agriculture is the primary occupation of the inhabitants. Sharkaphung is one of the 44 villages considered likely to be affected as a catchment area when the Mapithel multi purpose project is functional.

== Recent developments ==
=== Poppy cultivation ===
The slopes of the Mapithel hill ranges above the villages have been used for illegal poppy cultivation. The two sloping ridges on the two sides of the Habu Lok stream, called the Leingangching range and Thawai Kuki range, (Note: The "Thawai Kuki range" is to the west of the Habu Lok stream. The name owes to the fact that the Thawai Kuki village used to be located on it (marked as Thawai in the 1944 map), but the village has now moved down to the Thoubal River valley.) have been mentioned to contain 180 acres and 120 acres of poppy fields respectively. The villagers of Leingangching said in 2010 that they were compelled to cultivate poppy owing to the neglect of the government. In 2023, a training programme was conducted by the government on organic farming while also sensitising the attendess on the disadvantages and illegallity of poppy cultivation. Nevertheless, poppy cultivation continues.

=== Land dispute ===
The land dispute between Litan and Sikibung spiralled in 2020 with the government proposing to widen the Imphal–Ukhrul Road (NH-202) to a double-lane road. Sikibung, having claimed the land of Litan Bazar for several years, insisted that it should be compensated for the land lost to the road-widening project instead of Litan Sareikhong. In December 2020, a resident of Litan was said to have been "detained" by villagers of Sikibung owing to the dispute. The people of Litan blocked the Imphal–Ukhrul Road in protest, and the villager was released. The next morning, as the headman of Sikibung went to Litan along with his village authority members, he was attacked by a mob. He escaped to safety in the Litan police station, but tensions flared anyway. According to the KSO-Ukhrul, Sikibung villagers abducted a member of the Litan Sareikhong Double Lane Compensation Committee the previous day, and the Headman was attempting to abduct another member, which was foiled by the people of the village. Its representative stated that a compromise meeting was held a week later under the initiative of MLA Alfred Arthur, and the two village leaders were advised to pursue a legal mechanism for resolving the land dispute.

Headman Kasar of Sikibung filed a writ petition in Manipur High Court seeking direction to the maintenance of village boundary between itself and Sareikhong. In its judgement of 25 March 2021, the High Court confirmed the Khoirulok boundary defined in 1947–48. It made no mention of the Litan Bazar area in the boundary claims, but issued a directive to the Deputy Commissioner of Ukhrul district to maintain the boundary between the two villages. (Note: The judgement was not covered in the media or publicised by the Tangkhul community, until a stray mention in a web commentary five years later. A long video statement made by the headman on 13 February 2026 omitted any mention of the 1947–48 delineation.) Subsequently, the Sikibung and Litan villages formed a "Litan Area Land Committee", which issued an ultimatum to the district authorities to resolve the land issues concerning the two villages.

On 8 October 2024, in the midst of the Manipur conflict, the parallel government of Naga insurgents, GPRN, issued an "administrative order", declaring that Litan Bazar was "part and parcel" of the Sikibung/Sharkaphung village and that the "encroachment" made by Sareikhong was an "illegal settlement" and warrants immediate eviction under Naga customary law. Tangkhul Naga Long followed it up with an eviction notice. There was no immediate response from the Kuki side, but in February 2026, the Committee on Protection of Tribal Areas Manipur – Kuki Hills (COPTAM-KH) rejected GPRN's claims as "factually false and historically fabricated". Threats of "immediate eviction" without due process, it argued, was a violation of fundamental constitutional protections.

During the period of President's Rule between February 2025 – January 2026, Manipur was quiescent, but, as soon as a new elected government was sworn in during February 2026, clashes developed between Litan Sareikhong and Sikibung, which also affected the Kukis and Tangkhuls within Litan.

=== 2026 clashes ===
The trouble began on 7 February with an altercation between a few Tangkhuls and a group of Kukis in Litan Sareikhong, who were described as intoxicated. A Tangkhul man was severely beaten up resulting in his getting hospitalised. After receiving complaints from the victim's family, the Chief of Litan Sareikhong arranged a meeting the next day to settle the matter according to customary practices. However, the family of the injured man failed to show up. Instead, a delegation from Sikibung led by the headman Wungreikhan Kasar, came to demand that those that assaulted the Tangkhul man on 7 February should be handed over to them. The standoff escalated into stone-pelting by both sides, and there were reports of attacks on the house of the chief and those of the assaulters as well as gunfire near the Litan police station. These events led to clashes between the members of the two communities within Litan Sareikhong, and arson of houses during the night. Arson and sporadic gunfire continued for several days and the residents of the Litan and Litan Sareikhong fled their houses. By 14 February, it was reported that 70 houses had been gutted, 100 families had fled their homes to take shelter in neighbouring villages, and the traffic on NH-202 had been disrupted.

Meanwhile, Tangkhul Naga Long declared an "Emergency" on 10 February. Along with the insurgent group NSCN-IM, it claimed the Government of India carrying out "demographic engineering" by creating a "homeland" for Kukis within "Naga areas". It asked the Tangkhul community to cut off all civic ties with the Kukis.

The tensions escalated into serious clashes within a month. On 11 March, two Kuki men were abducted from the village of Thawai Kuki neighbouring Sikibung, and later found murdered. According to police reports, suspected Tangkhul volunteers went to a poppy field in the hills range above Thawai Kuki and destroyed poppy plants and huts. This was followed by an exchange of fire between the volunteers and Thawai Kuki villagers. At the end of the shooting, four Kuki men were found missing. Two of them were later rescued by security forces from the Leingangching village. Two others were found murdered the next day with their battered bodies lying in the forest. Kuki villagers of the neighbouring Shangkai village took 21 Tangkhul people travelling along the highway captive in order to counter the Tangkhul abductions. But, under pressure from community leaders and assurances from security forces, they released them. This was the first instance of hostage-taking as well killings in the 2026 clashes. A Naga organisation called "Khanunithot-Khon" ("Voice of the Naga Youth") issued an "eviction notice" to the Shangkai village, claiming that they were "guests" on Tangkhul ancestral land. The Thawai Tangkhul village claimed that the murdered individuals were not residents of Thawai Kuki according to its own records. It also said that Thawai Kuki could not grant land to Assam Rifles (a security force) without its permission.

On 23 March, Sikibung reported "indiscriminate and sustained firing" that left two civilians injured. Apparently it came from across the Thoubal River from the villages of Shangkai and Mongkot Chepu. Tangkhul Naga Long blamed "Kuki militants" and alleged that Assam Rifles were aiding them.

On 7 April, a confrontation took place between Rapid Action Force (RAF) personnel and women activists of Leingangching. The women reportedly obstructed the personnel from advancing towards a bunker established in the area, and the RAF applied lathi charge, resulting in a serious injury to one activist. On 10 April, a jawan of the Border Security Force stationed at Mongkot Chepu was killed by gunfire that came from an unknown direction. There was intermittent crossfire from both the sides of the valley during the day, the jawan suffered a gunshot injury at the "back" of his left shoulder.

=== Blockades and ambushes ===
On 7 April, the Kuki CSO Working Committee (WCKCSOs) of Ukhrul alleged a "silent but deliberate economic blockade" that the Kuki-inhabited areas of Ukhrul district had been subjected to for two months. It said that essential supplies to the Kuki areas were being blocked at the village of Wunghon, while those meant for Tangkhul areas were allowed passage. Repeated complaints to the authorities including the Litan Police Station failed to yield any result, it said. The Committee gave a 72-hour ultimatum, after which it said the right of free passage along the Imphal–Ukhrul highway would be withdrawn. On 12 April, WCKCSOs withdrew the assurance of free movement.

On 18 April, a convoy of six vehicles proceeding to Ukhrul came under fire in the vicinity of T. M. Kasom village, to the east of Litan, and two Tangkhul men were killed.
