= Litan, Manipur =

Litan Litan Sareikhong
- Village cluster
- Interactive map of Litan
- Location in Manipur, India Litan (India)
- Coordinates: 24.9548°N 94.2021°E
- Country: India
- State: Manipur
- District: Ukhrul

Population (2011)
  - Total: 1,803

Languages
  - Official: Meitei
- Time zone: UTC+5:30 (IST)
- Vehicle registration: MN
- Nearest city: Ukhrul Imphal
- Lok Sabha constituency: Outer Manipur
- Vidhan Sabha constituency: Ukhrul

Litan is a village cluster in Ukhrul district, Manipur, India, consisting of three closely-knit villages, Litan, Mongkot Chepu and Litan Sareikhong. It extends on both banks of Thoubal River, along the Imphal–Ukhrul Road (NH-202), about 35 kilometers (22 mi) from Imphal and 45 kilometers (28 mi) southwest of Ukhrul. Litan is the site of a strategic bridge on the Thoubal River, where the highway moves from its right bank to the left bank while going to Ukhrul. The village was a site of skirmishes during World War II and presently a site of a hot dispute between the Kuki and Naga communities during the Manipur conflict.

== Geography ==
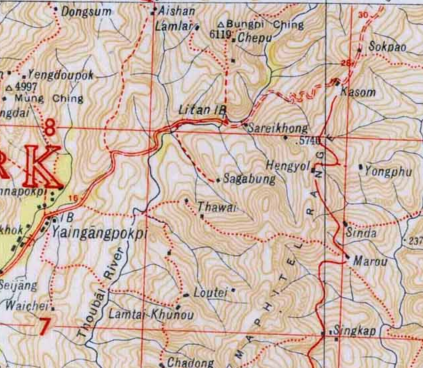
The Litan area in a 1944 survey map. It shows an unlabelled stream joining the Thoubal River to the west of Litan, flanked by the Habu Lok stream on the west and the Sarai Khong stream on the east.

Litan is said to mean "cane bridge" in the Meitei language. This is evidently a reference to a bridge over the Thoubal River that might have existed at this location prior to a modern bridge being constructed during World War II.

The location of the bridge is at entrenched meander of the Thoubal River at the bottom of Leingangching, one of the sloping ridges of the Mapithel Range. The Imphal–Ukhrul Road, which traverses the right bank (west bank or north bank) of Thoubal up to this point, crosses into the lobe of the meander via the Litan bridge, and follows the left bank (east bank or south bank) of Thoubal afterwards. The village of Litan Sareikhong is located on the meander lobe, extending up to the Leingangching ridge. The villages of Mongkot Chepu (or Chepu Mongkot) and Litan are on the right bank of Thoubal, immediately to the west of the Litan bridge.

To the north of Litan is a hill called Bungpi Ching (6119 ft), which is at the southern end of a long mountain range that goes up to Huime. (Note: Sirarakhong and Tuinem are some of the large villages on this ridge.) The Chepu village used to be halfway up the hill of Bungpi Ching, which was also the site of some action during World War II. After the war, the village appears to have moved down to the Thoubal River valley where it assumed the name Mongkot Chepu.

All the three villages are on the southern part of Ukhrul district on the border with the Kamjong district. The latter contains the immediate neighbours of Litan such as Sikibung and Thawai Kuki.

== History ==
=== British Raj ===
In the 19th century, the Thoubal River was apparently crossed by fording, as it was only four inches deep. The left bank (south bank) of Thoubal had a camping ground to accommodate 400 men with all necessities. The Gazetteer of Manipur makes no mention of a bridge at Litan.

In 1942, there was a motorable earth road up to Litan, beyond which only animal transport was possible to Ukhrul. The Sareikhong village which came right after the river crossing was also referred to as the "hamlet of Litan". In preparation for World War II, the Indian Army constructed a motorable bridge at Litan, as well as a rough road to Ukhrul. The first jeep trip to Ukhrul was made in December 1942. The road was still undeveloped even after the war. Frank Kingdon-Ward, travelling up the road in the early 1950s, describes it as "deep and sticky in the shadow of dripping cliffs", where the truck came to a halt several times.

The village of Sareikhong is evidently named after a stream of the same name (but spelt Sarai Khong) which flows east of the Leingangching ridge. A mention of the village appears in 1935, when J. C. Higgins (a political agent of Manipur) recorded having heard the Chinese francolin (called kabo urenbi in Meiteilon) in its vicinity. Historical records of World War II also make mentions of the village. Woodburn Kirby's account of the war identifies Litan with Sareikhong. News reports in July 1944 mention British forces retaking Sareikhong on their way to Ukhrul.

=== Independent period ===
In the 1947 Hill People's Regulation, Sareikhong was listed as a "Kuki village" in Ukhrul Circle No. 2. It had 22 households and a chief called Shoyam Baite. In the 1956 Manipur Gazette, the village was listed as "Litan". Chepu Mongkot was listed in 1947 in Ukhrul Circle No. 1 with 63 households. In the 1961 census, "Litan Shepumongkot and Sareikhong" was listed as a combined village with 95 households and a population of 530 people. This suggests that Sareikhong had grown towards the Litan bridge and effectively merged with Chepu Mongkot. This configuration also had the consequence of moving the entire Litan cluster of villages to Ukhrul Circle No. 1 (corresponding to the modern Ukhrul district). In 1963, Sareikhong was referred to as "Litan Sareikhong".

In the 1971 census, three villages were listed separately: Sareikhong with 52 households, Mongkot Chepu, 100 households, and a new village called "Litan" with only 1 household. Later information reveals the new "Litan" to be a Tangkhul village, established by a certain Deepak Vashum (also called V. S. Deepak).

As "Litan Sareikhong" sought official recognition of its name in the 1970s, its effort seems to have been blocked by the neighbouring Tangkhul villages, the new Litan village of Deepak Vashum as well as the Sikibung Tangkhul village to its west. It was not until 1991 that the name "Litan Sareikhong" was recognised in the census.

Despite being under the control of a Kuki village chief, Litan Sareikhong is a mixed-ethnicity village with Kukis, Tangkhuls, Meiteis and Nepalis living together. In 2011, Ram Muivah, then a state-level administrative officer, called it a "model village" for the whole state where multiple communities lived together in perfect harmony. He pointed out that there was never any instance of conflict or tension among the different communities. This was however a deceptively rosy picture. There was a raging land dispute with the neighbouring Sikibung Tangkhul village even then.

=== Relations with Sikibung ===
About 3 km west of Sarai Khong lies another stream called Habu Lok, also a left tributary of the Thoubal River. The village of Sikibung (or Sagabung), on its bank, was also a "Kuki village" prior to Indian independence. The original location was on the hill slope, about 200–300 m above the Thoubal valley floor. In the 1947 Hill People's Regulation listing, it was listed in Ukhrul Circle No. 2 (corresponding to the modern Kamjong district) with 21 households and a village chief named Hemshei. But the Tangkhuls of Sikibung were in the process of splitting off from the parent village, which was listed separately in 1947 with 7 households. By 1956, the two villages were called "Sikibung Kuki" and "Sikibung Tangkhul" respectively. While Sikibung Kuki stayed at the original location, Sikibung Tangkhul moved down to the Thoubal River valley. Soon after its formation, Sikibung Tangkhul seems to have campaigned for its territorial demarcation. The Court of the Subdivisional Officer of Ukhrul determined in 1947–48 that the boundary between Sikibung and Sareikhong was at the Khoirulok stream. (Note: According to local testimony, the Khoirulok stream is the unlabelled stream in the map lying between the Habu Lok and Sarai Khong streams.)

As the Sareikhong village sought official recognition of its status as "Litan Sareikhong" in the 1970s, the Sikibung Tangkhul village objected to it claiming that the Litan Bazar area (on the meander lobe of Litan) was its own territory. It also claimed that chief of Litan Sareikhong was a "Burmese Kuki". A former Manipur government official posted in the region says that the case dragged on for 20 years.

In recent times, the Sikibung Tangkhul village has claimed that there was "1973 settlement agreement", by which Sareikhong was required to pay Rs. 20,000 for control of the area, but paid only half of it, leaving the remainder unpaid. Hence it claims that the agreement was aborted and Litan Bazar reverted to its own territory. Sikibung Tangkhul's claims are backed by Tangkhul Naga Long, the apex body of the Tangkhul community, and the parallel government run by the insurgent group NSCN (IM).

=== Leingangching ===
Unlike Sikibung, Sareikhong did not separate into Kuki and Tangkhul portions, but scholar Urvashi Butalia points out that, after the Kuki–Naga clashes of the 1990s, the two groups "usually live at some distance from each other, the boundaries not necessarily demarcated but nonetheless clearly maintained". An essential split between the Kukis and Nagas seems to have developed in Litan Sareikhong too, with the Kukis moving down to the settlement near the Litan bridge and the Tangkhuls remaining on a hill location. The hill subvillage, called Leingangching or S. Laho, is said to have had its "constitution" (Riyan) enacted by Sikibung (which now calls itself "Sharkaphung"). This seems to indicate that Leingangching had been turned into a subvillage of Sikibung, even though it was originally part of Sareikhong. (Note: Leingangching was not separately listed as a village in any census up to 2011. Its population appears to have been included in Sareikhong in the census listings.)

== Demographics ==
As per the 2011 census, the Litan Sareikhong has a population of 1000 people living in 158 households and Mongkot Chepu a population of 676 people living in 132 villages. The new Litan village has a population of 127 people living in 27 households. This gives the village cluster an average decadal growth rate of 27.74% during 1961–2011, which is lower than the decadal growth rate of 37.24% for the hill districts of Manipur. (Note: The lower than average growth rate indicates a possible loss of population either due to migration or due to the Kuki–Naga clashes. A state government official reports some Sareikhong Kukis having settled on Nongmaiching Baruni Hill.)

Litan Sareikhong has 85.2% of its population belonging to Scheduled Tribes, whereas the other two villages are almost entirely made up of Scheduled Tribes. Litan Sareikhong has a literacy rate of 83%, Litan 87%, and Mongkot Chepu 58%.

== Recent developments ==
The land dispute between Litan and Sikibung spiralled in 2020 with the government proposing to widen the Imphal–Ukhrul Road (NH-202) to a double-lane road. Sikibung, having claimed the land of Litan Bazar for several years, insisted that it should be compensated for the land lost to the road-widening project instead of Litan Sareikhong. In December 2020, a resident of Litan was said to have been "detained" by villagers of Sikibung owing to the dispute. The people of Litan blocked the Imphal–Ukhrul Road in protest, and the villager was released. The next morning, as the headman of Sikibung went to Litan along with his village authority members, he was attacked by a mob. He escaped to safety in the Litan police station, but tensions flared anyway. According to the KSO-Ukhrul, Sikibung villagers abducted a member of the Litan Sareikhong Double Lane Compensation Committee the previous day, and the Headman was attempting to abduct another member, which was foiled by the people of the village. Its representative stated that a compromise meeting was held a week later under the initiative of MLA Alfred Arthur, and the two village leaders were advised to pursue a legal mechanism for resolving the land dispute.

Headman Kasar of Sikibung filed a writ petition in Manipur High Court seeking direction to the maintenance of village boundary between itself and Sareikhong. In its judgement of 25 March 2021, the High Court confirmed the Khoirulok boundary defined in 1947–48. It made no mention of the Litan Bazar area in the boundary claims, but issued a directive to the Deputy Commissioner of Ukhrul district to maintain the boundary between the two villages. (Note: The judgement was not covered in the media or publicised by the Tangkhul community, until a stray mention in a web commentary five years later. A long video statement made by the headman on 13 February 2026 omitted any mention of the 1947–48 delineation.) Subsequently, the Sikibung and Litan villages formed a "Litan Area Land Committee", which issued an ultimatum to the district authorities to resolve the land issues concerning the two villages.

On 8 October 2024, in the midst of the Manipur conflict, the parallel government of Naga insurgents, GPRN, issued an "administrative order", declaring that Litan Bazar was "part and parcel" of the Sikibung/Sharkaphung village and that the "encroachment" made by Sareikhong was an "illegal settlement" and warrants immediate eviction under Naga customary law. Tangkhul Naga Long followed it up with an eviction notice. There was no immediate response from the Kuki side, but in February 2026, the Committee on Protection of Tribal Areas Manipur – Kuki Hills (COPTAM-KH) rejected GPRN's claims as "factually false and historically fabricated". Threats of "immediate eviction" without due process, it argued, was a violation of fundamental constitutional protections.

During the period of President's Rule between February 2025 – January 2026, Manipur was quiescent, but, as soon as a new elected government was sworn in during February 2026, clashes developed between the Kukis and Tangkhuls in the Litan area.

=== 2026 clashes ===
The trouble began on 7 February with an altercation between a few Tangkhuls and a group of Kukis in Litan Sareikhong, who were described as intoxicated. A Tangkhul man was severely beaten up resulting in his getting hospitalised. After receiving complaints from the victim's family, the Chief of Litan Sareikhong arranged a meeting the next day to settle the matter according to customary practices. However, the family of the injured man failed to show up. Instead, a delegation from Sikibung led by the headman Wungreikhan Kasar, came to demand that those that assaulted the Tangkhul man on 7 February should be handed over to them. The standoff escalated into stone-pelting by both sides, and there were reports of attacks on the house of the chief and those of the assaulters as well as gunfire near the Litan police station. These events led to clashes between the members of the two communities within Litan Sareikhong, and arson of houses during the night. Arson and sporadic gunfire continued for several days and the residents of the Litan and Litan Sareikhong fled their houses. By 14 February, it was reported that 70 houses had been gutted, 100 families had fled their homes to take shelter in neighbouring villages, and the traffic on NH-202 had been disrupted.

Meanwhile, Tangkhul Naga Long declared an "Emergency" on 10 February. Along with the insurgent group NSCN-IM, it claimed the Government of India carrying out "demographic engineering" by creating a "homeland" for Kukis within "Naga areas". It asked the Tangkhul community to cut off all civic ties with the Kukis.

The tensions escalated into serious clashes within a month. On 11 March, two Kuki men were abducted from the village of Thawai Kuki neighbouring Sikibung, and later found murdered. According to police reports, suspected Tangkhul volunteers went to a poppy field in the hills range above Thawai Kuki and destroyed poppy plants and huts. This was followed by an exchange of fire between the volunteers and Thawai Kuki villagers. At the end of the shooting, four Kuki men were found missing. Two of them were later rescued by security forces from the Leingangching village. Two others were found murdered the next day with their battered bodies lying in the forest. Kuki villagers of the neighbouring Shangkai village took 21 Tangkhul people travelling along the highway captive in order to counter the Tangkhul abductions. But, under pressure from community leaders and assurances from security forces, they released them. This was the first instance of hostage-taking as well killings in the 2026 clashes. A Naga organisation called "Khanunithot-Khon" ("Voice of the Naga Youth") issued an "eviction notice" to the Shankai village, claiming that they were "guests" on Tangkhul ancestral land. The Thawai Tangkhul village claimed that the murdered individuals were not residents of Thawai Kuki according to its own records. It also said that Thawai Kuki could not grant land to Assam Rifles (a security force) without its permission.

On 23 March, Sikibung reported "indiscriminate and sustained firing" that left two civilians injured. Apparently it came from across the Thoubal River from the villages of Shangkai and Mongkot Chepu. Tangkhul Naga Long blamed "Kuki militants" and alleged that Assam Rifles were aiding them.

On 7 April, a confrontation took place between Rapid Action Force (RAF) personnel and women activists of Leingangching. The women reportedly obstructed the personnel from advancing towards a bunker established in the area, and the RAF applied lathi charge, resulting in a serious injurity to one activist. On 10 April, a jawan of the Border Security Force stationed at Mongkot Chepu was killed by gunfire that came from an unknown direction. There was intermittent crossfire from both the sides of the valley during the day, the jawan suffered a gunshot injury at the "back" of his left shoulder.

=== Blockades and ambushes ===
On 7 April, the Kuki CSO Working Committee (WCKCSOs) of Ukhrul alleged a "silent but deliberate economic blockade" that the Kuki-inhabited areas of Ukhrul district had been subjected to for two months. It said that essential supplies to the Kuki areas were being blocked at the village of Wunghon, while those meant for Tangkhul areas were allowed passage. Repeated complaints to the authorities including the Litan Police Station failed to yield any result, it said. The Committee gave a 72-hour ultimatum, after which it said the right of free passage along the Imphal–Ukhrul highway would be withdrawn. On 12 April, WCKCSOs withdrew the assurance of free movement.

On 18 April, a convoy of six vehicles proceeding to Ukhrul came under fire from the vicinity of T. M. Kasom village, to the east of Litan, and two Tangkhul men were killed.
