= Scoones =

Scoones is a surname. Notable people with the surname include:

- Eleanor Scoones (1981–2023), English television producer and director
- Geoffry Scoones (1893–1975), British Army officer
- George Scoones (1886–?), English football player and manager
- Peter Scoones (1937–2014), British underwater cameraman
- Reginald Scoones (1900–1991), British Army officer
