= Shangkai =

Shangkai may refer to:

- Shanghai, a city in China
- Shangkai, Manipur, a village in Ukhrul district of Manipur, India
