= Thawai Kuki =

- Village
- Interactive map of Thawai Kuki
- Location in Manipur, India Thawai Kuki (India)
- Coordinates: 24.9421°N 94.1763°E
- Country: India
- State: Manipur
- District: Kamjong
- Elevation: 920 m (3,020 ft)

Population (2011)
  - Total: 337

Languages
  - Spoken: Thadou
- Time zone: UTC+5:30 (IST)
- PIN: 795145
- Vehicle registration: MN
- Nearest city: Ukhrul Imphal
- Lok Sabha constituency: Outer Manipur
- Vidhan Sabha constituency: Phungyar

Thawai Kuki is a Kuki village in Kamjong district, Manipur, India. It is on the bank of the Thoubal River, close to the Imphal–Ukhrul Road (NH-202), about 33 kilometers (21 mi) from Imphal and 47 kilometers (29 mi) southwest of Ukhrul. The village is flanked by Shangkai on the west and Sikibung Tangkhul (or Sharkaphung) in the east. There is also a Thawai Tangkhul village on the Mahadev range on the right bank of the Thoubal River.

== History ==
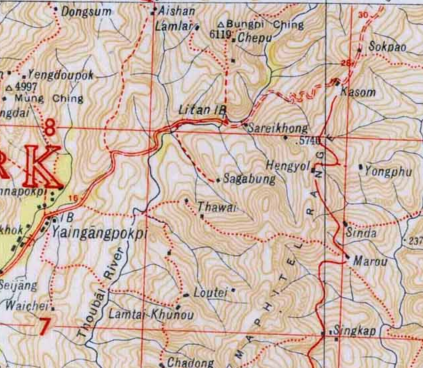
The Litan area in a 1944 survey map; The Habu Lok stream is to the southwest of Litan, with Sagabung and Thawai villages on its banks.

Thawai was a village in the Ukhrul Sub-Division prior to Indian independence. The 1944 survey map shows it located on a tributary stream of Habu Lok, (Note: Alternative spellings: "Habulok" and "Haphulok".) which is itself a left tributary of the Thoubal River flowing down from the Mapithel range. The original location was on the hill slope, about 200–300 m above the Thoubal valley floor. Its boundary was reportedly demarcated in 1921 and shown as extending "from Haphulok Simana in the north to the Thoubal River in the west". The available evidence indicates that the village was inhabited by both Kuki people and Tangkhul Naga people but was under the management of a Kuki chief. (Note: All the villages in this area seem to have had a similar structure, which still persists with Litan Sareikhong to this day.)

Thawai, along with Sikibung and Chepu, was briefly under Japanese occupation during World War II, and was cleared of the invaders in June–July 1944.

The 1947 Manipur Hill People's (Administration) Regulation listed Thawai in Ukhrul Circle No. 2 (corresponding to the modern Kamjong district). Its listing included a Kuki subvillage with 46 houses and a Tangkhul subvillage with 5 houses.

In 1956, the subvillages were listed as separate villages: "Thawai Kuki" and "Thawai Tangkhul". While Thawai Kuki stayed at the original location, Thawai Tangkhul moved across the Thoubal River on to a ridge on its right bank (24.9219°N 94.1532°E). The Thawai Kuki village authority cites an Ukhrul administrative ruling in 1955–56, by which Thawai Tangkhul was compelled to do so.

In later times, Thawai Kuki also moved down along the Habu Lok stream to be closer to the Thoubal River valley. The Imphal–Ukhrul highway (present NH-202) runs on the opposite bank of Thoubal. The neighbouring Sikibung (Sagabung) village also split into Kuki and Tangkhul villages in 1947, with Sikibung Kuki staying at the original location and Sikibung Tangkhul moving down to the Thoubal River valley. The Habu Lok stream separates Thawai Kuki from Sikibung Tangkhul.

The 1961 census gave the population of Thawai Kuki as 215 people with 52 households, and the population of Thawai Tangkhul as 148 people with 26 households. While Thawai Kuki grew to a modest population of 270 by 1991 census, Thawai Tangkhul had grown to a population of 706.

=== Kuki–Naga conflict ===
During the Kuki–Naga clashes of 1990s, Naga militants came to Thawai Kuki and ordered the villagers to leave. The intimidated villagers went to staying at the Sikibung Kuki village. After about a month, the Thawai Tangkhul villagers asked them return to their village again.

The Naga militant group NSCN (IM) gave Thawai Kuki another 'quit notice' on 23 November 2004. Oddly, they are said to have given a 'quit notice' to Thawai Tangkhul six months earlier (which might have been a mistake). In the second instance, they apparently summoned the village leaders to Sikibung Tangkhul, and told them to leave the village before Christmas. The Kuki civil society organisations raised vocal objections and pressured the government to provide security to Thawai Kuki. In addition, the Kuki armed group Kuki National Army withdrew its truce with NSCN (IM), citing the alleged killing of its civil workers at Litan Sareikhong and another cadre at Yaingangpokpi. Security cover was provided to Thawai Kuki for a few months until April 2005 and later withdrawn, presumably under the assessment that the danger had passed.

== Demography ==
According to 2011 census, Thawai Kuki has 69 households with the total of 336 people. Of these 187 people are male and 149 are female. 326 people, or 97 percent of the population, belong to Scheduled Tribes (mostly Kuki-Zo people). Only 16.7 percent of the population is literate. Thawai Tangkhul has a population of 1159 people living in 216 households. The neighbouring Shangkai village is listed in Ukhrul Central Subdivision (present-day Ukhrul district), with a population of 284 people living in 64 households.

== Recent developments ==
=== 2023–2026 Manipur conflict ===
On 3 May 2023, an ethnic conflict erupted between the dominant Meitei community of Manipur and the Kuki-Zo (or Kuki) tribals. All the Kuki tribals were forced to flee the Imphal Valley. While Thawai Kuki was not immediately affected by the conflict, it suffered a raid around 5 am on 18 August, and three village volunteers were gunned down. The police suspected Meitei militants for the attack, and said that they appear to have approached the village from "the hills to the east".

The Nagas chose to remain neutral in the conflict. The incessant violence subsided during the one year of President's Rule during February 2025 – February 2026. As soon as a new elected government was sworn in, a clash developed between the Kukis and Nagas in the Litan area.

The trouble began on 7 February with an altercation between a few Tangkhuls and a group of Kukis in Litan Sareikhong, resulting in a Tangkhul man getting hospitalised. The next day, the Headman of Sikibung Tangkhul (now known as "Sharkaphung") led a delegation to Litan Sareikhong and demanded that the culprits be handed over to him. This caused a standoff, stone-pelting between Kukis and Tangkhuls, and later arson of houses. By 14 February, it was reported that 70 houses had been gutted, 100 families had fled their homes to take shelter in neighbouring villages, and the traffic on NH-202 had been disrupted. Meanwhile, the Tangkhul apex body Tangkhul Naga Long declared an "Emergency" on 10 February. Along with the insurgent group NSCN (IM), it claimed that the Government of India was carrying out "demographic engineering" by creating a "homeland" for Kukis within "Naga areas". It asked the Tangkhul community to cut off all civic ties with the Kukis.

The tensions escalated into serious clashes within a month. On 11 March, two Kuki men were abducted from Thawai Kuki, and were later found murdered. According to police reports, suspected Tangkhul volunteers went to a poppy field in the hills range above Thawai Kuki and destroyed poppy plants and huts. This was followed by an exchange of fire between the volunteers and Thawai Kuki villagers. At the end of the shooting, four Kuki men were found missing. Two of them were later rescued by security forces from the Leingangching village (a Tangkhul village in the Litan area). Two others were found murdered the next day with their battered bodies lying in the forest. Kuki villagers of the neighbouring Shangkai village took 21 Tangkhul people travelling along the highway captive in order to counter the Tangkhul abductions. But, under pressure from community leaders and assurances from security forces, they released them. This was the first instance of hostage-taking as well killings in the 2026 clashes. A Naga organisation called "Khanunithot-Khon" ("Voice of the Naga Youth") issued an "eviction notice" to the Shankai village, claiming that they were "guests" on Tangkhul ancestral land. The Thawai Tangkhul village claimed that the murdered individuals were not residents of Thawai Kuki according to its own records. It also said that Thawai Kuki could not grant land to Assam Rifles (a security force) without its permission.
