= Reginald Scoones =

British Army general

Major-General Sir Reginald Scoones KBE CB DSO
- Scoones in 1960
- Born: 18 December 1900
- Died: October 1991
- Relatives: General Sir Geoffry Scoones (brother)
- Military career
- Allegiance: United Kingdom
- Branch: British Army; British Indian Army
- Service years: 1920–1955
- Rank: Major-General
- Nickname: "Cully"
- Service number: 490
- Units: Royal Fusiliers; Royal Tank Regiment
- Commands: Sudan Defence Force (1950–54); 254th Indian Tank Brigade (1943–45); 42nd Royal Tank Regiment (1941)
- Conflicts: Second World War
- Awards: Knight Commander of the Order of the British Empire; Companion of the Order of the Bath; Distinguished Service Order; Mentioned in Despatches
- Other work: Director, National Trade Defence Association

Major-General Sir Reginald Laurence Scoones, KBE, CB, DSO (18 December 1900 – October 1991) was a British Army officer who served during the Second World War and its aftermath. His older brother was General Sir Geoffry Scoones.

== Early years ==
Reginald Scoones was born in 1900 in the parish of Heston, in Hounslow, Middlesex, England, where his father, Fitzroy Maurice Favre Scoones, was serving as a major in The Royal Fusiliers (City of London Regiment). The family, which included his mother, Florence (born in New South Wales, Australia), and older brothers Geoffry Allen Percival Scoones, Thomas Cohn Scoones (who would be commissioned as a second-lieutenant from the ranks of the London Regiment and awarded the Military Cross during the First World War while serving as an officer in the Gordon Highlanders, being promoted to lieutenant, and acting captain while in command of a company and then while employed as an adjutant at the Corps Infantry School from 23 September 1918, and as an aide de camp from 8 April 1919. He relinquished the last appointment and was returned to the establishment of his regiment at his substantive rank on 3 September 1919, was placed on the Half-Pay List due to ill health in 1922, and retired on retired pay, on account of ill-health caused by wounds, 6 January 1923, and was granted the rank of captain) and Valentine Fitzmaurice Scoones (who would die aged 20 on the 18 August 1916, as a second-lieutenant, acting captain, in the 3rd Battalion of the Black Watch (Royal Highlanders)), lived, at the time, at The Hermitage, on Sutton Lane in Heston. His father was posted to the Bermuda Garrison with the 3rd Battalion, arriving aboard the troopship Dominion at the start of December, 1903, along with Major CJ Stanton, Lieutenant F Moore, and Second-Lieutenant George Ernest Hawes of the same battalion (the remainder of the battalion of sixteen officers, one warrant officer, and 937 non-commissioned officers and other ranks under Lieutenant-colonel Gaisford, arrived separately on the troopship SS Dunera, from Egypt). The battalion was first posted to Boaz Island His father was subsequently appointed camp commandant, Warwick Camp. A detachment of 112 men of the 3rd Battalion under Major Scoones departed from the Royal Naval Dockyard, Bermuda aboard the troopship Kensington on 13 October 1905, for Aldershot, along with the 3rd Battalion of the King's Royal Rifle Corps, 3rd Company Royal Engineers, a detachment of 36 Company Royal Engineers, and various time-served and other personnel.

Reginald Scoones was educated at Wellington College and the Royal Military College, Sandhurst. He was first commissioned into the Royal Fusiliers before joining the Royal Tank Regiment in 1923. In 1928, he was seconded to the Sudan Defence Force and commanded the machine-gun battery. In 1935, back in England, he became the adjutant of the 1st Royal Tank Regiment, and by early 1939 had completed a four-month spell as staff captain on the staff of the Mobile Division in Egypt.

== Second World War ==
At the outbreak of the war, Scoones was working as a brigade major in Cairo before moving to the staff of the Western Desert Force as GSO2 in 1940. In 1941 he was appointed an Officer of the Order of the British Empire and, after a short period as second in command of the 6th Royal Tank Regiment, was appointed commander of 42nd Royal Tank Regiment, part of 7th Armoured Division fighting in the Western Desert. After a stint first as a GSO1 and then as a deputy director of military training at the War Office in London, he was sent to India and assigned to command the 254th Indian Tank Brigade on 17 November 1943. The brigade, consisting of M3 Lee tanks and Stuart tanks, was soon in action at the Battle of Imphal, serving under General William Slim and Scoones's brother, Geoffry Scoones, who was commanding the IV Corps. He was awarded the Distinguished Service Order in 1945 for his "gallant and distinguished services in Burma". He was also mentioned in despatches. He relinquished command on 14 March 1945. In July 1945 his substantive rank was raised to colonel.

== Post-war ==
After the war, Scoones became deputy director of military training at the War Office. In 1947 he returned to Sudan as second-in-command of the Sudan Defence Force. In November 1949 his temporary brigadier's rank was made permanent, and he assumed command of the Sudan Defence Force in 1950 in the temporary rank of major-general, in which capacity he also served on the executive council of Sudan. He was appointed a Companion of the Order of the Bath in 1951, and his major-general's rank made substantive in that same year. He was to be the last British commander in the Sudan and, in November 1954, he handed command over to Lieutenant-general Ahmed Mohamed. Scoones was knighted as a Knight Commander of the Order of the British Empire for his services in the 1955 New Year Honours. He retired from the army in 1955 and in 1957 became the director of the National Trade Defence Association, a trade organization representing publicans, which position he held until 1969. Scoones died aged 90 in October 1991.
