= 254th Indian Tank Brigade =

- Active: 1941–1945
- Country: (British Raj) British India
- Allegiance: British Empire
- Branch: British Indian Army
- Type: Armoured
- Size: Brigade
- Equipment: Stuart tank M3 Lee tank M4 Sherman tank
- Engagements: Battle of Kohima; Battle of Imphal; Battle of Meiktila and Mandalay; Battle of Kyaukmaung Bridgehead; Operation Dracula
- Battle honours: Burma 1944–1945

The 254th Indian Tank Brigade was an armoured brigade of the Indian Army during World War II.

This brigade was originally raised at the cavalry depot at Risalpur in India with effect from 1 April 1941 as the 4th Indian Armoured Brigade. In October 1941, the brigade was redesignated as the 254th Indian Armoured Brigade, and then from 10 September 1942 it was retitled as the 254th Indian Tank Brigade.

The brigade was part of the Fourteenth Army and saw action in the Burma Campaign. The 254th Tank Brigade's tactical sign was a symbol that looks like black railway tracks disappearing into the distance, on a red triangle.

The brigade fought with the 5th and 7th Indian Infantry Divisions in Burma and was involved in the Battles at Imphal, Kohima, Kyaumaung Bridgehead, Meiktila, and the Rangoon Road.

In June 1945, the brigade moved back to India. The Brigade's designation changed to 3rd Indian Independent Armoured Brigade on 1 December 1945, then in June 1946 to 3rd Indian Armoured Brigade [Independent] which was the designation in August 1947 at the time of Indian Independence.

== Formation (1944) ==
- 3rd Carabiniers, Lee tanks
- 149th Regiment Royal Armoured Corps, Grant and Sherman tanks, raised from 7th Battalion of the King's Own Yorkshire Light Infantry
- 150th Royal Armoured Corps Regiment, Lee tanks, raised from 10th Bn York and Lancaster Regiment
- 7th Light Cavalry, Stuart tanks
- 3/4th Bombay Grenadiers

== Commanders ==
- Brigadier WT Gill Apr 1941 – 17 Nov 1943
- Brigadier RL Scoones 18 Nov 1943 – 14 Mar 1945
- Brigadier WWA Loring 15 Mar 1945 - Aug 1947

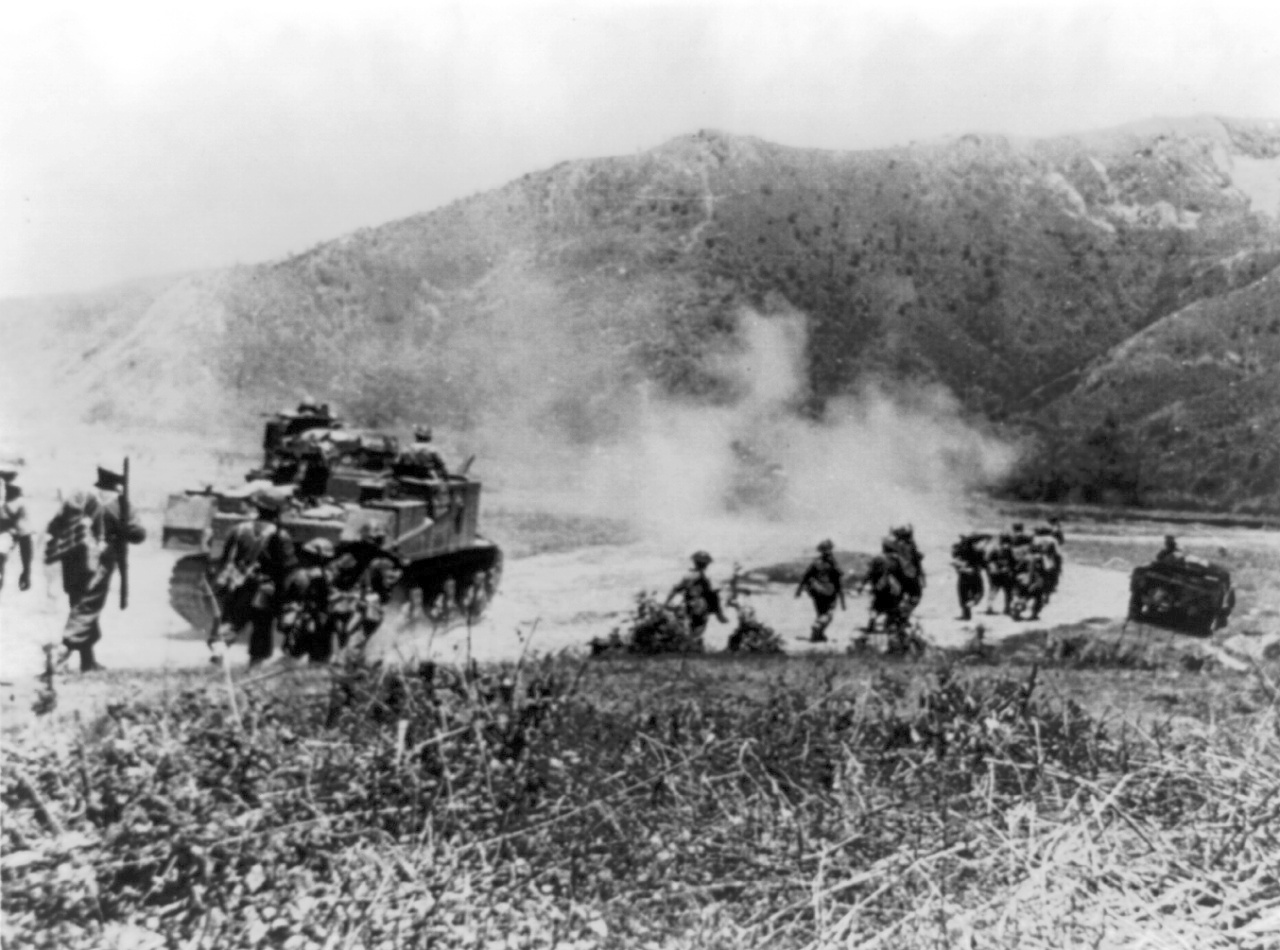
Lee tank and Gurkhas advance at Imphal

== See also ==
- List of Indian Army Brigades in World War II
