= Geoffry Scoones =

British Indian Army officer

General Sir Geoffry Scoones KCB KBE CSI DSO MC
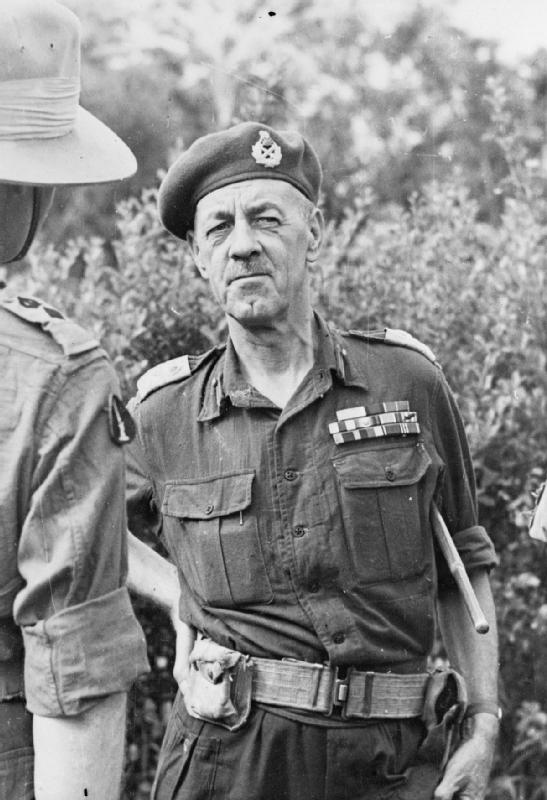
- Scoones in September 1944
- Born: 25 January 1893; Karachi, British India
- Died: 19 September 1975 (aged 82); Cambridge, Cambridgeshire, England
- Relatives: Sir Reginald Scoones (brother)
- Military career
- Allegiance: United Kingdom
- Branch: Indian Army
- Service years: 1912–1949
- Rank: General
- Service number: 40494
- Units: 2nd King Edward VII's Own Gurkha Rifles (The Sirmoor Rifles); 8th Gurkha Rifles
- Commands: Central Command (India) (1944–1946); Southern Command (India) (1944); IV Corps (1942–1944); 19th Indian Infantry Division (1942); 5th Indian Brigade (1936); 2nd Battalion 8th Gurkha Rifles (1935–1936)
- Conflicts: First World War; North-West Frontier; Second World War
- Awards: Knight Commander of the Order of the Bath; Knight Commander of the Order of the British Empire; Companion of the Order of the Star of India; Companion of the Distinguished Service Order; Military Cross; Mentioned in Despatches (3)

General Sir Geoffry Allen Percival Scoones, KCB, KBE, CSI, DSO, MC (also spelt Geoffrey; 25 January 1893 – 19 September 1975) was a senior officer in the Indian Army during the Second World War.

== Early life and education ==
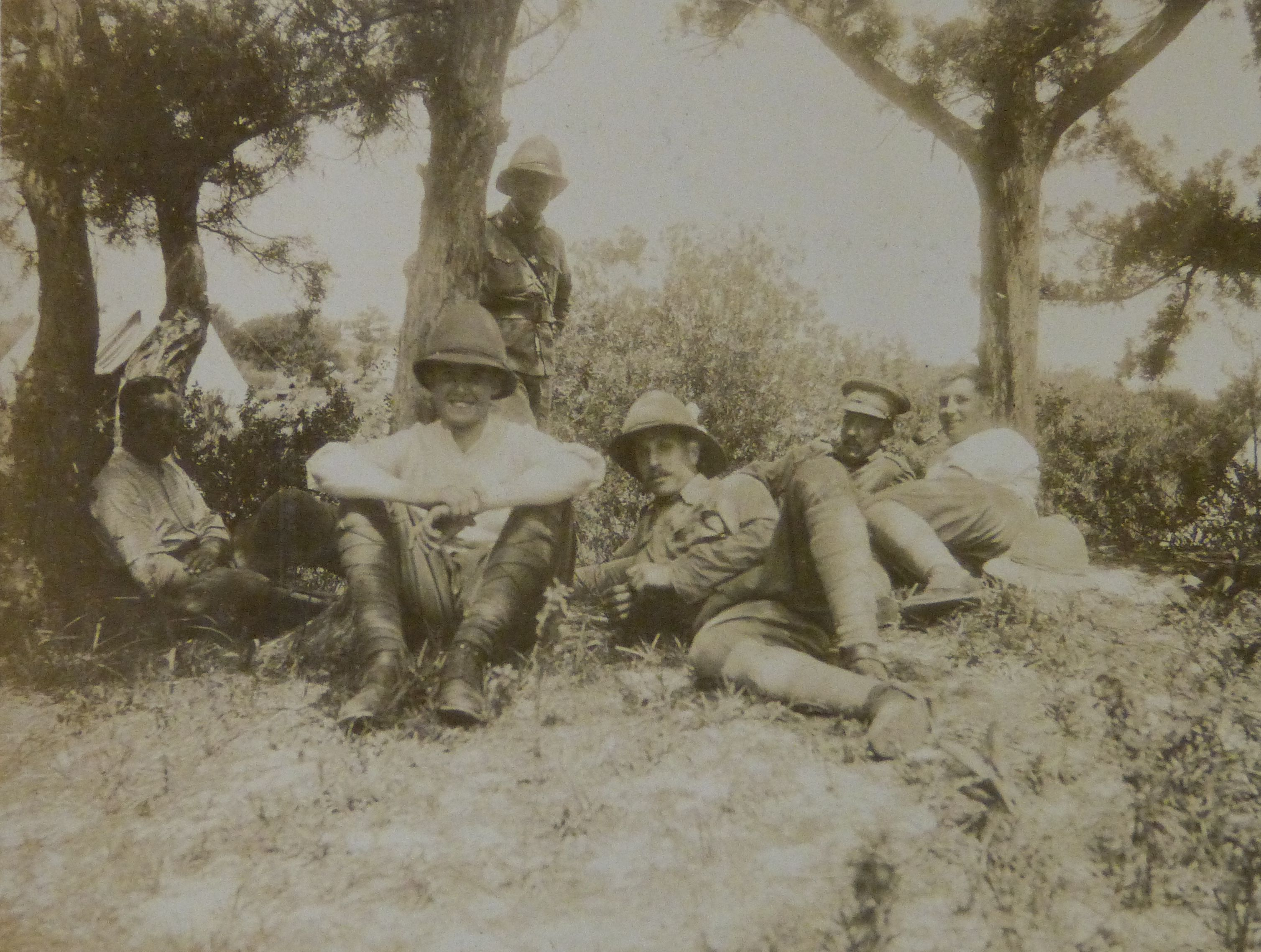
Major Fitzroy Maurice Favre Scoones (third from left) during 3rd Battalion Royal Fusiliers training at Tucker's Town, Bermuda, in 1904

Scoones was born in Karachi, British India, the eldest son of Fitzmaurice Thomas Favre Scoones of the Royal Fusiliers and his wife, Florence Osborne, who was born in New South Wales, Australia. His younger brother was Sir Reginald "Cully" Scoones. In 1901 Scoones, with his father, his mother, and his brothers Thomas, Valentine (who would die aged 20 on 18 August 1916, as a Second-Lieutenant, acting Captain, in the 3rd Battalion of the Black Watch (Royal Highlanders)), and Reginald, lived in the parish of Heston, in Hounslow, Middlesex, England, at The Hermitage, Sutton Lane. His father was posted to the Bermuda Garrison with the 3rd Battalion the Royal Fusiliers, arriving aboard the troopship Dominion at the start of December 1903, along with Major CJ Stanton, Lieutenant F Moore, and Second-Lieutenant George Ernest Hawes of the same battalion (the remainder of the battalion of sixteen officers, one warrant officer, and 937 non-commissioned officers and other ranks under Lieutenant-Colonel Gaisford, arrived separately on the troopship HMT Dunera from Egypt). The battalion was first posted to Boaz Island. His father was subsequently appointed Camp Commandant, Warwick Camp. A detachment of 112 men of the 3rd Battalion under Major Scoones departed from the Royal Naval Dockyard, Bermuda aboard the troopship Kensington on 13 October 1905, for Aldershot, along with the 3rd Battalion of the King's Royal Rifle Corps, 3rd Company Royal Engineers, a detachment of 36 Company Royal Engineers, and various time-served and other personnel. Scoones was educated at Wellington College and the Royal Military College, Sandhurst.

== Military career ==
=== First World War and inter-war period ===
Scoones was commissioned a second lieutenant on the unattached list for the Indian Army on 20 January 1912. He was accepted into the Indian Army and appointed to the 2nd Battalion 2nd King Edward VII's Own Gurkha Rifles (The Sirmoor Rifles) on 8 March 1913. He was promoted to lieutenant on 20 April 1914. He saw active service in the First World War, becoming aide-de-camp to the Commander of 7th (Meerut) Division, then aide-de-camp to the commander 21st Division and finally aide-de-camp to the Army Corps Commander, 2nd Army Corps in France, between 8 September 1915 and 10 July 1917. Promoted to captain on 20 January 1916, he became a brigade major in India on 27 October 1917. He was mentioned in despatches three times, appointed a Companion of the Distinguished Service Order and awarded the Military Cross.

After the war, Scoones saw service during the Afghanistan North West Frontier operations in 1919. After attending the Staff College, Quetta from 1922 to 1923, he served as a brigade major in India from 3 March 1924 to 30 November 1926 and then became a general staff officer. Promoted to brevet major on 7 January 1925, he transferred to the 1st Battalion 2nd Gurkha Rifles on 22 January 1928 He was promoted to major on 20 January 1929, and to brevet lieutenant colonel on 1 January 1933. After attending the Imperial Defence College, from 14 February 1935 to 23 April 1938 he was made commanding officer of the 2nd Battalion the 8th Gurkha Rifles. He was appointed an Officer of the Order of the British Empire for earthquake work at Quetta in 1935.

=== Second World War ===
Scoones served in the Second World War initially as a general staff officer on the Directorate of Military Operations and Intelligence. On 17 May 1940 he was appointed deputy director of military operations, India. The following year, he became director of military operations and intelligence, India.

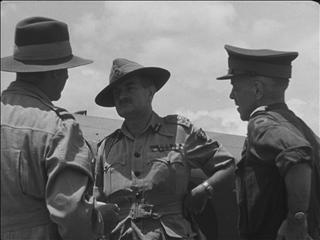
General William Slim, General Officer Commanding 14th Army arrives at Imphal airstrip and chats to Air Commodore Stanley Vincent, Air Officer Commanding 221 Group RAF and Lieutenant-General Scoones, General Officer Commanding IV Indian Corps, before meeting American generals.

In 1942, Scoones briefly commanded the Indian 19th Infantry Division before being promoted to lieutenant-general and appointed to command IV Corps, part of William Slim's Fourteenth Army. This corps defended Imphal in Manipur, on the frontier between India and Japanese-held Burma. It also had responsibility for a large rearguard area, and a very large tract of unmapped and trackless jungle-covered frontier. He was appointed a Companion of the Order of the Star of India in 1942.

Scoones commanded the corps through the gruelling Battle of Imphal. In December 1944 he and his fellow corps commanders Montagu Stopford and Philip Christison were knighted and invested as Knights Commander of the Order of the British Empire by the viceroy Lord Wavell at a ceremony at Imphal in front of the Scottish, Gurkha and Punjab regiments. Slim was knighted and invested as Knight Commander of the Order of the Bath at the same occasion. Slim valued Scoones as a defensive commander, but when the Fourteenth Army went onto the offensive after Imphal he wanted a more aggressive and less calculating commander for IV Corps. Scoones was appointed to Central Command, India. He was promoted to general in 1946.

=== Post-war ===
In 1947 Scoones was briefly the last Military Secretary to the India Office. He was appointed a Knight Commander of the Order of the Bath in 1947, and later in the year he became Principal Staff Officer at the Commonwealth Relations Office. Between 1947 and 1949 he was also aide-de-camp to King George VI. From 1953 to 1957, he was High Commissioner to New Zealand.

== Sources ==
- Mead, Richard (2007). Churchill's Lions: a biographical guide to the key British generals of World War II. Stroud (UK): Spellmount. ISBN 978-1-86227-431-0.
- Smart, Nick (2005). Biographical Dictionary of British Generals of the Second World War. Barnesley: Pen & Sword. ISBN 1844150496.
- Indian Army List Supplement 1941.
- Quarterly Army List for quarter ending 31st March 1922.
- Generals of World War II

Military offices
Preceded by John Smyth	GOC 19th Indian Infantry Division; 1941–1942	Succeeded by Thomas Rees
Preceded by Noel Irwin	GOC IV Corps; 1942–1944	Succeeded by Sir Frank Messervy
Preceded by Henry Willcox	GOC-in-C Central Command, India; 1944–1946	Post abolished
Preceded by Sir Mosley Mayne	Military Secretary to the India Office; 1947	Post abolished
