= Alfred Kan-Ngam Arthur =

Indian politician

Member of Parliament, Lok Sabha
- Incumbent
- Assumed office 2024
- Preceded by: Lorho S. Pfoze
- Constituency: Outer Manipur

Member of Manipur Legislative Assembly
- In office 2017–2022
- Preceded by: Danny Shaiza
- Succeeded by: Ram Muivah
- Constituency: Ukhrul

Personal details
- Born: 10 December 1976 (age 49) Shangshak, Ukhrul, India
- Party: Indian National Congress
- Occupation: Politician

Alfred Kan-Ngam Arthur is an Indian politician from Manipur. He is currently serving as Member of Parliament, Lok Sabha from Outer Manipur. He is a former member of Manipur Legislative Assembly from Ukhrul.

== Early life ==
Alfred Kan-Ngam Arthur is the second son of AS Arthur who is a retired bureaucrat and a politician from Shangshak Phunghon village in Ukhrul district. Prior to joining politics, Alfred had a short stint as a musician and vocalist in a rock band and thereafter turned to social work and investigative journalism. He joined electoral politics when he contested the 2012 elections to the Manipur Legislative Assembly as a Congress candidate. He lost the elections to his nearest rival, Samuel Risom from the Naga People's Front by a narrow margin of 56 votes.

== Political career ==
As a legislator, Alfred is considered one of the most vocal members in the house. The improvement of government-run educational institutions in Ukhrul district and revamping of Ukhrul District Hospital are attributed as outcome of Alfred's constant arguments and reminders in the state Assembly. Pettigrew College, one of the oldest colleges in Manipur and the only government college in Ukhrul district which was in a dysfunctional state was revived through the initiative of Alfred. He is also considered a strong advocate for youth reformation and empowerment owing to his active involvement in several youth related activities.
