= Ram Muivah =

Indian bureaucrat and politician

Member of the Manipur Legislative Assembly
- Incumbent
- Assumed office 2022
- Preceded by: Alfred Kan-Ngam Arthur
- Constituency: Ukhrul

Secretary of North Eastern Council of Ministry of Development of North Eastern Region
- In office 10 September 2015 – 23 October 2019
- Appointed by: Appointments Committee of the Cabinet
- Succeeded by: K Moses Chalai

Personal details
- Born: Ramnganing Muivah; 1 March 1960 (age 66) Manipur, India
- Party: Naga People's Front
- Parent: Khashim Muivah (father)
- Education: (B.A.) (M.A.) North Eastern Hill University (MBA) University of Birmingham
- Profession: Politician, former Bureaucrat

Ramnganing Muivah (born 1 March 1960) is an Indian politician and retired IAS officer from the 1985 batch of the Manipur cadre. He was elected to the Manipur Legislative Assembly from Ukhrul in 2022 Manipur Legislative Assembly election as a member of Naga People's Front.

== Early life and education ==
Ramnganing Muivah was born on 1 March 1960 in Manipur, India. He completed his B.A. and M.A. from North-Eastern Hill University and his MBA in public service from the University of Birmingham in UK.

== Civil Service career ==
Muivah is a 1985 batch Indian Administrative Service officer from Manipur cadre.

He has served in various secretarial positions in the such as Additional Chief Secretary, Principal Secretary and as Special Secretary etc in the Government of Manipur. His tenure as Principal Secretary in Health & Family Welfare Ministry of Manipur Government was noted with low infant mortality rate in Manipur State.

In Government of India while in Central Deputation he served as Joint Secretary of Department of Financial Services in Finance Ministry of India from 2001 to 2006. He also served as Joint Secretary in Ministry of Urban Development of India from 2008 to 2010.

In 2015, Central Government appointed Muivah as Secretary of North Eastern Council. He served in that position until 2019. Under his tenure the council took several infrastructural projects for the development of North Eastern region.

In 2020, Muivah retired from Indian Administrative Service.
