= Ukhrul Assembly constituency =

Legislative Assembly constituency in Manipur State, India

Coordinates: 25.1°N 94.37°E

Ukhrul
- Constituency for the Manipur Legislative Assembly

Constituency details
- Country: India
- Region: Northeast India
- State: Manipur
- District: Ukhrul
- Lok Sabha constituency: Outer Manipur
- Established: 1967
- Total electors: 48,307
- Reservation: ST

Member of Legislative Assembly
- 12th Manipur Legislative Assembly
- Incumbent Ram Muivah
- Party: NPF
- Alliance: NDA
- Elected year: 2022

Ukhrul is one of the 60 Legislative Assembly constituencies of Manipur state in India.

It is part of Ukhrul district and is reserved for candidates belonging to the Scheduled Tribes.

== Members of the Legislative Assembly ==
Year	Member	Party
2012	Danny Shaiza	Independent politician
2017	Alfred Kan-Ngam Arthur	Indian National Congress
2022	Ram Muivah	Naga People's Front

== Election results ==
Vote share of winning candidates
2022	38.69%
2017	35.88%
2012	21.74%
2007	39.42%
2002	51.38%
2000	50.57%
1995	48.79%
1990	44.36%
1984	24.37%
1980	48.91%
1974	52.41%
1972	59.38%
1967	87.01%

=== 2027 Assembly election ===
2027 Manipur Legislative Assembly election: Ukhrul
Party	Candidate	Votes	%	±%
INC				
NDA				
NOTA	None of the above			
Majority				
Turnout				
gain from		Swing		

=== Assembly Election 2022 ===
2022 Manipur Legislative Assembly election: Ukhrul
Party	Candidate	Votes	%	±%
NPF	Ram Muivah	15,503	38.69%	11.00%
INC	Alfred Kan-Ngam Arthur	14,561	36.34%	0.45%
BJP	Somatai Shaiza	9,961	24.86%	−10.10%
Margin of victory		942	2.35%	1.43%
Turnout		40,073	82.95%	5.98%
Registered electors		48,307		15.92%
NPF gain from INC		Swing	2.81%	

=== Assembly Election 2017 ===
2017 Manipur Legislative Assembly election: Ukhrul
Party	Candidate	Votes	%	±%
INC	Alfred Kan-Ngam Arthur	11,510	35.88%	14.45%
BJP	Somatai Shaiza	11,214	34.96%	16.98%
NPF	Samuel Risom	8,883	27.69%	5.95%
LJP	Worthington Mahung	310	0.97%	
Margin of victory		296	0.92%	0.61%
Turnout		32,078	76.98%	15.24%
Registered electors		41,673		15.80%
INC gain from NPF		Swing	14.14%	

=== Assembly Election 2012 ===
2012 Manipur Legislative Assembly election: Ukhrul
Party	Candidate	Votes	%	±%
NPF	Samuel Risom	4,831	21.74%	
INC	Alfred Kan-Ngam Arthur	4,761	21.43%	−10.82%
BJP	Danny Shaiza	3,995	17.98%	
AITC	S. Somatai	3,516	15.83%	
MSCP	Aleng A. S. Shimray	2,751	12.38%	
NCP	Aleng A. S. Shimray	2,360	10.62%	
Margin of victory		70	0.32%	−6.86%
Turnout		22,218	61.73%	−11.43%
Registered electors		35,987		1.09%
NPF gain from Independent		Swing	-17.67%	

=== Assembly Election 2007 ===
2007 Manipur Legislative Assembly election: Ukhrul
Party	Candidate	Votes	%	±%
Independent	Danny Shaiza	10,267	39.42%	
INC	A. S. Arthur	8,399	32.25%	−1.31%
Independent	A. S. Shimreiyo	7,129	27.37%	
LJP	Haokhongam Guite	140	0.54%	
Margin of victory		1,868	7.17%	−10.65%
Turnout		26,047	73.17%	−7.32%
Registered electors		35,600		18.66%
Independent gain from BJP		Swing	-11.97%	

=== Assembly Election 2002 ===
2002 Manipur Legislative Assembly election: Ukhrul
Party	Candidate	Votes	%	±%
BJP	Danny Shaiza	12,285	51.38%	0.82%
INC	A. S. Arthur	8,023	33.56%	11.81%
FPM	A. S. Shimreiyo	3,601	15.06%	
Margin of victory		4,262	17.83%	−10.99%
Turnout		23,909	80.48%	−2.24%
Registered electors		30,002		4.80%
BJP hold		Swing	2.59%	

=== Assembly Election 2000 ===
2000 Manipur Legislative Assembly election: Ukhrul
Party	Candidate	Votes	%	±%
BJP	Danny Shaiza	10,578	50.57%	
INC	A. S. Arthur	4,549	21.75%	−27.05%
MSCP	K. S. Zimik	2,836	13.56%	
Independent	Thongkam Haokip	1,384	6.62%	
SAP	A. S. Shimreiyo	1,260	6.02%	−4.33%
Independent	Nguljalen Haolai	195	0.93%	
Margin of victory		6,029	28.82%	20.88%
Turnout		20,919	73.95%	−8.78%
Registered electors		28,627		14.43%
BJP gain from INC		Swing	1.77%	

=== Assembly Election 1995 ===
1995 Manipur Legislative Assembly election: Ukhrul
Party	Candidate	Votes	%	±%
INC	A. S. Arthur	9,982	48.79%	10.56%
JD	Danny Shaiza	8,358	40.85%	
SAP	Ako Shaiza	2,118	10.35%	
Margin of victory		1,624	7.94%	1.81%
Turnout		20,458	82.72%	−2.95%
Registered electors		25,016		18.97%
INC gain from JD		Swing	4.43%	

=== Assembly Election 1990 ===
1990 Manipur Legislative Assembly election: Ukhrul
Party	Candidate	Votes	%	±%
JD	Hangmi Shaiza	7,922	44.36%	
INC	A. S. Arthur	6,828	38.23%	16.96%
MPP	Kongsui Luithui	2,988	16.73%	−1.94%
Manipur Hill People'S Council	V. Weapon Zimik	120	0.67%	
Margin of victory		1,094	6.13%	5.85%
Turnout		17,858	85.68%	5.28%
Registered electors		21,027		3.09%
JD gain from Independent		Swing	19.99%	

=== Assembly Election 1984 ===
1984 Manipur Legislative Assembly election: Ukhrul
Party	Candidate	Votes	%	±%
Independent	A. S. Arthur	3,916	24.37%	
Independent	Lungshim Shaiza	3,871	24.09%	
INC	S. Zingthan	3,418	21.27%	
MPP	Kongsui Luithui	3,000	18.67%	
Independent	Envey (K. Envey)	1,225	7.62%	
Independent	Aso Shimaray	638	3.97%	
Margin of victory		45	0.28%	−8.81%
Turnout		16,068	80.39%	2.95%
Registered electors		20,397		22.19%
Independent gain from JP		Swing	-24.54%	

=== Assembly Election 1980 ===
1980 Manipur Legislative Assembly election: Ukhrul
Party	Candidate	Votes	%	±%
JP	Yangmaso Shaiza	6,191	48.91%	
INC(I)	S. Zingthan	5,040	39.82%	
Independent	S. W. Tharmi	1,315	10.39%	
Independent	Hemkholam	111	0.88%	
Margin of victory		1,151	9.09%	4.28%
Turnout		12,657	77.44%	−0.46%
Registered electors		16,693		29.38%
JP gain from Manipur Hills Union		Swing	-3.49%	

=== Assembly Election 1974 ===
1974 Manipur Legislative Assembly election: Ukhrul
Party	Candidate	Votes	%	±%
Manipur Hills Union	Yangmaso Shaiza	5,201	52.41%	
INC	K. Envey	4,723	47.59%	19.89%
Margin of victory		478	4.82%	−26.86%
Turnout		9,924	77.90%	3.86%
Registered electors		12,902		38.06%
Manipur Hills Union gain from Independent		Swing	-6.97%	

=== Assembly Election 1972 ===
1972 Manipur Legislative Assembly election: Ukhrul
Party	Candidate	Votes	%	±%
Independent	Yangmaso Shaiza	4,055	59.38%	
INC	L. Solomon	1,892	27.71%	−59.31%
Independent	T. Khathing	882	12.92%	
Margin of victory		2,163	31.67%	−42.35%
Turnout		6,829	74.04%	40.89%
Registered electors		9,345		−16.17%
Independent gain from INC		Swing	-27.63%	

=== Assembly Election 1967 ===
1967 Manipur Legislative Assembly election: Ukhrul
Party	Candidate	Votes	%	±%
INC	L. Solomon	2,995	87.01%	
Independent	P. Mingthing	447	12.99%	
Margin of victory		2,548	74.03%	
Turnout		3,442	33.14%	
Registered electors		11,148		
INC win (new seat)				

== See also ==
- List of constituencies of the Manipur Legislative Assembly
- Ukhrul district
