= SS Dunera =

History

United Kingdom
- Name: Dunera
- Owner: British India Associated Steamers Ltd., Glasgow; British India Steam Navigation Company Ltd., Glasgow
- Port of registry: Glasgow, United Kingdom
- Builder: A & J Inglis Ltd., Glasgow
- Yard number: 215
- Launched: 12 March 1891
- Out of service: 1922
- Identification: Official Number 98623
- Fate: Scrapped 1922, Shanghai

General characteristics
- Class & type: Troopship
- Type: Steel Screw Steamer
- Tonnage: 5,413 GRT; 3,457 NRT
- Length: 425 ft 00 in (129.54 m)
- Beam: 48 ft 00 in (14.63 m)
- Draught: 30 ft 00 in (9.14 m)
- Propulsion: Steam T3cy1 (33, 52, 86.5 x 60in), 621 nhp, 1-screw

== Voyages ==
=== 1900 Voyage from Southampton to Alexandria and back ===
The SS Dunera was a British troopship.

The details of a planned voyage of the SS Dunera were printed in the Daily Malta Chronicle on 7 February 1900:

MOVEMENTS

The following is the programme of S.S. Dunera, which will convey the 2nd Batt. Leicester Regt. from Queenstown to Alexandria, and the 2nd Batt. R. West Kent Regt. thence to England en route to South Africa, also details to and from Mediterranean port : -

Arrive	Port	Leave
-	Southampton	5 Feb:
6 Feb	Queenstown	7 "
11 "	Gibraltar	12 "
15 "	Malta	16 "
19 "	Alexandria	20 "
23 "	Malta	24 "
27 "	Gibraltar	28"
4 March	Southampton	-

NB. Queenstown is now called Cobh and is in County Cork.
