= Battle of Imphal =

Battle between Japanese and Allied forces in 1944

Battle of Imphal (Meitei: Japan Laan)
- Part of Operation U-Go during the Burma campaign of World War II
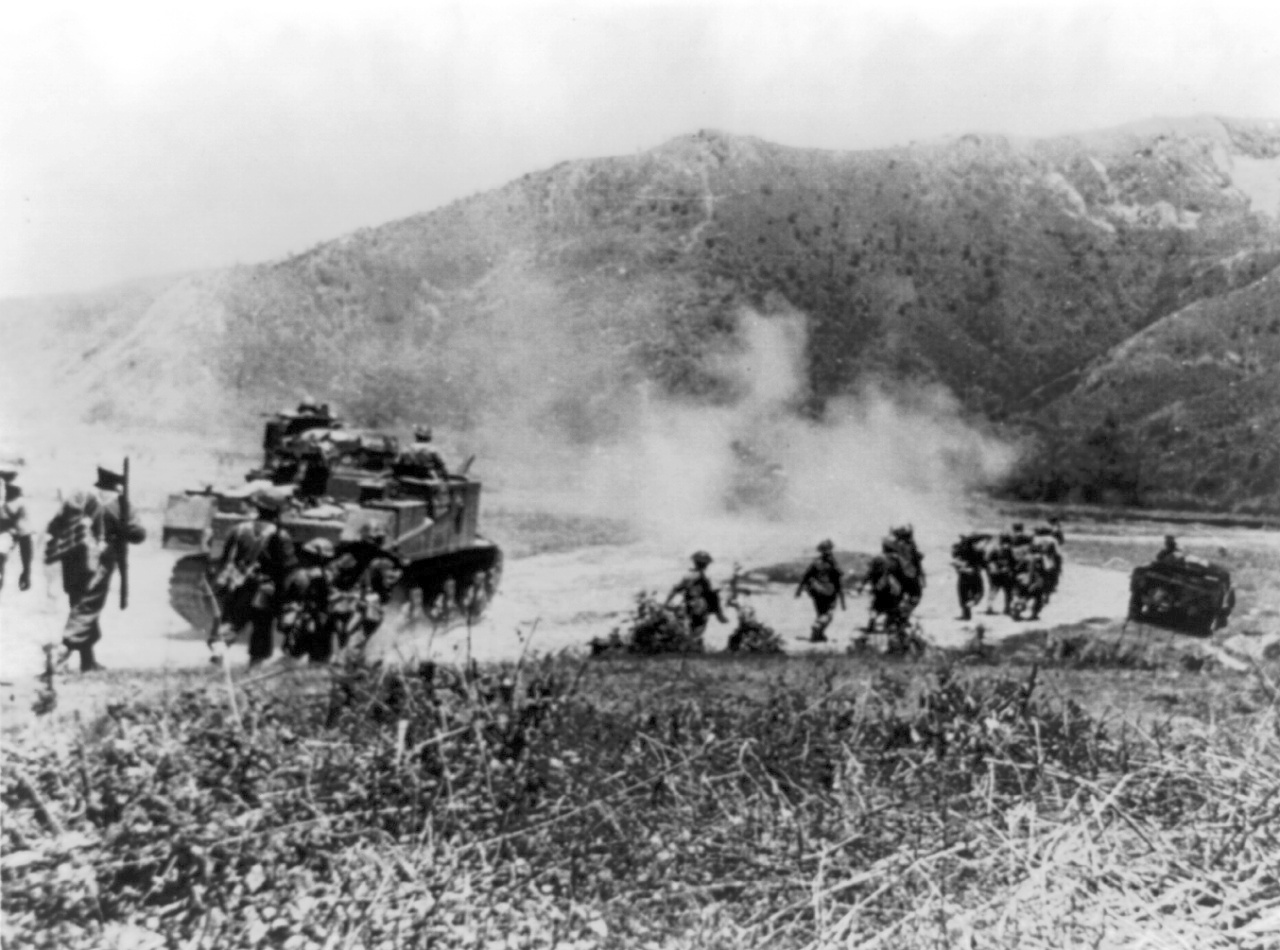
- Gurkhas advancing with Grant tanks to clear the Japanese from Imphal-Kohima road in North Eastern British India
Date	8 March – 3 July 1944 (3 months, 3 weeks and 4 days)
Location	Imphal, Manipur Kingdom, India 24.8167°N 93.9500°E
Result	British victory

Belligerents
United Kingdom; British Raj	Japan; Azad Hind

Commanders and leaders
William Slim; Geoffry Scoones	Masakazu Kawabe; Renya Mutaguchi; Subhas Chandra Bose

Units involved
IV Corps; 17th Infantry Division; 20th Infantry Division; 23rd Infantry Division; 254th Tank Brigade	Fifteenth Army; 15th Infantry Division; * 31st Infantry Division; 33rd Infantry Division; Indian National Army; Subhas Brigade; Bahadur Group

Strength
120,000 troops	85,000 troops 66 tanks

Casualties and losses
12,603 killed and wounded	54,879 killed and wounded

The Battle of Imphal (Meitei: Japan Laan, lit. 'Japanese invasion'), also known as the "Stalingrad of the East" in combination with Kohima, took place in the region around the city of Imphal, the capital of the state of Manipur in Northeast India from March until July 1944. Japanese armies attempted to destroy the Allied forces at Imphal and invade India, but were driven back into Burma with heavy losses. Together with the simultaneous Battle of Kohima on the road by which the encircled Allied forces at Imphal were relieved, the battle was the turning point of the Burma campaign, part of the South-East Asian theatre of World War II. The Japanese defeat at Kohima and Imphal was the largest up until that time, with many of the Japanese deaths resulting from starvation, disease and exhaustion suffered during their retreat.

== Situation ==
=== Background ===
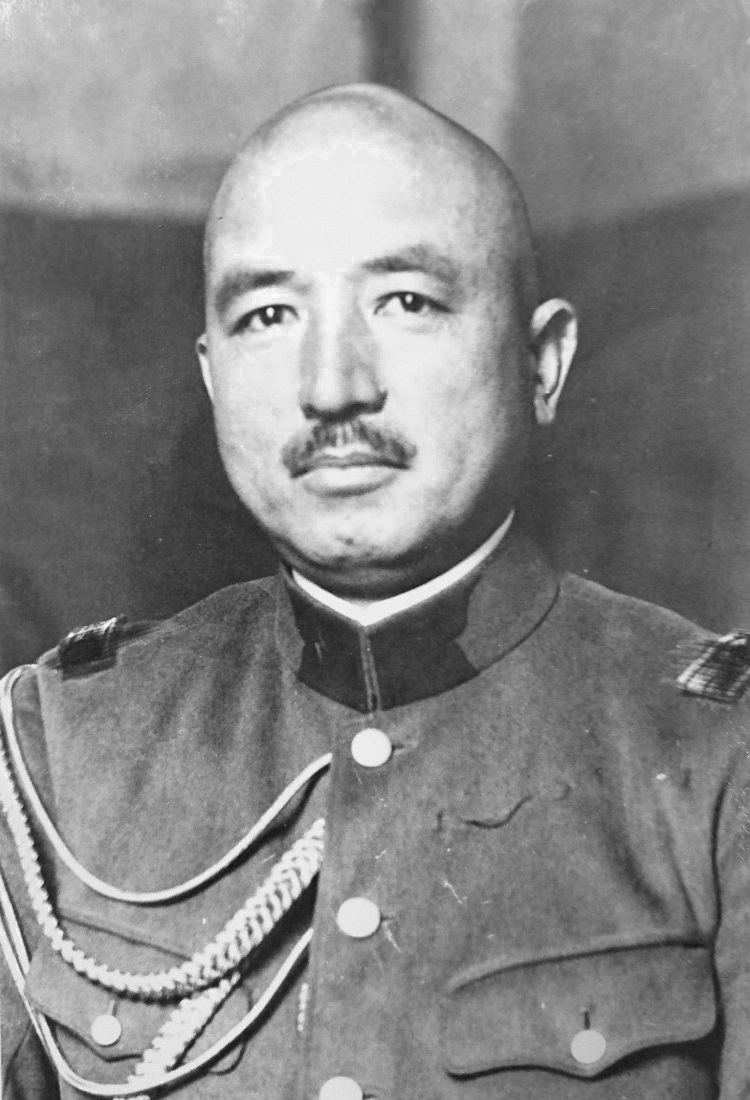
Lt. Gen. Renya Mutaguchi, commanding Fifteenth Army

In late 1941 and early 1942, the Imperial Japanese Army overran Burma, driving the British, Indian and Chinese defenders into India and Yunnan Province in China. They then held their lines against a limited attempt at a counter-offensive from December 1942 to February 1943.

In March 1943, the Japanese command in Burma had been reorganised. A new headquarters, Burma Area Army, was created under Lieutenant-General Masakazu Kawabe. One of its subordinate formations, responsible for the central part of the front facing Imphal and Assam, was the Fifteenth Army. Lieutenant-General Renya Mutaguchi was appointed to command this army in March 1943. From the moment he took command, Mutaguchi forcefully advocated an invasion of India. His motives for doing so are uncertain. He had played a major part in several Japanese victories, ever since the Marco Polo Bridge incident in 1937, and believed it was his destiny to win the decisive battle of the war for Japan. He may also have been goaded by the first Chindit expedition, a raid behind Japanese lines launched by the British under Orde Wingate early in 1943. The Allies had widely publicised the successful aspects of Wingate's expedition while concealing their losses to disease and exhaustion, possibly leading Mutaguchi and some of his staff to underestimate the difficulties they would later face.

At the start of 1944, the war was going against the Japanese on several fronts. They were being driven back in the central and southwest Pacific, and their merchant ships were under attack by Allied submarines and aircraft. In Southeast Asia, they had held their lines over the preceding year, but the Allies were preparing several offensives from India and the Chinese province of Yunnan into Burma. In particular, the town of Imphal in Manipur on the frontier between India and Burma was built up to be a substantial Allied logistic base, with airfields, encampments and supply dumps. Imphal was linked to a railhead at Dimapur in the Brahmaputra Valley by a road which wound for 100 miles (160 km) through the steep and forested Naga Hills.

=== Allied defensive arrangements ===
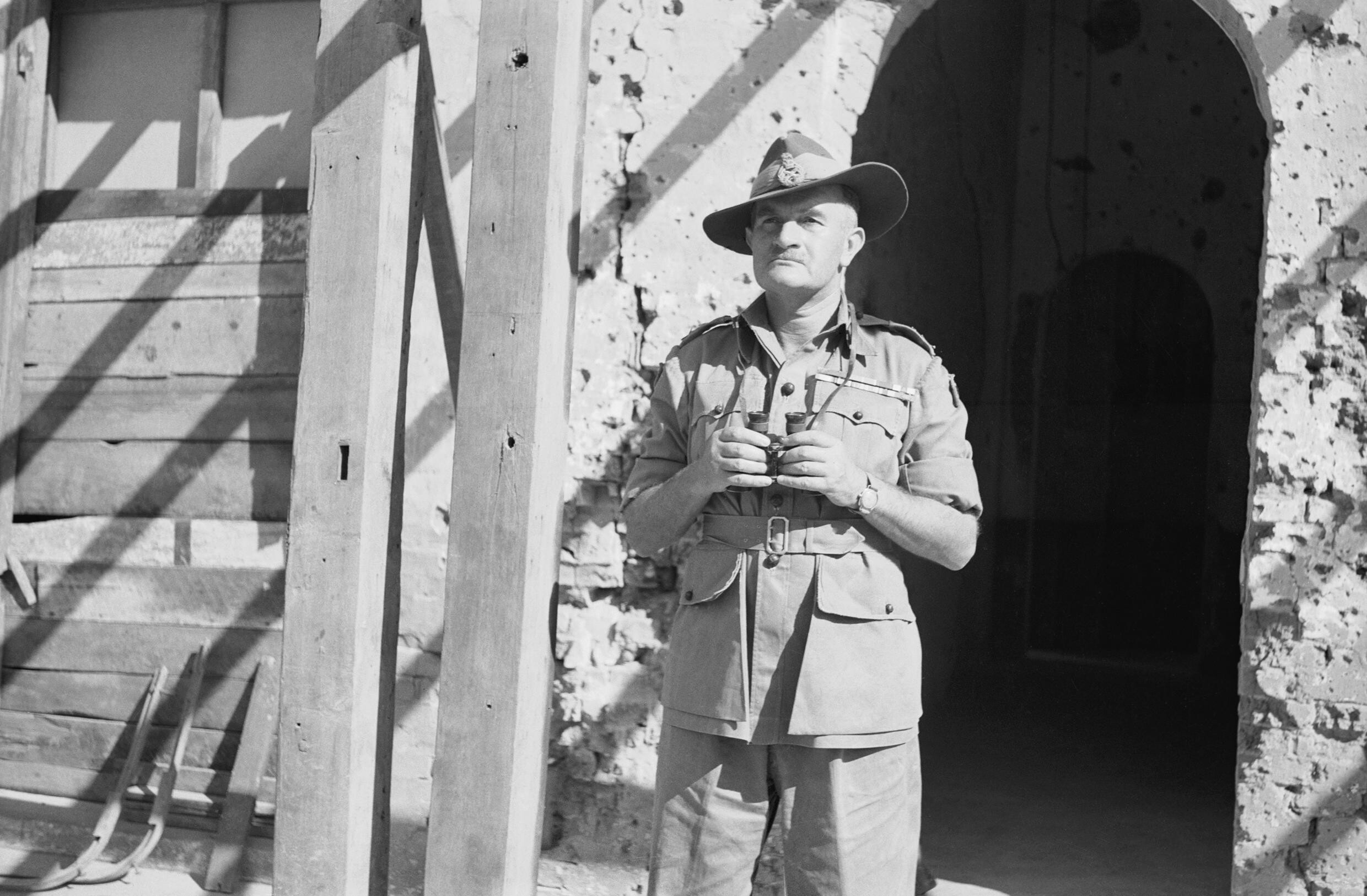
Lieutenant General William Slim, commanding Fourteenth Army

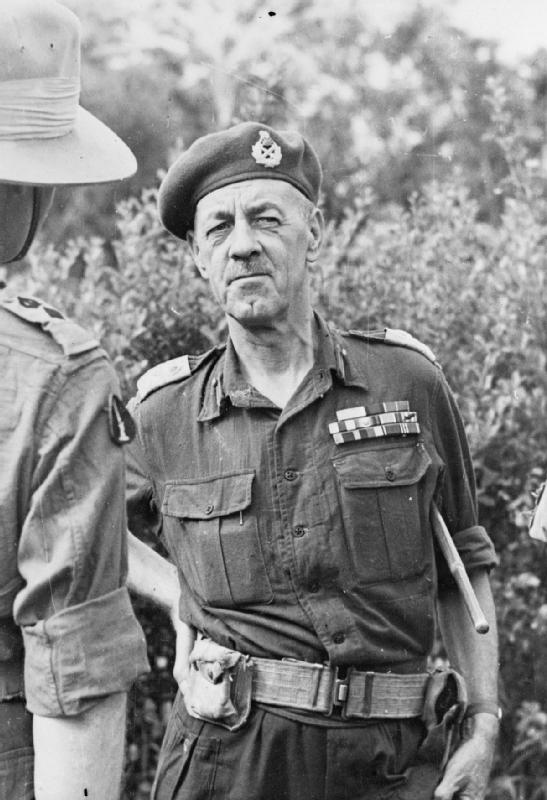
Lieutenant General Geoffry Scoones, commanding IV Corps

Imphal was held by the IV Corps (Lieutenant General Geoffry Scoones) part of the Fourteenth Army (Lieutenant-General William Slim). Because the Allies were planning to take the offensive, the corps' divisions were thrown forward almost to the Chindwin River and widely separated, vulnerable to being isolated and surrounded.

- 20th Indian Infantry Division under Major-General Douglas Gracey occupied Tamu, 110 kilometres (68 mi) south-east of Imphal. The division was untried but well-trained.
- 17th Indian Infantry Division under Major-General 'Punch' Cowan occupied Tiddim, 243 kilometres (151 mi) south of Imphal, at the end of a long and precarious line of communication. The division, which had two brigades only, had been intermittently in action since December 1941.
- 23rd Indian Infantry Division under Major-General Ouvry Roberts was in reserve in and around Imphal. It had served on the Imphal front for two years and was severely understrength as a result of endemic diseases such as malaria and typhus.
- 50th Indian Parachute Brigade under Brigadier Maxwell Hope-Thompson was north of Imphal, conducting advanced jungle training.
- 254th Indian Tank Brigade under Brigadier R. L. Scoones, with one British armoured regiment with M3 Lee tanks and one Indian armoured regiment with Stuart light tanks, was stationed in and around Imphal.

The Indian divisions were composed of British and Indian personnel. In each brigade, there was generally one British, one Gurkha and one Indian battalion, although two brigades (the 37th Brigade in the 23rd Division and 63rd Brigade in the 17th Division) were composed entirely of Gurkha units. Each division was supported by two field artillery regiments (usually British) and one Indian mountain artillery regiment.

=== Japanese offensive planning ===
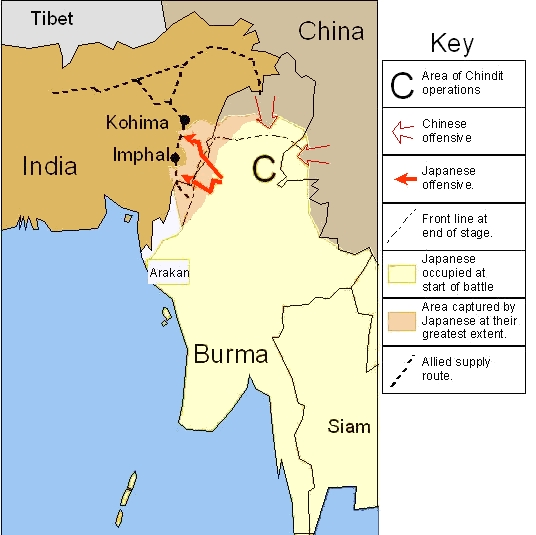
Imphal and Kohima campaign

Mutaguchi intended to exploit his planned capture of Imphal by advancing to the Brahmaputra Valley. This would cut the Allied lines of communication to the front in northern Burma, where the American-led Northern Combat Area Command was attempting to construct the Ledo Road to link India and China by land, and to the airfields supplying the Nationalist Chinese under Chiang Kai-shek via an airlift over "The Hump" (the Himalaya Mountains). Although the staffs at Burma Area Army and at Southern Expeditionary Army Group (the supreme command for the Japanese forces in southeast Asia and the southern Pacific) had reservations over the scale of Mutaguchi's proposed operation, they were eventually won over by his persistent advocacy. Finally, Prime Minister Hideki Tojo and Imperial General Headquarters gave their approval to the plan.

Mutaguchi intended to block the supply lines to the Allied units in their forward positions, to isolate and destroy them, drawing the Allied reserves into the battle and then capture Imphal. His plan was named U-Go, or Operation C. In detail:

- The 33rd Infantry Division under Lieutenant-General Motoso Yanagida would surround and destroy the 17th Indian Division at Tiddim, then attack Imphal from the south.
- Yamamoto Force, formed from units detached from the Japanese 33rd and 15th Divisions under Major-General Tsunoru Yamamoto (commander of 33rd Division's Infantry Group), (Note: A Japanese infantry division had a separate Infantry Brigade, or Infantry Group, headquarters which, as in this case, could control any substantial detachment from the division) would destroy the 20th Indian Division at Tamu, then attack Imphal from the east. The force was supported by the 14th Tank Regiment, equipped with 66 assorted tanks, under Lieutenant Colonel Nobuo Ueda and the 3rd Heavy Artillery Regiment under Lieutenant Colonel Kazuo Mitsui.
- The 15th Infantry Division under Lieutenant-General Masafumi Yamauchi would envelop Imphal from the north. This division was still arriving from road-building duties in Thailand and was understrength at the start of the operation.
- In a separate subsidiary operation, the 31st Infantry Division under Lieutenant-General Kotoku Sato would isolate Imphal by capturing Kohima on the Imphal-Dimapur road, and then advance to Dimapur.

At the insistence of Subhas Chandra Bose, leader of the Azad Hind (a movement which sought to overthrow British rule in India by force, with Japanese assistance), the Indian National Army made a substantial contribution. Originally, the Japanese intended using them only for reconnaissance and propaganda.

- Units of the First Division (initially the Subhas Brigade or 1st Guerrilla Regiment, less a battalion sent to the Arakan) covered the left flank of 33rd Division's advance.
- The 2nd Guerrilla Regiment was attached later in the battle to Yamamoto Force.
- The Special Services Group, redesignated the Bahadur Group, acted as scouts and pathfinders with the advanced Japanese units in the opening stages of the offensive. They were tasked to infiltrate through British lines and encourage units of the British Indian Army to defect.

All of Mutaguchi's divisional commanders disagreed with the plan to some extent. Sato distrusted Mutaguchi's motives, and Yanagida openly derided his abrasive superior as a "blockhead." Yamauchi was already very ill and fatalistic. Their main reservations concerned supply. Mutaguchi had assumed that success would be achieved within three weeks, but adequate supplies after that period could be obtained only if the Japanese captured Allied supply dumps, as the monsoon rains, which usually descended from about the middle of May, would make the supply routes from the Chindwin almost impossible to traverse. Gambles such as Mutaguchi was making had worked in the past, but could no longer be relied upon, given nearly total Allied air superiority in the area and the improvement in morale and training of British and Indian troops. Mutaguchi proposed to use "Genghis Khan" rations, driving herds of buffalo and cattle rounded up throughout northern Burma across the Chindwin as meat rations on the hoof. However, most of these beasts died from lack of forage and their meat rotted many miles from the troops they were intended to supply.

There were other weaknesses in the plan, which were revealed as the campaign progressed. The Japanese assumed that the British would be unable to use tanks on the steep jungle-covered hills around Imphal. For ease of movement and supply, the Japanese left behind most of their field artillery, their chief anti-tank weapon. As a result, their troops would have little protection against tanks.

Based on his experiences in the campaigns in Malaya and Singapore and in the Japanese conquest of Burma in early 1942, Mutaguchi dismissed British and Indian troops as inherently inferior. The troops he had met on those occasions had generally been inadequately trained and led. The Allies, under general William Slim, had by now largely overcome the administrative and organisational problems which had crippled their early efforts in Burma, and their troops were far better trained and motivated.

=== Prelude to the operation ===
In late February, a local Japanese counterattack was launched against Indian XV Corps in Arakan, using much the same tactics as Mutaguchi proposed to use. The engagement became known to the Allies as the Battle of the Admin Box, the "box" being the supply area for the brigades of the 7th Indian Infantry Division. The attack failed as Allied aircraft were able to parachute supplies to the cut-off troops, allowing them to stand firm, while the Japanese who had infiltrated behind them ran out of supplies. From this point onwards, the Allies were to rely increasingly on their transport aircraft. Also, the Japanese unexpectedly encountered tanks, to which the lightly equipped infiltrators had little counter. The planning of U-Go, however, was too far advanced to take account of these developments.

Even as the Japanese prepared to launch their attack, the Allies launched the airborne phase (Operation Thursday) of the second Chindit expedition on 5 March 1944. Japanese officers such as Major-General Noburo Tazoe, commanding the Japanese Army Air Force units in Burma, urged Mutaguchi to divert troops from his offensive to secure the Japanese rear areas against the Chindits. Mutaguchi dismissed these concerns, claiming that in a few weeks he would occupy the air bases from which the Chindits were supplied.

== Opening phases of the battle ==
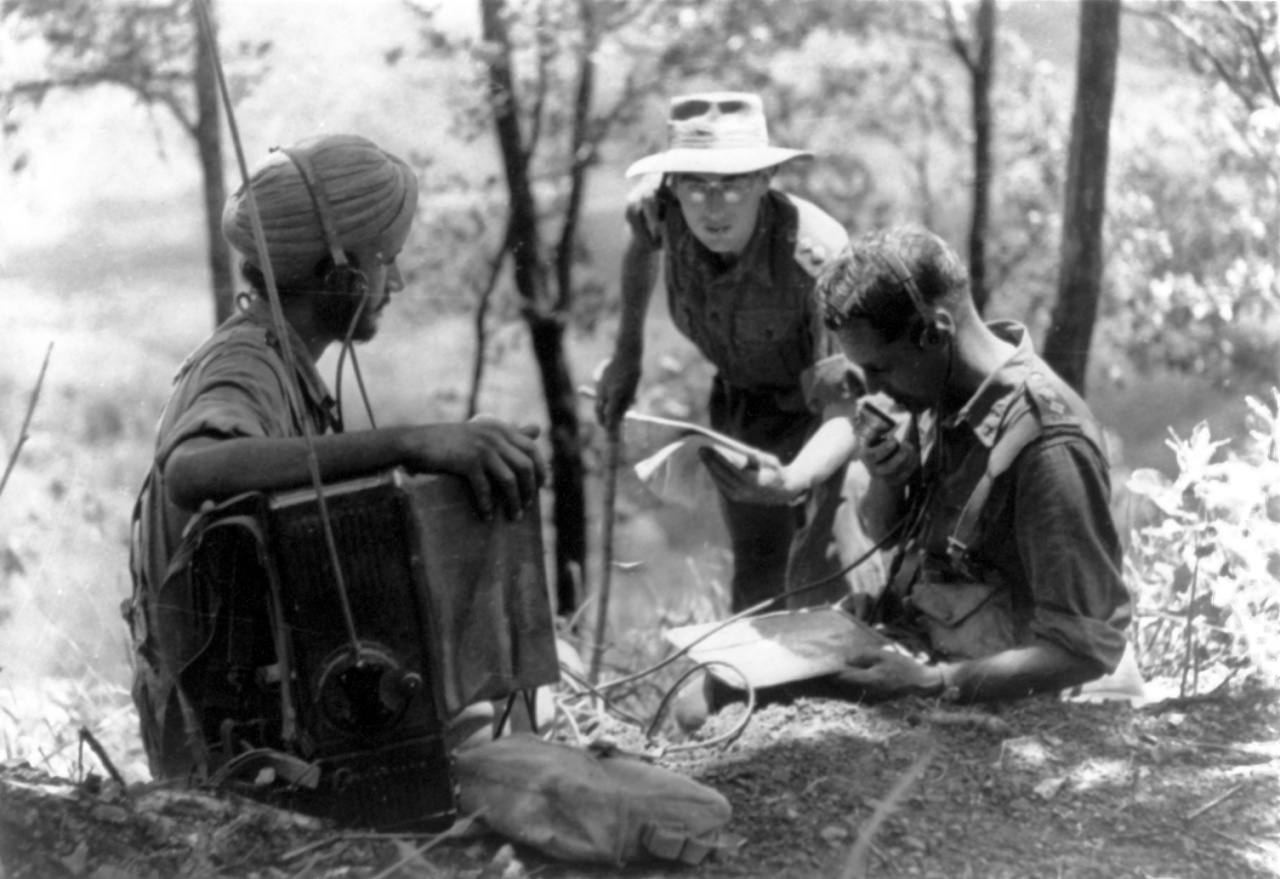
On Imphal front, Sikh signaller operates wireless for British officers, listening to patrols reporting Japanese positions.

When they received intelligence that a major Japanese offensive was impending, Slim and Scoones planned to withdraw their forward divisions into the Imphal plain and force the Japanese to fight at the end of impossibly long and difficult lines of communication. However, they misjudged the date on which the Japanese were to attack, and the strength they would use against some objectives. The Japanese troops began to cross the Chindwin River on 8 March. Scoones gave his forward divisions orders to withdraw to Imphal only on 13 March.

=== Tamu–Shenam ===
The 20th Indian Division held Tamu near the Chindwin, and Moreh a short distance to the north, where a large supply dump had been established. On 20 March, there was a clash between six Lee medium tanks of the 3rd Carabiniers and six Type 95 Ha-Go tanks leading Yamamoto's advance from the south. The lighter Japanese tanks were destroyed. Acting major-general Douglas Gracey was opposed to making any retreat, but on 25 March he was ordered to detach some of his division to provide a reserve for IV Corps. As this left the division too weak to hold Tamu and Moreh, they withdrew to the Shenam Saddle, a complex of hills through which the Imphal-Tamu road ran. The supply dump at Moreh was set ablaze, and 200 cattle there were slaughtered. The division fell back without difficulty, mainly because two of Yamamoto Force's battalions from the Japanese 15th Division (II/51 Regiment and III/60 Regiment) were delayed at Indaw in northern Burma by the Chindits and were unable to intervene.

=== Tiddim–Bishenpur ===
Further south, the 17th Indian Division was cut off by the Japanese 33rd Division. Patrols from the division and from V Force (an irregular force of locally raised levies and guerrillas) warned Cowan of a Japanese force advancing against the rear of the division as early as 8 March, allowing Cowan to regroup the division to protect its rear. On 13 March, the Japanese 215th Regiment attacked a supply dump at milestone 109, twenty miles behind Cowan's leading outposts, while the Japanese 214th Regiment seized Tongzang and a ridge named Tuitum Saddle across the road a few miles behind the 17th Indian Division's main position.

The Indian division began to withdraw on 14 March. At Tuitum Saddle, the Japanese 214th Regiment were unable to dig in properly before they were attacked by the 48th Indian Infantry Brigade on 15 March. The Japanese suffered heavy casualties and were forced away from the road. Further north, the Japanese captured the depot at Milestone 109 on 18 March, but Indian troops recovered it on 25 March. Cowan had taken steps to secure the most vulnerable point in the rear of his division, the bridge over the Manipur River. The division's rearguard crossed safely on 26 March, demolishing the bridge behind them. The division removed most of the vehicles, food and ammunition from the depot at Milestone 109 before resuming their retreat.

Both the Japanese and the Indian division had suffered heavy casualties. Yanagida, the Japanese 33rd Division's commander, was already pessimistic, and was apparently unnerved by a garbled radio message which suggested that one of his regiments had been destroyed at Tongzang. He therefore did not press the pursuit against the 17th Division, and advanced cautiously in spite of reprimands from Mutaguchi.

Scoones had nevertheless been forced to send the bulk of his only reserve, the 23rd Indian Infantry Division, to the aid of the 17th Division. The two divisions, supplied by parachute drops from Allied aircraft, made their way back to the Imphal plain, which they reached on 4 April.

=== Sangshak–Litan ===
Meanwhile, Imphal had been left vulnerable to the Japanese 15th Division. The only force left covering the northern approaches to the base, the Indian 50th Parachute Brigade, was roughly handled in the Battle of Sangshak by a regiment from the Japanese 31st Division on its way to Kohima. The Japanese 60th Regiment cut the main road a few miles north of Imphal on 28 March, while the 51st Regiment advanced on Imphal from the north-east, down the valley of the Iril River and the road from Litan, 23 miles (37 km) north-east of Imphal.

However, the earlier diversionary attack launched by Japanese 55th Division in Arakan had already failed. Admiral Louis Mountbatten, the commander in chief of the Allied South East Asia Command, had taken steps to secure aircraft normally assigned to the "Hump". Slim was able to use these to move the battle-hardened 5th Indian Infantry Division, including all its artillery and first-line transport (jeeps and mules), by air from Arakan to the Central Front. The move was completed in only eleven days. One brigade and a mountain artillery regiment went to Dimapur in the Brahmaputra valley, but the other two brigades, the field artillery and the divisional HQ went to Imphal. The leading troops of the division were in action north and east of Imphal on 3 April.

=== Chin Hills ===
On the Japanese left flank, the INA's Subhas Brigade, led by Shah Nawaz Khan, reached the edge of the Chin Hills below Tiddim and Fort White at the end of March. From this position, the 2nd Battalion sent companies to relieve Japanese forces at Falam and to Hakha, from where in turn Khan's forces sent out patrols and laid ambushes for the Chin guerrillas under the command of a British officer, Lieutenant-Colonel Oates, taking a number of prisoners. In the middle of May, a force under Khan's Adjutant, Mahboob "Boobie" Ahmed, attacked and captured the hilltop fortress of Klang Klang. The 3rd Battalion meanwhile moved to Fort White-Tongzang area in premature anticipation of the destruction of Major General Frank Messervy's 7th Indian Infantry Division in the Arakan, which would allow it to receive volunteers.

During the early part of the offensive, the Bahadur Group of the INA apparently achieved some success in inducing British Indian soldiers to desert.

== Stalemate ==
From the beginning of April, the Japanese attacked the Imphal Plain from several directions:

=== Bishenpur ===
The Japanese 33rd Division attacked from the south at Bishenpur, where they cut a secondary track from Silchar into the plain. A commando raid destroyed a suspension bridge, making the Silchar track unusable. The 17th and 23rd Indian Divisions were regrouping after their retreat, and Bishenpur was only held by the 32nd Indian Infantry Brigade (detached from 20th Division). The Japanese advanced through the hills to the west of Bishenpur, almost isolating the British in the village, but suffered severely from British artillery fire. Their leading troops were halted by lack of supply only 10 miles (16 km) from Imphal. Other Japanese advancing directly up the Tiddim-Imphal road were halted in Potsangbam 2 miles (3.2 km) south of Bishenpur, as troops of 17th Indian Division rejoined the battle.

Yanagida, the Japanese division's commander, had already infuriated Mutaguchi by his caution. He was finally relieved of command at the end of the month.

=== Shenam–Palel ===
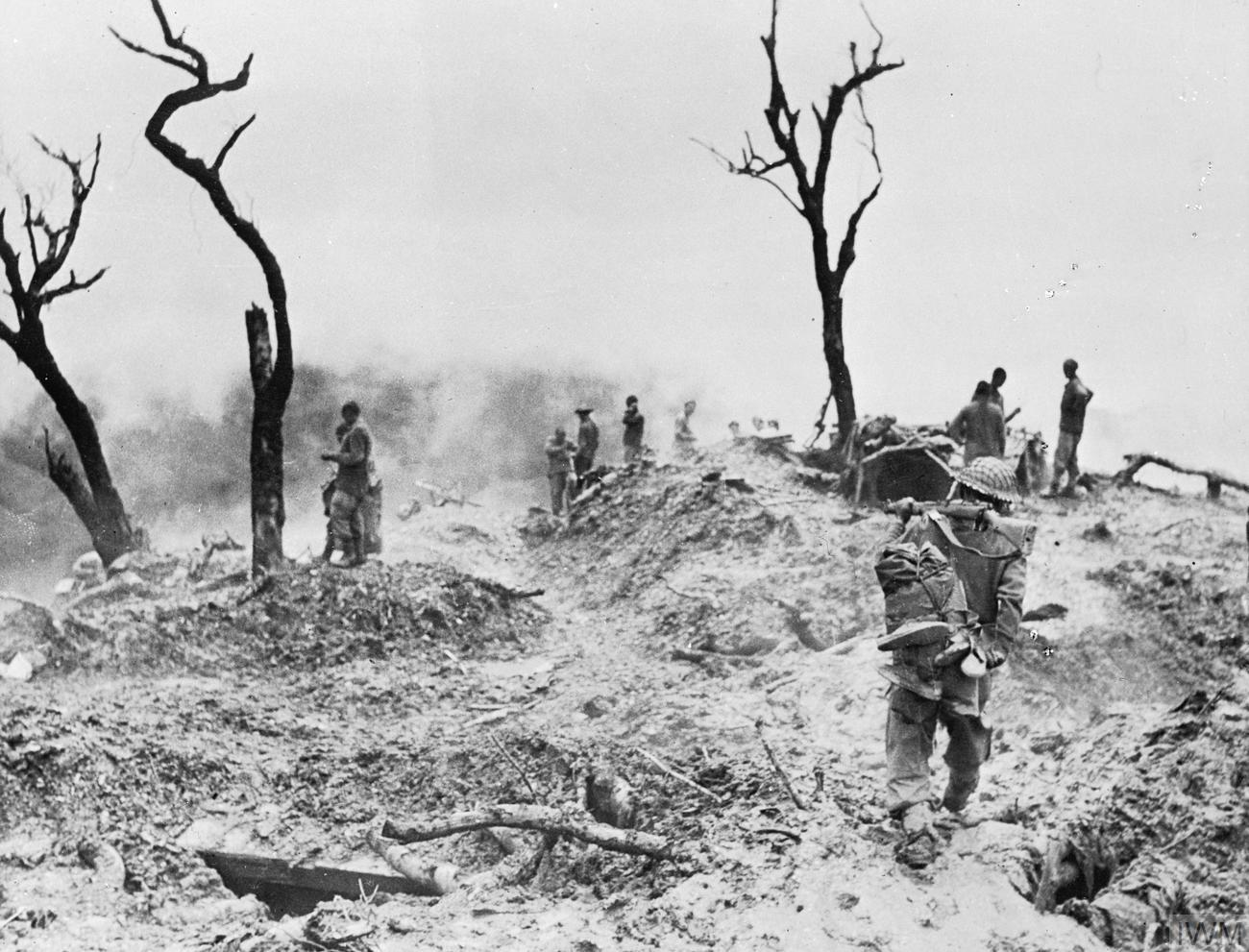
Scraggy Hill (known to the Japanese as Ito Hill) on the Shenam Pass, captured by the 4/10th Gurkhas

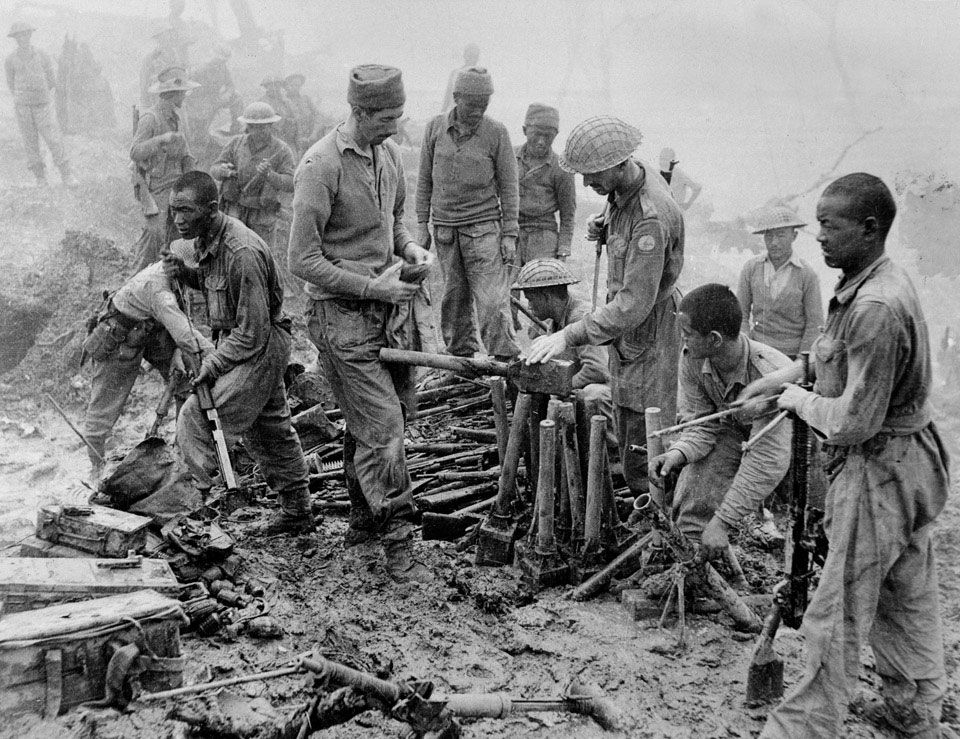
British and Gurkha troops inspecting captured Japanese ordnance during the battle

Yamamoto Force attacked the Shenam Saddle, defended by the main body of the Indian 20th Division, on the main road from Tamu into Imphal. This was the only metalled road the Japanese could use, and it was vital for them to break through to allow Yamamoto's tanks and heavy artillery to attack the main defences around Imphal itself. Only a few miles north of the saddle was Palel airfield, one of the only two all-weather airfields in the plain, and vital to the defenders.

A Japanese attack up the road on 4 April was disjointed; the infantry were not ready to take part and twelve Japanese tanks were caught exposed on the road by British anti-tank guns. From 8 to 22 April, there was heavy fighting for five peaks which commanded the road east of the Saddle. The Japanese captured a number of them, but Indian and British counter-attacks regained some of those initially lost. Casualties were heavy on both sides.

Having failed to break through using the road, Yamamoto sent some troops through the rough terrain to the north of the Saddle to raid Palel airfield. The INA's Gandhi Brigade or 2nd Guerrilla Regiment, of two battalions led by Inayat Kiyani, took part in this attack. On 28 April, they attacked Palel. They tried to induce some Indian defenders to surrender, but the defenders rallied after initial hesitation. Another INA detachment carried out demolitions around Palel, but withdrew after they failed to rendezvous with Japanese units. The Gandhi Brigade was short of rations, having brought forward only one day's supplies, and also suffered 250 casualties to shellfire after they pulled back from Palel.

=== Kanglatongbi–Nungshigum ===
The Japanese 15th Division encircled Imphal from the north. Its 60th Regiment captured a British supply dump at Kanglatongbi on the main Imphal-Dimapur road a few miles north of Imphal, but the depot had been emptied of food and ammunition. A battalion of the Japanese 51st Regiment (which was commanded by Colonel Kimio Omoto) seized the vital Nungshigum Ridge, which overlooked the main airstrip at Imphal. This was a major threat to IV Corps and on 13 April the 5th Indian Division counter-attacked, supported by air strikes, massed artillery and the M3 Lee tanks of B Squadron of the 3rd Carabiniers. The Japanese had expected that the slopes were too steep for tanks to climb, and indeed Lee tanks had never been tried before on such gradients in action. The Japanese regiment had very few effective anti-tank weapons, and their troops were driven from the ridge with heavy casualties. The attackers also lost heavily; every officer of the Carabiniers and the attacking infantry (1st Battalion, 17th Dogra Regiment) was killed or wounded.

== Allied counter-attacks ==
=== North ===
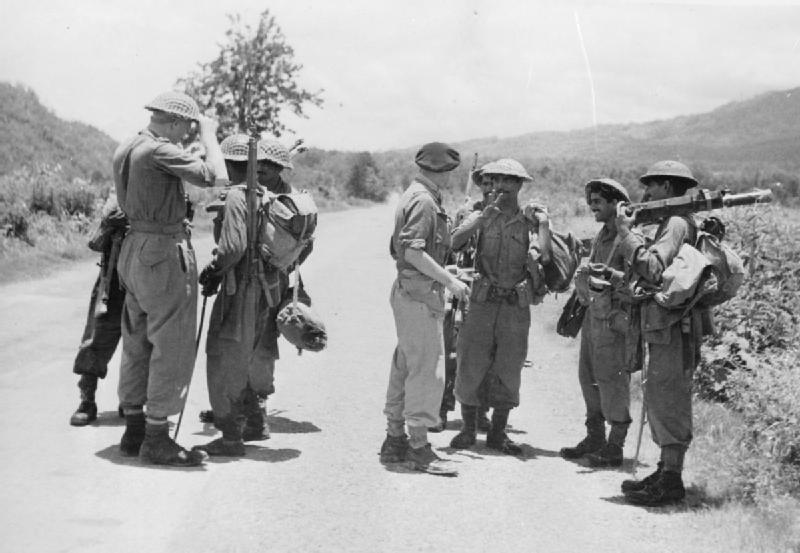
Troops of Indian 5th Division and British 2nd Division meet at Milestone 109, to raise the siege of Imphal

By 1 May, all Japanese attacks had come to a halt. Slim and Scoones began a counter-offensive against the Japanese 15th Division. This division was the weakest of the Japanese formations, and if it was defeated, the siege would be broken (once Kohima was recaptured). The progress of the counter-attack was slow. The monsoon had broken, making movement very difficult. Also, IV Corps was suffering some shortages. Although rations and reinforcements were delivered to Imphal by air, artillery ammunition had to be conserved.

The 5th Indian Division (joined by the 89th Indian Infantry Brigade which was flown in to replace the brigade sent to Kohima) and 23rd Indian Division (later replaced by the 20th Division) tried capturing the steep ridges, such as the Mapao Spur, held by the Japanese, but found these to be almost impregnable. Allied artillery was usually unable to hit Japanese positions on the reverse slopes, and the troops often stormed the summits of the ridges, only to be driven off by mortar fire and grenades from the reverse slope positions. IV Corps regrouped. The 23rd Indian Division took over the defence of the Shenam Saddle, while from the end of May, 5th Division concentrated on driving north from Sengmai up the main road through Kanglatongi, while the 20th Indian Division advanced along the tracks and the Iril River toward Litan and Ukhrul, threatening the Japanese 15th Division's lines of communication.

By this time, the Japanese were at the end of their endurance. Neither the 31st Division which was fighting at Kohima nor the 15th Division had received adequate supplies since the offensive began, and their troops were starving. Lieutenant General Sato, the commander of the Japanese 31st Division, ordered a retreat at the end of May, so that his division could find food. This allowed Indian XXXIII Corps to drive the Japanese from Kohima, and advance south.

The troops of Japanese 15th Division were forced to abandon their defensive positions to scavenge for supplies in local villages or on the Japanese lines of communication. Mutaguchi dismissed the mortally ill Yamauchi (replacing him with Lieutenant General Uichi Shibata) but this did not change matters. After driving rearguards from the Miyazaki Group (an independent detachment from the 31st Division) and the Japanese 60th Regiment from their delaying positions on the Dimapur-Imphal road, the leading troops of IV Corps and XXXIII Corps met at Milestone 109, 10 miles (16 km) north of Imphal, on 22 June, and the siege of Imphal was raised.

=== South ===
South of Imphal, 17th Indian Division had moved back into the line, facing the Japanese 33rd Division. During the first half of May, there were several Japanese air attacks on Bishenpur, and heavy fighting for the village of Potsangbam 2 miles (3.2 km) to the south, in which the British lost 12 tanks. The surviving crews of the 3rd Carabiniers were later flown out of Imphal to be reconstituted in India.

Major General Cowan planned to break the deadlock on this front by sending the 48th Indian Infantry Brigade on a wide left hook into the Japanese division's rear while 63rd Indian Infantry Brigade attacked them in front. The Japanese division's temporary commander (its chief of staff, Major General Tetsujiro Tanaka) planned at the same time to infiltrate through Indian 17th Division's front to seize vital objectives in the middle of the Indian positions. Both moves were launched almost simultaneously.

The Gurkhas of 48th Indian Brigade cut the road behind the Japanese on 18 May, but 63rd Indian Brigade were unable to break through to them, and 48th Brigade was forced to fight its way through the Japanese positions to rejoin the division, with heavy losses. Meanwhile, some of Tanaka's troops (the 214th Regiment) captured hills close to 17th Division's headquarters on 20 May. Because of the incursion into their own rear, the Japanese were unable to reinforce their forward troops, and over the following week the isolated Japanese were driven from their positions in the middle of the Indian division, many parties being wiped out.

A new forceful commander, Lieutenant General Nobuo Tanaka, took command of the 33rd Division on 22 May, and ordered repeated attacks which reduced many of his division's battalions to mere handfuls of men. In June, he received reinforcements (a regiment from the Japanese 53rd Division, and a detachment from the 14th Tank Regiment) and used them to launch another attack. After initial success, the fresh regiment suffered heavy casualties from shellfire. By the end of June, the 33rd Division had suffered so many casualties that they could make no further effort.

Yamamoto Force had also suffered heavy casualties, but before withdrawing, they launched two modest raids on Palel Airfield in the first week of July, destroying several parked aircraft.

=== INA operations ===
Towards the end of May, the INA's 1st and 2nd Guerrilla Regiments (the latter commanded by Malik Munawar Khan Awan) had been redirected to Kohima. They moved north across the Japanese rear but by the time they reached Ukhrul, the Japanese had already begun to withdraw. They decided to attack Imphal instead. At Imphal, both units suffered some desertions, but not on the scale that the Commonwealth forces expected.

== End of the battle ==
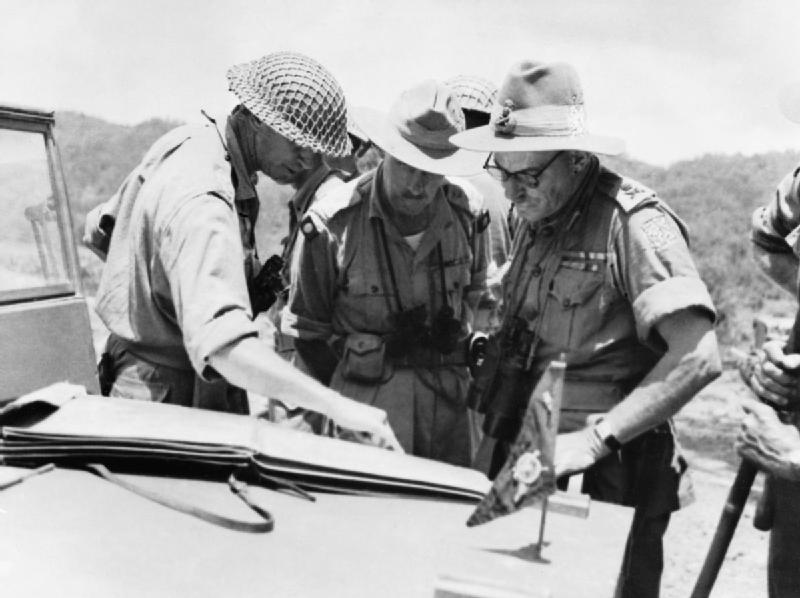
General Montagu Stopford (right) confers with other British officers after the opening of the Imphal-Kohima road.

The Japanese had realised that the operation ought to be broken off as early as May. Lieutenant General Hikosaburo Hata, the Vice-Chief of the General Staff, had made a tour of inspection of Southern Army's headquarters in late April. When he returned to Tokyo, he reported pessimistically on the outcome of the operation at a large staff meeting to Prime Minister Hideki Tojo but Tojo dismissed his concerns as their source was a junior staff officer (Major Masaru Ushiro, at Burma Area Army HQ). Messages were sent from Imperial Headquarters, urging that the operation was to be fought to the end.

Lieutenant General Kawabe travelled north from Rangoon to see the situation for himself on 25 May. Several officers whom he interviewed expressed confidence in success if reinforcements could be provided, but actually concealed their losses and the seriousness of the situation. At a meeting between Mutaguchi and Kawabe on 6 June, both used haragei, an unspoken form of communication using gesture, expression and tone of voice, to convey their conviction that success was impossible, but neither of them wished to bear the responsibility of ordering a retreat. Kawabe subsequently became ill with dysentery and perhaps physically unfit for duty. He nevertheless ordered repeated attacks, stating later that Bose was the key to Japan's and India's future.

Mutaguchi ordered the Japanese 31st Division, which had retreated from Kohima when threatened with starvation, to join the 15th Division in a renewed attack on Imphal from the north. Neither division obeyed the order, being in no condition to comply. When he realised that none of his formations were obeying his orders to attack, Mutaguchi finally ordered the offensive to be broken off on 3 July. The Japanese, reduced in many cases to a rabble, fell back to the Chindwin, abandoning their artillery, transport, and many soldiers too badly wounded or sick to walk. The Allies recovered Tamu at the end of July. It was found to contain 550 unburied Japanese corpses, with over 100 more severely-wounded Japanese soldiers slowly dying amongst them.

== Casualties ==
The Japanese defeat at Kohima and Imphal was the largest defeat suffered by their army up until that time. They had suffered 54,879 casualties, including 13,376 dead (plus 920 casualties in the preliminary battles in Assam). Most of these losses were the result of starvation, disease and exhaustion.

The Allies suffered 12,603 casualties.

== Aftermath ==
The Japanese had also lost almost every one of the 12,000 pack horses and mules in their transport units and the 30,000 cattle used either as beasts of burden or as rations, and many trucks and other vehicles. The loss of pack animals was to cripple several of their divisions during the following year. Mutaguchi had sacked all of his divisions' commanders during the battle. Both he and Kawabe were themselves subsequently relieved of command.

In December, Slim and three of his corps commanders (Scoones, Christison and Stopford) were knighted by the viceroy Lord Wavell, at a ceremony at Imphal in front of Scottish, Gurkha and Punjab regiments. Slim was created KCB, the others were made KBEs.

== Air operations at Imphal ==
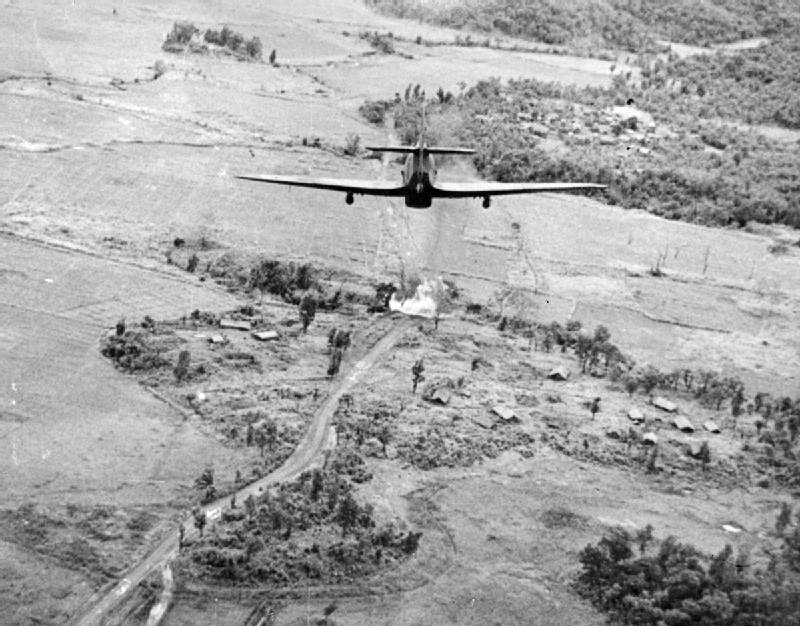
A Hawker Hurricane Mark IV attacks a Japanese position on the Tiddim Road.

By mid-1944, the Allied air forces enjoyed undisputed air supremacy over Burma. The last major effort by the Japanese Army Air Force had been over the Arakan in February and March, when they had suffered severe losses. During the Imphal and Kohima battles, they were able to make barely half a dozen significant raids.

IV Corps enjoyed close air support from fighter-bombers and dive bombers of 221 Group of the RAF. Allied fighter bombers and medium bombers shot up and bombed enemy concentrations, supply dumps, transport, roads and bridges all the way to the Chindwin river. The monsoon, which occurred every year from May to September, in no way diminished their activity. The RAF Third Tactical Air Force flew 24,000 sorties during the worst four months of the monsoon, nearly six times the previous year's record.

The most important contribution to the Allied victory was made by British and American transport aircraft. The Allies could fly men, equipment and supplies into the airstrips at Imphal (and Pallel also, until the onset of the monsoon rains), so, although cut off by land, the town had a lifeline. By the end of the battle, the Allied air forces had flown 19,000 tons of supplies and 12,000 men into Kohima and Imphal, and flown out 13,000 casualties and 43,000 non-combatants. They delivered over a million gallons of fuel, over a thousand bags of mail and 40 million cigarettes. Several thousand mules were used to supply outlying outposts, for example, 17th Indian Division on the Bishenpur trail, so animal fodder was also flown in during the siege. Allied aircraft parachuted ammunition, rations and drinking water to surrounded units.

At the start of the battle, South East Asia Command had 76 transport aircraft (mainly C-47 Skytrain) available, but many others were dedicated to supplying the Nationalist Chinese under Chiang Kai-Shek, or to establishing USAAF bomber bases in China, via "the Hump". Not even Admiral Louis Mountbatten, the Commander-in-Chief, had the authority to commandeer any of these aircraft, but at the crisis of the battle in the middle of March he nevertheless did so, acquiring 20 C-46 Commando aircraft (equivalent to another 30 C-47s). He was supported by American officers at SEAC and the American China-Burma-India Theater headquarters.

== War cemetery ==
After the war, the Commonwealth War Graves Commission set up Imphal War Cemetery and Kohima War Cemetery to commemorate the British and the Indian soldiers who died during the Second World War.

== See also ==
- Imphal Peace Museum
- India in World War II
- Rüzazho
- Rao Abdul Hafiz VC

== Notes ==
Footnotes

Citations

== Bibliography ==
- Allen, Louis (1984). Burma: The Longest War. Dent Publishing. ISBN 0-460-02474-4.
- Balfour Oatts, Lewis (1962). The Jungle In Arms. William Kimber & Co. Ltd. ISBN 9780450026300.
- Brett-James, Antony (2014) [1951]. Ball of Fire: The Fifth Indian Division in the Second World War. Naval & Military Press. ISBN 9781783310968.
- Bond, Brian; Tachikawa, Kyoichi (2004). British and Japanese Military Leadership in the Far Eastern War, 1941–1945. Routledge. ISBN 9780714685557.
- Bayly, Christopher; Harper, Tim (2004). Forgotten Armies: Britain's Asian Empire and the War with Japan. Penguin. ISBN 0-140-29331-0.
- Callahan, Raymond A (2017). Triumph at Imphal-Kohima: How the Indian Army Finally Stopped the Japanese Juggernaut. ISBN 9780700624270.
- Cawthorne, Nigel (2005). History's Greatest Battles: Masterstrokes of War. Arcturus Publishing. ISBN 9781848584372.
- Clodfelter, Micheal (2017). Warfare and Armed Conflicts: A Statistical Encyclopedia of Casualty and Other Figures, 1492–2015 (4th ed.). McFarland & Company. ISBN 978-0786474707.
- Davis, Paul K. (2003) [2001]. Besieged: 100 Great Sieges From Jericho to Sarajevo. Oxford University Press. ISBN 1-57607-195-2.
- Fay, Peter W. (1993). The Forgotten Army: India's Armed Struggle for Independence, 1942–1945. Ann Arbor: University of Michigan Press. ISBN 0-472-08342-2.
- Franks, Norman (1985). Air Battle of Imphal. London: William Kimber & Co. ISBN 978-0718305529.
- Kangjam, Yaiphaba Meetei (2019). Forgotten Voices of the Japan Laan: The Battle of Imphal and the Second World War in Manipur. INTACH. ISBN 978-81-7305-618-5.
- Latimer, Jon (2004). Burma: The Forgotten War. London: John Murray. ISBN 978-0-7195-6576-2.
- Valour Enshrined: A History of the Maratha Light Infantry 1768–1947. Orient Longman. 1960.
- McLynn, Frank (2011). The Burma Campaign: Disaster Into Triumph 1942–45. Yale University Press. ISBN 978-0-300-17162-4.
- Richard Collier; Douglas Botting; Rafael Steinberg; Barrie Pitt; Leonard Mosley; Martin Blumenson; Don Moser; Robert Wernick; Ronald H Bailey; Arthur Zic; Nicholas Bethell; Robert Wallace; Robert T Elson (1978). World War II: China-Burma-India. Time-Life Books. OCLC 929391987.
- Ritter, Jonathan Templin (2017). Stillwell and Mountbatten in Burma: Allies at War, 1943–1944. University of North Texas Press. ISBN 978-1-57441-674-9.
- Rooney, David (1992). Burma Victory: Imphal and Kohima, March 1944 to May 1945. London: Cassell. ISBN 0-304-35457-0.
- Slim, William (1956). Defeat into Victory. London: Cassell. ISBN 978-0-330-50997-8.
