= Thoubal River =

River in Manipur, India

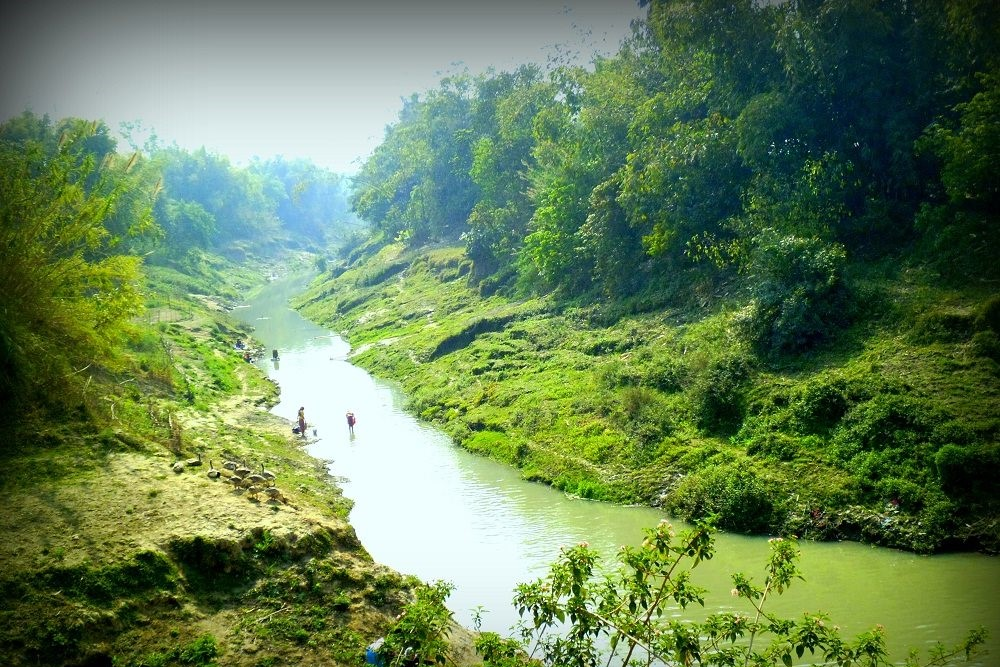

Location
- Country: India
- State: Manipur

Physical characteristics
- Source: Huining Hills of Talui, Ukhrul District
  - coordinates: 25.15°N 94.30°E
  - elevation: 1240 m
- Mouth
  - coordinates: 24°38′23″N 93°55′07″E
- Discharge
  - location: Imphal River

Basin features
- River system: Manipur River

Thoubal River is a river that flows in Manipur from the hills of Ukhrul District and merges into the Imphal River at Bitra Urokhong.

The Mapithel Dam is constructed on the river at Maphou village of Kangpokpi District. The river flows from Ukhrul to Yairipok in a southward direction. Then, the river flows through the center of Thoubal town from east to west.
