= Magic Roundabout =

Magic Roundabout may refer to:

- The Magic Roundabout, a 1963 children's television series (originally Le Manège Enchanté)
- The Magic Roundabout (film), a 2005 animated film, based on the series
- The Magic Roundabout, a 1979 project to build a full scale Millennium Falcon in Pembroke, Wales, for a Star Wars film
- A special traffic roundabout in England with a complex layout, nicknamed after the above series, also known as a ring junction:
  - Magic Roundabout (Colchester)
  - Magic Roundabout (Hemel Hempstead)
  - Magic Roundabout (High Wycombe)
  - Magic Roundabout (Swindon)
- "Magic Roundabout", a song on IQ's 1985 album The Wake
- "Magic Roundabout", a 1975 comedy routine by Jasper Carrott
