= Chit Ko Ko =

Myanmar botanist (1925–2009)

U Chit Ko Ko
- Born: 1917; Minbu, Myanmar
- Died: 2008; Yangon, Myanmar
- Education: Yangon University
- Scientific career
- Fields: Botany, Systematics, Forestry
- Academic advisors: Dwan Mohindar Nath Nair, Ko Ko Lay, J. Lynsdale

U Chit Ko Ko (Burmese: ချစ်ကိုကို, IPA: [tɕʰɪʔ kò kò]; 1917–2008) was a Myanmar botanist. He produced a number of papers into botanical research he conducted in Myanmar, Laos and Cambodia. His 1961 paper on List of Trees and Shrubs, co-written with H. G Hundley, identified some 7,000 angiosperms in Myanmar. In addition to his prominent reputation in Myanmar, U Chit Ko Ko is remembered internationally for his work with the famed plantsman and explorer Frank Kingdon-Ward whom he accompanied on his last two expeditions in Myanmar.

== Early life ==
U Chit Ko Ko was the only son of U Ba Gyaw and Daw Tin Tin, born in Magyeechaung Village of Minbu Township in 1917. He was schooled in the village monastery, transferring to the Yangon Bigandet Missionary School at the age of nine. It was here he learned the English language. His primary schooling was finished at the Burmese Methodist School in Yegyaw where he studied until passing the tenth standard, also known as the Anglo-Vernacular High School, in 1939.

== WWII, 1939-1945 ==
Immediately after finishing his primary schooling, U Chit Ko Ko was appointed in the Dhobammar Asi-ayone. He was politically active, serving as the secretary of the Student Association and was active in the Bo Aung Gyaw National Students Strike and the Secretariat Incident.

When World War II broke out, he returned to Minbu and became involved in the Anti-Fascist Movement. He fled Minbu upon learning that the Japanese Kempetai intended to arrest him. Upon meeting U Kyaw Nyein he was told to report to Pa-O U Hla Pe, the Minister of Forests at the time. He was appointed Deputy Forest Ranger in the Myanmar Forest Service. After his training he was sent to the Forest School in Tharyarwady which had opened during the Japanese occupation of Myanmar during 1943 and 1944.

== After WWII, 1945-1952 ==
After WWII ended, U Chit Ko Ko left the Forest Service to work in the Accountant General's Office. However, U Aung Din, a silviculturist with the Forest Department, persuaded him to return. In 1949 he was appointed as a Forester. U Aung Din also arranged for him to study Systematic Botany and Taxonomy in the Biology Department of Yangon University between 1950. Here he studied under Dwan Mohindar Nath Nair, Ko Ko Lay, and J. Lynsdale.

After completing his students, U Chit Ko Ko was appointed temporary Curator of the Yangon Forestry Herbarium. He was then promoted to Deputy Forest Ranger and again to Curator of the Yangon Forestry Herbarium in 1952.

== Expeditions with Frank Kingdon-Ward, 1953-1956 ==
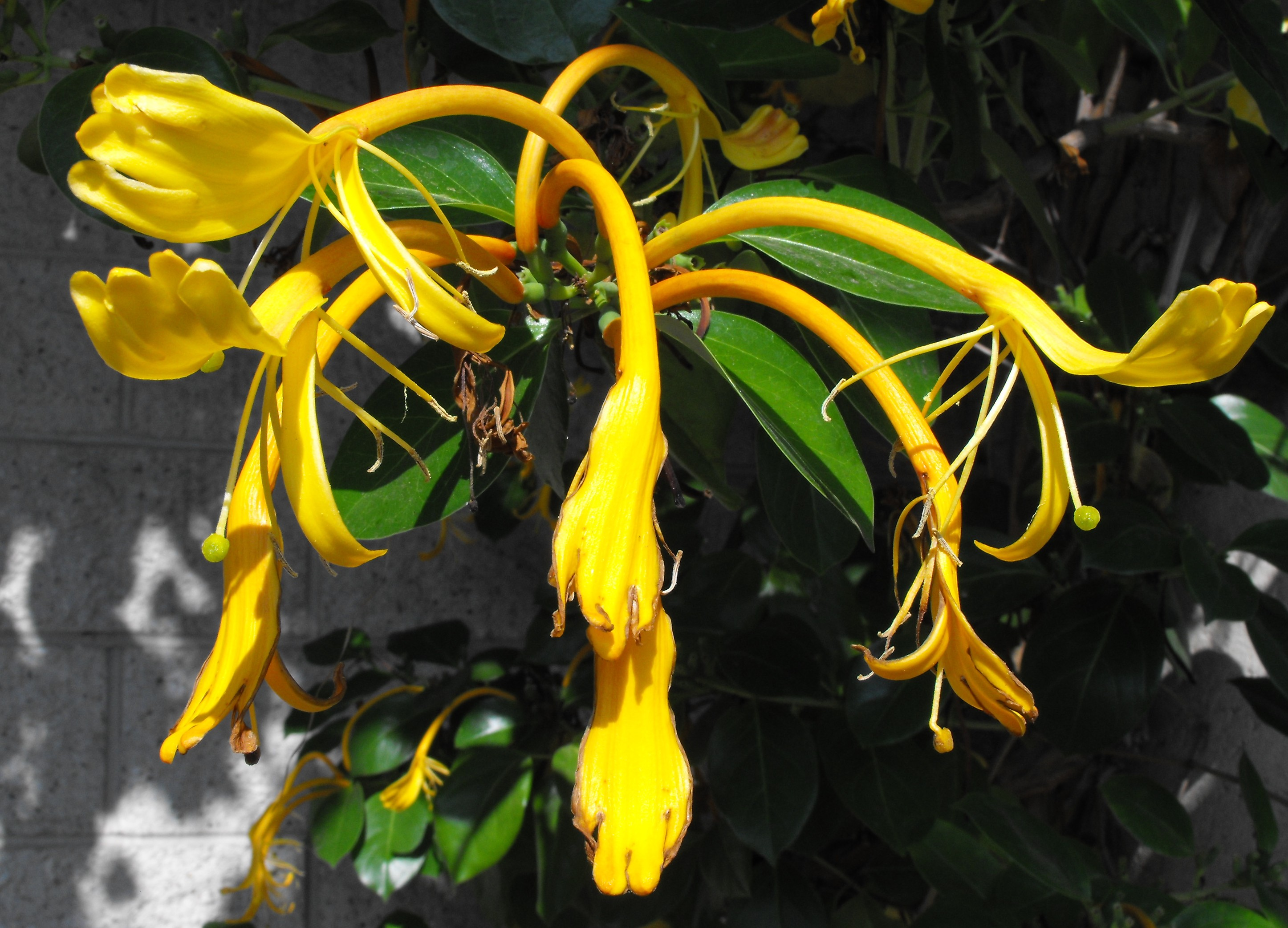
Lonicera hildebrandiana

In 1953, U Chit Ko Ko and senior colleague U Tha Hla met famed English plant hunter and explorer Frank Kingdon-Ward and his wife Jean Kingdon-Ward and conducted further research into plants in Myanmar. This was the first time Kingdon-Ward had returned to the country since before World War II. (Kingdon-Ward believed Chit Ko Ko was only 26 years old at the time, although he was in fact 36.)

The 1953 expedition lasted for 37 weeks and was in a region of Myanmar known as the Triangle, north of Myitkyina in the northern state of Kachin. The explorers also worked in Sumpra Bum and Hkinlum. They set off on an expedition and reached Hkinlum in several days in the alpine region where they could expect to find hardy plants. During the expedition Chit Ko Ko was reported to have caught a bad chill and had to be rubbed back to warmth. Nevertheless, the expedition was a success and the team collected 37 species of Rhododendrons and nearly 100 other species and 1400 herbarium specimens, including the epiphytic lilly Lilium arboricola and Lonicera hildebrandiana, a honeysuckle with huge flowers. During the journey, Tha Hla wrote field notes while Chit Ko Ko pressed and preserved plants and attached labels to the collections. Kingdon-Ward wrote about this journey in his 1956 book Return to the Irrawaddy. Chit Ko Ko also wrote about the expedition in a paper published by the RHS in 2000.

In 1956 Chit Ko Ko with colleague U Maung Gale accompanied Frank and Jean Kingdon-Ward on a second expedition to Mount Victoria in the Chin Hills. Then 70 years old, this was Kingdon-Ward's last major expedition. Kingdon-Ward did not write a book about this expedition but did write a technical report about the trip and mention the journey in his Pilgrimage for Plants. This expedition was chronicled by Chit Ko in his book, The Flower Hunter from Hkaw-Nu-Sone for which he received the Sarpay Beikman Literary Award.

== Later career (1958 onward) ==
Under the Colmbo Plan Scheme he attended the Forest Research Institute and Colleges in New Forest, Dehra. At this time he also studied botany, silviculture, and herbarium techniques under G. R. Hingorani. In 1959 he accompanied Harold St. John, Oliver Milton, and R. D. Estes on botanical explorations within the country.

In 1960, his book co-authored with John Henry Lace, R. Rodger and H. G. Hundley, List of trees, shrubs, herbs, and climbers of Burma was published by the government printing press.

In 1961 he was transferred to the Frontier Areas Administration. In 1962 he was sent to Indonesia to study the culture and medicine of plants and orchids at the Bogor Botanical Gardens and in 1963 he was sent to Japan to study horticulture.

In 1965 he was transferred to the Agricultural and Rural Development Corporation where he stayed for the remainder of his career, retiring in 1983. In 1983 he also published the book Saramayri Traveller for which he was awarded the National Literary Award.

In 1991 he authored The flower hunter from Hkaw-Nu-Sone and was awarded the Sarpay Beikman Literary Award.

== Legacy ==
In his home country of Myanmar, U Chit Ko Ko is remembered as one of the nation's leading botanists and plant collectors by the present-day generation of botanists and horticulturists. His work was foundational for current projects in the country including The Botanical Exploration in Myanmar project between the U.S. National Herbarium, the Forest Department of Myanmar, and the University of Yangon.

His work with Frank Kingdon-Ward has been recognized by the international community, including in a 2017 exhibit at the New York Botanical Garden titled The New York Botanical Garden in Myanmar: Orchids and Beyond which highlighted the work of U Chit Ko Ko, English plant hunter Frank Kingdon-Ward, Myanmar botanist Saw Lwin, and American botanist Kate Armstrong.

The Myanmar Floriculturalist's Association planned to produce English translations of his Mount Saramati and Mount Victoria books for their 2009 celebrations. These translations have not yet been made available to a global audience.
