= Tha Hla =

Tha Hla (Burmese: သာလှ, pronounced [θà l̥a̰]; 1916– ?) was a noted Burmese botanist and forestry warden.

He began his career in Burmese forestry around 1934. In 1951, along with Chit Ko Ko he met English botanist Francis Kingdon-Ward and conducted further research into plants in Burma. They set off on an expedition and reached Hkinlum in several days in the alpine region where they could expect to find hardy plants. During the expedition Tha Hla was reported to have got lost whilst searching for new Rhododendrons. Several people went out in search of him and preparations begun for a full search in the morning but he returned to camp late in the night. During the trip Tha Hla was also reported to have got a twig in his eye, giving him severe pain for some days. Nevertheless, the expedition was a success and the team collected 37 species of Rhododendrons and nearly 100 other species and 1400 herbarium specimens, including the epiphytic lilly Lilium arboricola and Lonicera hildebrandiana, a honeysuckle with huge flowers.
