= Lilium arboricola =

Scientific classification
- Kingdom: Plantae
- Clade: Tracheophytes
- Clade: Angiosperms
- Clade: Monocots
- Order: Liliales
- Family: Liliaceae
- Subfamily: Lilioideae
- Tribe: Lilieae
- Genus: Lilium
- Species: L. arboricola

Binomial name
- Lilium arboricola Stearn

Species of epiphyte

Lilium arboricola is an epiphytic lily species with green flowers, and orange-red anthers. It was first botanically described by Francis Kingdon-Ward and his assistants Chit Ko Ko and Tha Hla after a collection in the Shan region of Myanmar in 1953. Specimens from this collection flowered once in cultivation in Great Britain and were then lost. It was thought that it had been rediscovered in Lao Cai, Vietnam, in 2006, and introduced thence to Britain and Canada, but this turned out to be a new species (Lilium eupetes)
