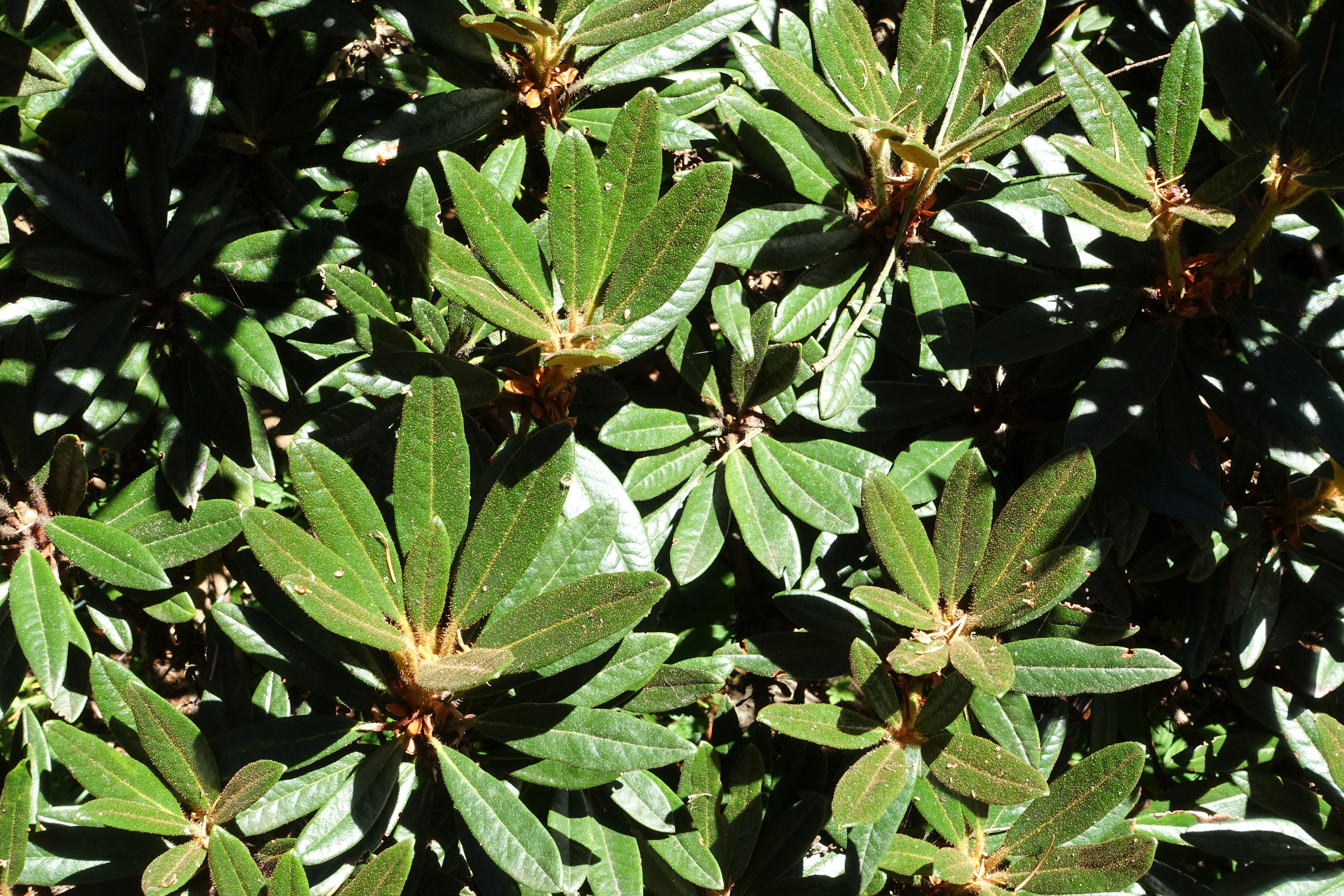

Scientific classification
- Kingdom: Plantae
- Clade: Tracheophytes
- Clade: Angiosperms
- Clade: Eudicots
- Clade: Asterids
- Order: Ericales
- Family: Ericaceae
- Genus: Rhododendron
- Species: R. recurvoides

Binomial name
- Rhododendron recurvoides Tagg & Kingdon-Ward

= Rhododendron recurvoides =

Species of plant

Rhododendron recurvoides is a species of flowering plant in the family Ericaceae. It is native to northeastern Upper Myanmar, where it grows at altitudes of about 3,400 m (11,200 ft). It is a dwarf shrub that grows to 1–1.5 m (3.3–4.9 ft) in height, with leathery leaves that are lanceolate to oblanceolate, and 3-7 x l-2 cm in size. The flowers are white flushed with pink, and spotted crimson.
