= Shirui =

Shirui Shiroi
- Village
- Location in Manipur, India Shirui (India)
- Coordinates: 25°07′44″N 94°25′09″E
- Country: India
- State: Manipur
- District: Ukhrul

Population
  - Total: 1,018

Languages
  - Official: Tangkhul (Shirui tui)
- Time zone: UTC+5:30 (IST)
- PIN: 795142
- Vehicle registration: MN
- Nearest city: Ukhrul Kohima
- Literacy: 95.49%
- Lok Sabha constituency: Outer Manipur
- Vidhan Sabha constituency: Ukhrul
- Website: manipur.gov.in

Shirui, initially called Shiroy/Shiroi, is a village located north of Ukhrul in Ukhrul district, Manipur state, India. The village is 15 kilometers from Ukhrul. National Highway 150 Imphal-Kohima via Jessami passes through the village. The village is divided into two parts, Shirui ato and Shirui aze; however, both the parts are under one chief. Shirui is famous for the rich and flora found on Shirui Kashong or Shirui peak and especially for blooming of the rare Lilium mackliniae during the start of Monsoon. The village is flanked by Ukhrul in the west, Langdang in the south, Mapum in the east, Sihai in the North east and Lunghar in the north. Locally inhabitants speak Shirui dialect which belongs to the Tibeto-Burman language family.

== Total population ==
According to 2011 census, Shirui ato has 100 households with the total of 472 people of which 296 are male and 176 are female. Of the total population, 49 were in the age group of 0–6 years. The average sex ratio of Shirui ato is 595 female to 1000 male which is lower than the state average of 985. The literacy rate of the village stands at 90.31%. Male literacy rate stands at 93.02% while female literacy rate was 86.06%.

As per 2011 census, Shirui aze has 184 households with the total of 793 people of which 393 are male and 400 are female. Of the total population, 106 were in the age group of 0–6 years. The average sex ratio of Shirui aze is 1018 female to 1000 male which is higher than the state average of 985. The literacy rate of the village stands at 95.49%. Male literacy rate stands at 98.27% while female literacy rate was 92.65%.

== People and occupation ==
The village is home to people of Tangkhul Naga tribe. Majority of the inhabitants are Christians. Agriculture is the primary occupation of the inhabitants. Shirui Lily, the state flower of Manipur state blooms at Shirui Kashong during the last week of May through the second week of June.

Due to unchecked deforestation and climate change, the population of the wild flower is said to be depleting every year and has been tagged as an endangered flower. Every year, the village hosts a week long festival called the Shirui Lily week to showcase the rich Tangkhul traditional cuisines and attires, flower show, painting competition and entertainment programmes as an attempt to spread awareness to safeguard the rare flower. In 2017, the Government of Manipur declared Shirui Lily Festival as a state festival which is now being celebrated every year with much fanfare.
