= Langdang =

- Village
- Location in Manipur, India Langdang (India)
- Coordinates: 25°06′44″N 94°24′09″E
- Country: India
- State: Manipur
- District: Ukhrul

Population
  - Total: 1,135

Languages
  - Official: Tangkhul (Langdang tui)
- Time zone: UTC+5:30 (IST)
- PIN: 795142
- Vehicle registration: MN
- Nearest city: Ukhrul Kohima
- Literacy: 81.45%
- Lok Sabha constituency: Outer Manipur
- Vidhan Sabha constituency: Ukhrul
- Website: manipur.gov.in

Langdang is a village located north of Ukhrul in Ukhrul district, Manipur state, India. The village is 13 kilometers from Ukhrul. National Highway 150 Imphal-Kohima via Jessami passes through the village. The village is divided into two major parts, Langdang Khullen and Langdang Phungthar; however, both the parts are under one chief. The village is famous for largescale plum cultivation. The village is flanked by Mapum in the east, Shirui in the north, Ukhrul in the west and Choithar in the south.

== Total population ==
According to 2011 census, Langdang as a whole has 207 households with the total of 1135 people of which 596 are male and 539 are female. Of the total population, 127 were in the age group of 0–6 years. The average sex ratio of the village is 904 female to 1000 male which is lower than the state average of 985. The literacy rate of the village stands at 81.45%. Male literacy rate stands at 84.91% while female literacy rate was 77.62%.

== People and occupation ==
The village is home to people of Tangkhul Naga tribe. Majority of the inhabitants are Christians. Agriculture is the primary occupation of the inhabitants. The village is one of the beneficiaries under NERCOMP-IFAD and recently a new CFC hall was inaugurated under the patronage of IFAD. The village was also in news recently for the spread of a mysterious pine tree disease that affected large area of the village forest and also flooding of paddy fields due to incessant rain.
