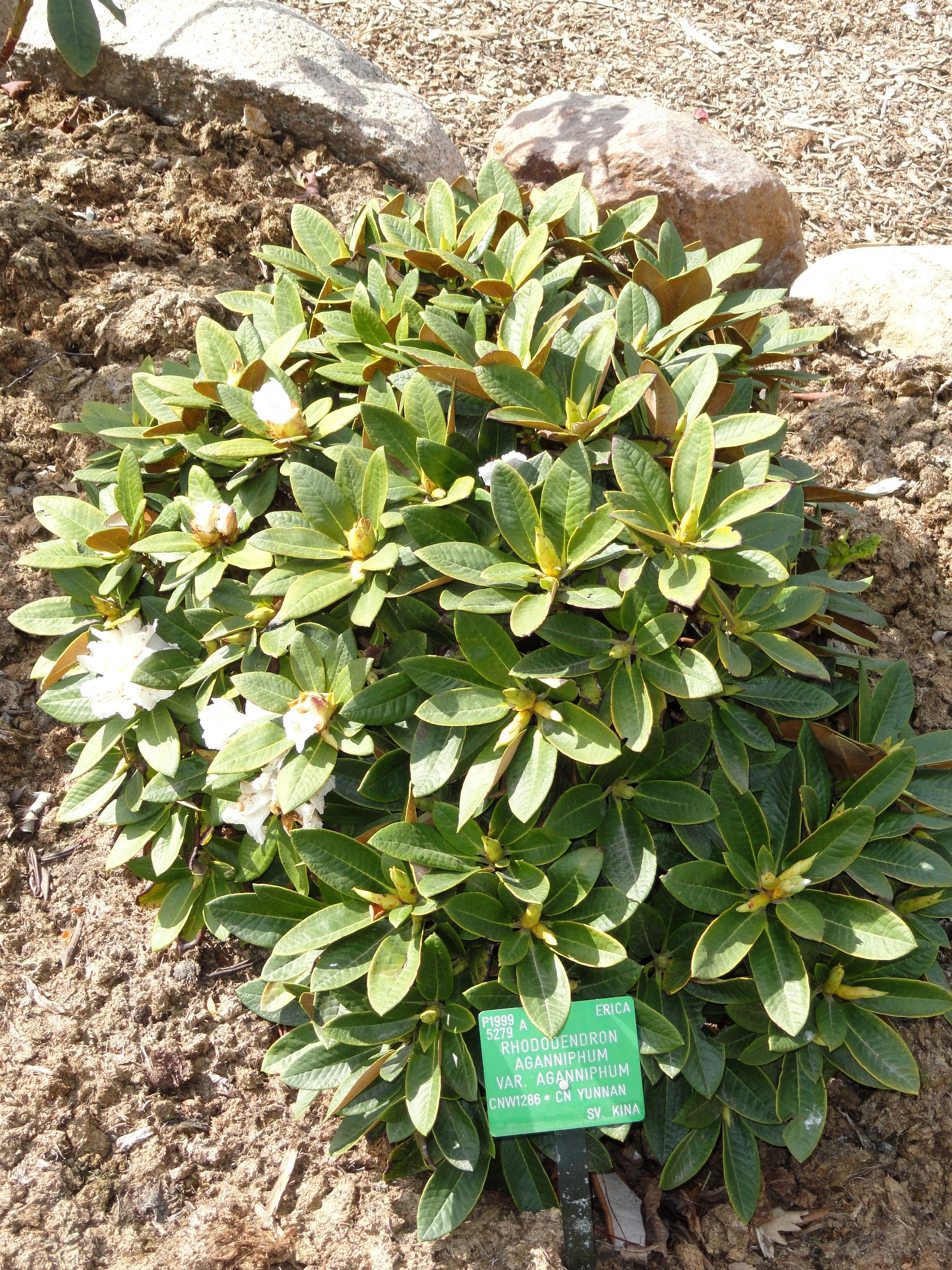
- Rododendron aganniphum var. aganniphum

Scientific classification
- Kingdom: Plantae
- Clade: Embryophytes
- Clade: Tracheophytes
- Clade: Spermatophytes
- Clade: Angiosperms
- Clade: Eudicots
- Clade: Asterids
- Order: Ericales
- Family: Ericaceae
- Genus: Rhododendron
- Species: R. aganniphum

Binomial name
- Rhododendron aganniphum Balf.f. & Kingdon-Ward

Synonyms
- Rhododendron aganniphum var. glaucopeplum (Balf.f. & Forrest) T.L.Ming; Rhododendron glaucopeplum Balf.f. & Forrest

= Rhododendron aganniphum =

Species of plant

Rhododendron aganniphum is a species of flowering plant in the heath family Ericaceae, native to Tibet and southwestern China (southern Qinghai, western Sichuan, southeastern Xizang, and northwestern Yunnan), where it grows at altitudes of 2,700–4,700 m (8,900–15,400 ft). It is a compact evergreen shrub that grows to 1–4 m (3.3–13.1 ft) in height, with thick, leathery leaves that are oblong to elliptic-oblong and 4.5–12 by 2–6 cm in size. The flowers are rose-flushed white with maroon flecks, and often pink streaks.

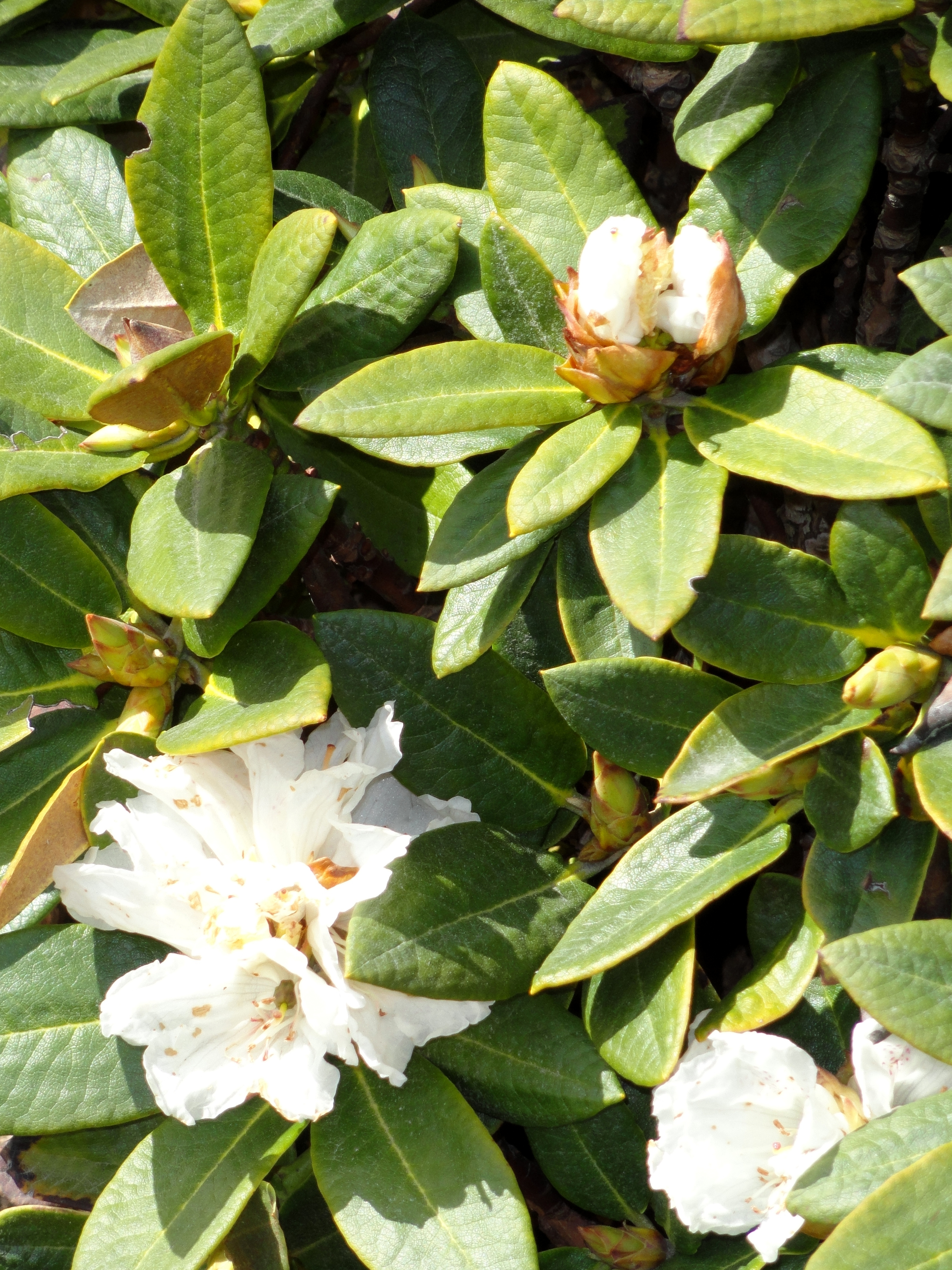
