= Denham Roundabout =

Traffic roundabout in Buckinghamshire, England

Coordinates: 51.561°N 0.496°W

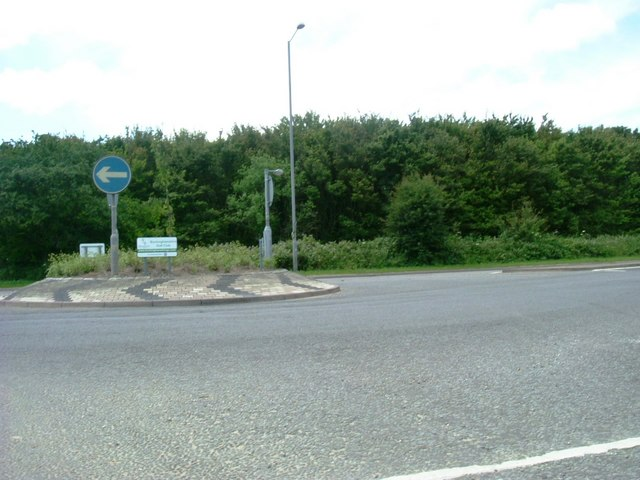
Denham Roundabout

The Denham Roundabout is a road junction in Denham, Buckinghamshire. It was originally opened in 1943 in conjunction with the completion of the new Western Avenue route into west London. The Western Avenue took over the classification of the A40, with the previous route to London, via Uxbridge and Ealing, being reclassified as the A4020. The roundabout also included a new link to A412 that formed part of the outer London orbital route.

Since 1973, the westbound A40, now flows into the M40 motorway at this point. The roundabout below facilitates junction 1 (J1) of the motorway to connect with the westbound continuation of the A40, together with the intersection of the road from Uxbridge (A4020) and the road from Slough to Watford (A412).

When the M40 from Denham to High Wycombe was built, Western Avenue was extended at high level to make an end-on join with the motorway, and a larger roundabout was built below the bridges carrying the motorway. When first laid out, the roundabout had the traffic going round it clockwise in the usual way, but as traffic volumes built up, the layout was altered so that the traffic moved round the roundabout in both directions, making it a ring junction with roundabouts at the points that other roads join the main roundabout.

== See also ==
- Magic Roundabout (Colchester)
- Magic Roundabout (Hemel Hempstead)
- Magic Roundabout (High Wycombe)
- Magic Roundabout (Swindon)
- Hatton Cross Roundabout
