= Magic Roundabout (High Wycombe) =

Ring junction in High Wycombe, Buckinghamshire, England,

Coordinates: 51°37′37″N 0°45′2″W

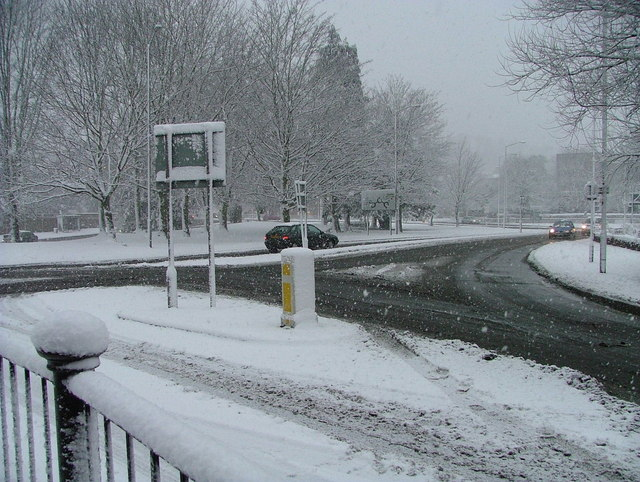
The A40/A404 junction in snow conditions

The Magic Roundabout (officially named Abbey Way Gyratory) in High Wycombe, Buckinghamshire, England, is similar to the complex roundabouts in Hemel Hempstead and other places. It is located on the junction of the A40 and A404 roads.

== Routes served ==
The junction is the second meeting point of the two roads; they interchange at the start of the A404 in Marylebone, London, with the A40 forming the Westway. The two roads follow different routes to reach Wycombe, the A40 coming via Beaconsfield and the A404 via North London and Amersham. From the roundabout, the A40 continues towards Oxford, Cheltenham, Gloucester and South Wales, whilst the A404 goes south to Marlow and Maidenhead.

Additionally, two minor roads and the main entrance gate of Wycombe Abbey school emerge onto the gyratory.

== See also ==
- Magic Roundabout (Colchester)
- Magic Roundabout (Hemel Hempstead)
- Magic Roundabout (Swindon)
- Denham Roundabout
- Hatton Cross Roundabout
