= Magic Roundabout (Hemel Hempstead) =

Roundabout in Hemel Hempstead, England

Plough Roundabout
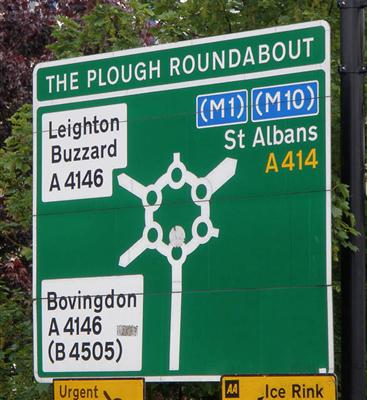
- Sign approaching the Plough Roundabout from the south on the A414
- Interactive map of Plough Roundabout

Location
- Hemel Hempstead, England
- Coordinates: 51°44′46″N 00°28′23″W
- Roads at junction: A414 (Two Waters Road / St Albans Road); A4146 (Station Road / Leighton Buzzard Road); Lawn Lane; Selden Hill

Construction
- Type: Roundabout
- Constructed: 1973

The Plough Roundabout (known locally as the "Magic Roundabout") is a ring junction in Hemel Hempstead, England, notable for its design comprising six mini roundabouts connected in a circle by two-way roads. The local name stems from the children's television programme The Magic Roundabout, similar to the Swindon Magic Roundabout.

== Description ==
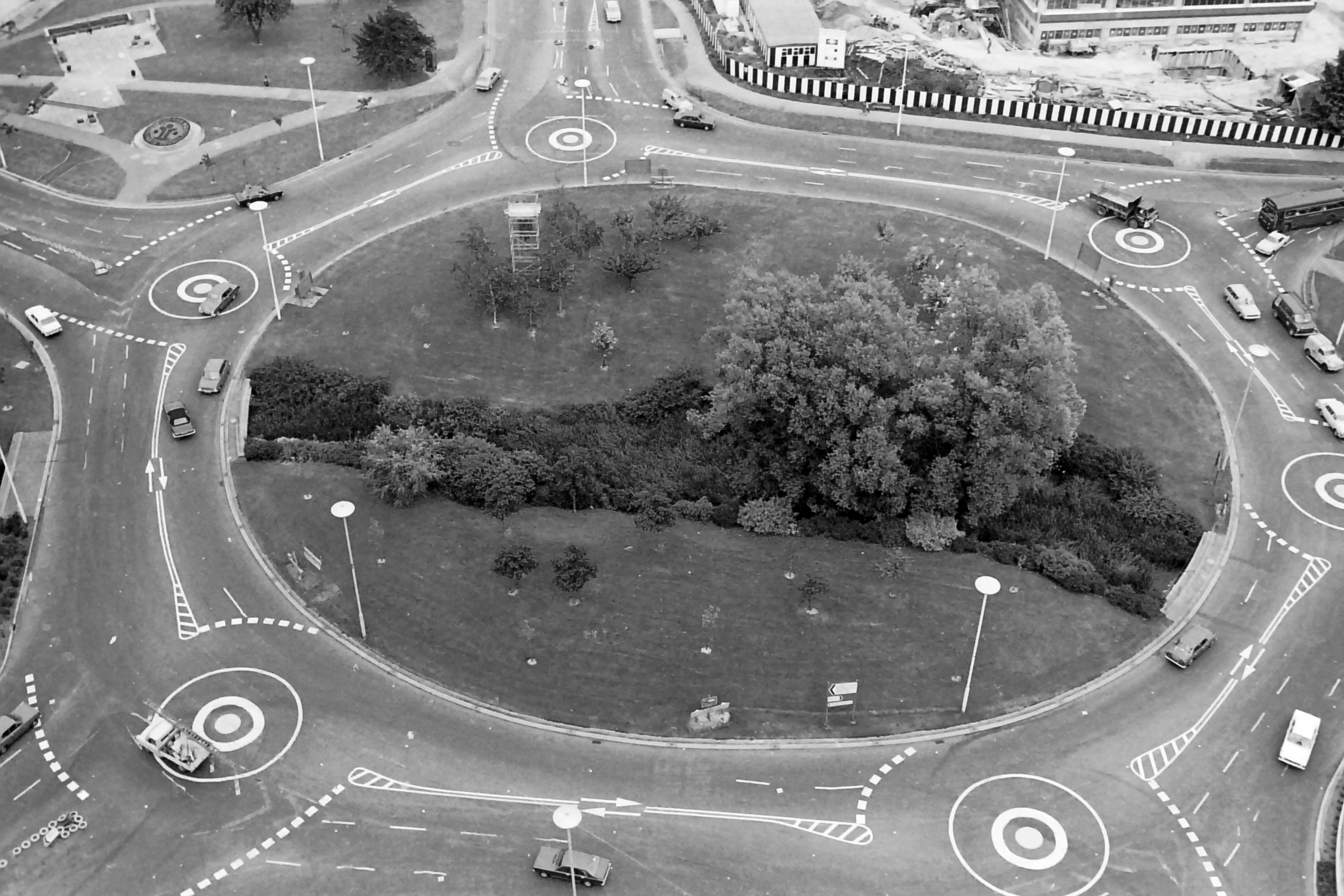
The Plough Roundabout as photographed in 1973.

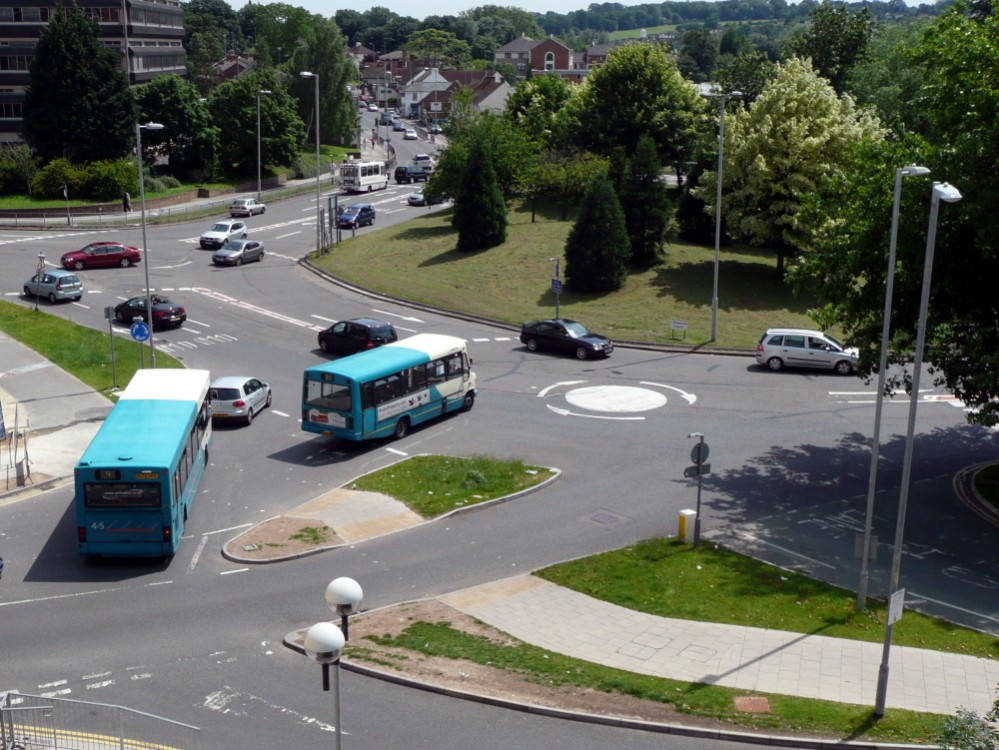
Magic Roundabout, looking south with mini roundabouts 1 (nearest), 2 and 3 in view. The grassy bank at the centre of the picture is part of the central hub roundabout. Taken from part of the 'Riverside' development.

Constructed in 1973, the roundabout was voted the UK's second-worst roundabout in a 2005 poll held by an insurance company (the winner being its Swindon counterpart).

In 2011, the roundabout was voted the best in Britain by motorists in a competition organised by a car leasing service.

The roundabout is unusual in that traffic flows both clockwise (the standard flow direction of British roundabouts) and anticlockwise. Drivers approaching the roundabout from any junction can choose to turn left or right, and they are free to make U-turns using any of the mini roundabouts at the junction. Effectively, the junction should be treated as six individual roundabouts - right of way must be given on the approach of each new mini roundabout.

The official name relates to a former public house, called The Plough Inn, which was between the junction of what is now Selden Hill and St Albans Road.

Line drawing of the roundabout in its first configuration. The road labelled '2' is the dual-carriageway St Albans Road and provides the main access to Hemel from the M1 motorway.

== Early history ==
The original magic roundabout had six exits in total, with the BP building spanning "Marlowes", the road leading to the town centre, in the approximate position of the earlier railway viaduct. The BP building was found to be unstable due to defective reinforced concrete and the exit had to be closed. The building was demolished but the original route was not restored, although a newer side exit from the roundabout replaced the junction with Marlowes off a side road.

Before Hemel Hempstead became a new town the roads met in a simple junction which was then replaced by a standard roundabout.

== See also ==
=== Other similar roundabouts ===
- Magic Roundabout (Colchester)
- Magic Roundabout (High Wycombe)
- Magic Roundabout (Swindon)
- Denham Roundabout
- Hatton Cross Roundabout
