= Magic Roundabout (Colchester) =

Coordinates: 51°53′4″N 0°55′57.5″E

Greenstead roundabout
- Layout of the Greenstead roundabout
- Interactive map of Greenstead roundabout

Location
- Colchester
- Roads at junction: A133 A134

Construction
- Type: Magic roundabout
- Lanes: 2 in each direction

The Greenstead roundabout is a large roundabout junction in Colchester, Essex, England.

It is a "magic roundabout", where traffic travels both directions around a central island. It is a ring junction comprising five mini roundabouts, with two lanes in each direction, joining each to its neighbour. It is known for its complexity, and the resulting confusion it causes for some motorists. The nickname "magic roundabout" comes from the television programme, The Magic Roundabout, which was popular in the 1970s, when this novel layout was devised.

It is located between the Hythe and Greenstead areas of the town, with the A133 (St Andrew's Avenue); Avon Way; Greenstead Road and the A134 (Elmstead Road).

The Colchester roundabout lacks the intermediate traffic islands found on the similar roundabout in Swindon, but nonetheless it is possible to traverse around the large inner roundabout in a clockwise or an anticlockwise direction as desired.

The creation of the roundabout stirred much controversy among the local community, as large amounts of the nearby Greenstead cemetery were destroyed to make way for the project. Since that time, many houses have been built between the roundabout and the cemetery, diminishing the size and use of the cemetery significantly, with the majority of housing now being let to students.

== See also ==
- Magic Roundabout (Hemel Hempstead)
- Magic Roundabout (High Wycombe)
- Magic Roundabout (Swindon)
- Denham Roundabout
- Hatton Cross Roundabout
