= Shirui Lily Festival =

Annual cultural festival in Manipur

Shirui Lily Festival is an annual cultural state festival of Manipur organised by Manipur Tourism Department. Initially, the festival was celebrated by the locals of Shirui village in Ukhrul to pay tribute to the state flower Shirui Lily that blooms from the last week of May through the second week of June. In 2017, Shirui Lily Festival was declared as a state festival by the Government of Manipur. The 2023 Shirui Lily Festival was postponed due to the prevailing tension in the region. The festival returned to Manipur on May 20, 2025 after a two-year pause because of the long-drawn conflict in the state.

== Festival locations ==
After being declared as a state festival, three venues were selected to celebrate the festival.

- Ukhrul
- Shirui
- Hungpung

== Main Attractions ==
The four day festival showcases cultural events, artifacts, games, music and food of Manipur state in general and particularly that of the Tangkhul Naga tribe. The main attractions of the festival are:

- ShiRock where rock bands from across the country competes for best rock music title. The event also features international bands to perform mainly on the opening and closing nights.
- ShiChef where chefs compete to showcase their cooking skills and recipes.
- Miss Spring Pageant where maidens walk the ramp to win the Miss Lily or Miss Spring title.
