= Magic Roundabout (Swindon) =

Roundabout in Swindon, England

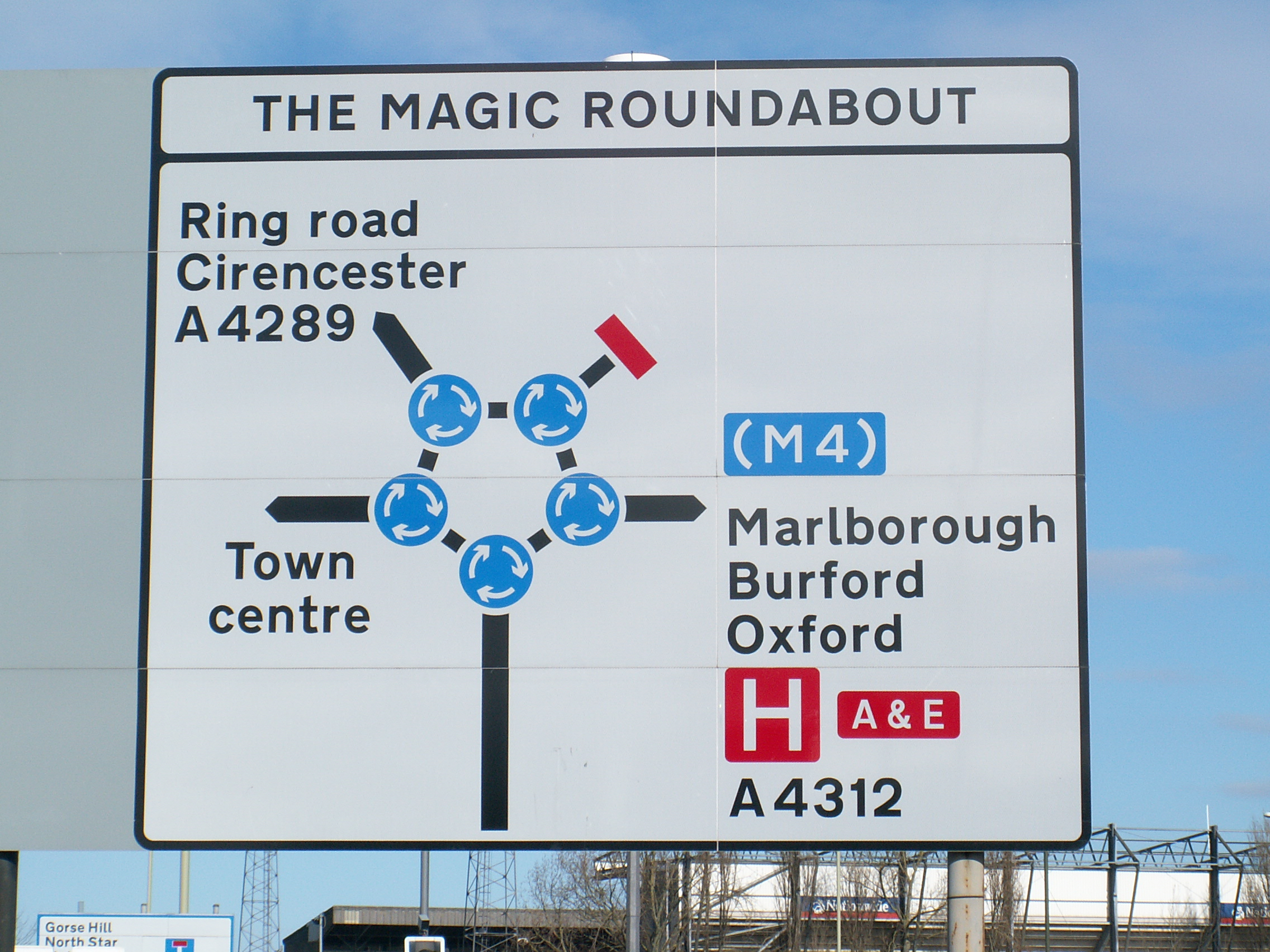
- Sign approaching the Magic Roundabout from the south on the B4289
- Interactive map of Magic Roundabout

Location
- Swindon, England
- Coordinates: 51°33′46″N 1°46′17″W
- Roads at junction: A4259 (County Road / Queen's Drive); Fleming Way; Drove Road; Shrivenham Road

Construction
- Type: Roundabout
- Constructed: 1972

The Magic Roundabout in Swindon, England, is a ring junction constructed in 1972 consisting of five mini-roundabouts arranged in a circle. Located near the County Ground, home of Swindon Town F.C., its name comes from the popular children's television series The Magic Roundabout. In 2009, it was voted the fourth-scariest junction in Britain.

== History ==
=== Concept ===
The roundabout was constructed according to the design of Frank Blackmore, of the British Transport and Road Research Laboratory. Traffic flow around the inner circle is anticlockwise, and traffic flows in the usual clockwise manner around the five mini-roundabouts on the outer loop.

=== The roundabout ===
Swindon Magic Roundabout map with traffic direction and two routes from Fleming Way to Queen's Drive (give way at the arrowheads)

The complex junction offers multiple paths between feeder roads. The outer circle carries traffic in a clockwise direction, like a normal roundabout (in places where traffic drives on the left side of the road), and less proficient users may choose to use only the outer circle. The inner circle carries traffic in an anticlockwise direction, and more proficient users may choose to use the alternative paths.

Virtually the same overall configuration has been in place for 53 years.

When the roundabout complex was first opened, the mini-roundabouts were not permanently marked out and could be reconfigured while the layout was fine-tuned. A police officer was stationed at each mini roundabout during this pilot phase to oversee how drivers coped with the unique arrangement.

The roundabout is built over a section of the old Wilts & Berks Canal—Swindon wharf. A narrow, stone bridge built c. 1810, which is a Grade II listed building, carried the old Saxon way known as Drove Road over the canal half a mile (800 m) east of the town centre. Its site became covered by Drove Roundabout, which was later redeveloped as the Magic Roundabout. A wharf occupied one edge and the area was known as the Marsh. The Wilts & Berks Canal Trust are currently in negotiations with Swindon Council to include in the New Swindon Regeneration Framework plans to restore the canal through the town centre. The restoration would use the route of the North Wilts Canal and not the main West Vale route that the Magic Roundabout sits over. The North Wilts Canal was a separate branch which exited the town northwards through Moredon.

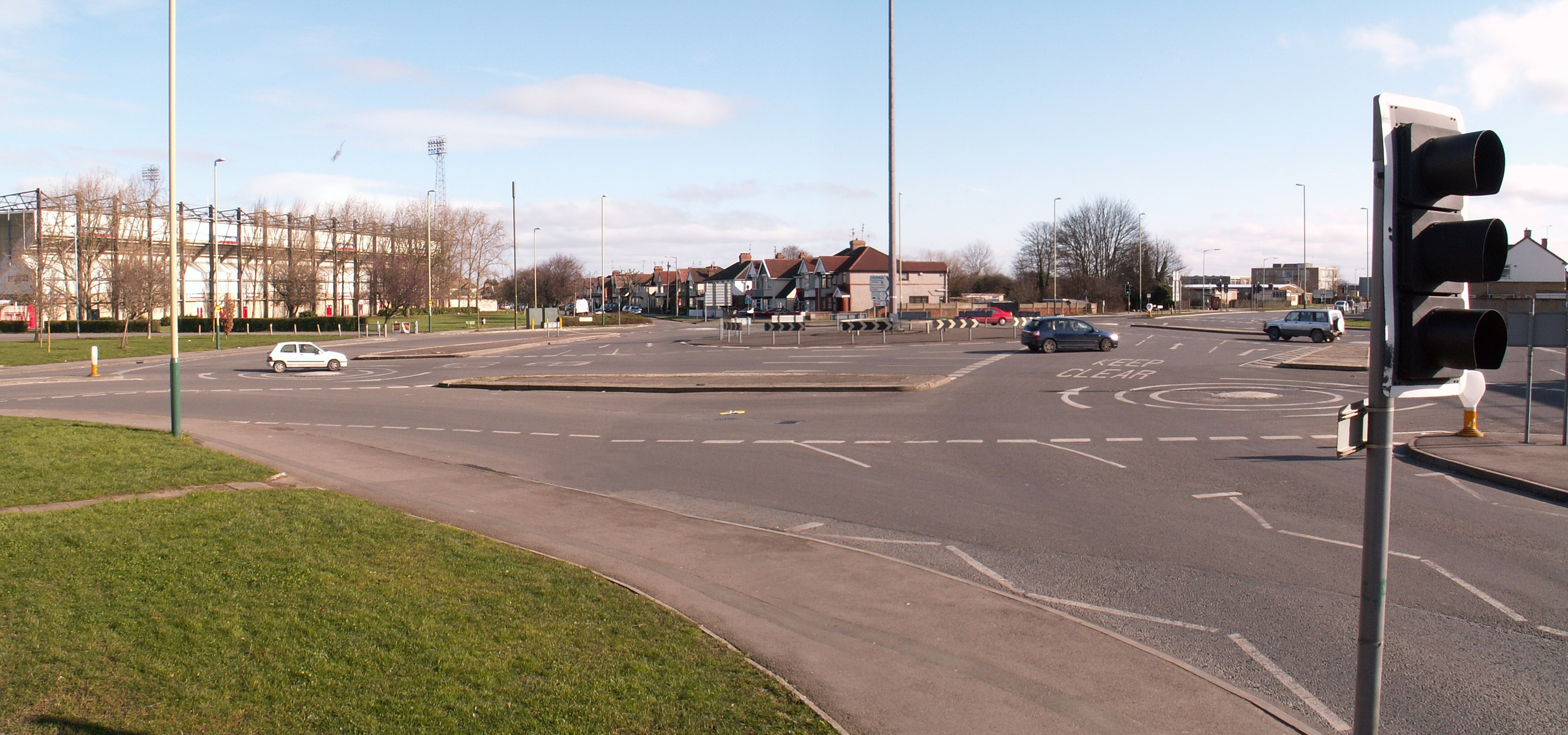
The central circle and two mini-roundabouts

A calendar is produced each year by the UK Roundabout Appreciation Society depicting the town's finest examples. The official name of the roundabout was originally County Islands, but it was changed in the early 1980s to match its popular name after a campaign by Councillor David Glaholm.

In 2005, it was voted the worst roundabout in a survey of the general public by a UK insurance company. In September 2007, the Magic Roundabout was named as one of the world's worst junctions by a UK motoring magazine. In December 2007, BBC News reported a survey identifying The Magic Roundabout as one of the "10 Scariest Junctions in the United Kingdom"; however, the roundabout provides a better throughput of traffic than other designs and has an excellent safety record, since traffic moves too slowly to do serious damage in the event of a collision.

The roundabout in Drove Road is not the only one in Swindon that worked on the same principle; until recently, the roundabout at Bruce Street Bridges had a similar layout, but had only four entry/exit points. It was converted into a conventional roundabout in 2016.

== See also ==
- Denham Roundabout
- Magic Roundabout (Colchester)
- Magic Roundabout (Hemel Hempstead)
- Magic Roundabout (High Wycombe)
- Hatton Cross Roundabout
