= Winifred Mary Ward =

British speech therapist

Winifred Mary Ward FRCSLT
- Born: 12 October 1884
- Died: January 26, 1979 (aged 94)
- Occupation: Speech Therapist

Academic work
- Institutions: West London Hospital; Royal College of Speech and Language Therapists

Winifred Mary Ward FRCSLT (12 October 1884 – 26 January 1979) was a pioneering British speech therapist.

== Early life ==
Winifred was born on 12 October 1884 in Victoria Street, Old Charlton, London to parents Harry Marshall Ward and Selina Mary Ward (née Kingdon).

== Career ==
Her first career was as a singing teacher, but after World War I she was so affected by the plight of shell shock victims that she turned most of her attention to trying to help them. She began working at the West London Hospital in Maida Vale and at Pembury in Kent, helping traumatised men to speak.

She left the West End Hospital school in 1935 to spend time in South Africa. When she returned to London in the late 1930s she was unable to resume her old post and took steps to set up a different course in conjunction with a former student, Amy Swallow. Ward was instrumental in setting up the London hospitals school of speech therapy (later called the Kingdon-Ward school of speech therapy), which was founded in 1942 in Cavendish Square.

She was a founder fellow of the College of Speech Therapists now the Royal College of Speech and Language Therapists. She wrote several books on the subject of speech therapy, as well as poems for children and poems specifically for use in teaching aspects of speech. Her 1941 work on stammering was the first major text on the subject in the British literature and was one of the earliest works on any topic in the field. She was one of the first authorities to recognise that there are different types and causes of stammering and she maintained that therapists should adapt their approach accordingly.

== Personal life ==
Winifred was the sister of Francis Kingdon Ward and was also known as Winifred Kingdon-Ward by association. She died in the St Charles Hospital, Kensington, London, on 26 January 1979.

== Select publications ==
- 1941. Stammering: a Contribution to the Study of its Problems and Treatment.
- 1954. A book of rhymes and jingles for children from four to fourteen, for the use of speech therapists and teachers of the spoken word. Black.
- 1969. Helping the stroke patient to speak. Churchill.
