= Jean Rasmussen =

British explorer and botanical collector

- Born: Jean Macklin; 27 January 1921; Bombay, British India
- Died: 3 December 2011 (aged 90); Eastbourne, Sussex, England
- Other name: Jean Kingdon-Ward
- Occupations: botanist, botanical collector and writer
- Organization: Royal Horticultural Society
- Known for: botanical collecting and writing
- Notable work: My Hill So Strong
- Spouse: Frank Kingdon-Ward (m. 1947, died 1958)

Jean Rasmussen formerly Jean Kingdon-Ward née Macklin (27 January 1921 – 3 December 2011) was a botanist, botanical collector, explorer and writer who participated in five major expeditions in India and Burma, backed by the Royal Horticultural Society.

== Biography ==
Rasmussen was born as Jean Macklin on 27 January 1921 in Bombay. She was the daughter of an English High Court judge.

During her expeditions to India and Burma, backed by the Royal Horticultural Society, Rasmussen collected numerous scientific specimens of plants, some of which were new to science. The species Lilium mackliniae was named in her honour.

Rasmussen wrote about her expedition to the Lohit river valley on the border of Tibet and her experiences with the 1950 Assam–Tibet earthquake during that expedition in her book My Hill So Strong.

== Personal life ==
On 12 November 1947, Rasmussen married botanist Frank Kingdon-Ward, after they met in India. At the time of the marriage she was 26 and he was 62. Immediately after their marriage, they went on a plant collecting expedition to Manipur in Northern India. Rasmussen's husband Frank Kingdon-Ward died on 8 April 1958, aged 72. She was married a second time to a Norwegian man, after which her surname became Rasmussen and moved to Oslo, Norway. She later retired to live in Eastbourne, Sussex.

Rasmussen died on 3 December 2011.
