= Roundabout Appreciation Society =

UK roundabout fan group

The Roundabout Appreciation Society (UKRAS) is a group of people in the United Kingdom that discuss traffic roundabouts. The main topic of discussion is the architecture of the roundabouts, including their design and safety features. Other topics have included the approaches people take when driving towards and around a roundabout, and the wildlife present on some of the larger junctions. Their aim is to promote safe driving and consideration towards other road users.

The society was formed by Kevin Beresford after the success of a calendar that showed photographs of 12 roundabouts in Redditch – as of 2015, it sold 100,000 worldwide since 2003.
