= Lilium eupetes =

Scientific classification
- Kingdom: Plantae
- Clade: Tracheophytes
- Clade: Angiosperms
- Clade: Monocots
- Order: Liliales
- Family: Liliaceae
- Subfamily: Lilioideae
- Tribe: Lilieae
- Genus: Lilium
- Species: L. eupetes

Binomial name
- Lilium eupetes J.M.H.Shaw

Species of epiphyte

Lilium eupetes is a recently discovered and described epiphytic species of lily from the north of Vietnam.

Lilium eupetes reproduces by seed and vegetatively via the production of bulbils dispersed by wind. When the leaves die back they wither and curl into a circle. This eventually detaches from the stem, and acts as the functional equivalent of a samara, carrying the attached bulbil to a new site.
