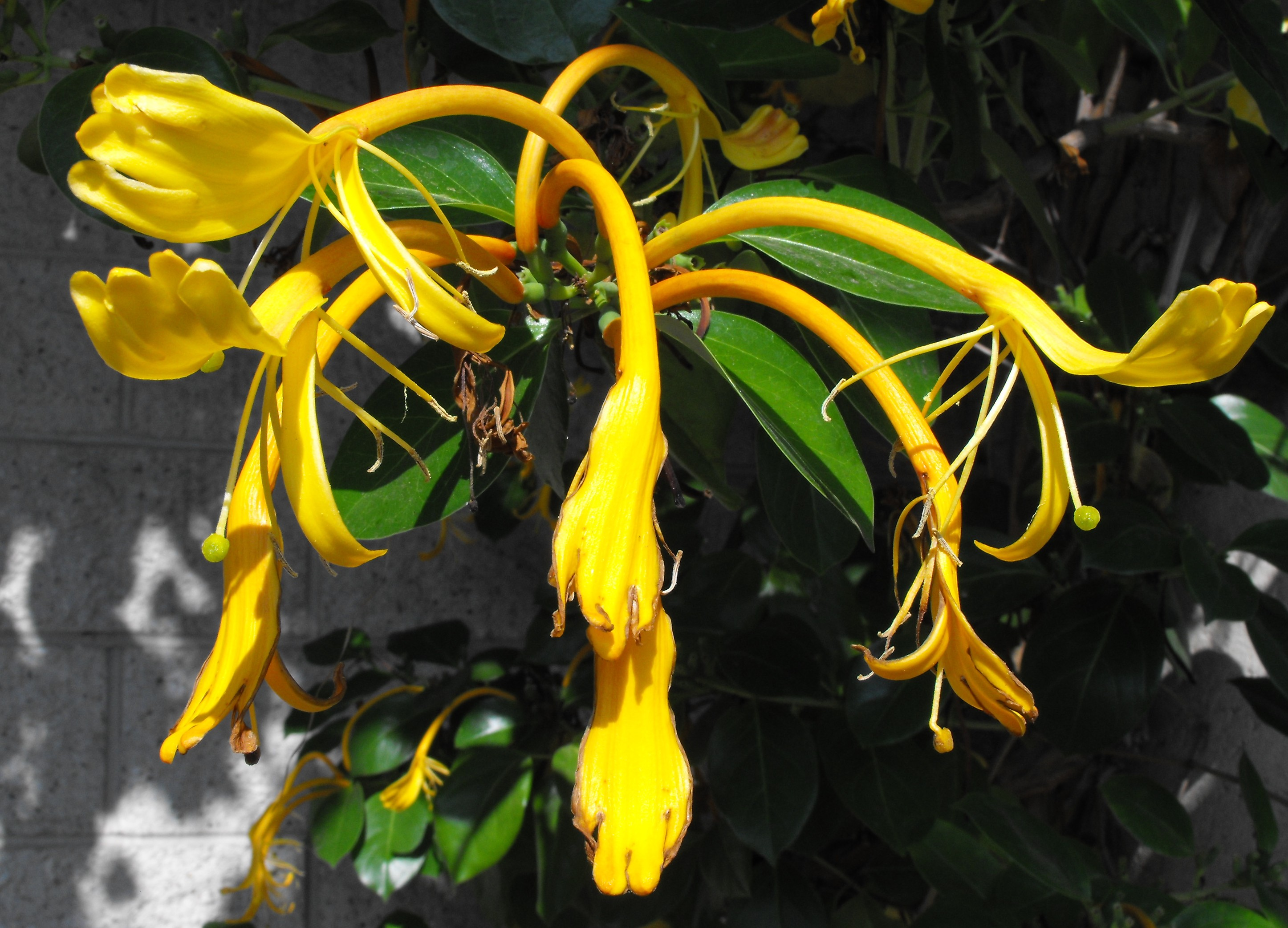

Scientific classification
- Kingdom: Plantae
- Clade: Tracheophytes
- Clade: Angiosperms
- Clade: Eudicots
- Clade: Asterids
- Order: Dipsacales
- Family: Caprifoliaceae
- Genus: Lonicera
- Species: L. hildebrandiana

Binomial name
- Lonicera hildebrandiana Collett & Hemsl.

Synonyms
- Lonicera braceana Hemsley.

= Lonicera hildebrandiana =

Giant Burmese honeysuckle

Species of honeysuckle

Lonicera hildebrandiana, the giant Burmese honeysuckle, is a species of flowering plant in the family Caprifoliaceae. It is native to southeast Asia, in China (Guanxi and Yunnan), Thailand and Burma at elevations of 1,000 to 2,300 m (3,300 to 7,500 ft).

== Description ==
Growing to at least 10 m (33 ft) tall and 8 m (26 ft) broad, with flowers and leaves up to 15 cm (5.9 in) long, this climbing, twining shrub is by far the largest of all the honeysuckles. The evergreen leaves are glossy, and the long thin tubular flowers, up to 18 cm (7.1 in) long, open cream, turning to yellow and orange. The flowers, which have a strong honeysuckle fragrance, appear always in pairs intermittently from spring throughout summer, and are followed in autumn by green berries.

== Taxonomy ==
Lonicera hildebrandiana was found in Burma (now Myanmar) in 1888 by Henry Collett, who named it after a local administrator Arthur Hedding Hildebrand, himself an enthusiastic collector. Hildebrand later sent seeds to Kew Gardens for storage and propagation purposes. Since then, specimens have been located in China and Thailand.

== Cultivation ==
This plant does not tolerate frost, so when cultivated in cold temperate areas it must be grown under glass, either in a large conservatory or greenhouse. When grown in warmer temperate zones, it may be planted in a sheltered bay out of direct winter winds until it has grown to a height above the frost-line. A fully grown plant is relatively heavy, especially after rain, so requires strong support as it is not self-supporting. It has been given the Royal Horticultural Society's Award of Garden Merit.
