= Mapum =

- Village
- Location in Ukhrul, Manipur, India Mapum (India)
- Coordinates: 25°04′41″N 94°30′26″E
- Country: India
- Ukhrul: Manipur
- Ukhrul: Ukhrul

Government
  - Type: Panchayati raj (India)
  - Body: Gram panchayat

Population
  - Total: 1,117

Aputo and tangkhul tui
  - Official: Tangkhul (Mapum tui)
- Time zone: UTC+5:30 (IST)
- PIN: 795142
- Vehicle registration: MN
- Nearest city: Ukhrul
- Literacy: 90.5
- Lok Sabha constituency: Outer Manipur
- Ukhrul: Ukhrul
- Website: manipur.gov.in

Mapum is a village located east of Ukhrul in Ukhrul district, Manipur state, India.

== Total population ==
According to 2011 census, Mapum has 251 households with the total of 1117 people of which 562 are male and 555 are female. Of the total population, 53 were in the age group of 0–6 years. The average sex ratio of the village is 988 female to 1000 male which is higher than the state average of 985. The literacy rate of the village stands at 77.16.40% which is higher than the state average 76.94%. Male literacy rate stands at 84.96% while female literacy rate was 69.36%.
