= Hatton, London =

Coordinates: 51.4678°N 0.4226°W

Hatton
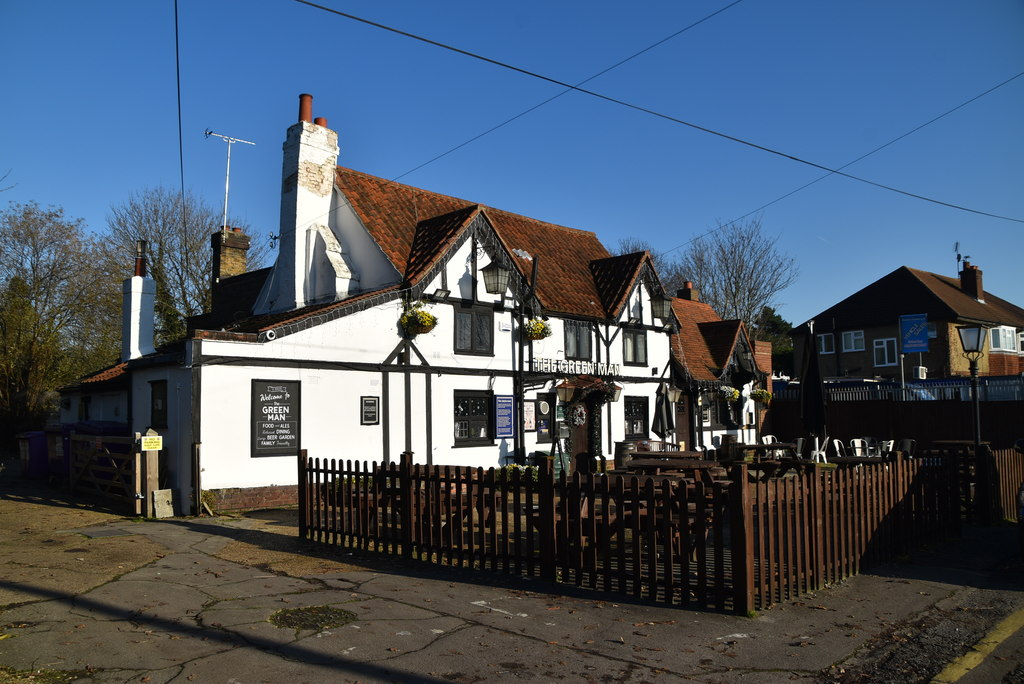
- The Green Man pub in Hatton

- Location within Greater London
- OS grid reference: TQ095755
- London borough: Hillingdon; Hounslow
- Ceremonial county: Greater London
- Region: London
- Country: England
- Sovereign state: United Kingdom
- Post town: HOUNSLOW
- Postcode district: TW6
- Post town: FELTHAM
- Postcode district: TW14
- Dialling code: 020
- Police: Metropolitan
- Fire: London
- Ambulance: London
- UK Parliament: Feltham and Heston
- London Assembly: Ealing and Hillingdon; South West

Hatton including Hatton Cross is a small settlement and locality in the London boroughs of Hillingdon and Hounslow, on the south-eastern edge of London Heathrow Airport and straddling the A30 road. Hatton is situated in the historical county of Middlesex and the present ceremonial county of Greater London.

The area around Hatton was for many years a notorious place for highway robberies; a surviving coaching inn, The Green Man, has a hiding-hole behind the chimney. A nearby road is named Dick Turpin Way, in reference to the area's history. Aside from the heyday of such problems in the 17th and 18th centuries, the area had attractive rural houses with gardens. One of these was built by Edward III and visited by Richard II. Another, centuries later, was the home of Sir Frederick Pollock, 1st Baronet through to his grandson, first cousin of the first Viscount Hanworth, resident at the much larger Hanworth Park.

Hatton remains technically a hamlet or neighbourhood of Bedfont, from which it is separated by a field and local sports facilities. It is flanked to the north and north-west by major roads, depots, warehouses, hotels and parking areas associated with London Heathrow Airport, which take up the north of the locality, leading to the consolidation of that area into Hillingdon since 1994. It is joined to the south by Bedfont and North Feltham, and to the east by the River Crane, across which is Hounslow West. The settled part is the interior and one side of a triangle south of the dualled A30. Further south a line of houses continues, which faces Hounslow Urban Farm and is then engulfed by naming into the North Feltham Trading Estate, such as Feltham Ambulance Station beside the farm. The current naming has eaten into what was once squarely Hatton, just as Heathrow has from the opposite direction. (Note: Parochially and historically North Feltham takes in only land south of Staines Road so all of the North Feltham Trading Estate, the supermarket, its petrol station, HM Immigration Tribunal and the ambulance station are in Hatton.)

== Etymology ==
Hatton's name comes from Anglo-Saxon Hǣþtūn = "heath farmstead"; until 1819 its cultivated area and small residential gardens were surrounded by heath.

== Neighbouring towns and villages ==
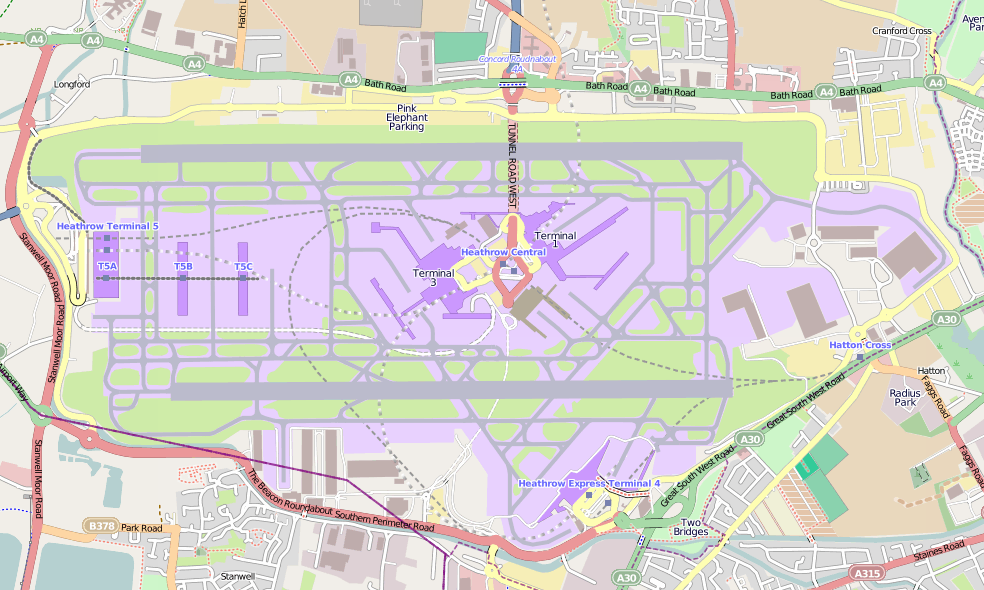
Map of Heathrow Airport and Hatton

It is bordered by North Feltham to the south, Bedfont to the west and south-west and Heathrow Airport to the north. The A30 road has formed the borough boundary with Hillingdon since 1994. Before then the end of a north-east projection, which remains as does the rest of Hatton in the ecclesiastical parish of Bedfont, were kept with the rest of Hatton and its mother village, Bedfont, in the borough of Hounslow. North-west is Cranford. The south-east is technically Hatton but branded North Feltham (Trading Estate), as are all surrounding streets.

== Effects of London Heathrow Airport ==
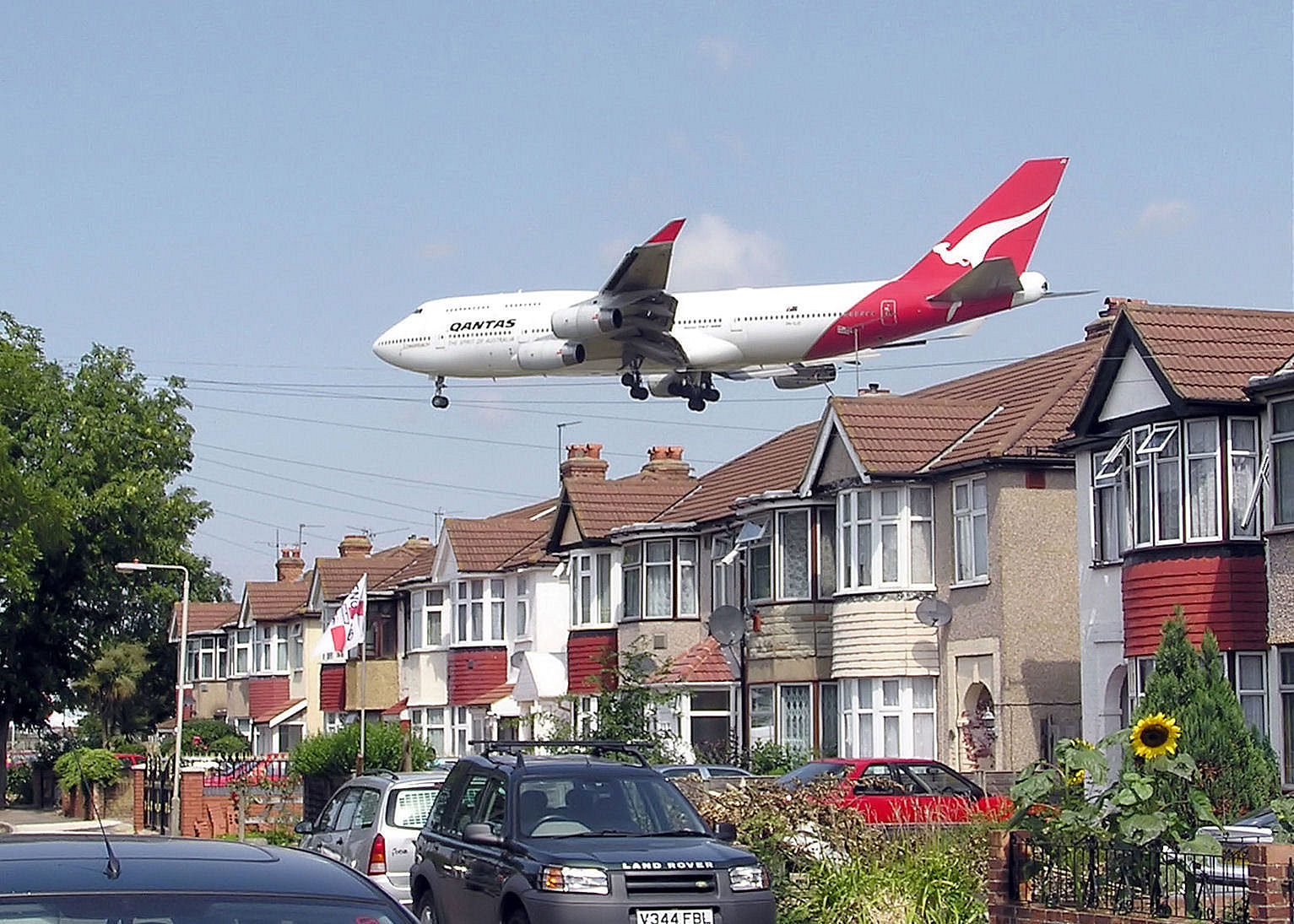
Plane passing over Myrtle Avenue, a common viewing area for plane spotters

Hatton has a varied collection of industrial buildings providing ancillary services to Heathrow Airport. The east of Hatton is noisy due to aircraft frequently landing or taking off and at Myrtle Avenue there is a well-cut green for plane spotters.

== Amenities and economy ==
=== Hatton Green ===
This has pub-restaurant "The Green Man", owned by the Punch Taverns. Adjoining the Green Man is a field where horses, geese, cows and other livestock live: Hounslow Urban Farm next to Hatton Cemetery. It states itself to be the largest "urban" farm in London. Apart from the remaining kernel of Hounslow Heath, the Borough is highly built up or in public parks, having modest average garden size. A few "rural" farms are in London, mainly in the lowest population density part: Bromley – in the North Downs.

=== Hatton Cross (the Cross) ===
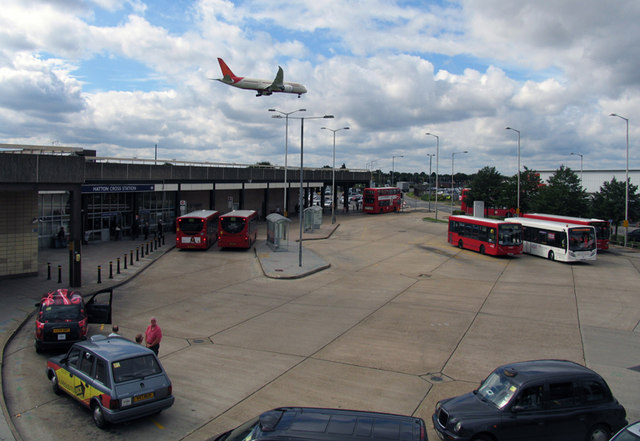
Hatton Cross tube and bus station

Hatton has a small café by the green on Faggs Road and a convenience store and newsagents within Hatton Cross station. Barclays Bank with car park is in the highly road-dominated zone north of the Cross. A petrol station with Subway food outlet faces the south-west of the Cross and The Atrium, a large hotel facing a restricted-access lane also faces the Cross. In what was once squarely but is today the debatable south of Hatton a 24-hour Tesco supermarket and petrol station adjoining the urban farm. Hatton no longer has a place of worship; its Baptist Chapel/Anglican Mission Room was converted for office use in 2000. What little housing exists is mainly semi-detached or maisonettes built between the 1930s and the 1950s. Several older properties remain in Green Man Lane, including the old Manor house (now the headquarters of a car leasing company) and two other 18th century dwellings. The 17th century blacksmith's yard and buildings have been converted into a family home.

Air France-KLM's head office for United Kingdom and Ireland operations, which includes facilities for both, is at Plesman House in Hatton Cross. Its inauguration was on 6 July 2006, having moved from Hammersmith. The Plesman House, outside of Terminal 4 of Heathrow Airport, has the UK commercial team, sales team, and support team.

East of Hatton is a large lake, which used to be a sand and gravel quarry. It is over 500 metres long, but divided by a new road, The Causeway.

== History ==
In 1086 Roger de Montgomery, Earl of Arundel, held 1 1/2 hides in Hatton, which in the reign of King Edward the Confessor had been held by two sokemen, vassals of Albert of Lorraine. This land belonged to the earl's manor of Colham, in which it probably became merged. A second entry in the Domesday Survey relates to a still smaller estate in Hatton, which was held by Walter Fitz Other, and which had been held formerly by two vassals of Azor. It is probable that this land became merged in the Windsor Manor of East Bedfont, and was possibly granted to Hounslow Priory with the rest of that property. The priory certainly held land in Hatton in 1382, and in 1599 it was granted, as land formerly belonging to Hounslow, to Sir Michael Stanhope, and from that time descended with the manor of East Bedfont.

Edward III of England seems to have built a house at Hatton, which was known as Hatton Grange. Richard II held this of the priory of Hounslow at a yearly rent of 50 shillings (£2 1/2).

In 1911, the hamlet of Hatton lay in the level country to the east of Staines upon Thames 2 miles to the northeast of East Bedfont. Its street formed a convergence of byways radiating from the south toward the Staines Road from the other side towards the parallel Bath Road, and for this reason it is said to have been a favourite haunt (ground) of highwaymen. It was always buffered, east, by the gorse, dry grass, brambles and silver birches of Hounslow Heath, and both main roads were easily accessible from the old inn, The Green Man where the hiding-hole behind the chimney is evident.

Two fairs, held respectively about 7 May at Bedford and 14 June at Hatton, were abolished by the Home Secretary on the representation (petitioning) of the Justices of the Peace (local magistrates) in April 1881. It does not appear how long it had been the custom to hold them.

There was in 1911 a Baptist chapel in Hatton, and a licensed mission room of the Church of England.

In 2008, British Airways Flight 38 crashed just short of the south runway upon landing after passing over Hatton's Myrtle Avenue and the A30 at Heathrow's southern perimeter.

=== Lost features ===
==== North of the Great South West Road (built 1900s) ====
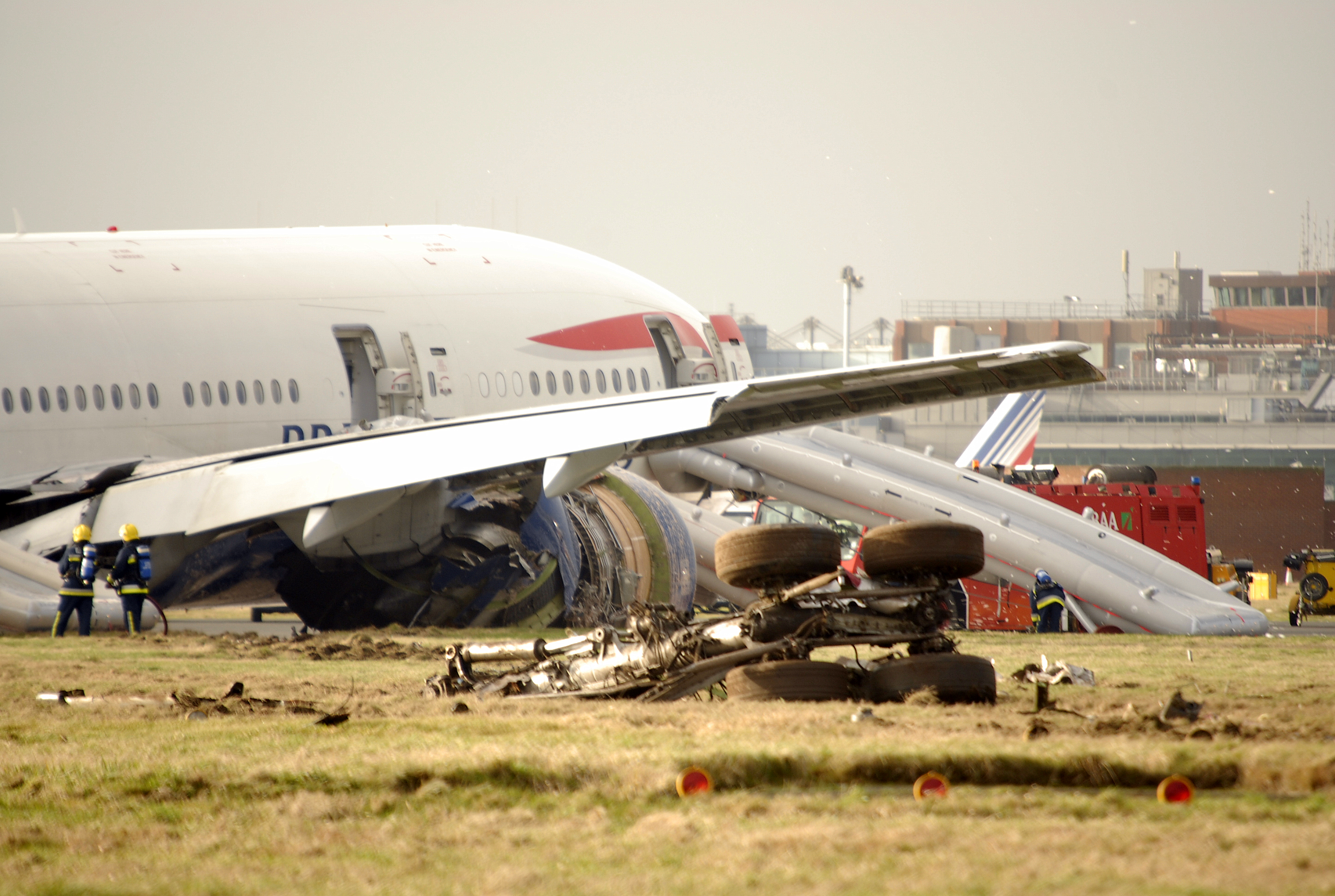
British Airways Flight 38 on the site of crash-landing

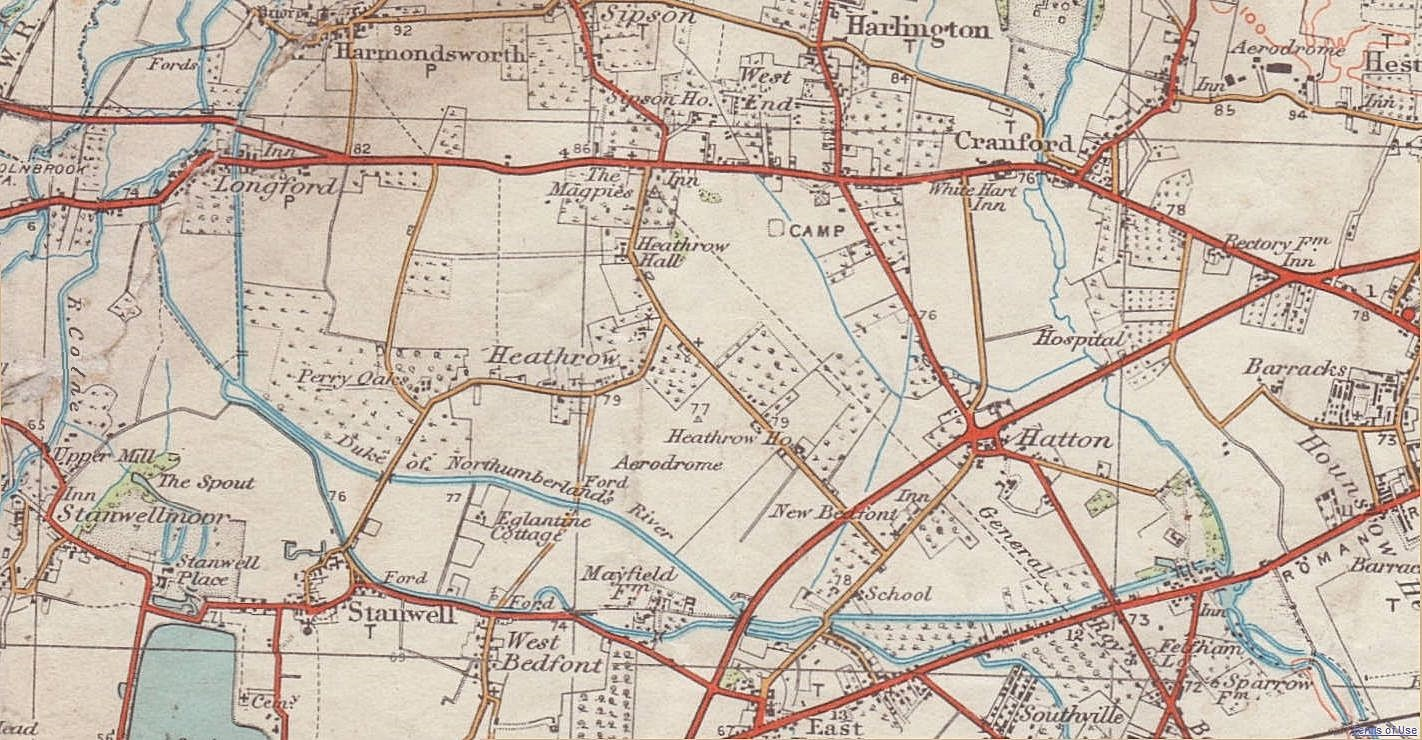
Click to view wider area, in 1930s.
Hatton shown during the early 20th century. The road running east-west (thus through what was the heart of the hamlet) was first widened in about 1935. The junction is today known as Hatton Cross.

As London Heathrow Airport has grown, its eastern estates including car parks and a hotel on the Bath Road occupy a large minority of Hatton's land — all of Hatton north of the A30 road (Great South-West Road). Other than this – Staines Road of Roman origin traditionally marking the south border – the local main street ran NNW to Harlington Corner. It thus united the A4 road Bath Road with the Staines (Silchester & Lands End) Road) before they joined in Hounslow. See A437. Features along were, from north to south:

- The Limes: a large house, east side. Built around 1840.
- The Cedars: a large house, east side. An old photograph shows a big pond in front of it and cedars round it; it faced north. Charles Dickens was a friend of the resident family, that of Mary Ann Cooper (née Mitton), and sometimes visited. She was the inspiration for his character Little Dorrit. Built around 1840. Now car parks in line with the north runway.
- Hatton Road Farm: west of Hatton Road, roughly in an equilateral triangle with The Cedars and Hatton Gore.
- Hatton Gore: a large house, east side, its site is part of the truck depot west of the perimeter road's Enfield Road Roundabout. It had a large garden and was not square to the road. It incorporated much york stone of an old guise of the Bank of England. The famous plant collector Frank Kingdon-Ward moved to Hatton Gore in 1923. He built its garden's grand rockery looking like a bend in a river ravine in the Himalayas. He sold the house due to a loss that he made running a plant nursery business. Built around 1840.
- The Common: a farm, west side
- The Dog and Partridge: pub, west side
- The Cyclist's Rest: east side, a snack shop; it used to be a beerhouse The Magpies
  - Various smaller houses and cottages were between these houses.

These buildings were demolished in or before 1949. Hatton Road survives as a north end stump (Hatton Road North), then is airside: where remnant traces are surface tarmac and wide cropmark on grass east of the north runway, unnamed gaps between aircraft-maintenance/service buildings, the south part of Eastchurch Road, and a southern stump.

==== South of the Great South West Road ====
- Temple Hatton, a country house in grounds east of Hatton Farm in the bend of Fagg's Road. Sir Frederick Pollock, 3rd Baronet owned and occupied it followed by his widow. In 1899 it was sold to a Roman Catholic order and became an orphanage called St. Anthony's Home. In 1958 it was sold due to increasing aircraft noise. Its site is now occupied by airport-related premises (St. Anthony's Way and St. Teresa's Road).
- Steam Farm, so named because it was the first in the area to have a steam-powered plough. The sites of it and Hatton House and other buildings in the island between Fagg's Road and Dick Turpin Way and Great South West Road are now occupied by a Gategourmet works.
- Hatton Farm: had several buildings and a Mission Hall, between Great South West Road and Fagg's Road and the northwest edge of what used to be Temple Hatton. The current Google Earth view (as at April 2012) shows waste ground, the Mission Hall, and one derelict farm building with gaps in its roof.

== Transport ==
The nearest London Underground station is Hatton Cross. The area is served by a number of London Buses routes, connecting Hatton to the airport, Hounslow, Northolt, Southall, Richmond and Staines.

Free parking is possible in Hatton Lane, but the roads around Hatton are either red routes (stopping not allowed), double yellow lines, or residents' parking (other parking banned Monday to Friday 8:30 to 17:30). A few credit card-paid spaces are near the Green Man which has its own patrons' parking spaces.

For more than a century, until the 1840s' laying of major railways, stagecoaches increasingly passed locally. The changing of horses locally waned into the early twentieth century. They used the nearby-divergent road two miles north (i.e. between London and all places due west (e.g. Bristol)). They used the highway of Hatton for all places WSW such as Dorset, Devon and Cornwall.

Hatton has a depot of Ashford Luxury Coaches, whose "Windsorian" branded coaches have been used to transport members of the British royal family.

The Hatton Cross Roundabout is a ring junction made up of five mini roundabouts connected pentagonally by two-way roads, similar to the Swindon Magic Roundabout.
