= Frank Kingdon-Ward =

British botanist (1885–1958)

- Born: Francis Kingdon Ward; 6 November 1885; Withington, Lancashire, England
- Died: 8 April 1958 (aged 72)
- Resting place: Grantchester, England
- Occupations: Botanist, explorer, plant collector and author
- Spouses: Florinda Norman-Thompson (m. 1923), Jean Macklin (m. 1947)
- Relatives: Harry Marshall Ward and Selina Mary Ward
- Writing career
- Genre: Natural history
- Subject: Plants
- Notable work: On the Road to Tibet

Francis Kingdon-Ward, born Francis Kingdon Ward OBE, (6 November 1885 in Withington, Lancashire – 8 April 1958) was an English botanist, explorer, plant collector and author. He published most of his books as Frank Kingdon-Ward and this hyphenated form of his name stuck, becoming the surname of his wives and two daughters.

== Biography ==
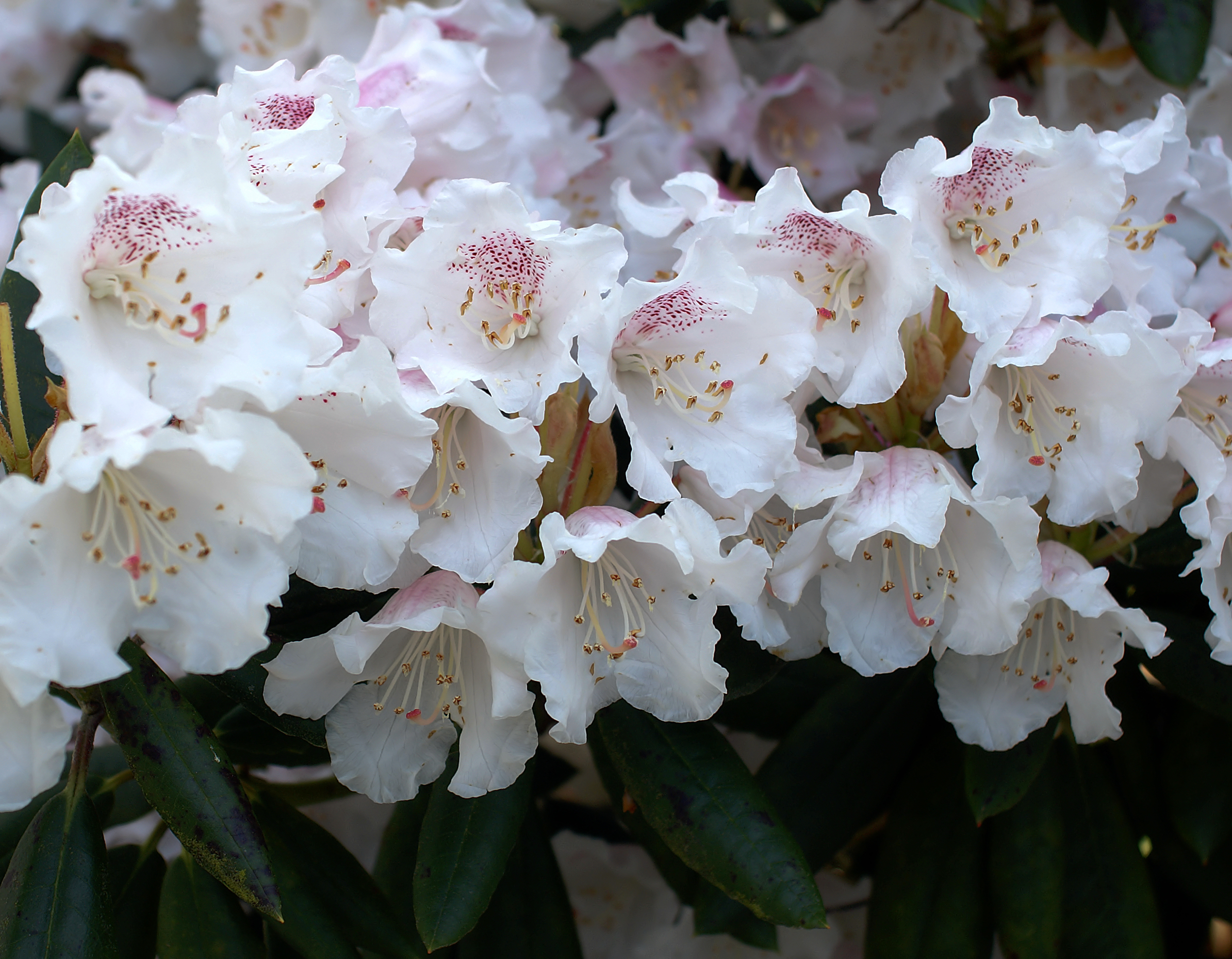
Rhododendron wardii var. puralbum, a naturally occurring white-flowered variety of the yellow-flowered species named for Frank Kingdon-Ward

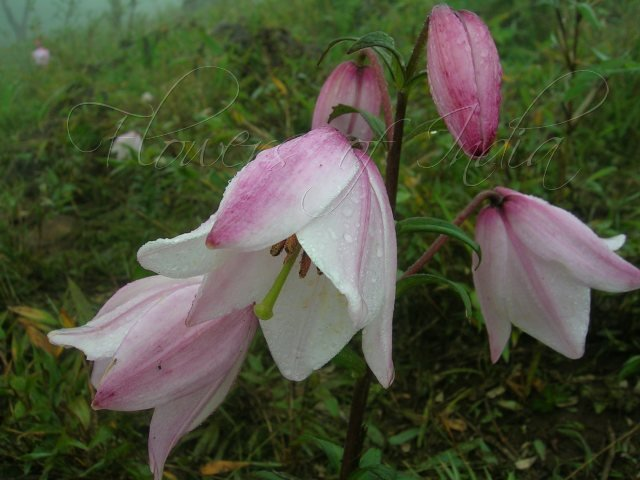
Shirui lily, Lilium mackliniae

Son of Harry Marshall Ward and Selina Mary Ward, née Kingdon; he went on around 25 expeditions over a period of nearly fifty years, exploring Tibet, North Western China, Myanmar and Assam (in Northeastern India). In Myanmar he met and conducted some research into forestry and plants in the country with native botanist Chit Ko Ko. Among his collections were the first viable seed of Meconopsis betonicifolia (Himalayan blue poppy, first discovered by Pére Delavay), Primula florindae (giant cowslip, named after his first wife Florinda, née Norman-Thompson) and Rhododendron wardii, a yellow flowered species.

A species of Asian lizard, Pseudocalotes kingdonwardi, is named in his honor. He is also commemorated in Ward's trogon, Harpactes wardi.

He survived many accidents on his expeditions including hunger, extreme weather, slope slides and cliffhangers, becoming lost, roughing it with little shelter, altercations with indigenous Asians, and impalement. During an expedition in Assam, he was close to the epicentre of an earthquake (registering 8.6 on the Richter magnitude scale) on 15 August 1950.

In 1923 he moved to Hatton Gore, a big house on the east side of Hatton Road, Hatton, London; the site of the house is now under the east end of London Heathrow Airport. He built there a big rockery looking like a bend in a river ravine in the Himalayas. He sold the house due to a loss that he made running a plant nursery business.

He was married twice, first to Florinda Norman-Thompson on 11 April 1923; later, to Jean Macklin, on 12 November 1947, to whom he remained married until his death.

Florinda Kingdon-Ward had a brief political career which included standing as a Liberal Party candidate for Parliament at the 1950 UK General Election in Lewes.

Even towards the end of his career he was still active, his greatest "swansong" plant was probably Lilium mackliniae, found jointly with his second wife after whom it is named. At age 68 he climbed to over 1,730–2,590 metres (5,680–8,500 ft) above sea level in the Ukhrul district of Manipur, India (near the boundary of Myanmar to the east) and was still discovering new species of plants on his last expedition in 1956, including Roscoea australis, the most southerly representative of its genus.

He was made an Officer of the Order of the British Empire in 1952.

Frank Kingdon-Ward died on 8 April 1958 aged 72. He had suffered a stroke and went into a coma from which he never recovered. He was buried in the churchyard at Grantchester.

His name became a pen name for his sister Winifred Mary Ward by default.

== Published works ==
He wrote 25 books, mostly accounts of his expeditions. The titles, dates and publishers are as follows:

- On the Road to Tibet (1910) Shanghai Mercury Ltd. Shanghai
- Land of the Blue Poppy (1913) Cambridge University Press
- In Farthest Burma (1921) Seeley Service and Co (reprinted by Orchid Press, Thailand; 2nd rev edition (Jan 2005) ISBN 978-974-524-062-9)
- Mystery Rivers of Tibet (1923) Seeley Service and Co (reprinted by Cadogan Books, 1986 ISBN 0-946313-52-0)
- From China to Hkamti Long (1924) Edward Arnold and Co
- The Romance of Plant Hunting (1924) Edward Arnold and Co
- Riddle of the Tsangpo Gorges (1926) Edward Arnold and Co
- Rhododendrons for Everyone (1926) The Gardener's Chronicle Ltd
- Plant Hunting on the Edge of the World (1930) Victor Gollancz (reprinted 1974, Theophrastus)
- Plant Hunting in the Wilds (1931) Figurehead (Pioneer series)
- The Loom of the East (1932) Martin Hopkinson Ltd
- A Plant Hunter in Tibet (1934) Jonathan Cape (reprinted by White Orchid, Thailand (2006) ISBN 978-974-524-087-2)
- The Romance of Gardening (1935) Jonathan Cape
- Plant Hunter's Paradise (1937) Jonathan Cape
- Assam Adventure (1941) Jonathan Cape
- Modern Exploration (1945) Jonathan Cape
- About This Earth (1946) Jonathan Cape
- Commonsense Rock Gardening (1948) Jonathan Cape
- Burma's Icy Mountains (1949) Jonathan Cape (reprinted by White Orchid, Thailand; 2nd edition (2006) ISBN 978-974-524-084-1)
- Rhododendrons (1949) Latimer House
- Footsteps in Civilization (1950) Jonathan Cape
- Plant Hunter in Manipur (1952) Jonathan Cape
- Berried Treasure (1954) Ward Lock and Co. Ltd. London and Melbourne
- Return to the Irrawaddy (1956) Andrew Melrose
- Pilgrimage for Plants (1960) George C. Harrap and Co. Ltd

== Sources ==
- Frank Kingdon-Ward's own works, as listed above
- Frank Kingdon-Ward – Last of the Great Plant Hunters, Charles Lyte (1989), John Murray Publishers Ltd, ISBN 978-0-7195-4735-5
- Frank Kingdon-Ward, timeline of events. 1885–1958
