= Manipur =

State in northeastern India

- State
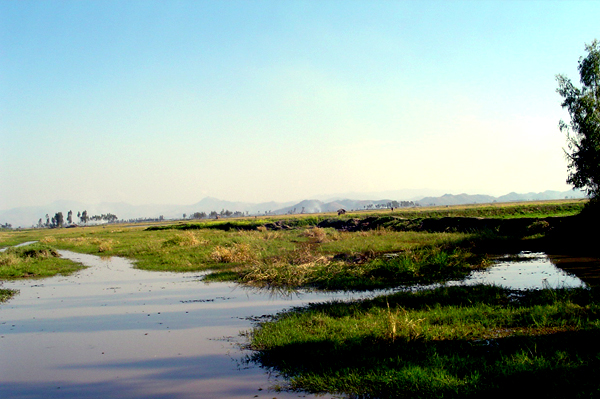
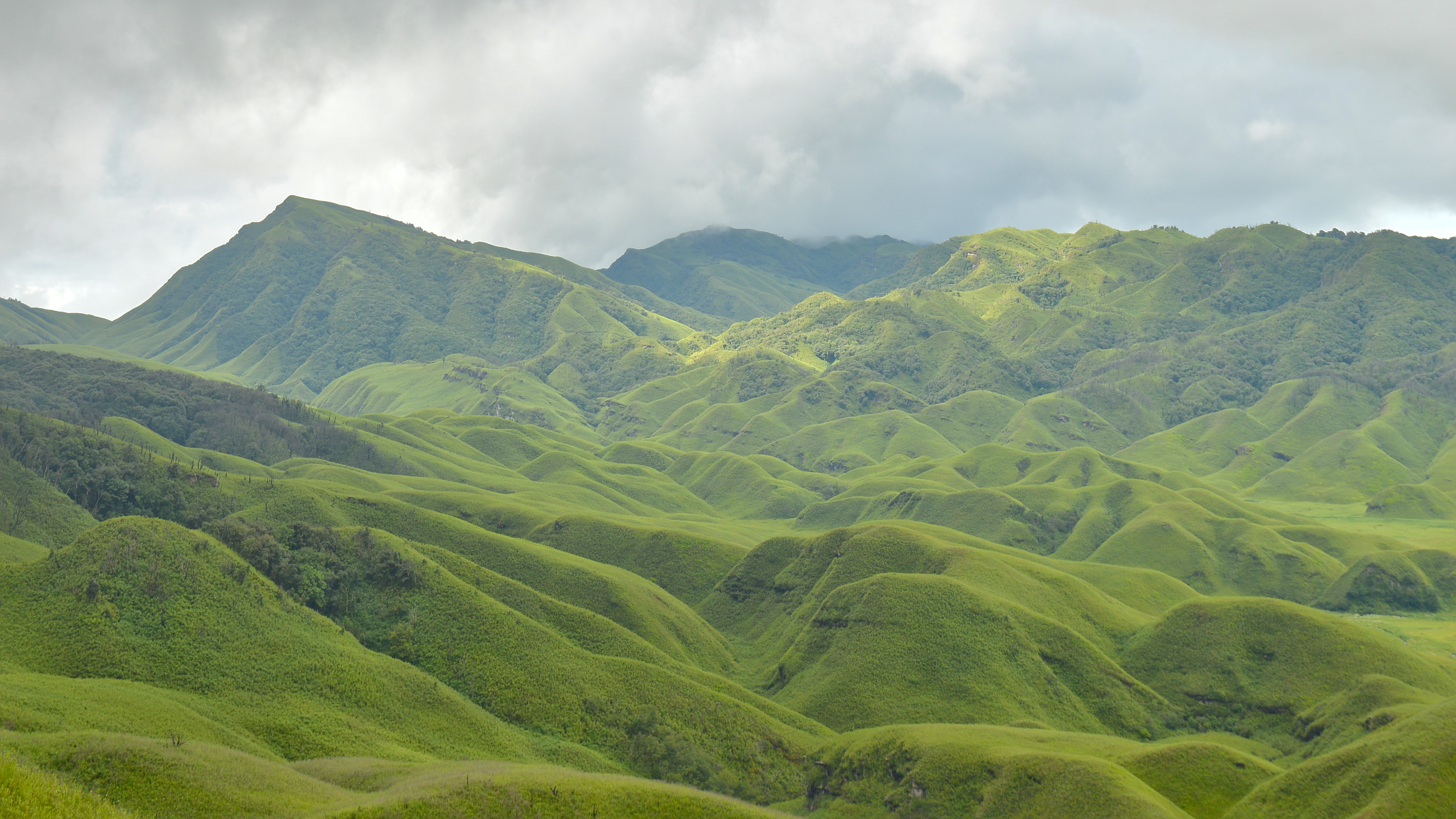
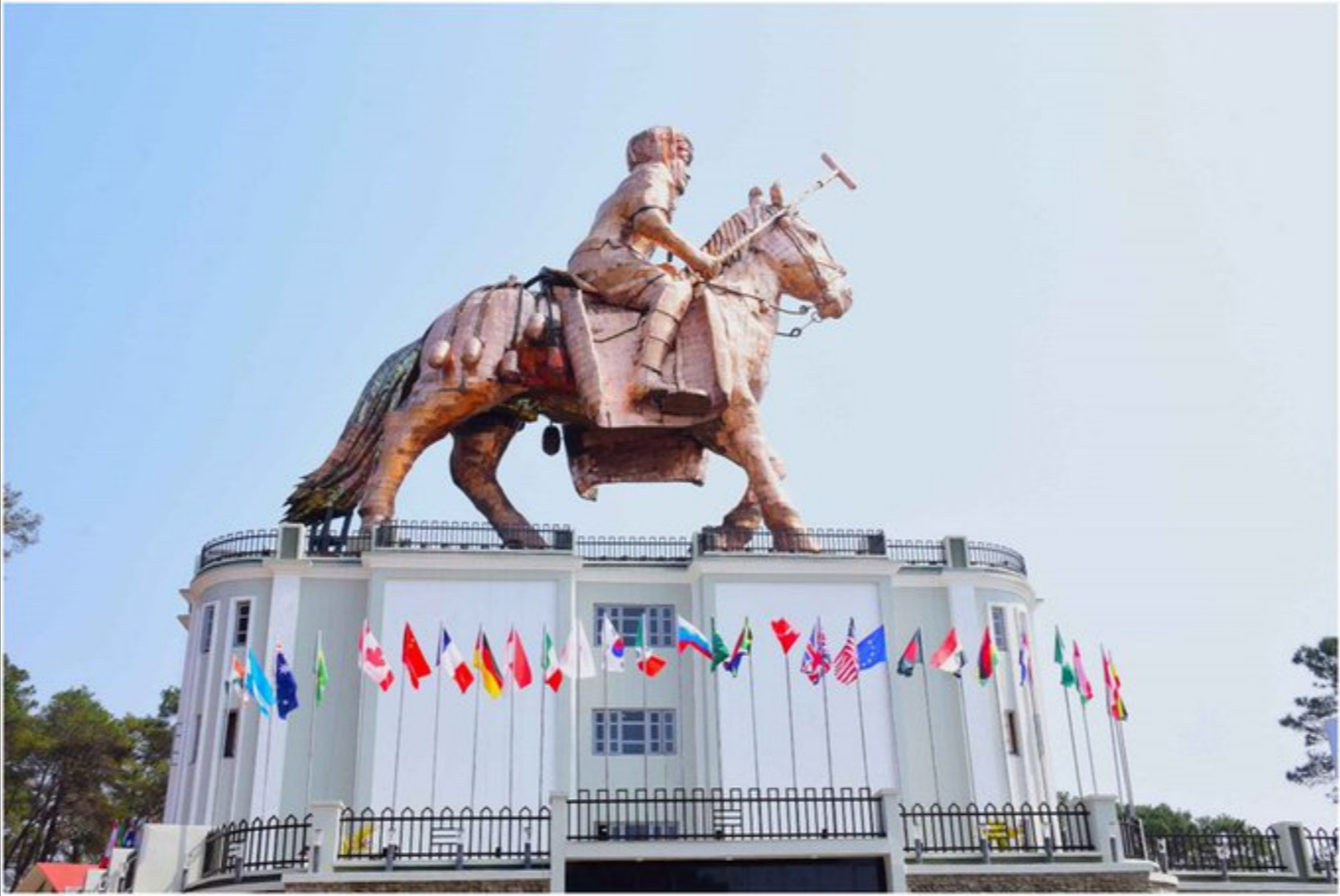
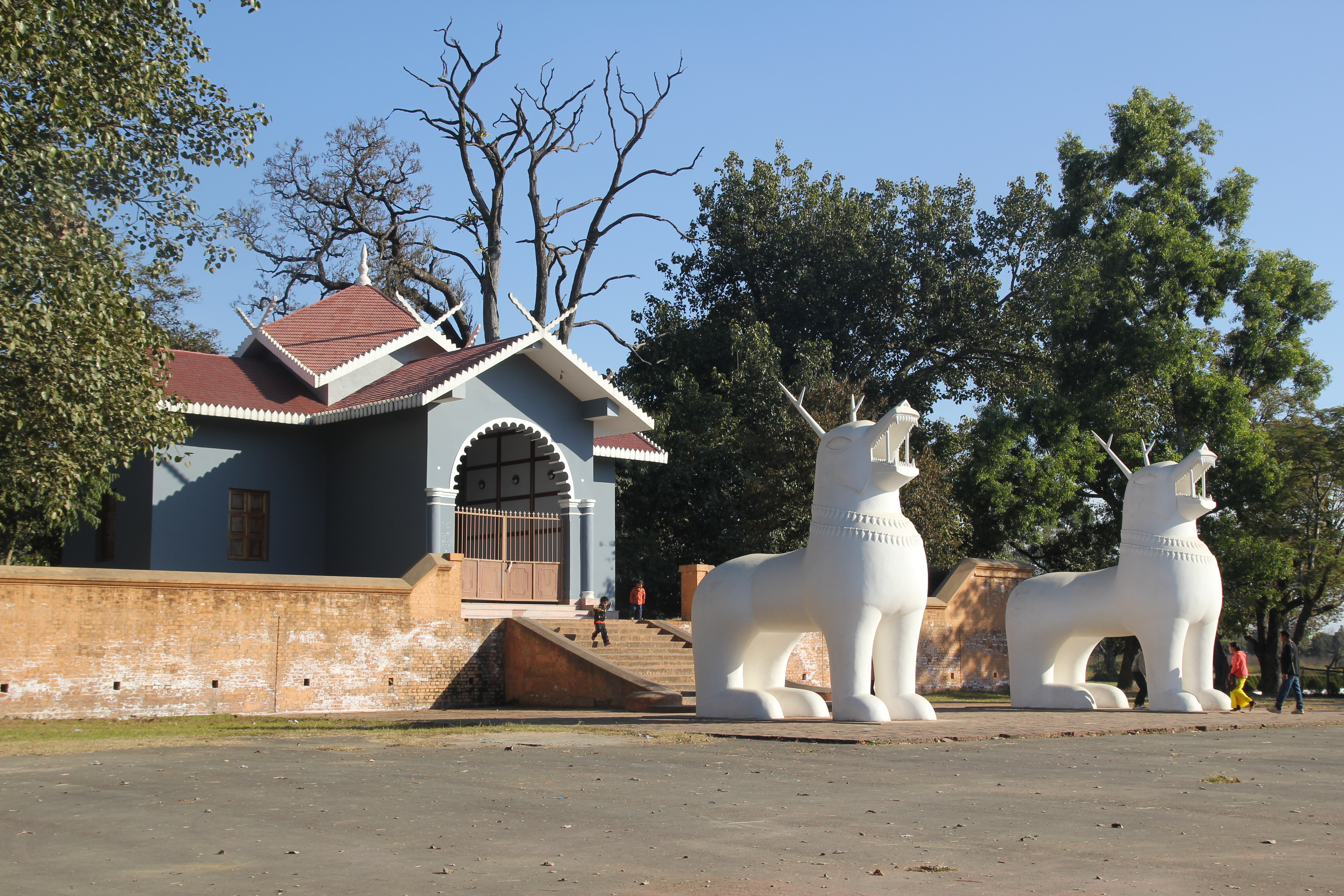
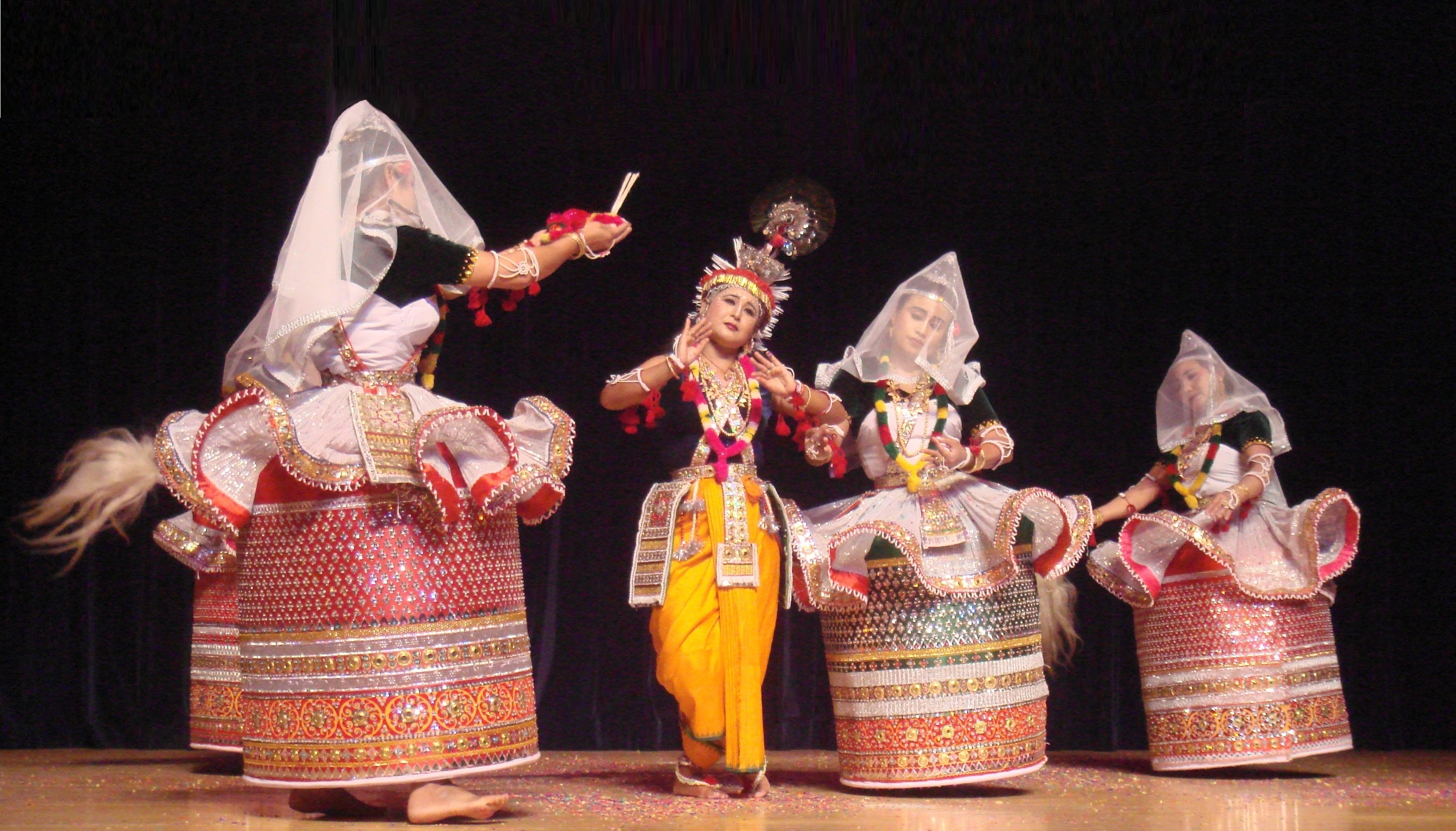
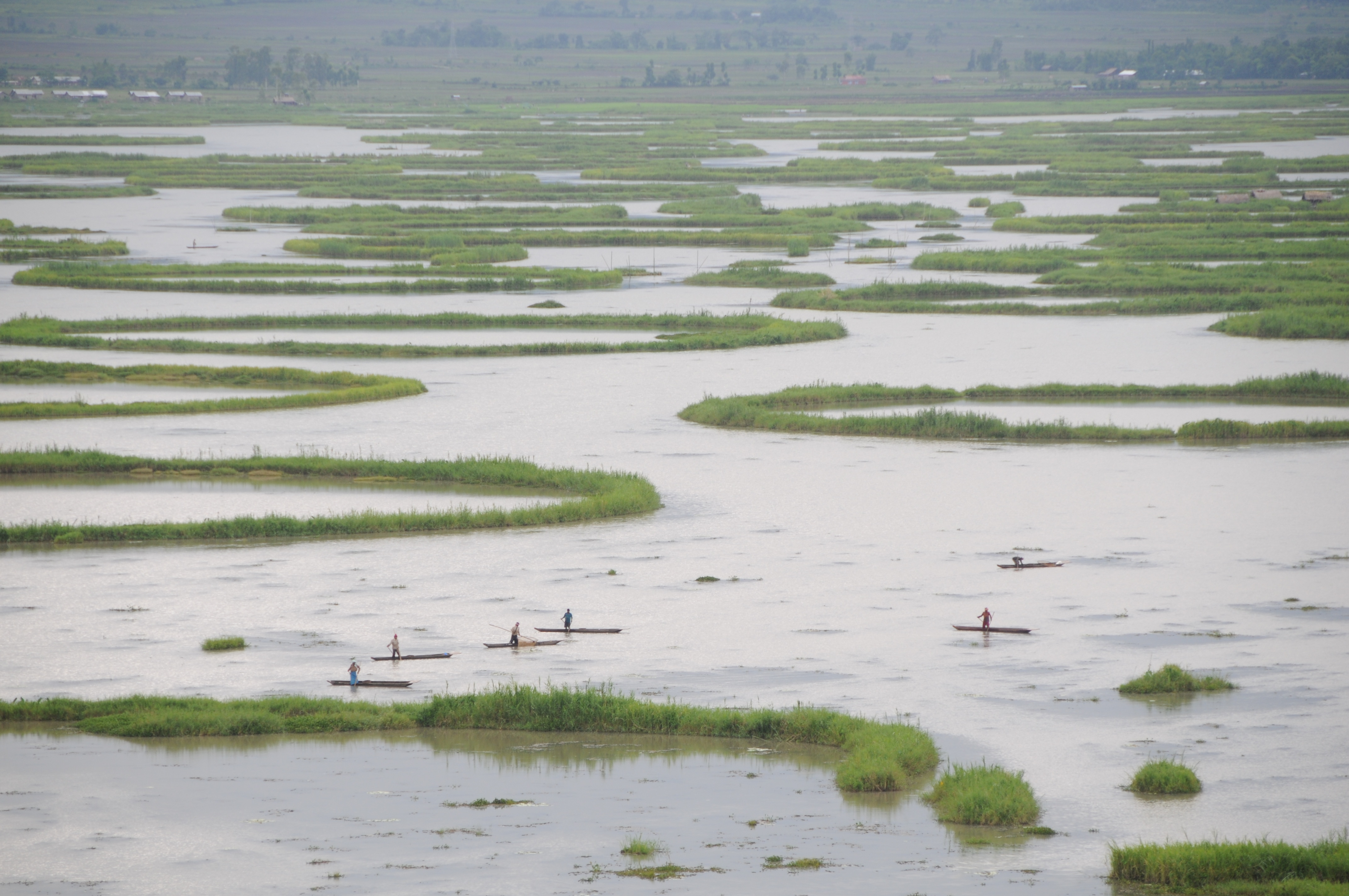
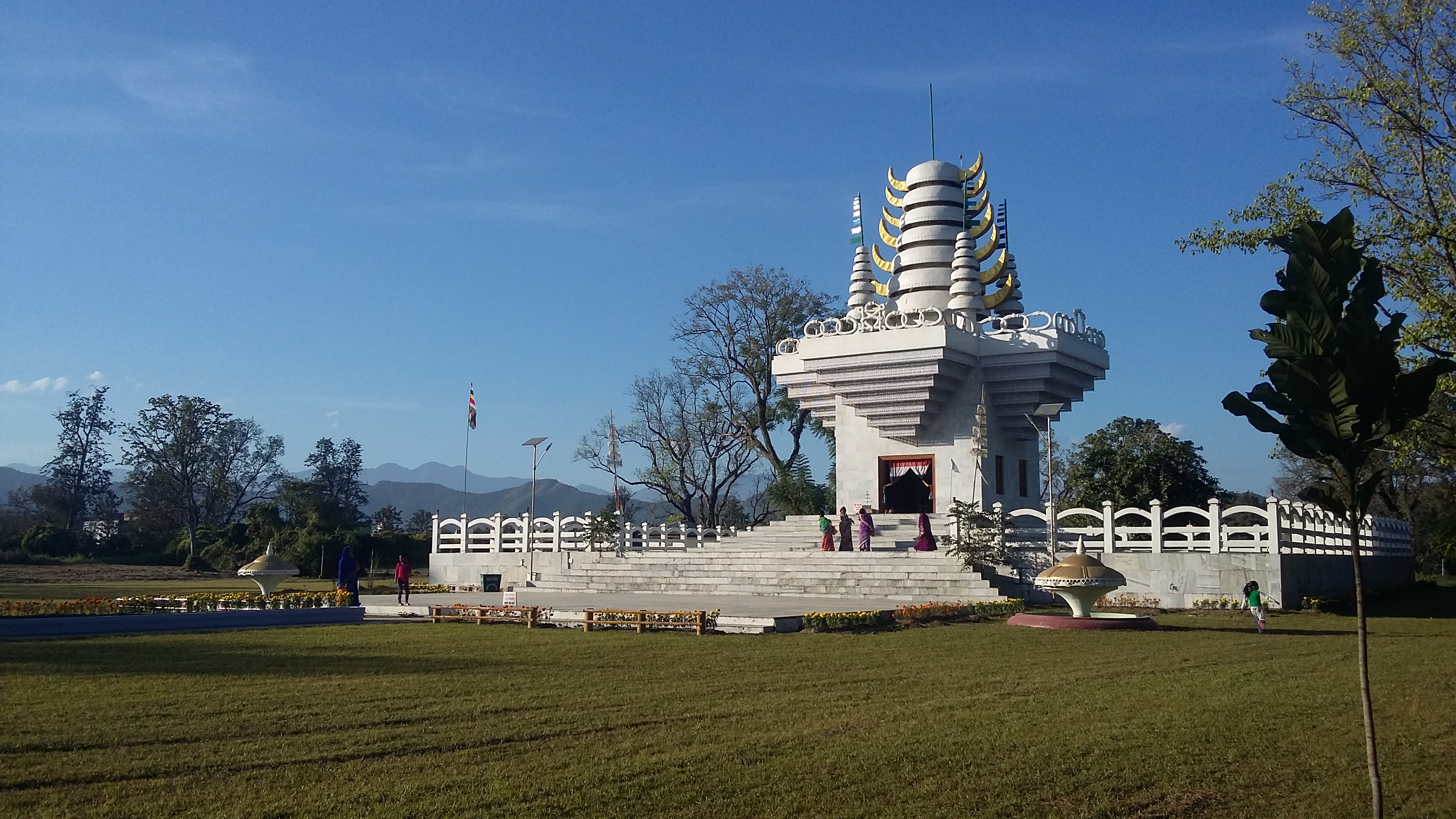
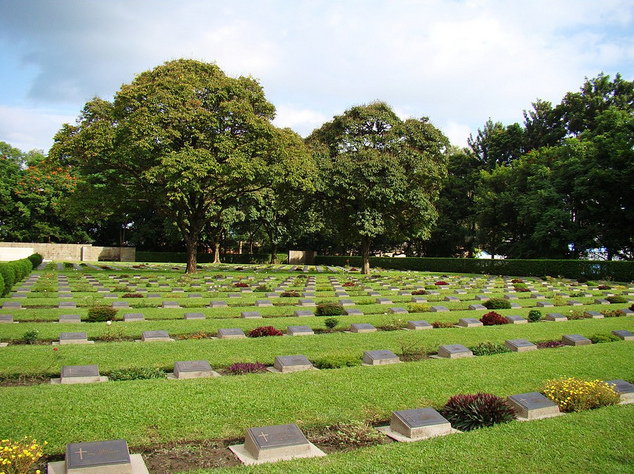
- Pumlenpat Dzüko Valley Marjing Polo Statue Dual statues of the Kanglā shā dragons Manipuri classical dance Loktak lake Temple of Pakhangba inside the Kangla Fort Imphal War Cemetery

- Emblem of Manipur
- Anthem: Sanā leibāk Manipur (Meitei for 'Manipur, Land of Gold')
- Location of Manipur in India
- Coordinates: 24.81°N 93.94°E
- Country: India
- Region: Northeast India
- Previously was: Manipur Kingdom
- Admission to union: 15 October 1949
- As union territory: 1 November 1956
- As state: 21 January 1972
- Capital and largest city: Imphal
- Districts: 16

Government
  - Body: Government of Manipur
  - Governor: Ajay Kumar Bhalla
  - Chief Minister: Y. Khemchand Singh (BJP)
  - Deputy Chief Minister: Nemcha Kipgen (BJP); Losii Dikho (NPF)

Area
  - Total: 22,327 km^{2} (8,621 sq mi)
  - Rank: 23rd
- Highest elevation (Mount Tempü): 2,994 m (9,823 ft)
- Lowest elevation (Barak River): 140 m (460 ft)

Population (2011)
  - Total: 2,855,794
  - Rank: 23rd
  - Density: 130/km^{2} (340/sq mi)
  - Urban: 30.21%
  - Rural: 69.79%

Language
  - Official: Meitei (Manipuri)
  - Official script: Meitei script

GDP
  - Total (2026–27): ▲₹68,823 crore (US$7.4 billion) (nominal) ▲ ~US$33.65 billion (PPP)
  - Rank: 28th
  - Per capita: ▲₹153,993 (US$1,600) (nominal) (2024–25) ▲ ~US$7,575 (PPP) (27th)
- Time zone: UTC+05:30 (IST)
- ISO 3166 code: IN-MN
- Vehicle registration: MN
- HDI (2022): ▲0.683 medium (17th)
- Literacy (2024): 92.0% (10th)
- Sex ratio (2011): 985♀/1000 ♂
- Website: manipur.gov.in
- Symbols of Manipur
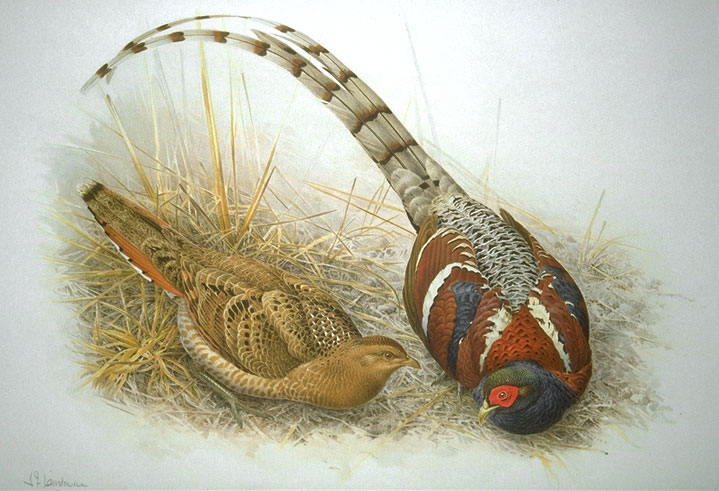
- Bird: Nongin (Meitei for 'Syrmaticus humiae')

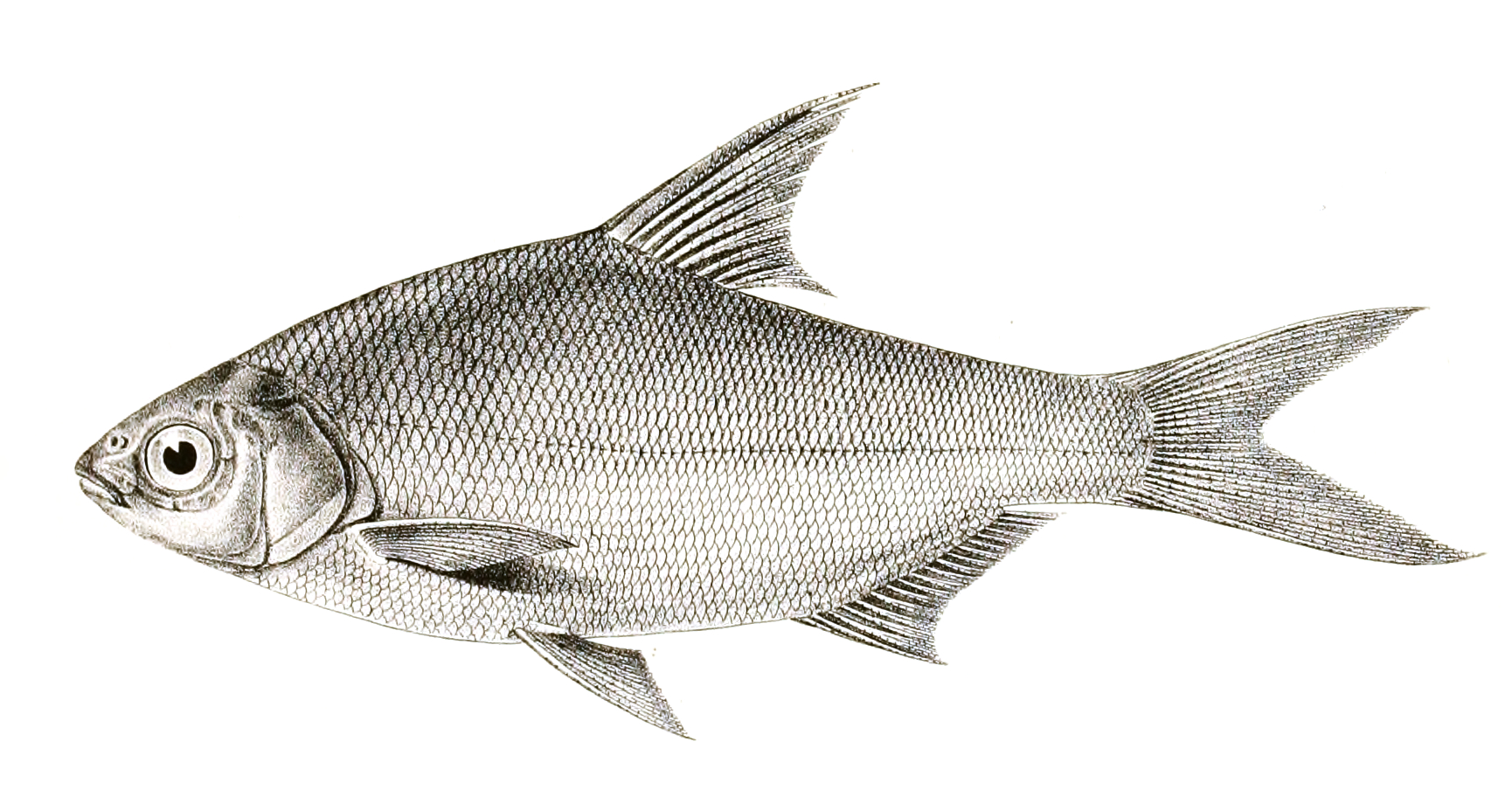
- Fish: Pengba (Meitei for 'Osteobrama belangeri')

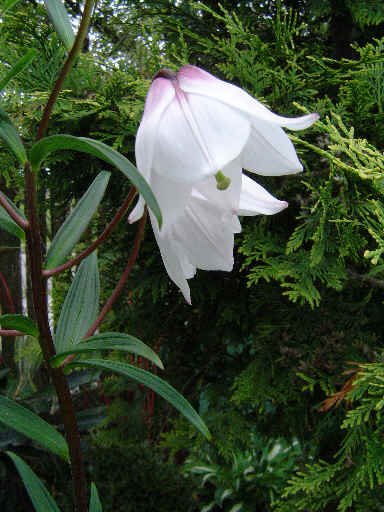
- Flower: Shirui lily (Lilium mackliniae)

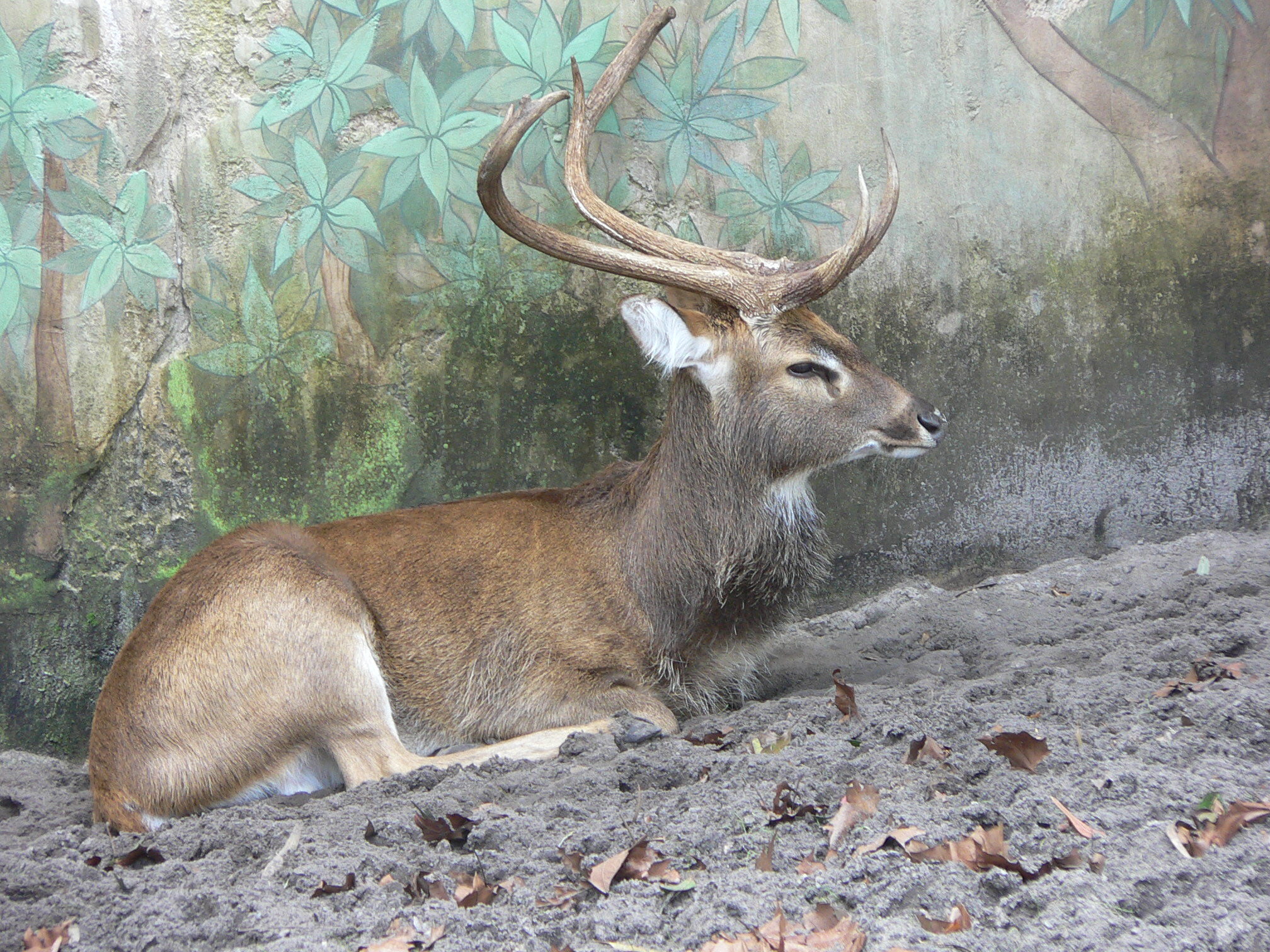
- Mammal: Sangai (Meitei for 'Cervus eldi eldi')

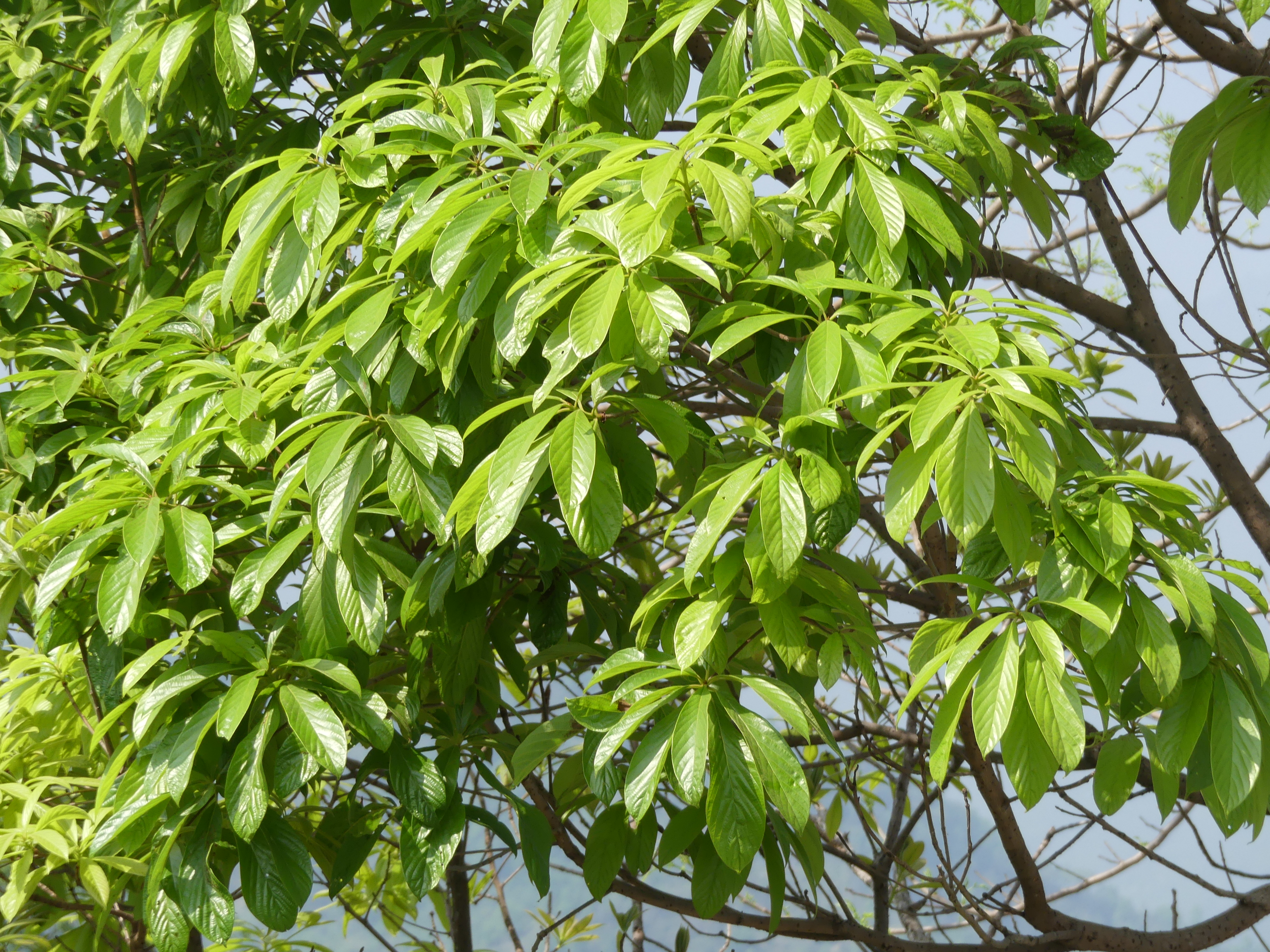
- Tree: Uningthou (Meitei for 'Phoebe hainesiana')
- State highway mark
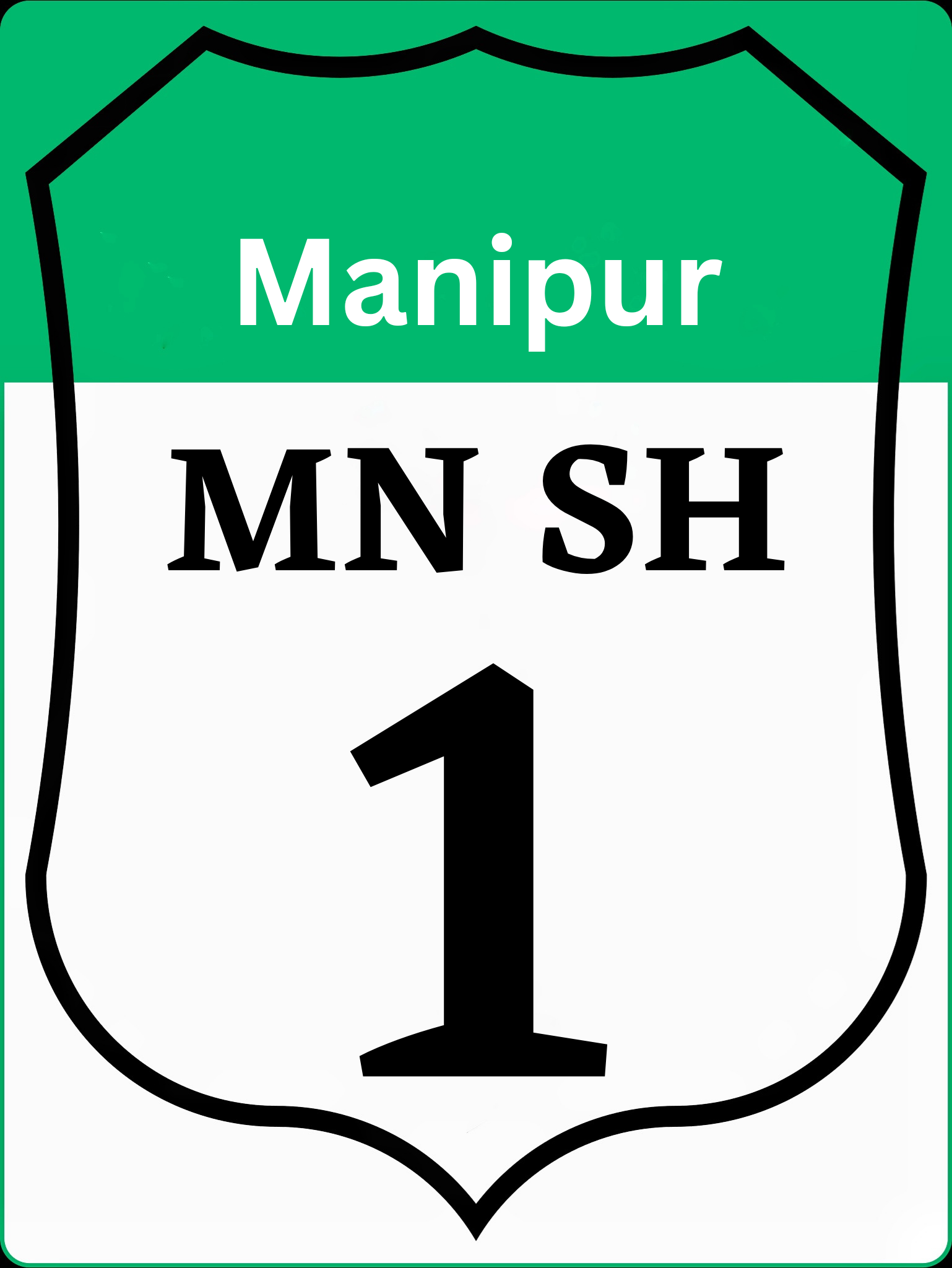
- State highway of Manipur
- List of Indian state symbols

Manipur (/ˌmænɪˈpʊər/, IPA: [məɳiˈpʊɾ]) is a state in northeastern India, with Imphal as its capital city. It borders the Indian states of Assam to the west, Mizoram to the south, and Nagaland to the north and shares the international border with Myanmar, specifically the Sagaing Region to the east and Chin State to the southeast. Covering an area of 22,330 square kilometers (8,621 sq mi), the state consists mostly of hilly terrain with the 1813-square-kilometre (700 sq mi) Imphal Valley inhabited by the Meitei (Manipuri) community, historically a kingdom. Surrounding hills are home to Naga and Kuki-Zo communities, who speak Tibeto-Burman languages. The official language and lingua franca, Meitei (Manipuri), also belongs to the Tibeto-Burman family.

During the days of the British Raj, Manipur was one of the princely states. Prior to the British departure in 1947, Manipur acceded to the Dominion of India, along with 550 other princely states approximately. 1949, the ruler of Manipur signed a merger agreement with India, giving up the rule of the kingdom and obtaining a privy purse in return. Many Meitei people feel that their self-determination was violated by the agreement since the legislature elected under the constitution was not consulted. Ethnic and separatist concerns have resulted in a long-running insurgency against Indian rule. From 2009 through 2018, the conflict was responsible for the violent deaths of over 1000 people.

The Meitei people represent around 53% of the population of Manipur state, followed by various Naga tribes at 20% and Kuki-Zo tribes at 16%. Manipur's ethnic groups practice a variety of religions. According to 2011 census, Hinduism and Christianity are the major religions of the state.

Manipur has primarily an agrarian economy, with significant hydroelectric power generation potential. It is connected to other areas by daily flights through Imphal Airport, the second largest in northeastern India. Manipur is home to many sports and the origin of Manipuri dance, and is credited with introducing polo to Europeans.

== Name ==
The name Manipur (Sanskrit: मणिपुर, romanized: maṇipura, lit. ''city of jewels'') was chosen by Gharib Nawaz in the eighteenth century. It is named after a kingdom of the same name mentioned in the Mahabharata Hindu epic. Previously, it had been known as Kangleipak (Meitei: ꯀꯪꯂꯩꯄꯛ) or Meiteileipak (ꯃꯩꯇꯩꯂꯩꯕꯥꯛ, 'land of the Meiteis'). Later, the work Dharani Samhita (1825–34) popularised the Sanskrit legends of the origin of Manipur's name.

Other names include Sanaleibak (Meitei: ꯁꯅꯥꯂꯩꯕꯥꯛ, lit. 'the land of gold'), not given because Manipur has a lot of the gold mines, but because of its happiness and prosperity. This name was mentioned in the 11th-12th century constitution, the Loiyumba Shinyen,^{10} and is still heard in the official song of Manipur, "Sana Leibak Manipur".

== History ==
=== Antiquity ===
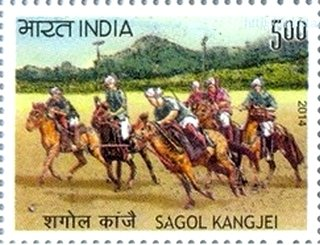
A match of Sagol Kangjei (Meitei for 'Polo') depicted in a stamp of the Republic of India

The history of Manipur Meiteis is chronicled in Puyas or Puwaris (stories about the forefathers), namely, the Ninghthou Kangbalon, Cheitharol Kumbaba, Ningthourol Lambuba, Poireiton Khunthokpa, Panthoibi Khongkul, and so forth in the Meitei script, which is comparable to the Thai script. The historical accounts presented here were recordings from the eyes and the judgment of Meitei kings and Maichou (Meitei scholars).

==== The Kingdoms of Möng Kawng and Möng Mao ====
According to the Tai chronicles, Manipur (Kahse) is one of the territories conquered by Sam Lông Hpa (1150–1201), the first Chao Pha of Möng Kawng. A 14th-century inscription from Pagan, Myanmar, mentions Kasan (Manipur) as one of the 21 states under the Mong Mao ruler Thonganbwa (1413–1445/6); he later was captured by the Governor of Taungdwingyi.

=== Medieval ===
==== Vassal State of the Toungoo empire ====
Bayinnaung, the ruler of Toungoo dynasty ordered the invasion of Manipur in 1559. He had recalled Binnya Dala from Chiang Mai to lead the invasion. The three armies mostly made up of army from Kale, Mohnyin, Mogaung, Momeik and Sanda led the invasion, the King of Manipur surrendered without any resistance and Manipur became a vassal state of the Toungoo empire.

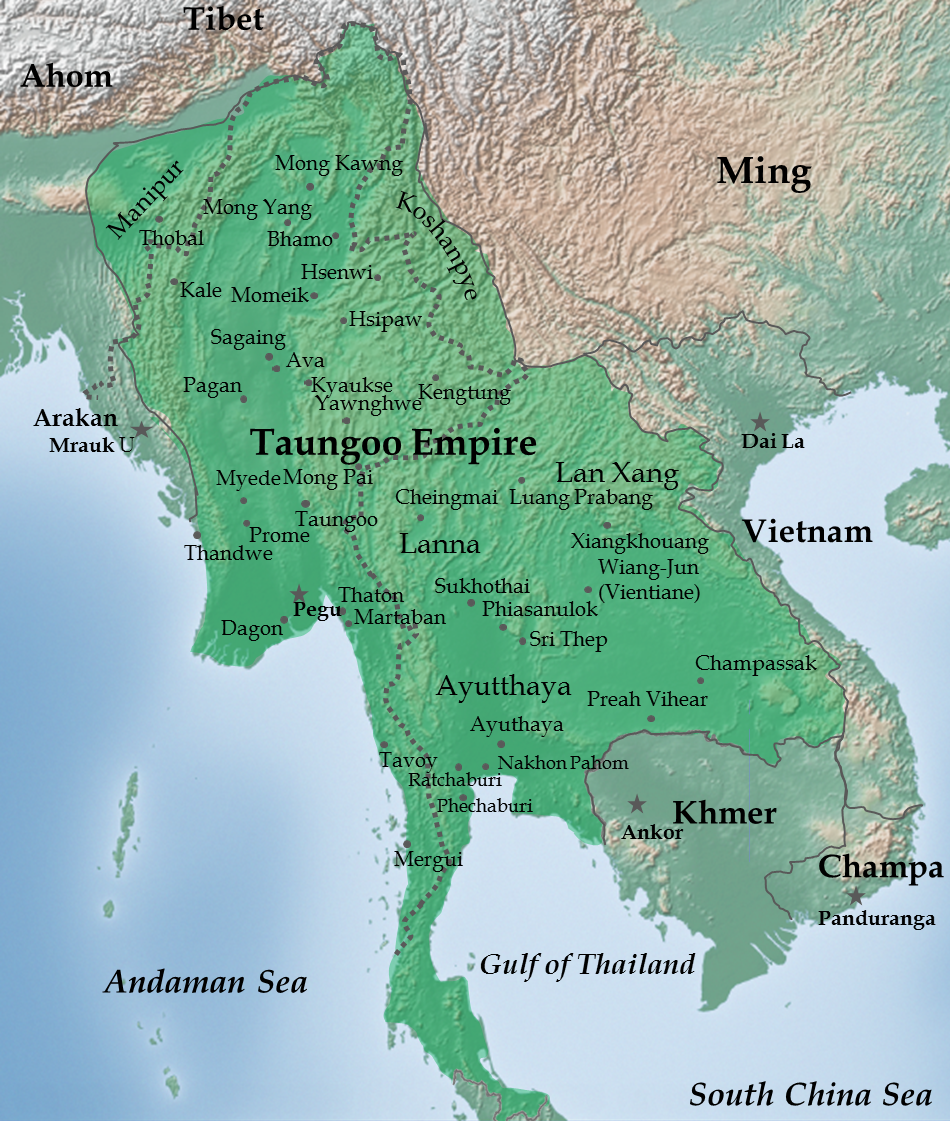
Toungoo empire in 1580

==== Vassal state of Konbaung dynasty ====
In the 18th century, Bodawpaya, the king of Burma annexed Manipur (1814) along with the western kingdoms of Arakan (1784), Assam (1817).

By the medieval period, marriage alliances between the royal families of Manipur, Ahom kingdom and Burma had become common. Medieval era manuscripts discovered in the 20th century, particularly the Puya, provide evidence that Hindus from the Indian subcontinent had married Manipur royalty by at least the 14th century. In centuries thereafter, royal spouses came also from what is now Assam, Bengal, and Uttar Pradesh and from other South Indian kingdoms as well. Another manuscript suggests that Muslims arrived in Manipur in the 17th century, from what is now Bangladesh, during the reign of Meidingu Khagemba. The socio-political turmoil and wars, particularly the persistent and devastating Anglo-Burmese wars, affected the cultural and religious demography of Manipur.

=== British colonial period ===
In 1824, the ruler of Manipur entered into a subsidiary alliance with the British Empire in the Indian subcontinent, which became responsible for Manipur's external defence. The British recognised that the state remained internally self-governing, as a princely state. During World War II, Manipur was the scene of many fierce battles between Japanese invaders and British Indian forces. The Japanese were beaten back before they could enter Imphal, which was one of the turning points of the overall war in South Asia. The Battle of Imphal, known to the Manipuris as Japan Laan, are among the lesser-known battles of the Second World War. Yet the Allied Victory in this battle was a turning point against the Japanese in East Asia.

=== Post-colonial history ===
After the war, the Maharaja took the advice of the British Cabinet Mission and the Chamber of Princes to introduce democratic reforms in the state. The Manipur State Constitution Act of 1947 was promulgated in July 1947 to give the state an elected legislative assembly and an appointed prime minister. Elections to the assembly were held only in the following year.

Following the decision to partition British India, all the princely states were advised to "accede" to one of the new dominions. The Maharaja acceded to India on 11 August 1947 and signed a standstill agreement to continue all the pre-existing arrangements it had with British India. Some Meitei people argue that the king was in no legal position to sign the instrument of accession at the time.

Over the next two years, the multitude of princely states of India were extensively reorganised as India moved towards becoming a constitutional republic. Proposals for reorganisation were also made for Manipur but discarded as being unsuitable. Eventually Manipur was turned into a centrally administered province (called a 'Part C' state, later renamed union territory) by asking the Maharaja to sign a merger agreement. He is believed to have signed it under duress, and without opportunity to consult the elected legislature..

As a centrally-administered province, Manipur was governed by a Chief Commissioner, as per the Constitution of India. An advisory council with nominated members was provided to advise the Chief Commissioner. In 1956, the status changed to a union territory, with a Lieutenant Governor advised by a territorial council with mostly elected members. In 1963, Manipur was provided a legislative assembly and a council of ministers headed by a chief minister. It was made a fully-fledged state in 1972 under the North-Eastern Areas (Reorganisation) Act, 1971.

=== Insurgency ===
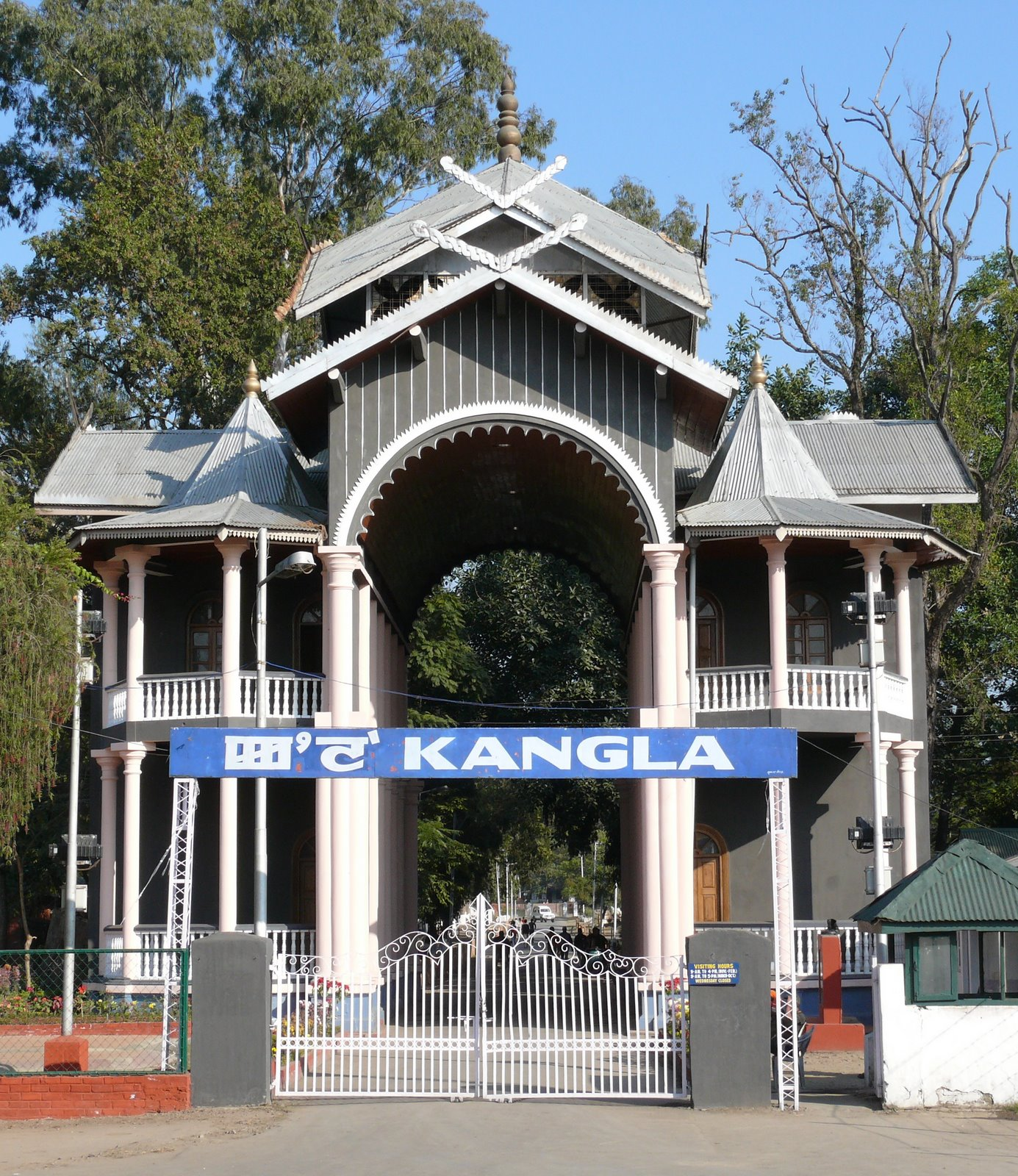
Kangla Gate, the west entrance to the Kangla Fort

The disaffection of the populace before 1972, led to armed insurgencies. The first armed opposition group, the United National Liberation Front (UNLF), was founded in 1964 demanding independence from India. Over time, more groups formed, each with a different goal, and they derived support from diverse ethnic groups in Manipur. The People's Revolutionary Party of Kangleipak (PREPAK) was formed in 1977, and the People's Liberation Army (PLA) in 1978, which were suspected to have received arms and training from China. In 1980, the Kangleipak Communist Party (KCP) was formed. These groups began a spree of bank robberies and attacks on police officers and government buildings. The state government appealed to the central government in New Delhi for support in combating this violence.

Even before the Naga-dominated hill districts of Manipur participated in the Naga insurgency driven by the Naga National Council and, later, Natiional Socialist Council of Nagaland. In the late 1980s the Kuki-Zo people started their own insurgency demanding separation from the Manipur state.

From 1980 to 2004, the Indian government referred to Manipur as a disturbed area, where the Armed Forces (Special Powers) Act (AFSPA) would operate. The law allow the military to treat private and public spaces in the same manner, detain individuals for up to 24 hours with unlimited renewals, perform warrantless searches, and shoot and kill individuals who break laws, carry weapons, or gather in groups larger than four. Legal immunity applies to the armed forces. Since 1980, the application of the AFSPA has been at the heart of concerns about human rights violations in the region, such as arbitrary killings, torture, cruel, inhuman and degrading treatment, and forced disappearances. Its continued application has led to numerous protests, notably the longstanding hunger strike by Irom Sharmila Chanu.

In 2004, the government lifted the disturbed status after a violent attack on a local woman. The rape of a Manipuri woman, Thangjam Manorama Devi, by members of the Assam Rifles paramilitary led to wide protests including a nude protest by the Meira Paibi women's association.

==== 18 June Uprising ====
On 18 June 2001, a massive protest broke out in Imphal Valley. The protest was triggered by the Government of India's decision to extend the ceasefire agreement with the NSCN-IM "without territorial limits", which was widely perceived as a threat to Manipur's territorial integrity. Demonstrators set fire to the Manipur Legislative Assembly and other government buildings in Imphal. Security forces opened fire to stop the crowds, killing 18 people.

==== 2023 Manipur violence ====
On 3 May 2023, ethnic violence broke out between Meitei people and Kuki people which led to extensive violence and arson, resulting in the displacement of 60,000 people from their homes and hundreds more dead and hospitalised. According to data released by Manipur Police, as of September 15, 2023, 175 people were killed, 1,118 people were injured, and 33 people were missing. 96 bodies remained unclaimed. 5,172 cases of arson including destruction of 4,786 houses and 386 religious places, out of which there were 254 churches and 132 temples, were reported since May. Out of 5,668 arms lost, 1,329 arms, 15,050 ammunition and 400 bombs were recovered. Indian army troops were deployed to control the situation. International outrage resulted on 20 July 2023, from a viral video that two Kuki women had been paraded naked and allegedly gang-raped by a mob of Meitei men.

== Geography ==
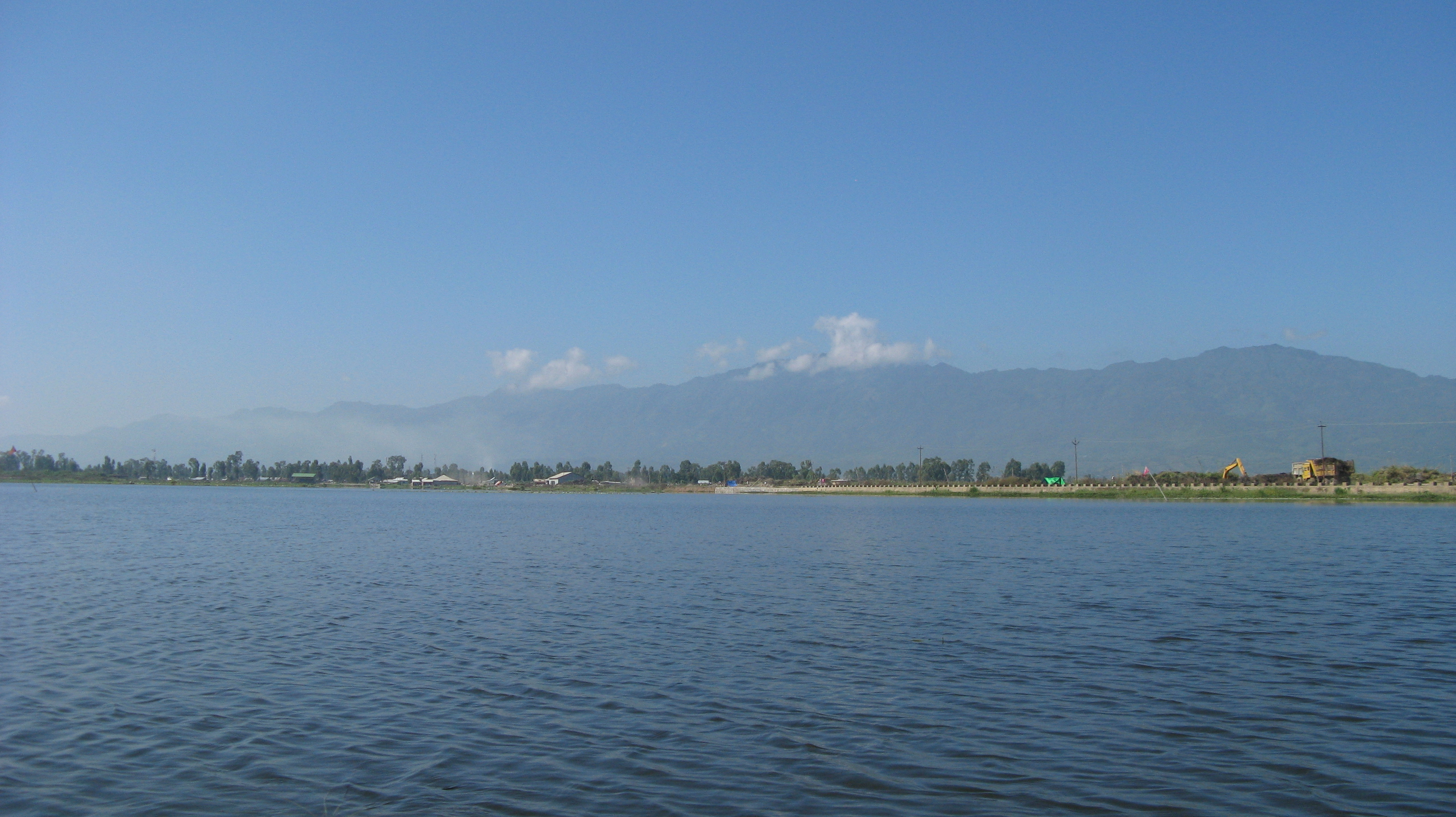
Loktak Lake, the largest fresh water lake in the state.

The state lies at a latitude of 23°83'N – 25°68'N and a longitude of 93°03'E – 94°78'E. The total area covered by the state is 22,327 km^{2} (8,621 sq mi). The capital lies in an oval-shaped valley of approximately 700 sq mi (2,000 km^{2}), surrounded by blue mountains, at an elevation of 790 m (2,590 ft) above sea level. The slope of the valley is from north to south. The mountain ranges create a moderate climate, preventing the cold winds from the north from reaching the valley and barring cyclonic storms.

The state is bordered by the Indian states of Nagaland to its north, Mizoram to its south, Assam to its west, and shares an international border with Myanmar to its east.

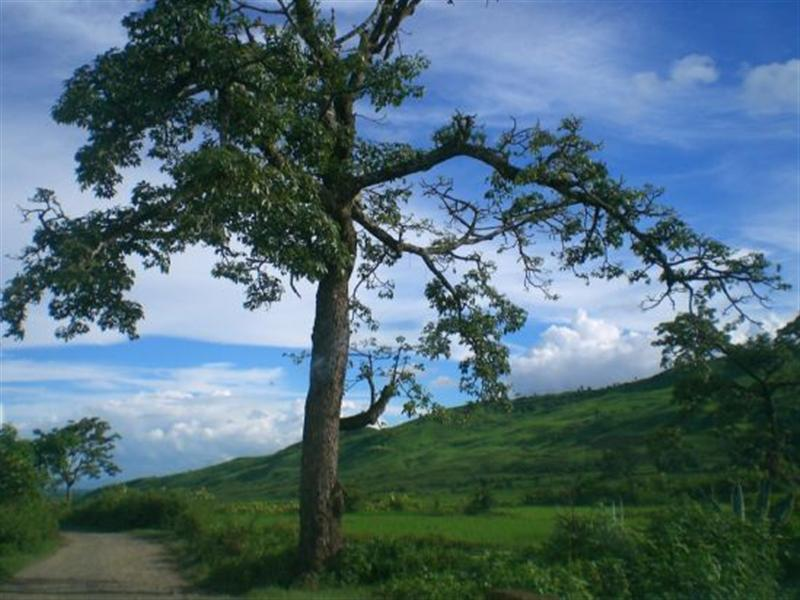
A tree amid Manipur hills.

The state has four major river basins: the Barak River Basin (Barak Valley) to the west, the Manipur River Basin in central Manipur, the Yu River Basin in the east, and a portion of the Lanye River Basin in the north. The water resources of Barak and Manipur river basins are about 1.8487 Mham (million hectare metres). The overall water balance of the state amounts to 0.7236 Mham in the annual water budget. (By comparison, India receives 400 Mham of rain annually.)

The Barak River, the largest of Manipur, originates in the Manipur Hills and is joined by tributaries, such as the Irang, Maku, and Tuivai. After its junction with the Tuivai, the Barak River turns north, forms the border with Assam State, and then enters the Cachar Assam just above Lakhipur. The Manipur river basin has eight major rivers: the Manipur, Imphal, Iril, Nambul, Sekmai, Chakpi, Thoubal and Khuga. All these rivers originate from the surrounding hills.

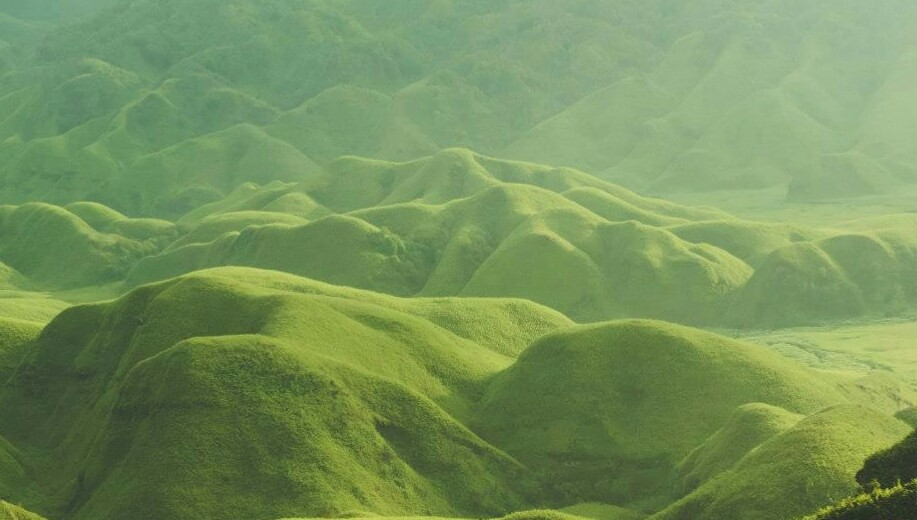
Landscape view for dawn at Senapati, Manipur

Almost all the rivers in the valley area are in the mature stage and therefore deposit their sediment load in the Loktak Lake. The rivers draining the Manipur Hills are comparatively young, due to the hilly terrain through which they flow. These rivers are corrosive and become turbulent in the rainy season. Important rivers draining the western area include the Maku, Barak, Jiri, Irang, and Leimatak. Rivers draining the eastern part of the state, the Yu River Basin, include the Chamu, Khunou and other short streams.

Manipur may be characterised as two distinct physical regions: an outlying area of rugged hills and narrow valleys, and the inner area of flat plain, with all associated landforms. These two areas are distinct in physical features and are conspicuous in flora and fauna. The valley region has hills and mounds rising above the flat surface. The Loktak Lake is an important feature of the central plain. The total area occupied by all the lakes is about 600 km^{2}. The altitude ranges from 40 m at Jiribam to 2,994 m at Mount Tempü peak along the border with Nagaland.

The soil cover can be divided into two broad types, viz. the red ferruginous soil in the hill area and the alluvium in the valley. The valley soils generally contain loam, small rock fragments, sand, and sandy clay, and are varied. On the plains, especially flood plains and deltas, the soil is quite thick. The topsoil on the steep slopes is very thin. Soil on the steep hill slopes is subject to high erosion, resulting in gullies and barren rock slopes. The normal pH value ranges from 5.4 to 6.8.

=== Flora ===
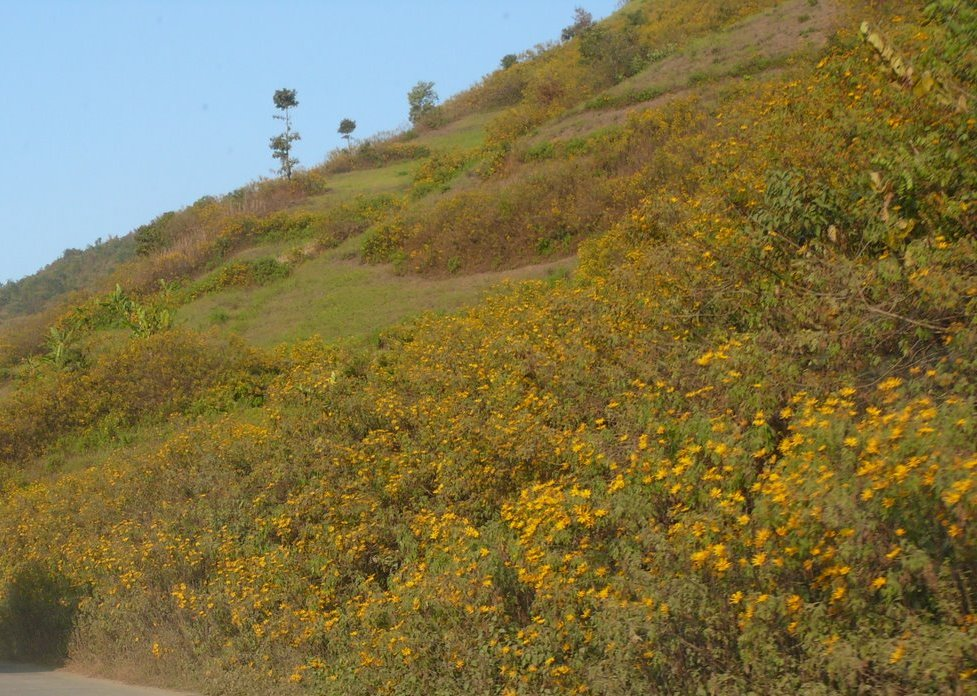
Flowers carpeting the foothills

L. mackliniae is an endemic flower to Manipur and was declared the official state flower in 1989.

Natural vegetation occupies an area of about 17,418 km^{2} (6,725 sq mi), or 77.2% of the total geographical area of the state, and consists of short and tall grasses, reeds and bamboos, and trees. About a third of Manipur's forests are protected: 8.42% of the forested land is categorized under Reserved Forests, and 23.95% under Protected Forests.

There are six major types of forests in Manipur, and 10 subtypes. The six major forest types, according to the state's Forest Department, include Tropical Wet Evergreen Forest, Tropical Moist Deciduous Forests, Sub-Tropical Pine Forest, Tropical Dry Deciduous Forest, Montane Wet Temperate Forest and Sub-alpine Forest.

There are forests of teak, pine, oak, uningthou, leihao, bamboo, and cane. Rubber, tea, coffee, orange, and cardamom are grown in hill areas. Rice is a staple food for Manipuris.

=== Climate ===
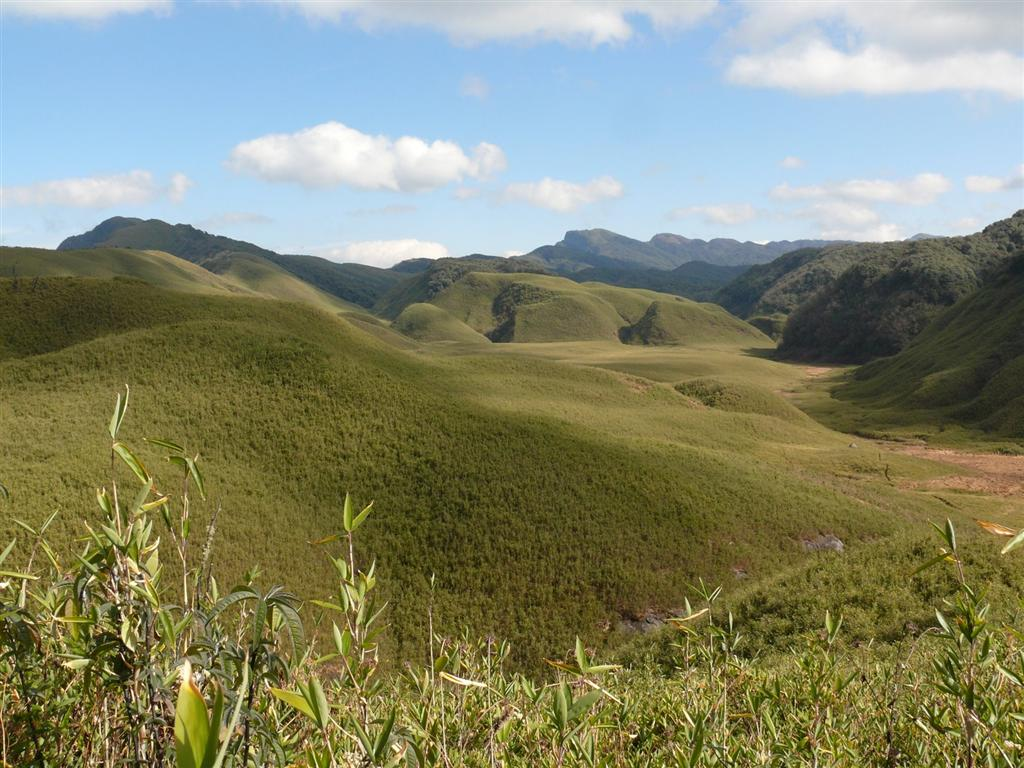
The Dzüko Valley which exists between the boundaries of Manipur and Nagaland has a temperate climate.

Manipur's climate is largely influenced by the topography of the region. Lying 790 metres above sea level, Manipur is wedged among hills on all sides. This northeastern corner of India enjoys a generally amiable climate, though the winters can be cool. The maximum temperature in the summer months is 32 °C (90 °F). The coolest conditions are in January, and the warmest month is July.

The state receives an average annual rainfall of 1,467.5 mm (57.78 in) between April and mid-October. Precipitation ranges from light rain or mizzle to heavy downpours. The capital city Imphal receives an annual average of 933 mm (36.7 in). Rainfall in this region is caused by The South Westerly Monsoon picking up moisture from the Bay of Bengal and heading towards the Eastern Himalaya ranges. This normal rainfall pattern of Manipur enriches the soil and much of the agrarian activities are dependent on it as well.

Manipur is already experiencing climate change, especially changes in weather, with both increased variability in rain as well as increasingly severe changes in temperature.

== Demographics ==
=== Population ===
Historical population
Year	Pop.	±%
1901	284,465	—
1911	346,222	+21.7%
1921	384,016	+10.9%
1931	445,606	+16.0%
1941	512,069	+14.9%
1951	577,635	+12.8%
1961	780,037	+35.0%
1971	1,072,753	+37.5%
1981	1,420,953	+32.5%
1991	1,837,149	+29.3%
2001	2,293,896	+24.9%
2011	2,855,794	+24.5%
Source: Census of India

Manipur had a population of 2,855,794 at the 2011 census. Of this total, 57.2% lived in the valley districts and the remaining 42.8% in the hill districts. The valley (plain) is mainly inhabited by the Meitei speaking population (native Manipuri speakers). The hills are inhabited mainly by several ethno-linguistically diverse tribes belonging to the Nagas, the Kukis and smaller tribal groupings. Naga and Kuki settlements are also found in the valley region, though less in numbers. There are also sizable populations of Nepalis, Bengalis, Tamils and Marwaris living in Manipur.

The distribution of area, population and density, and literacy rate as per the 2001 Census provisional figures are as below:

Demographics of Manipur (2011)
Total Population	2,855,794
Male Population	1,438,586
Female Population	1,417,208
Rural Population	1,736,236
Urban Population	834,154
Child Sex Ratio	936 female to 1000 male
Density (per km^{2})	115
Literacy	1,768,181 (85.4%)
Towns	33

=== People ===
The Meiteis (synonymous to the Manipuris) constitute the majority of the state's population. They inhabit the Imphal Valley. Nagas and Kuki-Zo are the major tribe conglomerates of tribes inhabiting the surrounding hills. The Kuki-Zos consist of several tribes including Gangte, Hmar, Paite, Simte, Sukte, Thadou, Vaiphei, Zou, and some smaller tribes. They speak Kuki-Chin languages and predominate the southern hill districts of Manipur. The prominent Naga tribes are Mao, Maram, Maring, Liangmai, Poumai, Rongmei and Tangkhul, each speaking its own language. They predominate the northern hill districts of Manipur. In addition, several smaller tribes that were classified as "Old Kuki" by the British administrators populate Chandel and neighbouring districts. Some of them now classify themselves as Nagas while others retain the Kuki classification. (Note: The Old Kuki tribes retaining the Kuki classification include: Aimol, Chiru, Kom, Koireng, Kharam, and Ralte. The tribes under the Naga umbrella include: Anal, Chothe, Koirao, Lamkang, Moyon, Monsang, Purum and Tarao.)

All Scheduled Tribes	Population	Percentage of Total Pop.
Kuki-Zo tribes	448,197	15.7%
Naga tribes	623,441	21.8%
Old Kuki/Naga	74,978	2.6%
Total	1,167,422	40.9%

=== Languages ===
Languages in Manipur (2011)
1. Meitei (53.3%)
2. Thadou (9.16%)
3. Tangkhul (6.41%)
4. Poula (4.74%)
5. Kabui (3.83%)
6. Mao (3.12%)
7. Nepali (2.23%)
8. Paite (1.92%)
9. Hmar (1.72%)
10. Liangmai (1.59%)
11. Vaiphei (1.39%)
12. Kuki (1.32%)
13. Maram (1.12%)
14. Bengali (1.07%)
15. Anal (0.93%)
16. Zou (0.91%)
17. Maring (0.90%)
18. Other (4.34%)

The official language of the state is Meitei (also known as Manipuri). It is a scheduled language in the Republic of India, and serves as the lingua franca in Manipur.

Other than Meitei language, in Manipur, there is considerable linguistic diversity, as is the case in most of the Northeast India. Almost all of the languages are Sino-Tibetan, with many different subgroups represented. There are multiple Kuki-Chin languages, the largest being Thadou and is spoken in all the hill districts. Another major language family is the Naga languages, like Tangkhul, Poula, Rongmei and Mao. Less than 5% speak Indo-European languages, mostly Nepali and Bengali, which is the major language of Jiribam district.

The Directorate of Language Planning and Implementation (AKA Department of Language Planning and Implementation) of the Government of Manipur works for the development and the promotion of Meitei language and other local vernaculars of Manipur.

==== Linguistic events ====
- Meitei language day (Manipuri language day)
- Meitei poetry day (Manipuri poetry day)
- Meitei language movements
  - Meitei classical language movement (ongoing)
  - Meitei linguistic purism movement (ongoing)
  - Meitei scheduled language movement (successful)

== Administrative divisions ==
=== Districts ===
District	Population (2011)	Area (km^{2})	Density (/km^{2})
Bishnupur	240,363	496	415
Thoubal	420,517	324	713
Imphal East	452,661	497	555
Imphal West	514,683	519	847
Senapati	354,772	1,573	116
Ukhrul	183,115	2,206	31
Chandel	144,028	2,100	37
Churachandpur	271,274	2,392	50
Tamenglong	140,143	3,315	25
Jiribam	43,818	182	190
Kangpokpi		1,698	
Kakching	135,481	190	
Tengnoupal		1,213	
Kamjong	45,616	2,338	23
Noney		1,076	
Pherzawl	47,250	2,128	21

=== Subdivisions ===
Districts	Subdivisions
Bishnupur	Nambol, Moirang, Bishnupur
Thoubal	Thoubal, Lilong
Imphal East	Porompat, Keirao Bitra, Sawombung
Imphal West	Lamshang, Patsoi, Lamphelpat, Wangoi
Senapati	Tadubi, Paomata, Purul, Willong, Chilivai Phaibung, Songsong, Lairouching
Ukhrul	Ukhrul, Lungchong Maiphai, Chingai, Jessami
Chandel	Chandel, Chakpikarong, Khengjoy
Churachandpur	churchandpur, Tuiboung, Sangaikot, Mualnuam, Singngat, Henglep, Suangdoh, Kangvai, Samulamlan, Saikot
Tamenglong	Tamenglong, Tamei, Tousem
Jiribam	Jiribam, Borobekra
Kangpokpi (Sadar Hills)	Kangpokpi, Champhai, Saitu Gamphazol, Kangchup Geljang, Tuijang Waichong, Saikul, Lhungtin Island, Bungte Chiru
Kakching	Kakching, Waikhong
Tengnoupal	Machi, Moreh, Tengnoupal
Kamjong	Kamjong, Kasom Khullen, Sahamphung, Phungyar
Noney	Nungba, Khoupum, Longmai, Haochong
Pherzawl	Pherzawl, Parbung Tipaimukh, Vangai Range, Thanlon

== Religion ==
Religion in Manipur (2011)
1. Hinduism (41.4%)
2. Christianity (41.3%)
3. Islam (8.40%)
4. Buddhism (0.25%)
5. Jainism (0.06%)
6. Sikhism (0.05%)
7. Other religion (8.19%)
8. No religion (0.38%)

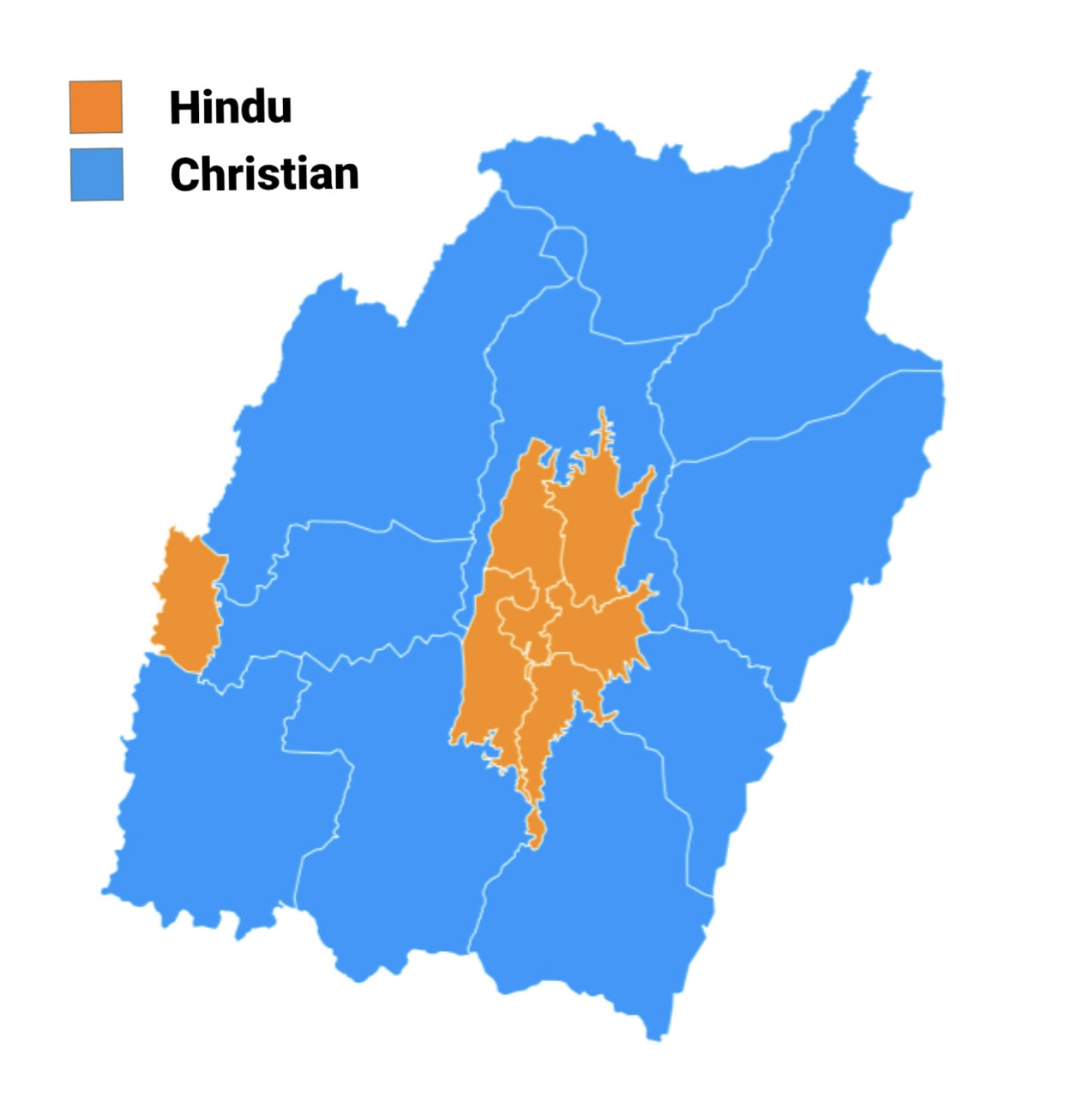
Largest religion by district in Manipur, 2011 census

Hinduism and Christianity are the major religions practised in Manipur. Between the 1961 and 2011 censuses of India, the share of Hindus in the state declined from 62% to 41%, while the share of Christians rose from 19% to 41%. The religious groups of the Meitei-speaking people include Hindus, Sanamahists, Meitei Christians and Meitei Pangals. Besides these, tribal communities other than the Meitei-speaking population are mostly Christians.

=== Hinduism ===
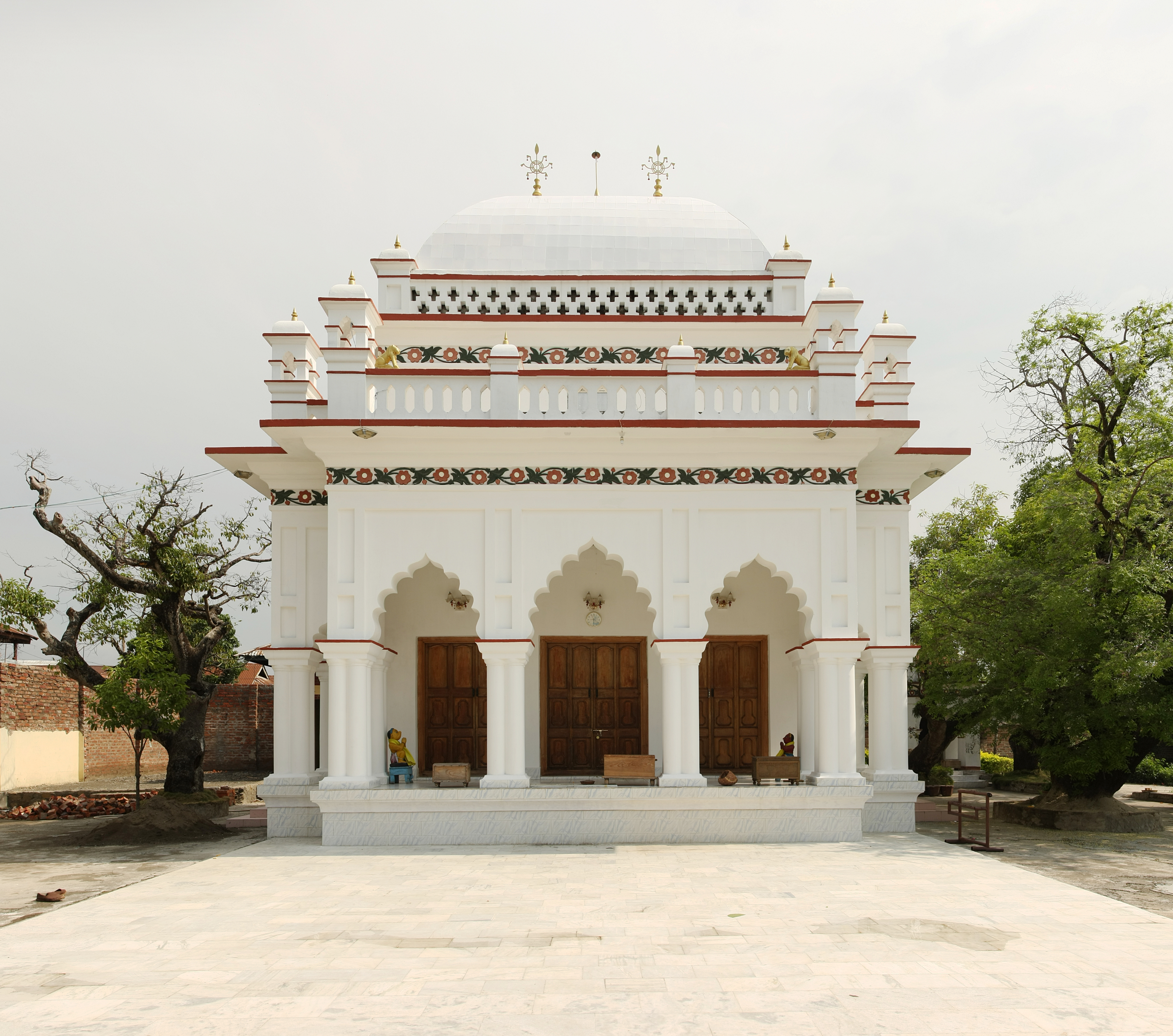
Ningthoukhong Gopinath Temple

The Meitei ethnicity (aka Manipuri people) is the majority group following Hinduism in Manipur, beside other minor immigrants from other parts of India following the same faith. Among the indigenous communities of Manipur, Meiteis are the only Hindus as no other indigenous ethnic groups follow this faith. According to the 2011 Census of India, about 41.39% of the Manipuri people practise Hinduism. The Hindu population is heavily concentrated in the Meitei dominant areas of the Manipur Valley (Imphal Valley), among the Meitei people. The districts of Bishnupur, Thoubal, Imphal East, and Imphal West all have Hindu majorities, averaging 67.62% (range 62.27–74.81%) according to the 2011 census data.

Vaishnavite Hinduism was the state religion of the Kingdom of Manipur. In 1704, Meitei King Charairongba accepted Vaishnavism and changed his traditional Meitei name into Hindu name, Pitambar Singh. During the 13th century, Meitei King Khumomba constructed a Lord Hanuman temple. The Vishnu temple at Lamangdong was constructed during 1474 CE (during the reign of Meitei King Kiyamba), by Brahmins immigrating from the neighborhood Shan State. As per the legends, the temple was constructed to house the Vishnu emblem given to King Kiyamba by King Khekhomba of Shan. Phurailatpam Shubhi Narayan was the first Brahmin priest of this temple.

=== Christianity ===
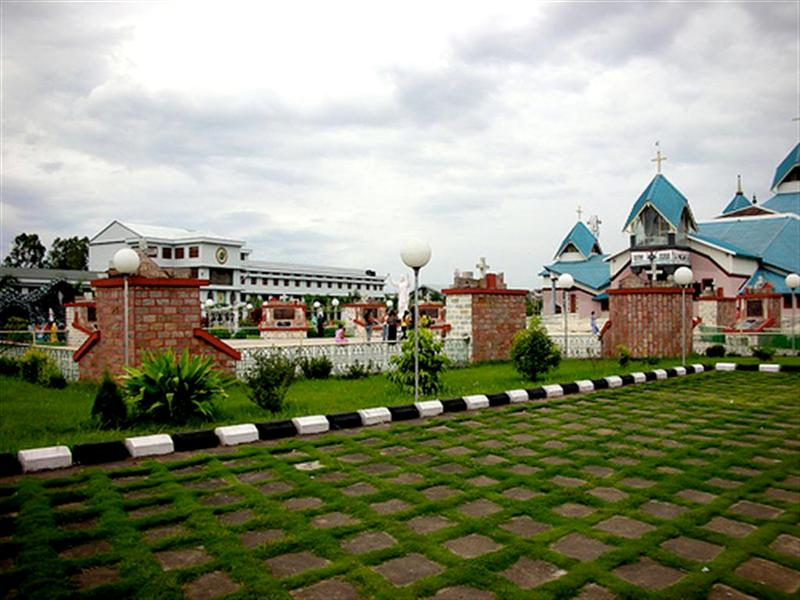
St. Joseph's Cathedral at Imphal

Christianity is the religion of 41% of the people in the state, but is the majority in rural areas with 53%, and is predominant in the hills. The vast majority of Manipuri Christians are Protestants; primarily Baptists and Presbyterians. It was brought by Protestant missionaries to Manipur in the 19th century. In the 20th century, a few Christian schools were established, which introduced Western-type education. Christianity is the predominant religion among tribals of Manipur and tribal Christians make up the vast majority of the Christian population in Manipur.

=== Islam ===
The Meitei Pangals (Meitei: ꯃꯩꯇꯩ ꯄꯥꯡꯒꯜ), also known as Meitei Muslims or Manipuri Muslims, are the third largest religious majority group in the state, comprising less than 8.3% (Note: The majority of Muslims are in Manipur are Pangals/Pangan, but some other minor Muslim groups are also there.) of the state population. The majority belong to the Hanafi school of Sunni Islamic thought. In 1991, the Quran was translated into the Meitei language for the first time. (See History of Manipuri Muslims)

=== Sanamahism ===
The symbol of Sanamahism religion, the indigenous ethnic religion of the Meitei people.

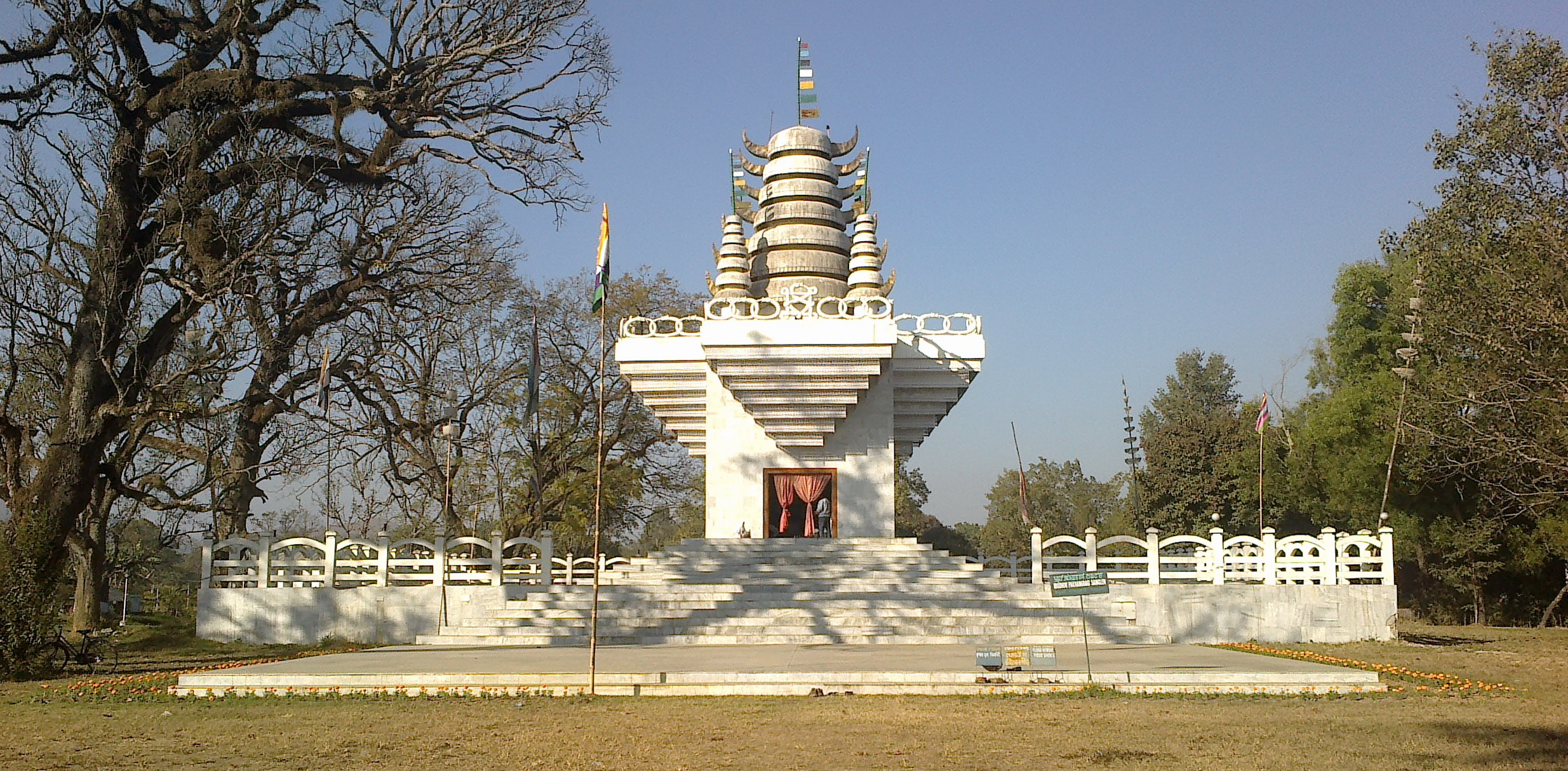
A reconstructed ancient temple dedicated to Meitei God Pakhangba of Sanamahism inside the Kangla Fort, Imphal

Sanamahism is the indigenous, polytheistic and animistic ethnic religion of the Meitei people. Sanamahist worship concentrates on the household deity Lainingthou Sanamahi. The ancient Meiteis worshiped a Supreme deity, Salailen, and followed their ancestors. Their ancestor worship and animism was based on Umang Lai – ethnic governing deities worshiped in the sacred groves. Some of the traditional Meitei deities, or Lais are Atiya Sidaba, Pakhangba, Sanamahi, and Panthoibi. Out of the 233,767 people who opted for the "Other religion" option, 222,315 were Sanamahists.

=== Other religions ===
The various other religions were mostly followers of tribal folk religions, 6,444 were Heraka, 2,032 were Jewish and 1,180 were from other tribal religions such as Tingkao Ragwang Chapriak.

== Government ==
The emblem of the Government of Manipur depicts Kangla Sha (Kangla Sa), an ancient Meitei deity, and a Meitei language text written in Meitei script

The government of Manipur is a collective assembly of 60 elected members, of which 19 are reserved for Scheduled Tribes and 1 for Scheduled Castes. The state sends two representatives to the Lok Sabha of the Parliament of India. The state sends one representative to the Rajya Sabha. The legislature of the state is Unicameral. Representatives are elected for a five-year term to the state assembly and the Indian parliament through voting, a process overseen by the offices of the Election Commission of India.

The state has one autonomous council.

For administrative purposes, the state of Manipur is divided into 16 districts, each headed by a Deputy Commissioner (DC), who is an officer of the Indian Administrative Service (IAS). The Deputy Commissioner also serves as the Collector and the District Magistrate. Each district is further divided into subdivisions, which are headed by Sub-Divisional Officers (SDOs). For development administration, each district is divided into Community Development (CD) Blocks, which are headed by Block Development Officers (BDOs).

Other key district officials include the Superintendent of Police (SP), an Indian Police Service officer who oversees the police administration in the district.

For local governance, the state has a three-tier Panchayati Raj system for rural areas and municipal bodies for urban areas. There are nine Municipal Councils (MCs), 18 Nagar Panchayats (NPs), and one Small Town Committee, making a total of 28 urban local bodies.

=== Civil unrest ===
==== Social movements ====
There were many public movements in Manipur against the government:

- Meitei classical language movement
- Meitei scheduled language movement
- Meitei linguistic purism movement

==== Security and insurgency ====
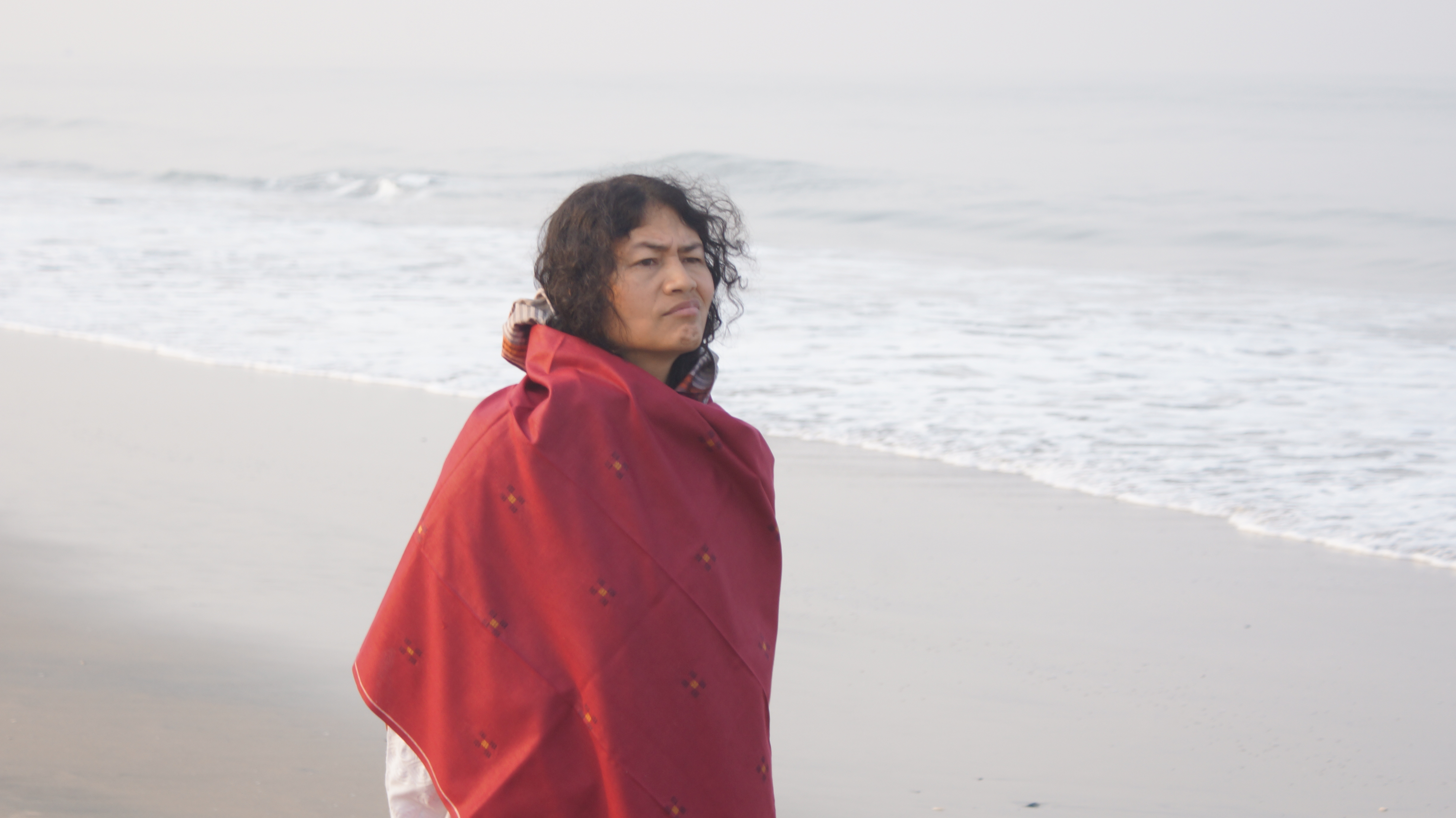
Irom Chanu Sharmila, the world's longest hunger striker, who went on hunger strike for more than 500 weeks, demanding the repealing of the Armed Forces (Special Powers) Act, 1958 in Manipur

The violence in Manipur extends beyond the conflict between Indian security forces and insurgent armed groups. There is violence between the Meitei ethnicity, various Naga tribes, various Kuki tribes, and other tribal groups.

Splinter groups have arisen within some of the armed groups, and disagreement between them is rife. Other than the UNLF, PLA, and PREPAK, Manipuri insurgent groups include the Revolutionary Peoples Front (RPF), Manipur Liberation Front Army (MLFA), Kanglei Yawol Kanba Lup (KYKL), Revolutionary Joint Committee (RJC), Kangleipak Communist Party (KCP), Peoples United Liberation Front (PULF), Manipur Naga People Front (MNPF), National Socialist Council of Nagaland (NSCN-K), National Socialist Council of Nagaland (NSCN-I/M), United Kuki Liberation Front (UKLF), Kuki National Front (KNF), Kuki National Army (KNA), Kuki Defence Force (KDF), Kuki Democratic Movement (KDM), Kuki National Organisation (KNO), Kuki Security Force (KSF), Chin Kuki Revolutionary Front (CKRF), Kom Rem Peoples Convention (KRPC), Zomi Revolutionary Volunteers (ZRV), Zomi Revolutionary Army (ZRA), Zomi Reunification Organisation (ZRO), and Hmar Peoples Convention (HPC).

The Meitei insurgent groups seek independence from India. The Kuki insurgent groups want a separate state for the Kukis to be carved out from the present state of Manipur. The Kuki insurgent groups are under two umbrella organisations: the Kuki National Organisation (KNO) and United Peoples Forum. The Nagas wish to annex part of Manipur and merge with a greater Nagaland or Nagalim, which is in conflict with Meitei insurgent demands for the integrity of their vision of an independent state. There have been many tensions between the tribes and numerous clashes between Naga and Kukis, Meiteis and Muslims.

According to SATP in 2014, there had been a dramatic decline in fatalities in Manipur since 2009. In 2009, 77 civilians died (about 3 per 100,000 people). From 2010 onward, about 25 civilians have died in militant-related violence (about 1 per 100,000 people), dropping further to 21 civilian deaths in 2013 (or 0.8 per 100,000 people). However, there were 76 explosions in 2013 compared to 107 in 2012. Different groups have claimed responsibility for the explosions, some claiming they were targeting competing militant groups, others claiming their targets were state and central government officials. As a point of comparison, the average annual global rate of violent death between 2004 and 2009 was 7.9 per 100,000 people.

== Economy ==
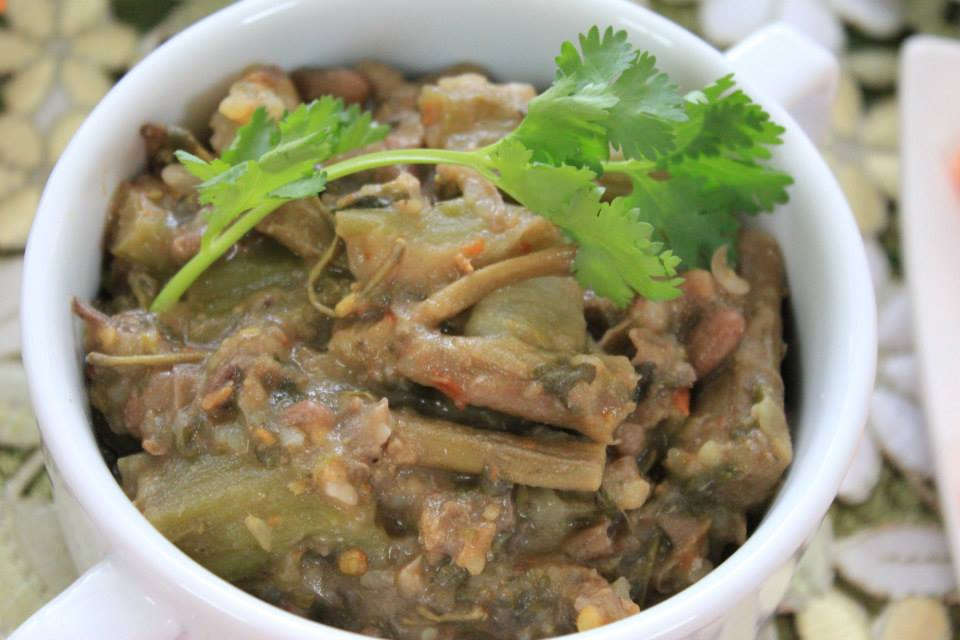
Bamboo is common in Manipur, and an important contributor to its economy as well as cuisine. Above is soibum yendem eromba, a bamboo shoot dish of Manipur.

The 2012–2013 gross state domestic product of Manipur at market prices was about ₹10,188 crore (US$1.1 billion). Its economy is primarily agriculture, forestry, cottage and trade driven. Manipur acts as India's "Gateway to the East" through Moreh and Tamu towns, the land route for trade between India and Burma and other countries in Southeast Asia, East Asia, Siberia, the Arctic, Micronesia and Polynesia. Manipur has the highest number of handicraft units and the highest number of craftspersons in the northeastern region of India.

=== Electricity ===
Manipur produced about 0.1 GWh (0.36 TJ) of electricity in 2010 with its infrastructure. The state has hydroelectric power generation potential, estimated to be over 2 GWh (7.2 TJ). As of 2010, if half of this potential is realised, it is estimated that this would supply 24/7 electricity to all residents, with a surplus for sale, as well as supplying the Burma power grid.

=== Agriculture ===
Manipur's climate and soil conditions make it ideally suited for horticultural crops. Growing there are rare and exotic medicinal and aromatic plants. Some cash crops suited for Manipur include lychees, cashews, walnuts, oranges, lemons, pineapples, papayas, passion fruit, peaches, pears, and plums. The state is covered with over 3,000 km^{2} (1,200 sq mi) of bamboo forests, making it a major contributor to India's bamboo industry.

Agriculture in Manipur includes a number of smallholding farms, many of whom are owned by women. Climate change, especially changes in temperature and weather are hurting small farmers in the state. Like rural women in other parts of the world, women in agriculture in Manipur are harmed more by the changes in weather, because of less access to support from local governments.

=== Transportation infrastructure ===
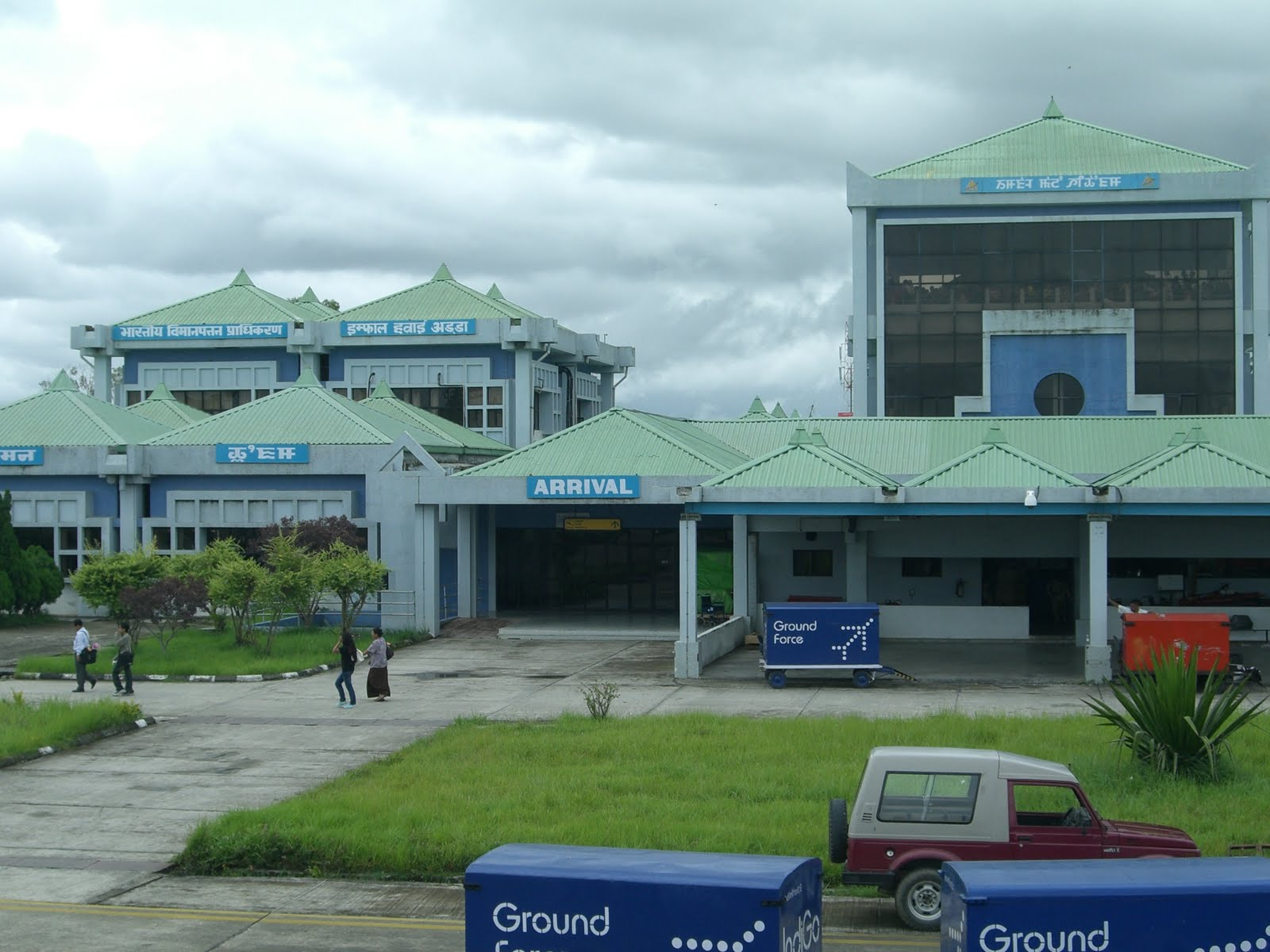
Imphal airport is the second largest airport in India's northeast.

Tulihal Airport, Changangei, Imphal, the only airport of Manipur, connects directly with Delhi, Kolkata, Guwahati, and Agartala. It has been upgraded to an international airport. As India's second largest airport in the northeast, it serves as a key logistical centre for northeastern states. The Tulihal Airport has been renamed Bir Tikendrajit Airport. National Highway NH-39 links Manipur with the rest of the country through the railway stations at Dimapur in Nagaland at a distance of 215 km (134 mi) from Imphal.

National Highway 53 (India) connects Manipur with another railway station at Silchar in Assam, which is 269 km (167 mi) away from Imphal. The road network of Manipur, with a length of 7,170 km (4,460 mi) connects all the important towns and distant villages. However, the road condition throughout the state is often deplorable. In 2010, Indian government announced that it is considering an Asian infrastructure network from Manipur to Vietnam. The proposed Trans-Asian Railway (TAR), if constructed, will pass through Manipur, connecting India to Burma, Thailand, Malaysia and Singapore.

=== Tourism ===
The tourist season is from October to February when it is often sunny without being hot and humid. The culture features martial arts, dance, theatre and sculpture. Greenery accompanies a moderate climate. The seasonal Shirui Lily plant at Ukhrul (district), Dzüko Valley at Senapati, Sangai (Brow antlered deer) and the floating islands at Loktak Lake are among the rarities of the area. Polo, which can be called a royal game, originated in Manipur.

==== UNESCO list ====
The Keibul Lamjao National Park (KLNP), which is the world's only floating national park, located in the Loktak lake, is under the tentative lists of the UNESCO World Heritage Sites, under the title "Keibul Lamjao Conservation Area (KLCA)", additionally covering the buffer of Loktak Lake (140 sq km) and Pumlen Pat (43 sq. km), besides the 40 sq km of the KLNP.

The Kangla (officially called the Kangla Fort), which was the historic seat of administration of the Meitei rulers of Manipur Kingdom, is also moved in the Indian Parliament, to be included in the UNESCO World Heritage Site list.

==== Imphal (capital) ====
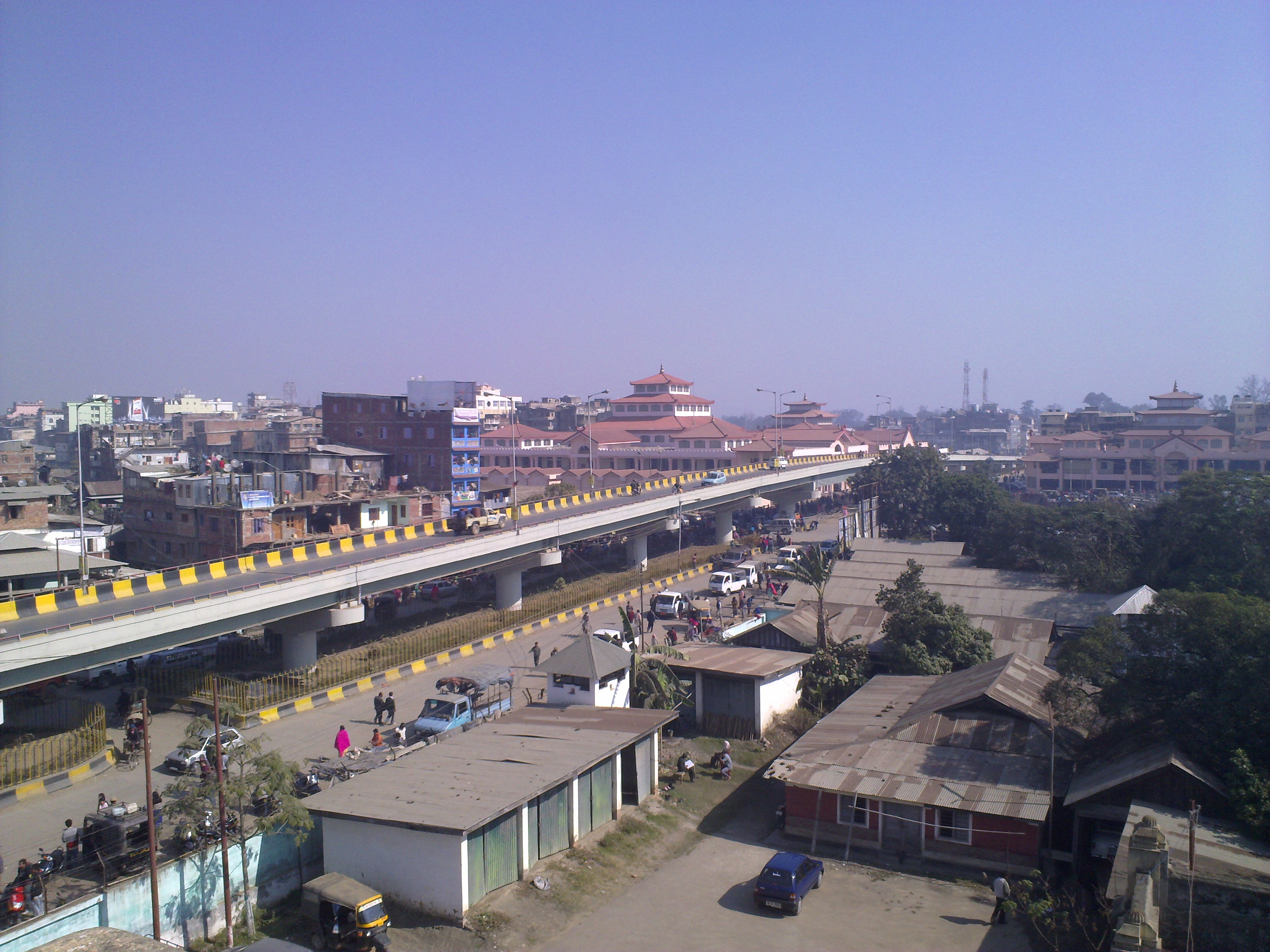
A view of Imphal City

The city is inhabited by the Meitei people and other communities. The city contains the Tulihal Airport. The district is divided into East and West. The Khuman Lampak Sports Complex was built for the 1997 National Games. The stadium is used for a sports venue. It also contains a cyclists' velodrome. Most of the imported goods are sold at Paona Bazaar, Gambhir Singh Shopping Complex and Leima Plaza. Kangla Fort, Marjing Polo Statue, Sanamahi Kiyong, Ima Market, Samban-Lei Sekpil, Shree Govindajee Temple, Andro village, and Manipur State Museum are in the city.

==== Lakes and islands ====
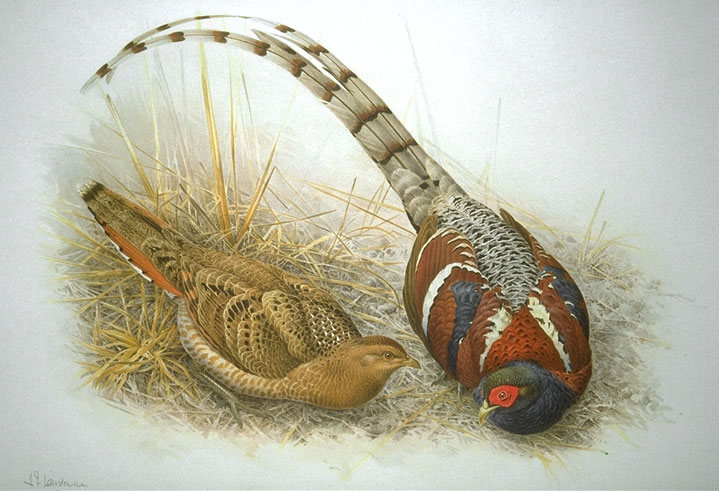
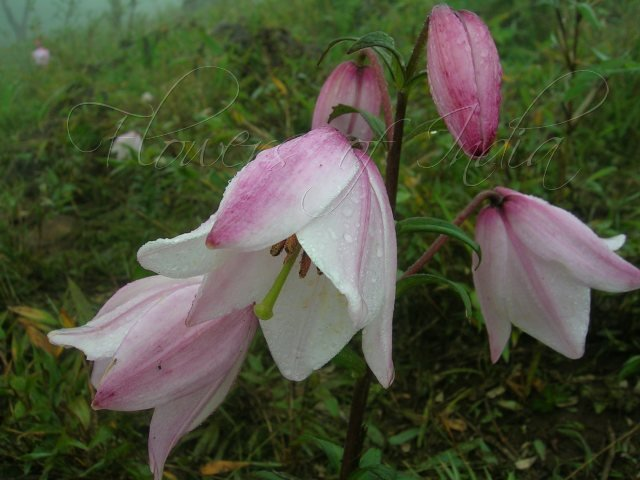
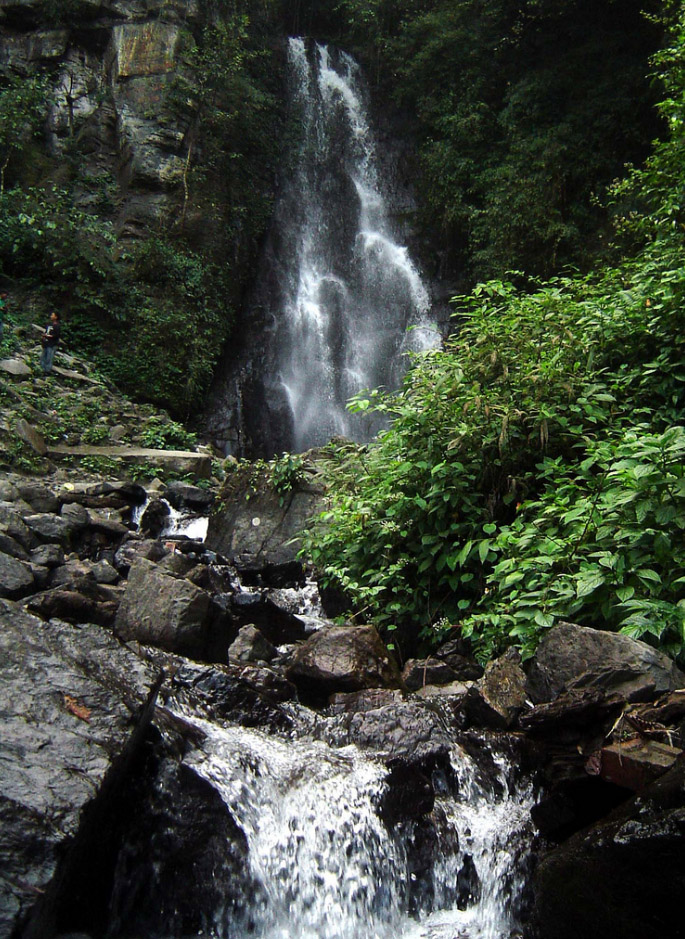
Rare birds and flowers include: Nongin is the state bird (top) and Siroi Lily is its state flower (middle). Sadu Chiru waterfalls, bottom, is a local attraction.

48 km (30 mi) from Imphal, lies the largest fresh water lake in northeast India, the Loktak Lake, a miniature inland sea. There is a tourist bungalow atop Sendra Island. Life on the lake includes small islands that are floating weed on which live the lake people, the blue waters of the lake, and colourful water plants. There is a Sendra tourist home with an attached cafeteria in the middle of the lake. Floating islands are made out of the tangle of watery weeds and other plants. The wetland is swampy and is favourable for a number of species. It is in the district of Bishnupur. The etymology of Loktak is "lok = stream / tak = the end" (End of the Streams). Sendra park and resort is opening on the top of Sendra hills and attracting the tourist.

==== Hills and valleys ====
Kaina is a hillock about 921 m (3,022 ft) above sea level. It is a sacred place for Manipuri Hindus. The legend is that, Shri Govindajee appeared in the dream of his devotee, Shri Jai Singh Maharaja, and asked the saintly king to install in a temple, an image of Shri Govindajee. It was to be carved out of a jack fruit tree, which was then growing at Kaina. It is 29 km (18 mi) from Imphal. The Dzüko Valley is in Senapati district bordering with Kohima. There are seasonal flowers and number of flora and fauna. It is at an altitude of 2,438 m (7,999 ft) above sea level, behind Mount Japfü in Nagaland. The rare Dzüko lily is found only in this valley.

==== Eco tourism ====
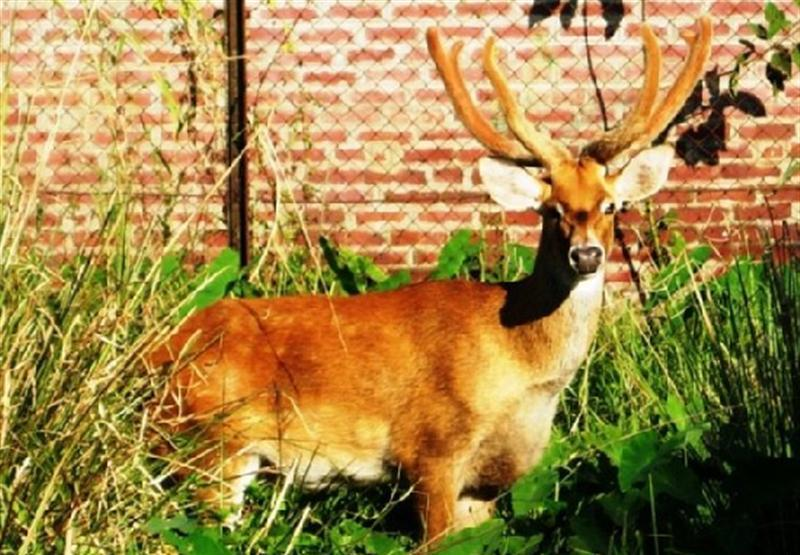
Sangai, the state animal, at Keibul Lamjao National Park. In the wild, it has a habit of waiting and looking back at viewers.

Keibul Lamjao National Park, 48 km (30 mi) away from Imphal is an abode of the rare and endangered species of brow antlered deer. This ecosystem contains 17 rare species of mammals. It is the only floating national park of the world. Six km (3.7 mi) to the west of Imphal, at the foot of the pine growing hillocks at Iroisemba on the Imphal-Kangchup Road are the Zoological Gardens. Some brow antlered deer (Sangai) are housed there.

==== Waterfalls ====
Sadu Chiru waterfall is near Ichum Keirap village 27 km (17 mi) from Imphal, in the Sadar hill area, Senapati district. This consists of three falls with the first fall about 30 m (98 ft) high. Agape Park is in the vicinity.

==== Natural caves ====
Thalon Cave (around 910 m (2,990 ft) above sea level) is one of the historical sites of Manipur under Tamenglong district. It is around 185 km (115 mi) from the state capital and around 30 km (19 mi) from Tamenglong district headquarters in north side. From Thalon village, this cave is 4–5 km (2.5–3.1 mi). Khangkhui Cave is a natural limestone cave in Ukhrul district. The big hall in the cave is the darbar hall of the Devil King living deep inside while the northern hall is the royal bedroom, according to local folklore. During World War II, villagers sought shelter here. This cave is an hour's trek from Khangkui village.

== Education ==
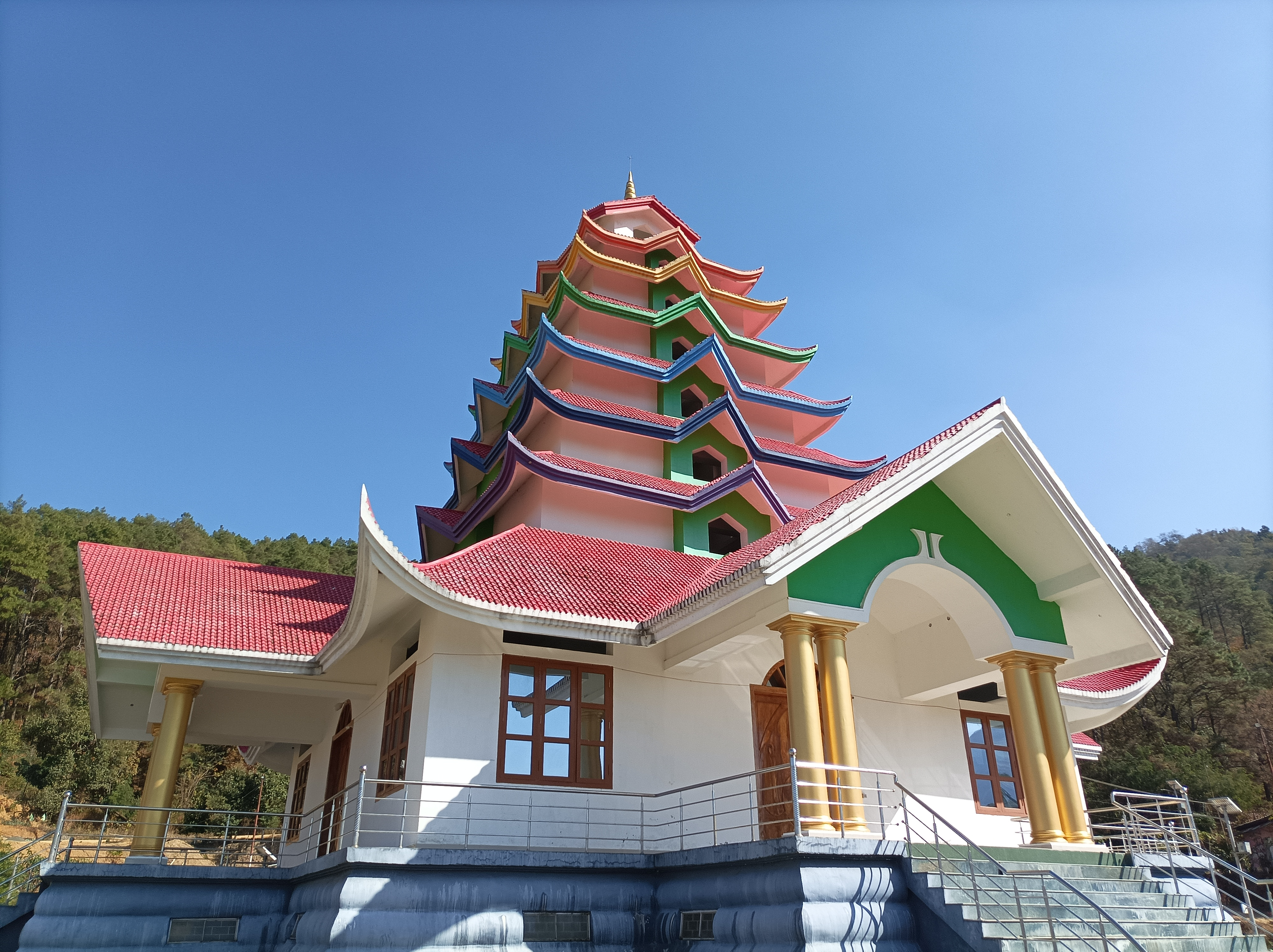
The Sanamahi Kiyong shrine is the central body of the University of Sanamahi Culture in the Nongmaiching Ching mountain.

Manipur schools are run by the state and central government or by private organisation. Instruction is mainly in English. Under the 10+2+3 plan, students may enroll in general or professional degree programs after passing the Higher Secondary Examination (the grade 12 examination). The main universities are Manipur University, Central Agricultural University, National Institute of Technology, Manipur, Indian Institute of Information Technology, Manipur, Jawaharlal Nehru Institute of Medical Sciences, Regional Institute of Medical Sciences and Indira Gandhi National Tribal University.

Manipur is home to India's first floating elementary school: Loktak Elementary Floating School in Loktak Lake.

== Transportation ==
Manipur serves as the passing point of the India–Myanmar–Thailand Trilateral Highway, having Imphal-Mandalay-Bangkok route with a distance of 1,813 km (1,127 miles) to improve the ASEAN–India Free Trade Area.

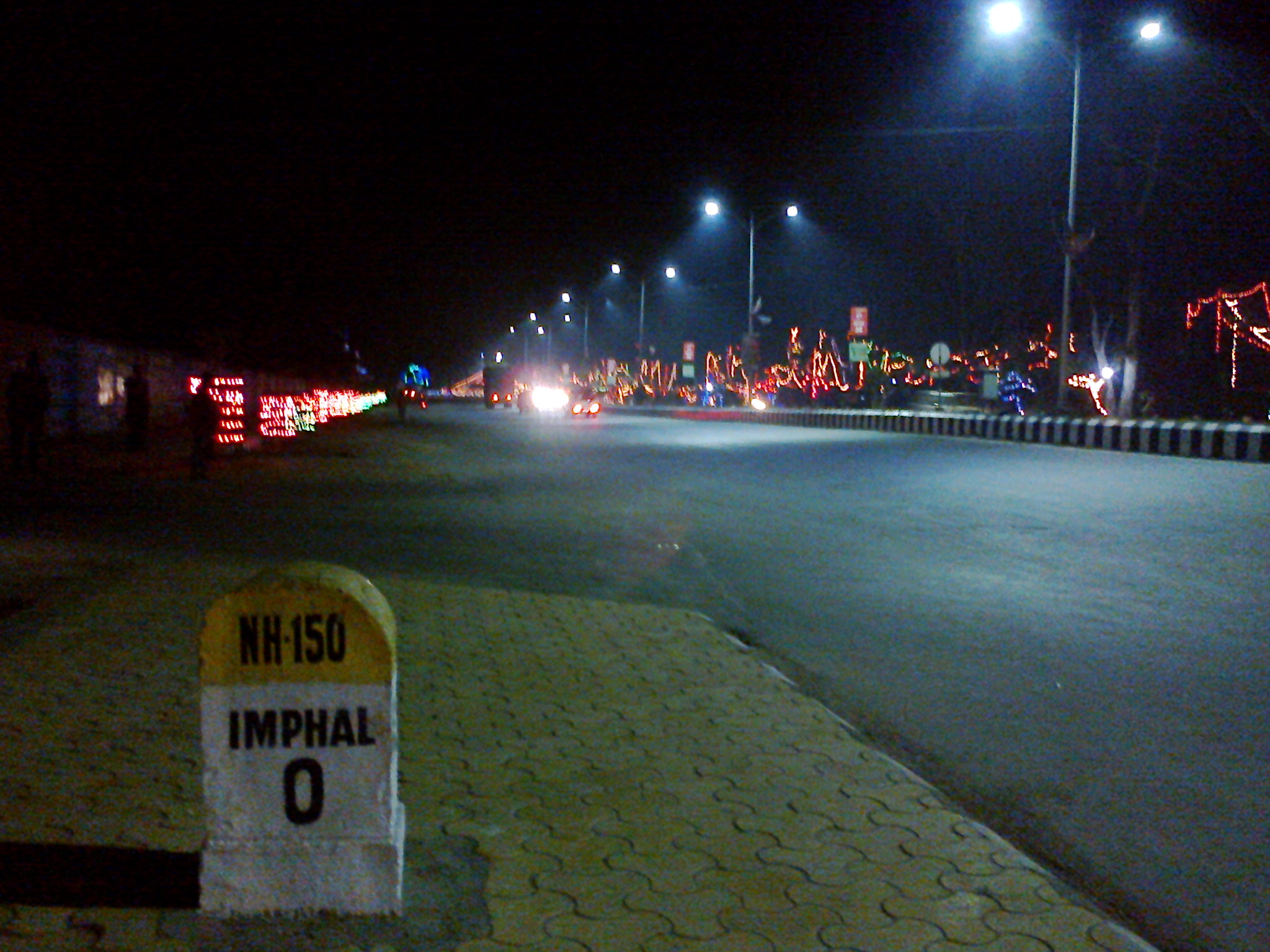
National Highway 150 in Imphal

=== Air ===
Bir Tikendrajit International Airport is situated in the capital Imphal which connects direct flights from Imphal to Kolkata, Guwahati, New Delhi, Bangalore and Agartala.

=== Roadways ===
Manipur is connected to all its neighbouring states with National Highways.

=== Rail ===
Manipur has one operational railway station, Jiribam. Imphal railway station, is an under-construction railway station in Imphal, the capital of Manipur.

== Art and culture ==
Secular theatre is mostly confined to themes that are not religious; it is performed in the secular or profane spheres. In these are Shumang lila and Phampak lila (stage drama). Shumang lila is very popular. Etymologically Shumang lila is the combination of "Shumang" (courtyard) and "Lila" (play or performance). It is performed in an area of 13×13 ft in the centre of any open space, in a very simple style without a raised stage, set design, or heavy props such as curtains, background scenery, and visual effects. It uses one table and two chairs, kept on one side of the performance space. Its claim as the "theatre of the masses" is underlined by the way it is performed in the middle of an audience that surrounds it, leaving one passage as entrance and exit.

The world of Phampak lila (stage drama) performed in the proscenium theatre is similar, in form, to the Western theatrical model and Indian Natyasastra model though its contents are indigenous. The so-called modern theatre descended on Manipur theatre culture with the performance of Pravas Milan (1902) under the enthusiastic patronage of Sir Churchand Maharaj (1891–1941). The pace of theatrical movement was geared up with the institution of groups such as Manipur Dramatic Union (MDU) (1930), Arian Theatre (1935), Chitrangada Natya Mandir (1936), Society Theatre (1937), Rupmahal (1942), Cosmopolitan Dramatic Union (1968), and the Chorus Repertory Theatre of Ratan Thiyam (1976). These groups started experimenting with types of plays apart from historical and Puranic ones. Today Manipur theatre is well respected because of excellent productions shown in India and abroad. Manipur plays, both Shumang lila and stage lila, have been a regular feature in the annual festival of the National School of Drama, New Delhi.

Iskcon led by Bhaktisvarupa Damodara Swami started a network of schools in Northeastern India, where more than 4,000 students receive education centred on Vaishnava spiritual values. In 1989 he founded "Ranganiketan Manipuri Cultural Arts Troupe", which has approximately 600 performances at over 300 venues in over 15 countries. Ranganiketan (literally "House of Colorful Arts") is a group of more than 20 dancers, musicians, singers, martial artists, choreographers, and craft artisans. Some of them have received international acclaim.

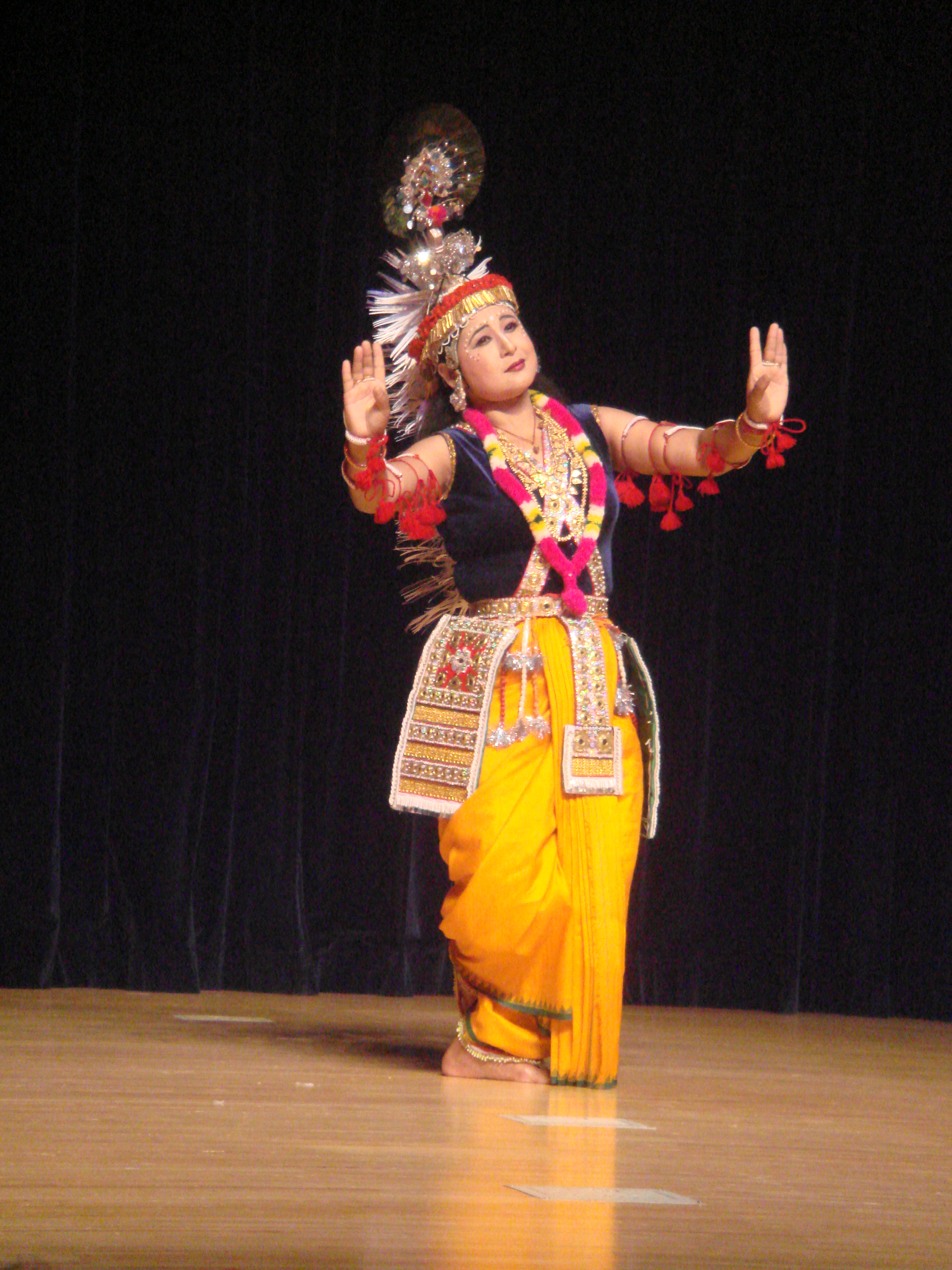
Manipuri dance, one of eight the classical dances of India

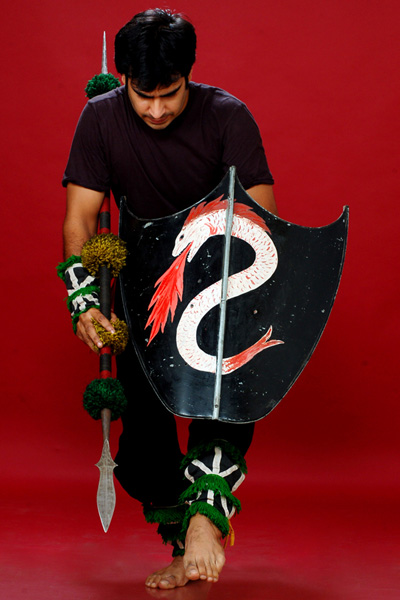
Thang Ta, the martial art form of Manipur

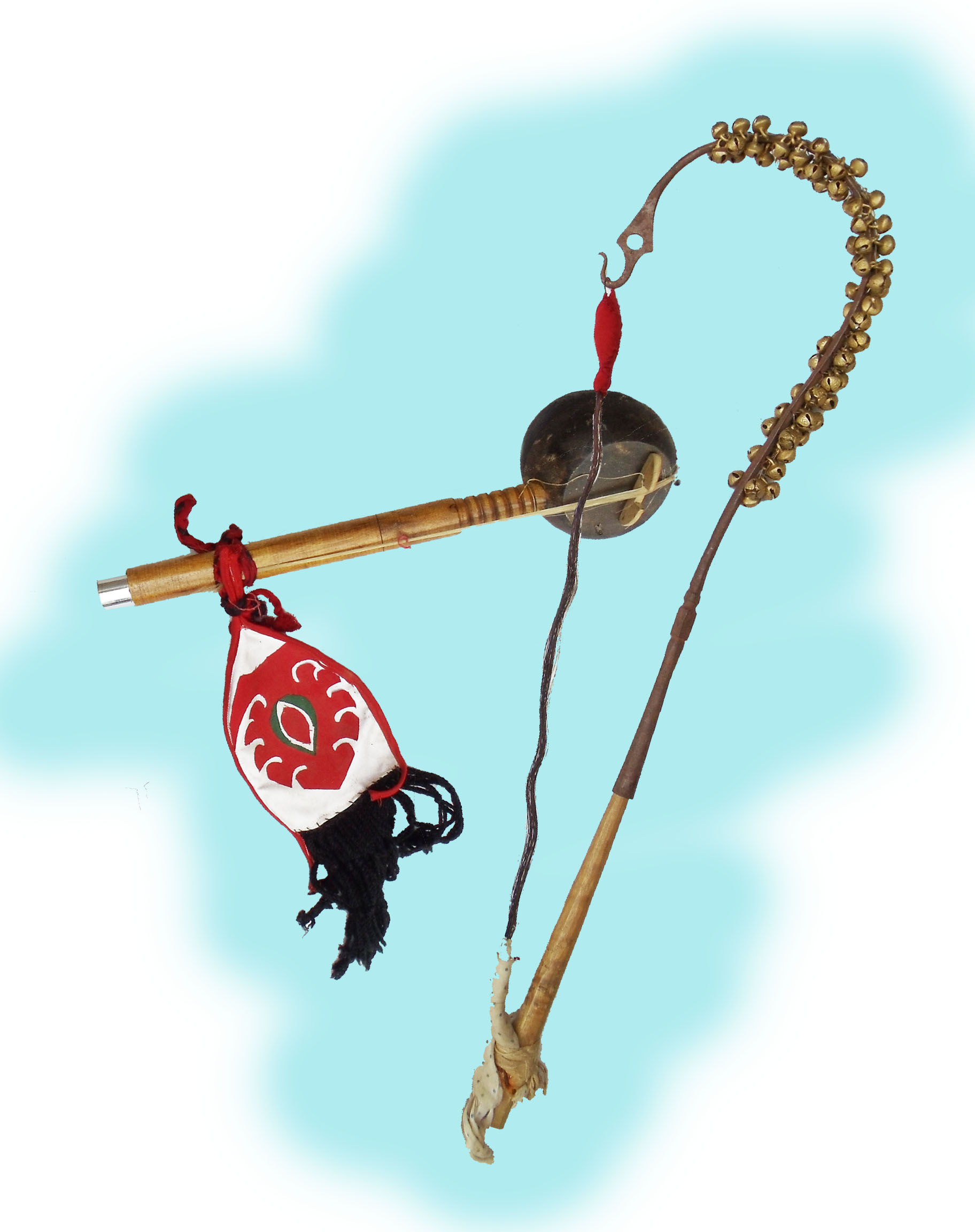
Pena is an ancient Manipur musical instrument, particularly popular among the Meitei people.

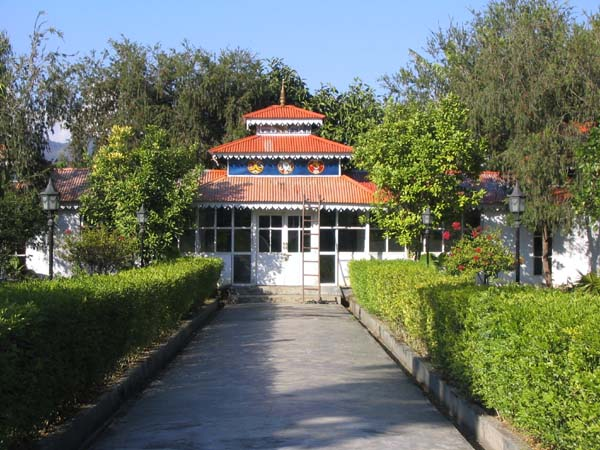
The Chorus Repertory Theatre, Imphal, founded by Ratan Thiyam

=== Manipur dance (Ras Lila) ===
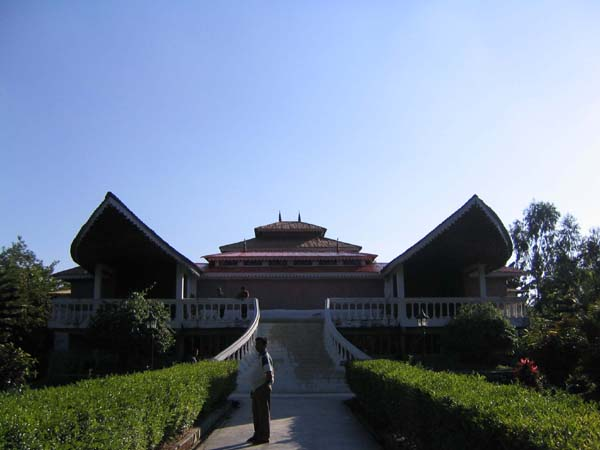
The Shrine – the main theatre

Manipuri dance also known as Jagoi, is one of the major Indian classical dance forms, named after the state of Manipur. It is particularly known for its Hindu Vaishnavism themes, and exquisite performances of love-inspired dance drama of Radha-Krishna called Raslila. However, the dance is also performed to themes related to Shaivism, Shaktism and regional deities such as Umang Lai during Lai Haraoba. The roots of Manipur dance, as with all classical Indian dances, is the ancient Hindu Sanskrit text Natya Shastra, but with influences from the culture fusion between India and Southeast Asia, East Asia, Siberia, Micronesia and Polynesia.

=== Chorus Repertory Theatre ===
The auditorium of the theatre is on the outskirts of Imphal and the campus stretches for about 2 acres (8,100 m^{2}). It has housing and working quarters to accommodate self-sufficiency of life. The theatre association has churned out internationally acclaimed plays like Chakravyuha and Uttarpriyadashi. Its 25 years of existence in theatre had disciplined its performers to a world of excellence. Chakravyuha taken from the Mahabharat epic had won Fringe Firsts Award, 1987 at the Edinburgh International Theater Festival. Chakravyuha deals with the story of Abhimanyu (son of Arjun) of his last battle and approaching death, whereas Uttarpriyadashi is an 80-minute exposition of Emperor Ashoka's redemption.

== Sports ==
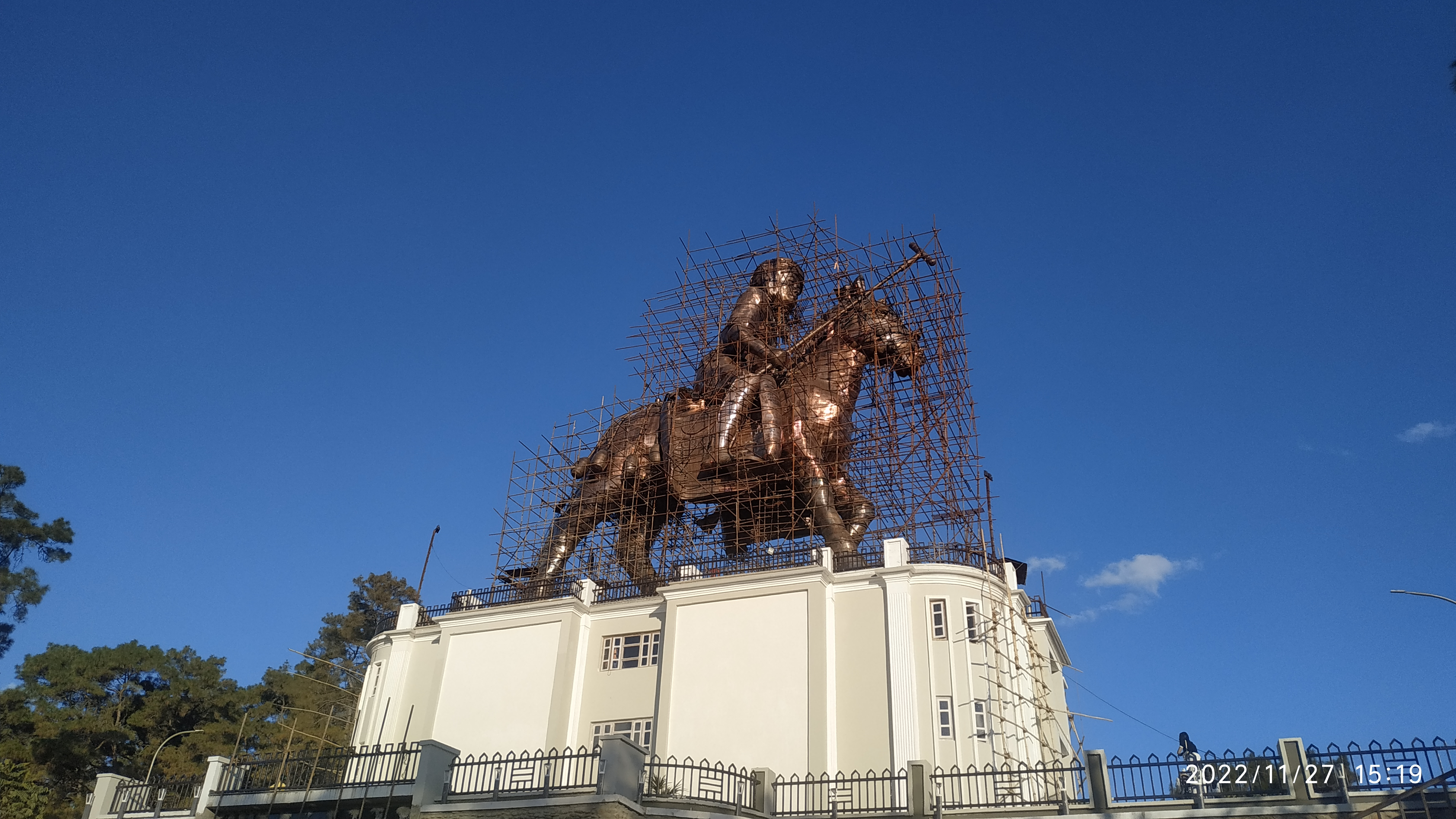
Marjing Polo Statue, the world's tallest polo player statue, standing inside the Marjing Polo Complex, dedicated to God Marjing, the Meitei deity of polo, in the Heingang Ching

Mukna is a popular form of wrestling. Mukna Kangjei, or Khong Kangjei, is a game which combines the arts of mukna (wrestling hockey) and Kangjei (Cane Stick) to play the ball made of seasoned bamboo roots.

Yubi lakpi is a traditional full contact game played in Manipur, India, using a coconut, which has some notable similarities to rugby. Yubi lakpi literally means "coconut snatching". The coconut is greased to make it slippery. There are rules of the game, as with all Manipur sports. The coconut serves the purpose of a ball and is offered to the king, the chief guest or the judges before the game begins. The aim is to run while carrying the greased coconut and physically cross over the goal line, while the other team tackles and blocks any such attempt as well as tries to grab the coconut and score on its own. In Manipur's long history, Yubi lakpi was the annual official game, attended by the king, over the Hindu festival of Shree Govindajee. It is like the game of rugby, or American football.

Oolaobi (Woo-Laobi) is an outdoor game mainly played by females. Meitei mythology believes that UmangLai Heloi-Taret (seven deities–seven fairies) played this game on the Courtyard of the temple of Umang Lai Lairembi. The number of participants is not fixed but are divided into two groups (size as per agreement). Players are divided as into Raiders (Attackers) or Defenders (Avoiders). Hiyang Tannaba, also called Hi Yangba Tanaba, is a traditional boat rowing race and festivity of the Panas.

=== Polo ===
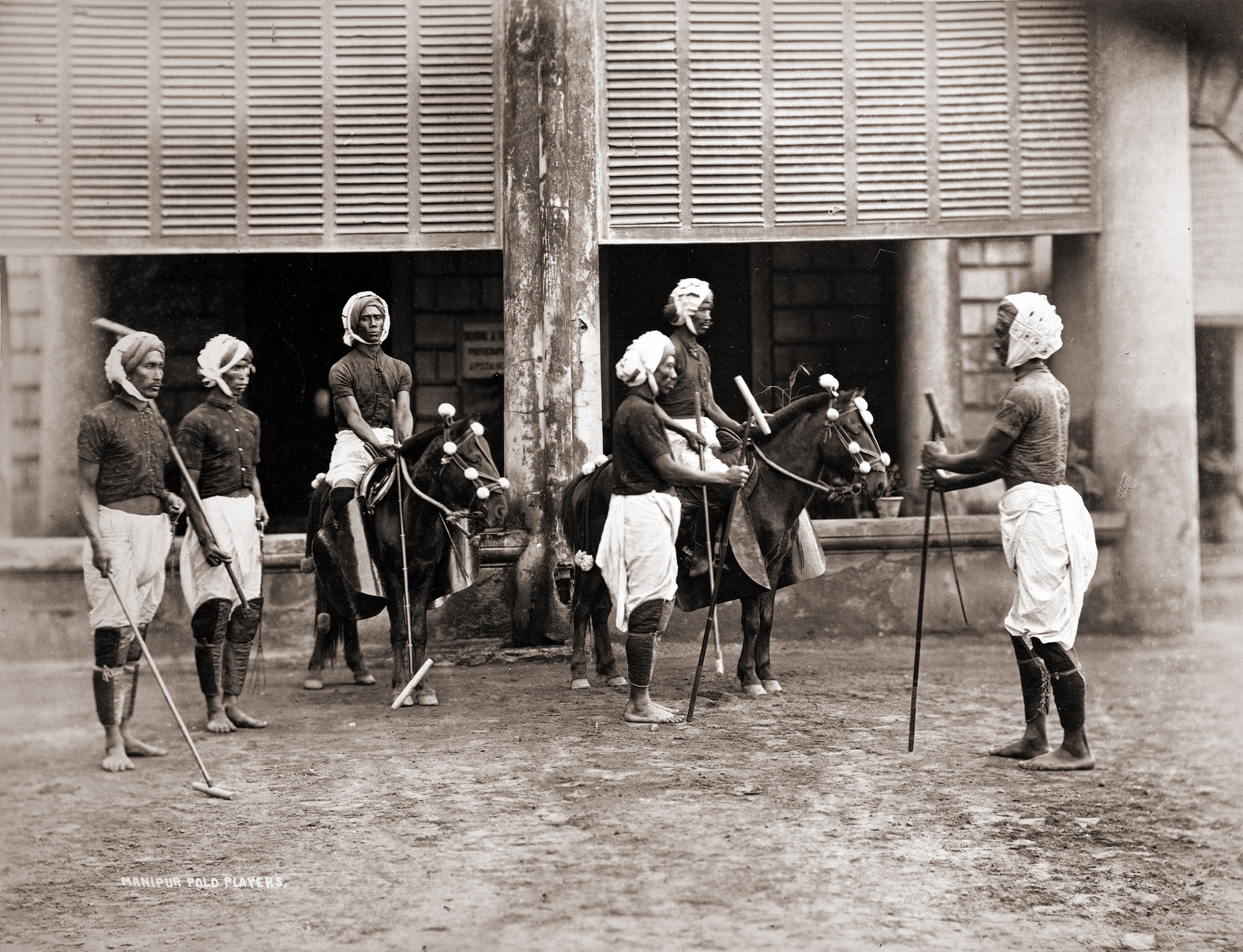
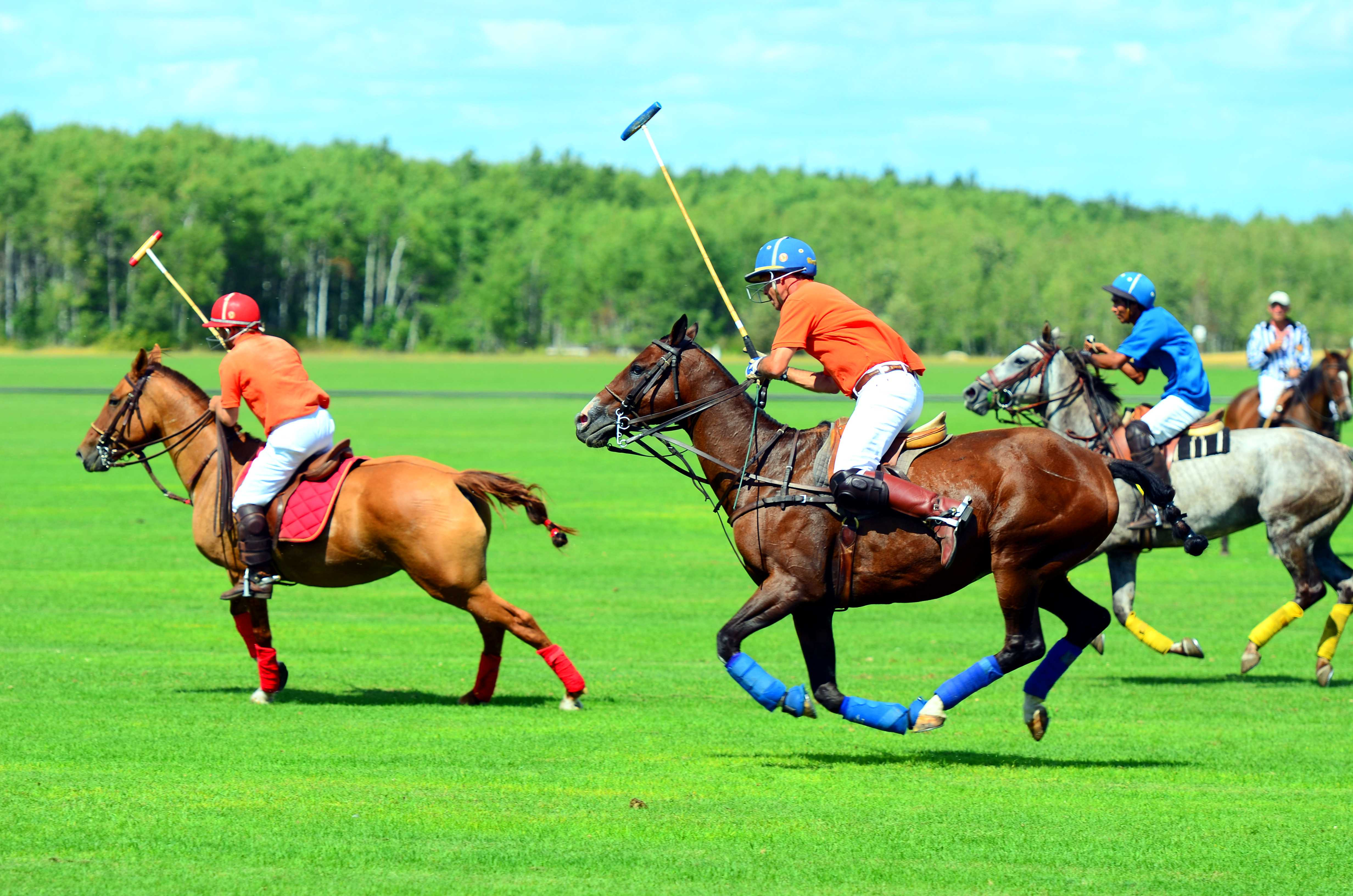
The rules-based Polo game in 19th century Manipur (above), and modern Polo in the 21st century.

The origin of modern polo can be traced to Manipur where the world's oldest polo ground lies, Imphal Polo Ground. Captain Robert Stewart and Lieutenant Joseph Sherer of the British colonial era first watched locals play a rules-based pulu or sagolkangjei (literally, horse and stick) game in 1859. They adopted its rules, calling the game polo, and playing it on their horses. The game spread among the British in Calcutta and then to England.

Apart from these games, some outdoor children's games are fading in popularity. Some games such as Khutlokpi, Phibul Thomba, and Chaphu Thugaibi remain very popular elsewhere, such as in Cambodia. They are played especially during the Khmer New Year.

First of its kind in India, National Sports University will be constructed in Manipur.

== Festivals ==
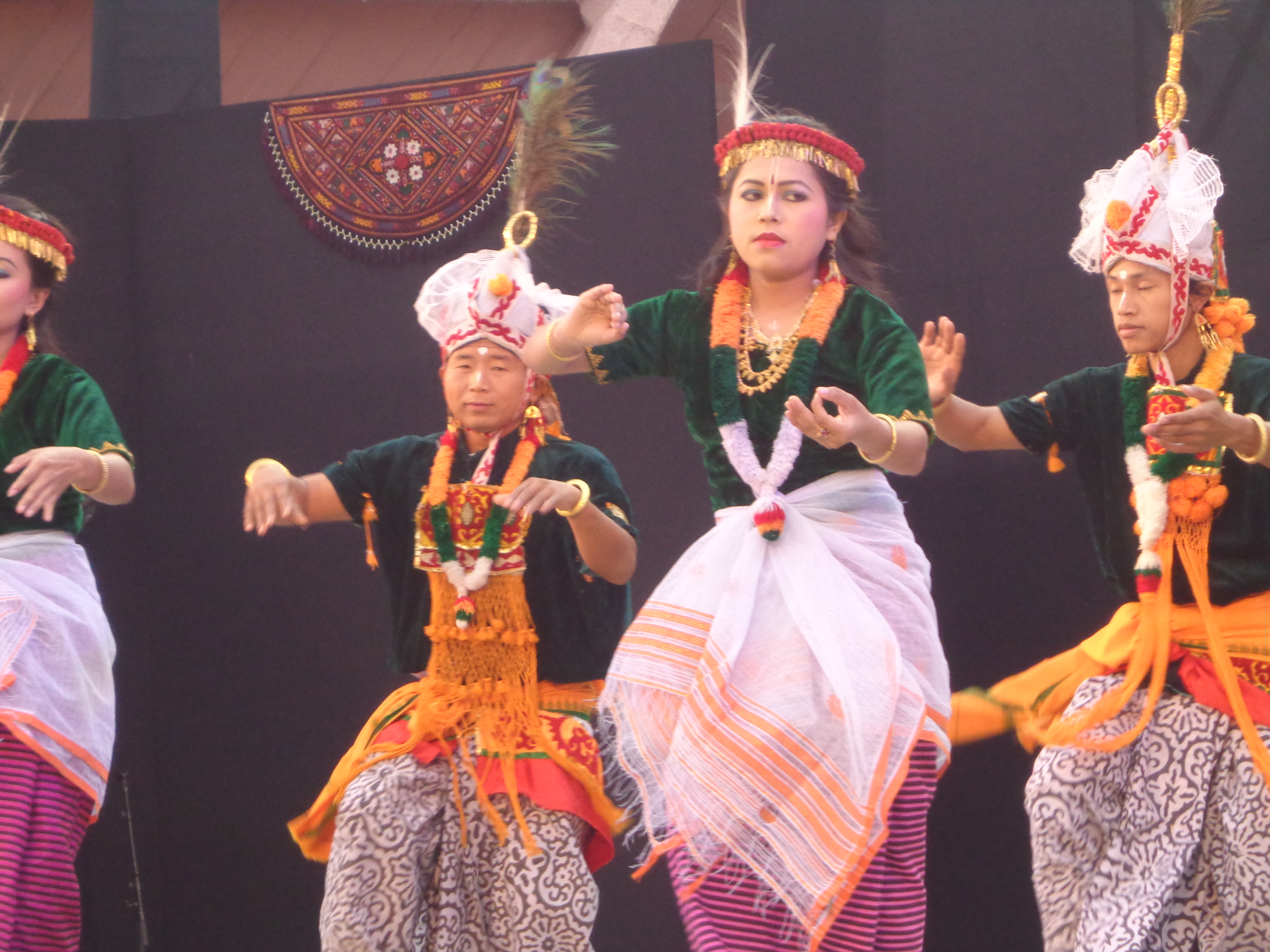
The Lai Haraoba, a dance festival showcases the folk dances of Manipur.

The festivals of Manipur are Lui-ngai-ni Ningol Chakouba, Shirui Lily festival, Yaoshang, Gan-ngai, Chumpha, Cheiraoba, Kang and Heikru Hidongba, as well as the broader religious festivals Eid-Ul-Fitr, Eid-Ul-Adha and Christmas. Most of these festivals are celebrated on the basis of the lunar calendar. Almost every festival celebrated in other states of India is observed.

On 21 November 2017, the Sangai Festival 2017 was inaugurated by President Ram Nath Kovind in Manipur. Held for 10 days, the festival is named after Manipur's state animal, the brow-antlered Sangai deer. The Sangai Festival showcases the tourism potential of Manipur in the field of arts and culture, handloom, handicrafts, indigenous sports, cuisine, music and adventure sports.

=== Sangai festival ===
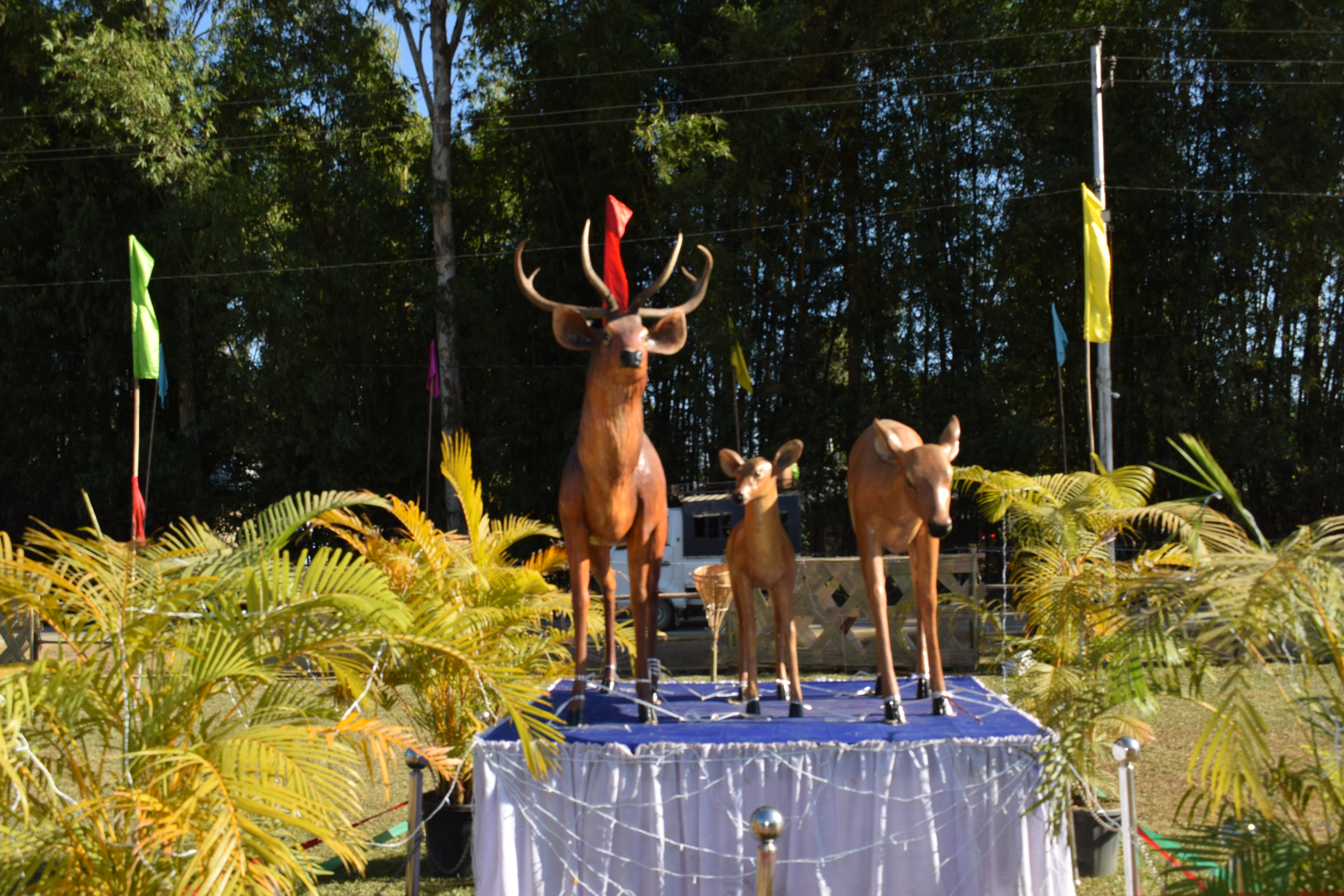
Sangai Deer Replica at Sangai Festival Manipur

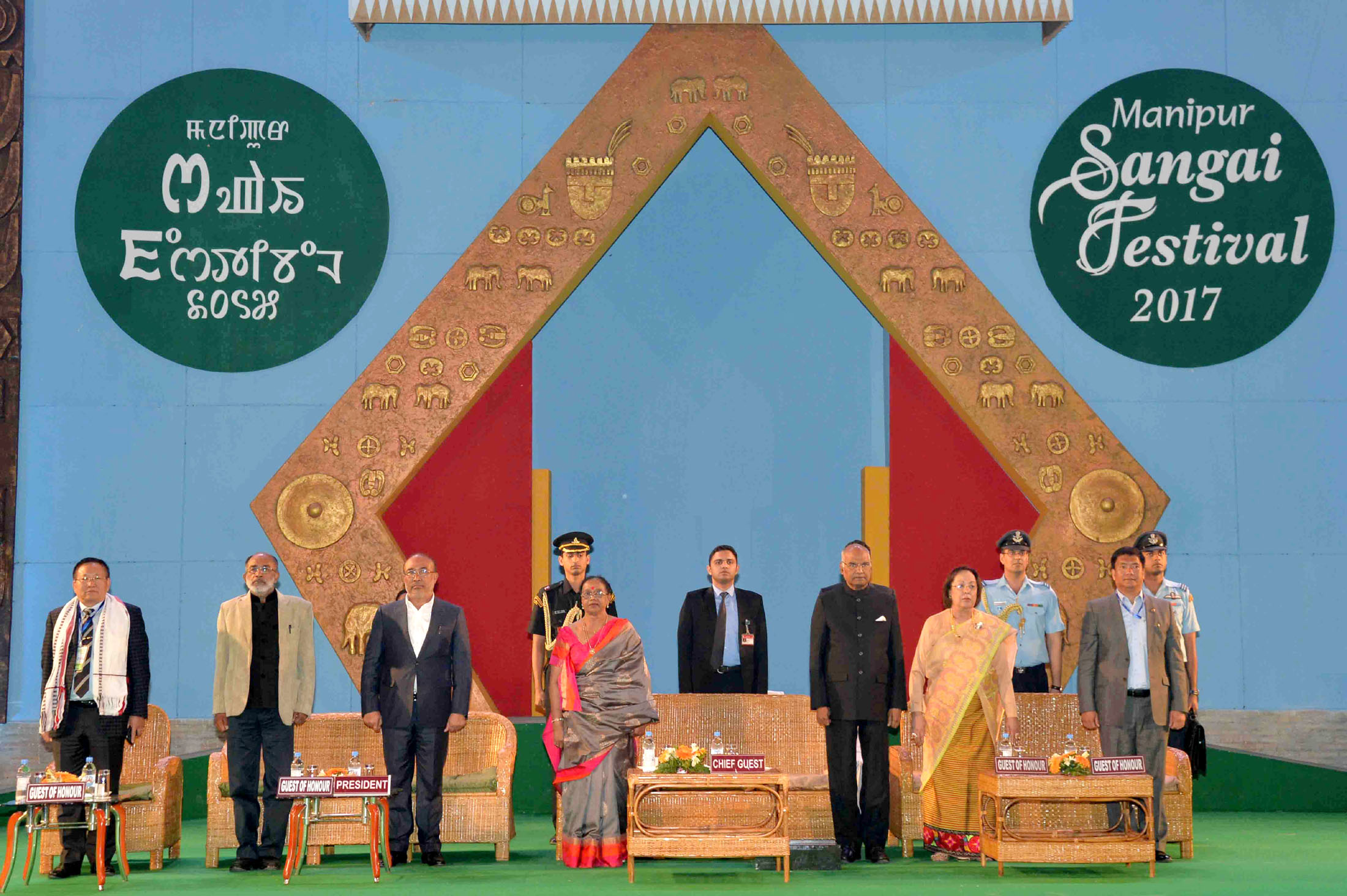
Ram Nath Kovind at the inaugural event of ‘Manipur Sangai Festival 2017’

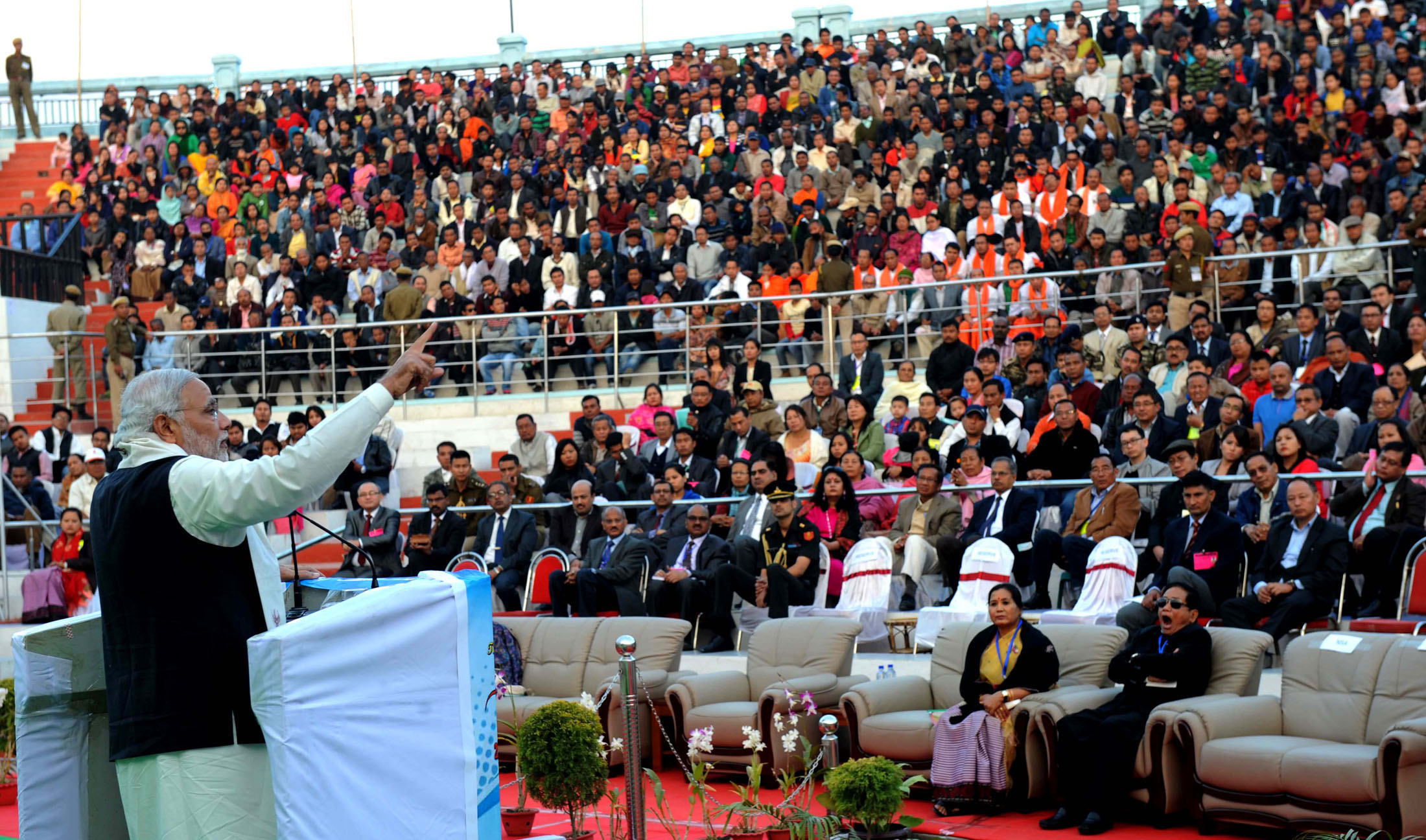
Narendra Modi giving an address at the closing function of the Sangai Festival, 2014

Sangai Festival (Meitei: Sangai Kumhei) is an annual cultural festival organised by Manipur Tourism Department every year from 21 to 30 November. Even though many editions of this Festival has been celebrated over the past few years with the name of Tourism Festival, since 2010 this has been renamed as the Sangai Festival to stage the uniqueness of the shy and gentle brow-antlered deer popularly known as the Sangai, a regional name given to this rare species of deer. It is the state animal of Manipur. As this festival is being celebrated to promote Manipur as a world class tourism destination, it showcases the states contributions to art and culture, handloom, handicrafts, fine arts, indigenous sports, cuisine, music and adventure sports, as well as the natural environment. it is celebrated in different parts mainly in the valley areas of imphal.Now expanded to hills district of Manipur, Senapati and Tamelong district.Many tourists come from all over the world and represent their craft making. Many people have also started to talk about the way Sangai festival is celebrated. They say that it should be celebrated only in one place with a proper arrangement and with big budget so that this festival grows more bigger and unique and spread all over the world.

=== Ningol Chakouba ===
Held on 9 November, this is a social festival of the Meitei people of Manipur where married women (Ningol) are invited (Chakouba, literally calling to a meal; for dinner or lunch) to a feast at their parental house accompanied by their children. Besides the feast, gifts are given to the women/invitees and to their children. It is the festival that binds and revives the family relations between the women married away and the parental family. Nowadays, other communities have started celebrating this kind of a family-bonding festival.

=== Kut ===
Held after the Harvest festival in November, this festival predominantly celebrated by Kuki-Chin-Mizo tribes in Manipur has become one of the leading festivals of the state. Kut is not restricted to a community or tribe — the whole state populace participates in merriment. On 1 November of every year, the state declared holiday for Kut celebration.

=== Yaosang ===
Held in February or March, Yaosang is considered to be one of the biggest festivals of Manipur. It is the Holi festival (festival of colour) but Yaosang is the regional name given by the people of Manipur.

=== Khuado Pawi ===
Khuado Pawi is the harvest festival of the Tedim people who were recognised as Sukte and Zomi in India and Myanmar respectively. The word Pawi means festival in Tedim Zomi language. It is celebrated every year in the month of September–October after harvesting.

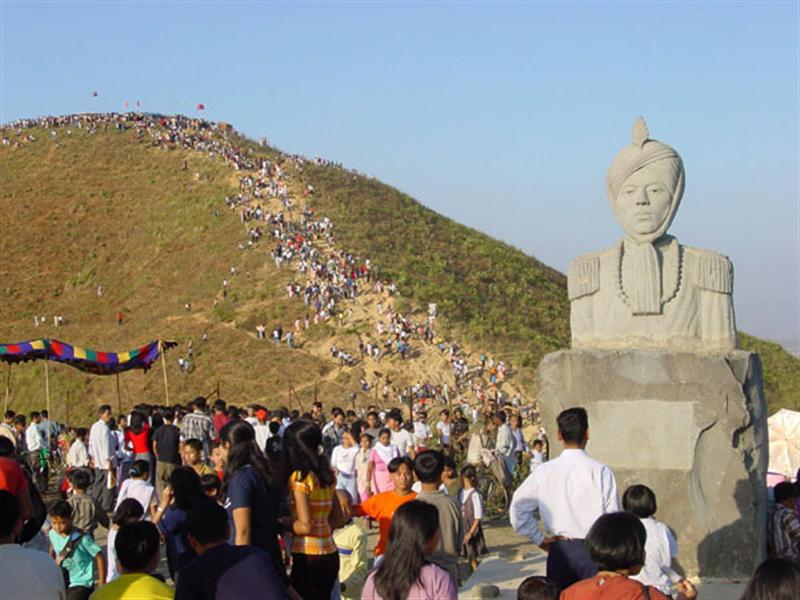
Cheiraoba is a celebration of the new year during the spring season. People feast (top), then climb up a hill together later in the day to signify overcoming hurdles and reaching new heights in the new year.

=== Cheiraoba ===
Also known as Sajibugi Nongma Panba and held in March or April, Cheiraoba is the new year of Manipur. It is observed on the first lunar day of the lunar month Sajibu (March/April) and so it is also popularly known as Sajibu Cheiraoba. People of Manipur immaculate and decorate their houses and make a sumptuous variety of dishes to feast upon after offering food to the deity on this day. After the feast, as a part of the ritual, people climb hilltops; in the belief that it would excel them to greater heights in their worldly life.

== Notable people ==
- Mary Kom

== Geographical indication ==
=== Chak-Hao (Black rice) ===
Chak-Hao was awarded the Geographical Indication (GI) status tag from the Geographical Indications Registry, under the Union Government of India, on 20 April 2020 and is valid until 25 December 2027.

Consortium of Producers of Chak-Hao (Black Rice) from Imphal, proposed the GI registration of Chak-Hao. After filing the application in December 2017, the rice was granted the GI tag in 2020 by the Geographical Indication Registry in Chennai, making the name "Chak-Hao" exclusive to the rice grown in the region. It thus became the first rice variety from Manipur and Nagaland. It also is the 5th type of goods from Manipur and 4th from Nagaland to earn the GI tag respectively.

The GI tag protects the rice from illegal selling and marketing, and gives it legal protection and a unique identity.

== See also ==
- Insurgency in Manipur
- Human rights abuses in Manipur
- Outline of Manipur
- Tourist Attractions in Manipur

== Footnotes ==
Muslim population among Scheduled Tribes in Manipur
Tribe	2001			2011		
Tribe	Total Muslims	🚹	🚺	Total Muslims	🚹	🚺
Aimol	4	1	3	15	6	9
Anal	110	57	53	74	31	43
Angami	1	1	0	0	0	0
Chiru	24	14	10	62	25	37
Chothe	6	2	4	5	1	4
Gangte	35	21	14	101	52	49
Hmar	300	153	147	226	109	117
Kabui	602	310	292	376	183	193
Kacha Naga	280	148	132	208	103	105
Koirao	7	4	3	34	15	19
Koireng	6	2	4	6	1	5
Kom	94	55	39	47	22	25
Lamgang	29	15	14	19	9	10
Mao	23	15	8	243	121	122
Maram	0	0	0	78	39	39
Maring	82	39	43	77	43	34
Any Mizo (Lushai) tribes etc.	56	32	24	19	10	9
Monsang	24	16	8	9	6	3
Moyon	11	7	4	2	0	2
Paite	177	92	85	268	127	141
