= Irom Sharmila Chanu =

Indian civil rights activist

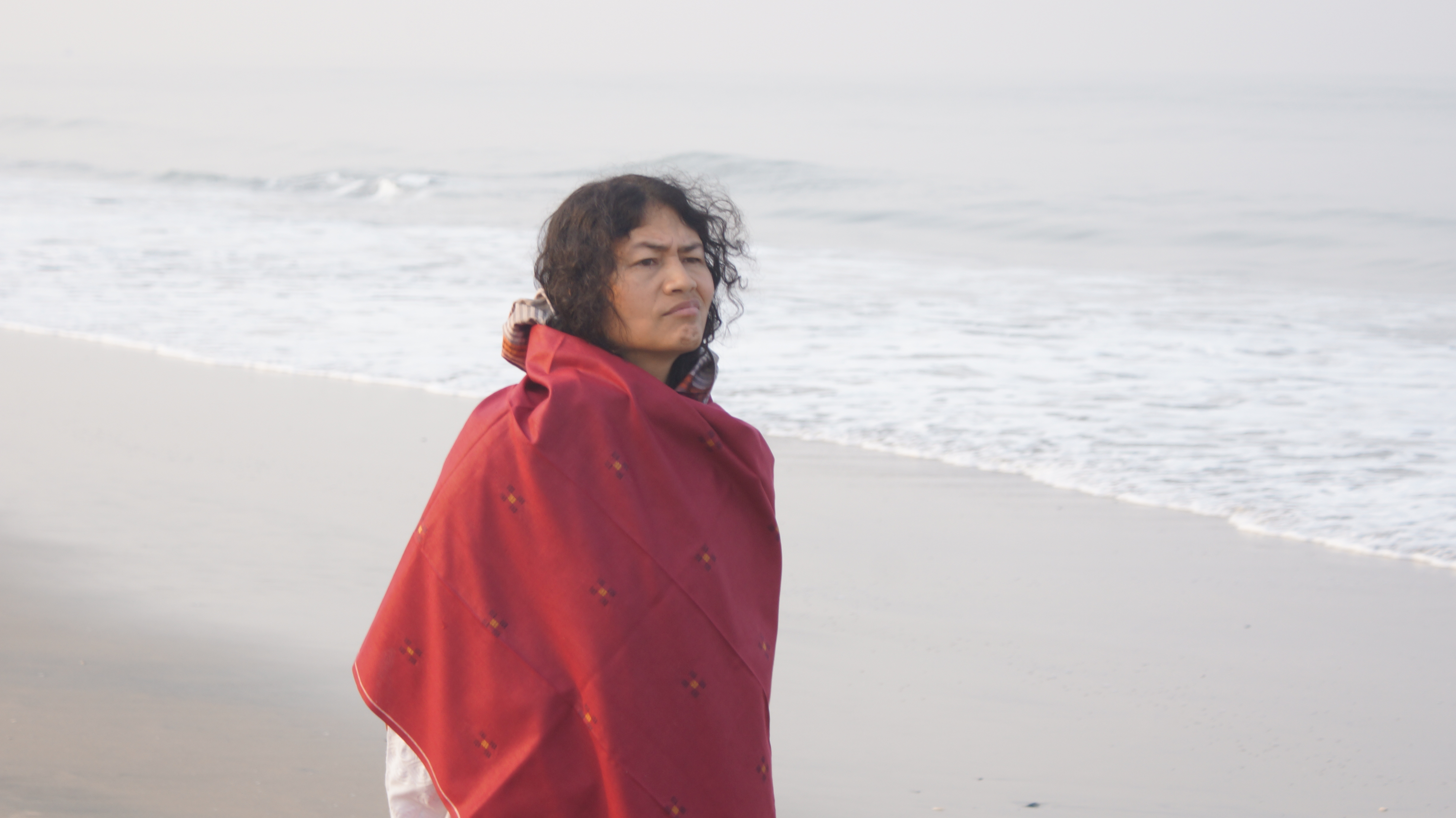
- Irom Sharmila at a reception given by Solidarity Youth Movement to her in Kozhikode
- Born: 14 March 1972 (age 54); Kongpal, Imphal, Manipur, India
- Occupations: Civil rights activist, political activist, poet
- Known for: Hunger strike against Armed Forces (Special Powers) Act
- Political party: India Greens Party
- Spouse: Desmond Anthony Bellarnine Coutinho (m. 2017)
- Children: Nix Shakhi and Autumn Tara
- Parent(s): Irom c Nanda (father); Irom Ongbi Sakhi (mother)
- Awards: Gwangju Prize for Human Rights

Irom Sharmila Chanu (born 14 March 1972), also known as the "Iron Lady of Manipur" or "Mengoubi" ("the fair one") is an Indian civil rights activist and poet from the state of Manipur. In 2000, she began a hunger strike to abolish the Armed Forces (Special Powers) Act, 1958. She ended her intermittent fast in 2016, after being force-fed for over 500 weeks in custody. Amnesty International has declared her a prisoner of conscience.

== Early life ==
Born on 14 March 1972 in Imphal to Nanda, an attendant in the state veterinary hospital, and Sakhi, a housewife. Sharmila was the ninth child, and her mother was 44 years when she gave birth to her. Her mother had problems with breastfeeding her, and she was suckled by women in the neighbourhood. As an average student, Sharmila would stay aloof from most of the 17-member strong joint family that she grew up with.

She completed high school studies in 1991. She took short-term courses in shorthand, typing, tailoring, and journalism. She worked with different organisations to gain to understand abuse in Manipur.

== Activism ==
In September 2000, she applied for an internship with Human Rights Alert (HRA), a non-governmental organisation working in Manipur, documenting human rights violations. She joined the organisation at the age of 36 and assisted Babloo Loitongbam, lawyer and founder of the organisation.

She documented human rights abuse in Manipur. She became part of HRA's preparatory committee for a citizen's inquiry on the impact of AFSPA. The inquiry was headed by Hosbet Suresh, former judge of the Bombay High Court. Sharmila spoke to survivors of gang rapes, and relatives of people killed by the Indian armed forces. These cases received protection against prosecution because of the Armed Forces (Special Powers) Act.

On 2 November 2000, in Malom, a town in the Imphal Valley of Manipur, ten civilians were shot and killed while waiting at a bus stop. It was allegedly committed by the Assam Rifles. The victims included a 62-year-old woman and 18-year-old Sinam Chandramani, a 1998 National Bravery Award winner. On 5 November, Sharmila sat under a shelter near the site of the killings with a placard, announcing she was fasting until Afspa was repealed.

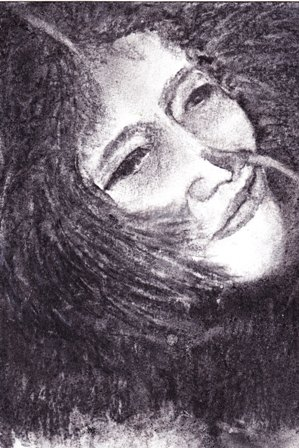
Charcoal portrait of Irom Sharmila with her nasogastric tube by Amitabh Mitra

Her primary demand to the Indian government was the repeal of the Armed Forces (Special Powers) Act (AFSPA). Three days after she began her strike, she was arrested by the police and charged with an "attempt to commit suicide", which was unlawful under the Indian Penal Code (IPC), and transferred to judicial custody. Nasogastric intubation was forced on her from 21 November in order to keep her alive.

Sharmila has been regularly released and re-arrested every year since her hunger strike began.

By 2004, Sharmila was said to be an "icon of public resistance." Following her procedural release on 2 October 2006 Sharmila went to Raj Ghat, New Delhi, which she said was "to pay floral tribute to my idol, Mahatma Gandhi." Later that evening, Sharmila headed for Jantar Mantar for a protest where she was joined by other concerned citizens. On 6 October, she was re-arrested by the Delhi police for attempting suicide and was taken to the All India Institute of Medical Sciences, where she wrote letters to the Prime Minister, the President, and the Home Minister. At this time, she met and won the support of Nobel-laureate Shirin Ebadi, who promised to take up Sharmila's cause at the United Nations Human Rights Council.

In 2011, anti-corruption activist Anna Hazare, sent two representatives to meet her.

In September 2011, Communist Party of India (Marxist–Leninist) (CPI ML) stated its support for her and for repeal of AFSPA.

Following that in October 2011, the Manipur Pradesh All India Trinamool Congress announced their support for Sharmila and called on party chief Mamata Banerjee to help repeal the AFSPA. Then in November, at the end of the eleventh year of her fast, Sharmila again called on Prime Minister Manmohan Singh to repeal the law. On 3 November 100 women formed a human chain in Ambari to show support for Sharmila, while other civil society groups staged a 24-hour fast in a show of solidarity.

In 2011 the Save Sharmila Solidarity Campaign (SSSC) was launched to highlight Sharmila's struggle and in December 2011, Pune University announced a scholarship program for 39 female Manipuri students to take degree courses in honour of Sharmila's 39 years of age.

She only met her mother once during the fast, as she believed that seeing her mother's anguish might have broken her resolve. She said "The day AFSPA is repealed I will eat rice from my mother's hand."

On 28 March 2016, she was released from judicial custody as charges against her were rejected by a local court in Imphal. Sharmila kept her vow of neither entering her house nor meeting her mother until the government repeals AFSPA and went to continue her fast at Shahid Minar, Imphal on the same day of her release. She was again arrested by the police under the same charge of attempt to commit suicide by means of indefinite fast.

=== End of the fast ===
On 26 July 2016, Sharmila, who had been on an intermittent hunger strike since 2000, announced that she would end her fast on 9 August 2017 and she would contest the next state elections in Manipur. She said "I will join politics and my fight will continue."

=== International attention ===
Sharmila was awarded the 2007 Gwangju Prize for Human Rights, which is given to "an outstanding person or group, active in the promotion and advocacy of Peace, Democracy and Human Rights". She shared the award with Lenin Raghuvanshi of People's Vigilance Committee on Human Rights, a northeastern Indian human rights organisation. In 2009, she was awarded the first Mayilamma Award of the Mayilamma Foundation "for achievement of her nonviolent struggle in Manipur".

In 2010, she won a lifetime achievement award from the Asian Human Rights Commission. Later that year, she won the Rabindranath Tagore Peace Prize of the Indian Institute of Planning and Management, which came with a cash award of 5,100,000 rupees, and the Sarva Gunah Sampannah "Award for Peace and Harmony" from the Signature Training Centre.

In 2013, Amnesty International declared her a Prisoner of conscience, and said she "is being held solely for a peaceful expression of her beliefs."

== Subsequent work ==
In October 2016, she launched a political party named Peoples' Resurgence and Justice Alliance to contest two Assembly constituencies of Khurai and Khangabok. Khangabok is the home constituency of Chief Minister Okram Ibobi Singh. In the 2017 Manipur Legislative Assembly election Sharmila received 90 votes; the fewest of the five candidates.

In February 2018 she was invited to take part in the annual Calcutta Soi Boi Mela where She made contact with many older activists some of whom have since died.

In 2019, after the death of Gauri Lankesh, Sharmila criticized the NDA government, accusing it of disregarding people's sentiments when making policy decisions. In an interview with The Economic Times, she mentioned that she was no more interested in politics as she already experienced electoral politics and the dirtiness involved in the process.

In the summer of 2022 Sharmila was invited to attend the Bangalore Literature Festival where she was allowed by the organizers to speak on behalf of the Telugu poet and academic Varavara "VV" Rao who was then under house arrest in a state far from where he and his family lived. She was able to bring half a dozen books signed by the authors at the festival when she met VV in Mumbai where he remains detained without trial.

In the Autumn of 2023 she had been invited to the second Kerala state books festival via MLAs of the State communist party.

The invitation was subsequently withdrawn after she informed them that she would reprise what she had done at the Bangalore Literature Festival the year before.

After the MHA tweeted removal of the AFSPA from swathes of the North East the Chief Minister of Manipur called for a day of celebration to which he would invite Irom Sharmila as a guest.

== In popular culture ==
Deepti Priya Mehrotra's Burning Bright: Irom Sharmila and the Struggle for Peace in Manipur details Sharmila's life and the political background of her fast. IronIrom: Two Journeys : Where the Abnormal is Normal (2012, with Minnie Vaid and Tayenjam Bijoykumar Singh)

Ojas S V, a theater artist from Pune, performed a mono-play titled Le Mashale ("Take the Torch"), based on Irom Sharmila's life and struggle. It is an adaptation of Meira Paibi (Women bearing torches), a drama written by Malayalam playwright Civic Chandran. The play was performed in several Indian states.

== Personal life ==
On Thursday 17 August 2017, Irom Sharmila Chanu married her British partner Desmond Anthony Bellarnine Coutinho in Kodaikanal, a hill station in Tamil Nadu. On Sunday 12 May 2019, at the age of 47, she gave birth to twin daughters in Bengaluru, Karnataka, named Nix Shakhi and Autumn Tara.

== See also ==
- Indian general election, 2014 (Manipur)
- Insurgency in Manipur
- Armed Forces (Special Powers) Act
- Human rights abuses in Manipur

== Bibliography ==
- Fragrance of Peace (2010)
- IronIrom: Two Journeys: Where the abnormal is norm
