= People's Resurgence and Justice Alliance =

- Founder: Irom Sharmila
- Founded: 9 August 2016 (10 years ago)
- Headquarters: Imphal
- ECI status: Recognised Regional Political Party
- Seats in: 0 / 60

Website
- http://prja.in/

The People's Resurgence and Justice Alliance (PRAJA) is a political party in the Indian state of Manipur. The party was founded in 2016 by Irom Sharmila, as a co-convener. The convener Erendro Leichombam has a Masters in Public Administration from Harvard University and is a former consultant with the UNDP.

The party was launched after the ending of a hunger strike by Irom Sharmila on 9 August 2016, which had lasted for 16 years of fasting. The major aim of the party is to end the Armed Forces (Special Powers) Act in the state of Manipur. and Bring Clean Politics to the state of Manipur.

In 2017, the party contested two Assembly constituencies of Khurai and Khangabok. Khangabok is the home constituency of Chief Minister Okram Ibobi Singh. In the 2017 Manipur Legislative Assembly election, the winner in Thoubal, Ibobi Singh, received 18,649 votes and Sharmilla received 90 votes, the fewest of the five candidates.
