= Lenin Raghuvanshi =

Indian activist, political thinker and social entrepreneur

- लेनिन रघुवंशी
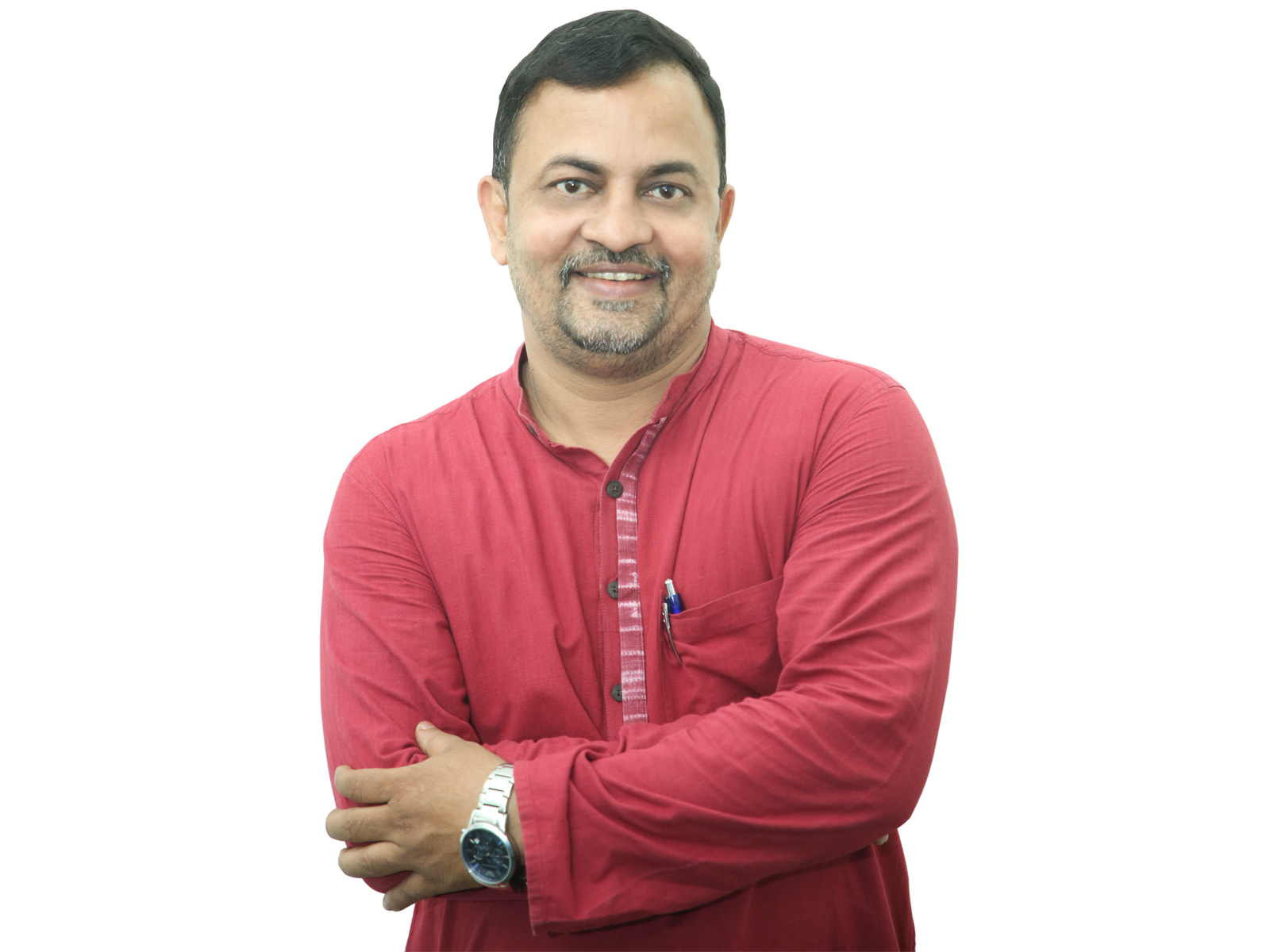
- Born: 18 May 1970 (age 56); Varanasi, India
- Other name: संजय
- Citizenship: Indian
- Education: Bachelor degree in Ayurveda, Modern Medicine and Surgery (1994)
- Alma mater: State College for Ayurveda and Medicine, Gurukul Kangari, Haridwar
- Occupation: Social activist
- Known for: People's Vigilance Committee on Human Rights (PVCHR)
- Title: Dr
- Partner: Shruti Nagvanshi
- Children: Kabeer Karunik
- Parent(s): Surendra Nath Singh (Father); Late Shrimati Savitri Devi(Mother)
- Awards: M.A. Thomas National Human Rights Award 2016, Karamveer Award 2012, Human Rights Award of the city of Weimar (2010), Gwangju Human Rights Award (2007), ACHA Peace Star Award
- Website: www.pvchr.asia www.pvchr.blogspot.com leninraghuvanshi.com janmitranyas.in www.leninraghuvanshiofkashi.com

Signature
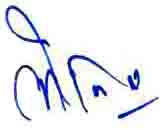

Lenin Raghuvanshi (born 18 May 1970) is an Indian Dalit rights activist, political thinker and social entrepreneur. He is one of the founding members of People's Vigilance Committee on Human Rights (PVCHR), which works for the upliftment of the marginalised sections of the society. His work has been recognized with awards like Gwangju Human Rights Award (2007), the ACHA Star Peace award (2008), the International Human Rights Prize of the city of Weimar (2010), Special Mentions Prize of Human Rights of The French Republic (2018), Public Peace Prize(2018) and Karmaveer Maharatna Award (2019). He nominated for the Nobel Peace Prize for his efforts to combat masculinity driven militarist traditions, for his contribution to bettering conditions for peace in world and for acting as a driving force in efforts to prevent the use of masculinity driven militarist traditions as a weapon of war and conflict. His childhood learning on hegemonic masculinity has been acknowledged by film actor Aamir Khan and he has been invited to participate in Satyamev Jayate TV series, a TV show hosted by Aamir Khan that discussed issue of violence and hegemonic masculinity that went on air in 2014.

== Personal life ==
Lenin Raghuvanshi was born in a higher caste Hindu family, to Surendra Nath Singh and Shrimati Savitri Devi, on 18 May 1970. His grandfather Shanti Kumar Singh, was a Gandhian freedom fighter. He did his bachelor's course in Ayurveda, Modern Medicine and Surgery from the State Ayurvedic Medical College, Gurukul Kangari, Haridwar in 1994. Lenin married Shruti Nagvanshi, a famous social activist on 22 February 1992 and has a son, Kabeer Karunik, who is national level snooker player. Both he and Shruti are converts to Buddhism.

== Initial years ==
From the beginning, Raghuvanshi was averse to the caste system. He refers to his higher caste Hindu upbringing as "feudal". This sprung the seed of social activism in him. He became the president of the Uttar Pradesh chapter of United Nations Youth Organisation at the age of 23 (1993).

With his exposure into the mainstream society, he realised that casteism is present in all walks of life. With the Indian Government tackling the issue with its reservation policies and making it perennial, Raghuvanshi chose the path of uplifting them by making their voices heard. He founded the People's Vigilance Committee on Human Rights (PVCHR) in 1996, along with his life partner Shruti Nagvanshi, historian Mahendra Pratap, musician Vikash Maharaj, and poet Gyanedra Pati.

== On bonded labour and children's right to education ==
In 1999, Raghuvanshi founded a community-based organisation, Jan Mitra Nyas (People-friendly Association), which was backed by ActionAid. The movement adopted three villages near Varanasi and an urban slum, with an objective of providing better education to the children there. He was elected in 2001 into the executive council of Voice of People, supported by Child Rights and You (CRY), an organisation active in 15 districts of Uttar Pradesh, which works for the rights of the children.

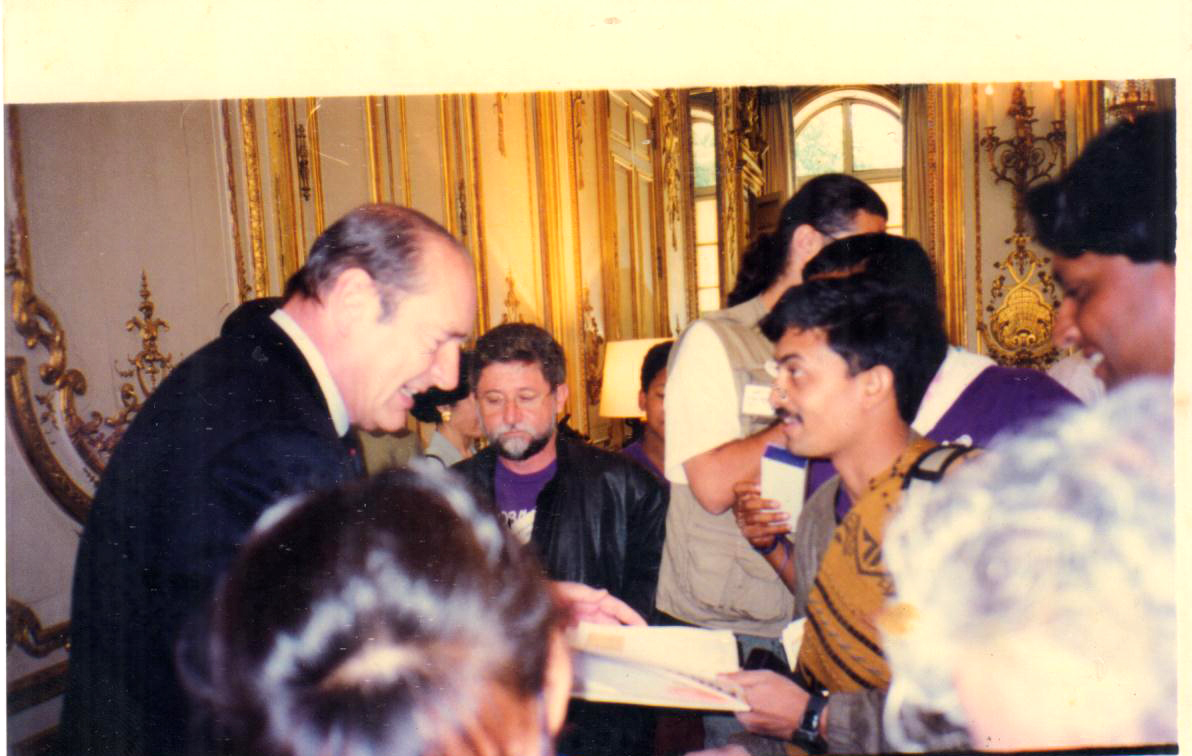
Presented a poem on child labor and football to French President Jacques Chirac during the Global March Against Child Labor in 1998.

He was appointed as a member of the District Vigilance Committee on Bonded Labour under Bonded Labour abolition Act 1976 by the Governor of UP in 2002. He filed an FIR (First Information Report) against Rajendar Thripathi, the village head of Belwa in the Badagaon block of Varanasi administrative district in his capacity as a member of the District Vigilance Committee. However, Rajendar escaped arrest, and Lenin has been reported to be receiving death threats since then. In revenge, the head of Belwa village filed a case against Raghuvanshi and two PVCHR staff members for "statements conducing to public mischief" and "anti-state activities"; the latter proceeding of case was stayed by High Court.

In 2004, he conceptualised the 'Jan Mitra Gaon' (People-friendly villages) project, under which three villages and an urban slum were adopted with the motives of eradicating child labour, providing education to girls, reintroducing non-traditional education and improving the state of educational institutions.

== Contributions to the Weavers Community ==
Raghuvanshi represented the Bunkar Dastkar Adhikar Manch in the People's Tribunal on Human Rights, chaired by Sayeda Hameed, a member of the Planning Commission of India, briefing on the reportedly poor situation of the Varanasi weavers. Bunkar Dastkar Adhikar Manch is a Varanasi-based outfit, founded by Siddiq Hassan, in 2004, that lobbies for the weaver community. Varanasi Weavers Trust was conceptualised in 2004 by the Sri Lankan economist Darin Gunasekara and Raguvansi, with the objective of easy accessibility of the capital and market to the poor in a democratised way. The demand was then put forth to the Indian Government for the establishment of the trust.

== Bringing together the South Asian countries ==
On 15 January 2005, human rights groups from India, Nepal, Bhutan, Bangladesh, and Sri Lanka, PVCHR (India), INSEC (Nepal), People's Forum for Human Rights (Bhutan), Human Rights Commission of Pakistan, LOKOJ (Bangladesh), and Wiros Lokh Institute (Sri Lanka), met with an objective of a united South Asia, working for the common good, in Kathmandu. This convention was named People's SAARC, leading to the formation of a South Asian People's Forum, with Raghuvanshi as its coordinator. Afghanistan was later added to this SAARC. This was in an effort to build human rights mechanism in SARRC countries where the discourse of human rights is still in its nascent stage.

== Social justice through the Neo-Dalit Movement ==
Raghuvanshi has called for the establishment of a neo-Dalit movement to eliminate the caste system and overthrow feudalism, thereby establishing a society based on equal dignity for all humankind. The neo-Dalit movement – combining Shudras and ati-Shudras (dalits of all kinds) from all regions – would formulate a popular movement against the ‘culture of impunity’ and the existing caste system.

== Recognition ==
Raghuvanshi is a 2001 Ashoka Fellow. He was appointed as the state director for the European Union funded National Project on Prevention of Torture in 2006, in recognition of the reports published by PVCHR on torture incidents in the state. He drafted a Testimonial model for India along with Dr. Inger Agger, working further on dealing with torture. He was awarded the Gwangju Human Rights Award in 2007, along with Irom Sharmila.

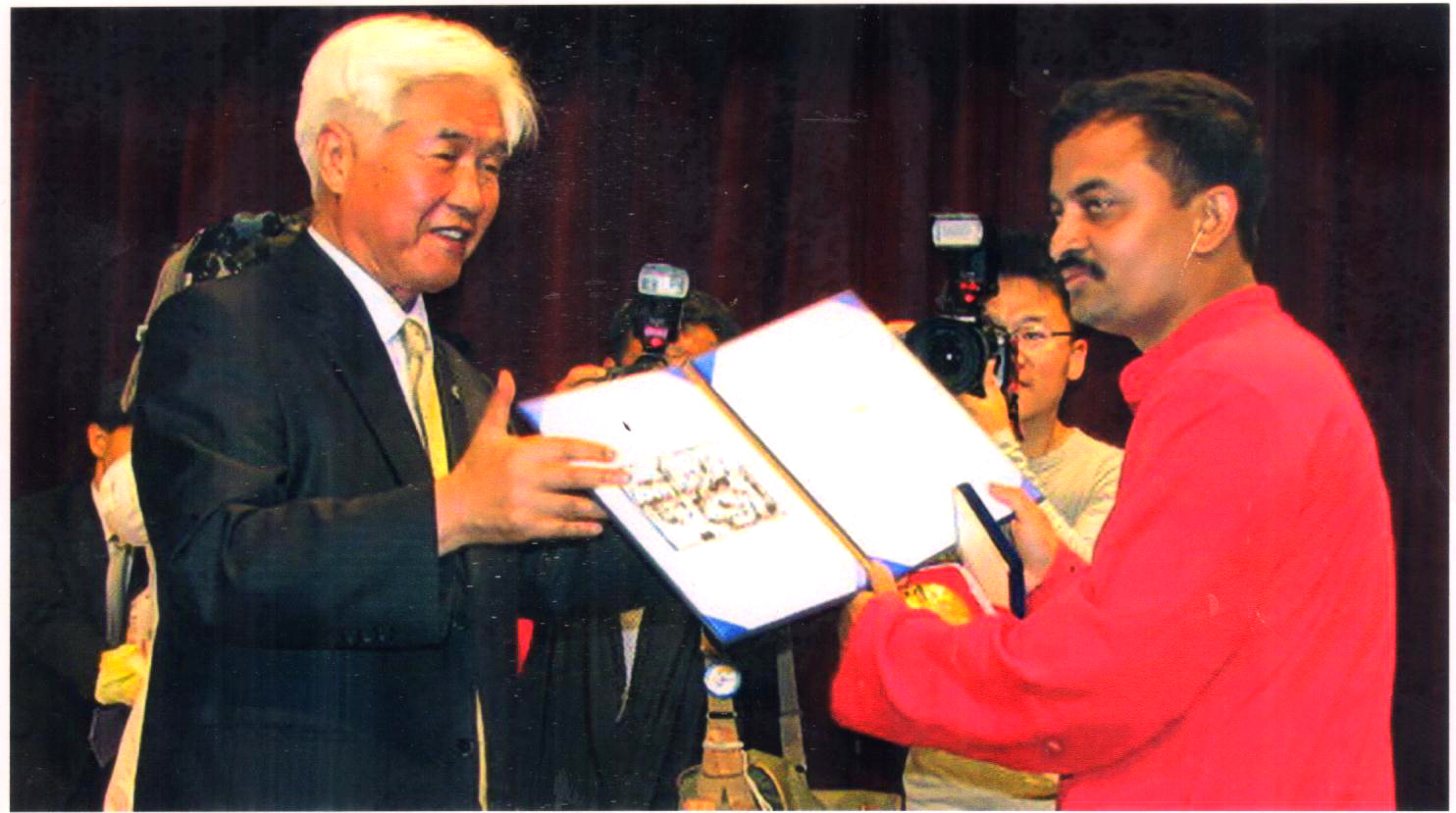
Lenin Raghuvanshi received the Gwangju Human Rights Award in South Korea in 2007

In 2008, he received ACHA Star Peace award from Association for Communal Harmony in Asia USA along with B. M. Kutty, Karamat Ali and Mubashir Mirza from Pakistan. In 2010, he was elected as the president for the Association of Cultural Harmony in Asia, USA. The City Council of Weimar, Germany, chose him for the 2010 International Human Rights award. He was appointed as the member of NGO core Committee of National Human Rights Commission (NHRC) in 2012, in recognition of his tireless work for human rights. In 2015, Lenin was invited at the Global Tolerance Forum in Drammen, Norway where he voiced his strong opinion on the contemporary political situation in India, showed deep concern about increasing hold of fundamentalist and extremists elements in Indian society. Dr. Lenin was awarded M.A. Thomas National Human Rights Award, 2016 for his contribution in struggle for the rights of marginalized community, particularly the dalits and adivasis. Recognizing his contribution for the promotion and protection of the children's rights, Wockhardt foundation selected him as a Child Rights Activist of the year in a nationwide online voting. In 2016, Lenin was selected member of Global India-an Ireland-based Horizon 2020 funded Marie Sklodowska-Curie European Training Network.The network is composed of 6 different EU Universities and has 9 partners in India. In September 2017, India Times listed Raghuvanshi as one of the 11 Human Rights Activists in India whose Life Mission is to provide others With A Dignified Life. Daily Indian Media recognized the contribution by Lenin Raghuvanshi along with 12 Indian Stalwarts from various spheres of Indian Life like Politics, Business, Academics and Entertainment at a glittering Awards Ceremony in New Delhi. Those recognized for their contribution to society and championing the cause of equity, humanity, social justice and human welfare. The Deed Indeed Foundation profiled him as 'Tireless Service to Humanity,' stating, "Lenin Raghuvanshi is one of the Caste System’s greatest nemeses and is one of Society’s Downtrodden’s most dynamic champions and we can all take a humane leaf from his book." Lenin has spoken at colleges and universities across the globe. Raghuvanshi has been awarded the following national and international honours since 2018:

- 2026:Donated three major international human rights honours to Bharat Kala Bhavan, Banaras Hindu University (BHU)—the Gwangju Prize for Human Rights(2007) medal, the International Human Rights Prize of the City of Weimar (2010) certificate, and the Human Rights Prize of the French Republic (2018) Special Mention medal and diploma—for public preservation and future research. The honours were presented in the presence of the Vice-Chancellor of Banaras Hindu University.
- 2026: Invited to join the Advisory Board of the Morocco-based international organization Youth for Peace and Dialogue Between Cultures, in recognition of his contributions to human rights, peacebuilding, and social justice.
- 2026:Received the Distinguished Leadership Honour (Unsung Hero category) at the TOI National CSR Summit 2026 for his contributions to grassroots human rights advocacy, social justice, and empowerment of marginalized communities through the People’s Vigilance Committee on Human Rights (PVCHR).
- 2025:Raghuvanshi received the HTDS Millennial Award (2025) for his sustained contribution to human rights advocacy and social justice in India.
- 2025:Featured as a ‘Karnadhar (Leader) of Kashi’ in Sanchiya–Sach ki Awaz for his pioneering contributions to social justice and human rights.
- 2024:Lenin Raghuvanshi, featured in Leonardo Verzaro's anthropological thesis, embodies "resistant vitality," inspiring global scholarship on Dalit rights, storytelling, and transformative activism.
- 2024: Honored with the REX Karmaveer Puraskaar Maharatna Prerna Award for his lifelong commitment to social justice and human rights.
- 2024:Acknowledged as an Honorary Visiting Senior Fellow at IMPRI, a distinguished research think tank, he stands celebrated for his noteworthy contributions to democracy, mobilization, and community building, solidifying his impactful presence in the field.
- 2023: Highest water mark in his achievement to participate as special guest in Bharat Jodo Yatra for plural world on invitation of Rahul Gandhi
- 2022: Aha's Rathasaatchi teaser highlighted unsung heroes like Lenin Raghuvanshi, Charu Majumder, Medha Patkar, Rajendra Singh, Lakshmi Agarwal, Sunitha Krishnan, Appu. The film has been bankrolled by Anitha Mahendran and S Disney.
- 2022:Serving as the Editor-in-Chief of "Reformist Approaches to Human Rights," published by HP Hamilton Publication in the UK
- 2022:Recognized by Senate of Canada as Global Pluralism Awardees,2021
- 2022:Awarded as 2021 Global Pluralism Award Honourable Mentions for an inclusive social movement that challenges the patriarchy and the caste system.
- 2022: Passion Vista profiled as one of the most admired Global Indians
- 2021: On 15 August 2021, India Times Hindi edition listed Raghuvanshi as one of the 11 Human Rights Activists in India whose Life Mission is to provide others With A Dignified Life.
- 2021:Lenin profiled as KBH Heroes by leading Hindi television.
- 2021:He profiled as one Samaritans of India who thrived Pandemic without letting hopes of their people go down!
- 2021:European Union Visitor Program profiled as EUVP WALL OF FAME
- 2020:He profiled as an expert about the current situation around child labour in India amid COVID-19, and what can be done to eradicate it by British Safety Council.
- 2020:Two Dalit rights activists from Varanasi, Uttar Pradesh Mr. Lenin Raghuvanshi and Ms.Shruti Nagvanshi, among others, have been mentioned to “21st Century Heroes of India” from the perspective of Liberty, Equality, Fraternity and other Indian Constitutional Values by Pippa Rann Books & Media, based in the United Kingdom.
- 2020: The Dutch broadcaster Brainwash initiated new online video series Worldly Thinkers. Brainwash is a public service broadcaster for which world famous speakers like Michael Sandel, Louis Theroux and Martha Nussbaum, gave original and inspiring talks. In Worldly Thinkers, thinkers around the world think about and respond to different appealing and urgent theses in seven different episodes, each episode is about 4–5 minutes. Lenin Raghuvanshi has profiled as one of Worldly Thinkers on the issue of Pluralism.
- 2020:Tilaka Manjhi National award by Ang Madad Foundation, a NGO based in Bhagalpur, Bihar
- 2019:Mentioned of his name in ten top futurist activists under TAFFD"s 2019 Nominees by USA based magazine TAFFD"s Transdisciplinary Agora for future discussion. Another important name is Environmental activist Ms.Greta and RTI activist Ms.Aruna Roy.
- 2019:Rotary International's Vocational Excellence Award in recognition of his extraordinary to life skills of youth and children along with Famous Film Director and producer from Bollywood Mr. Raj Kumar Santoshi
- 2019: Karmaveer Maharatna Award
- 2018: Public Peace Prize
- 2018: Special Mentions Prize of Human Rights of The French Republic
- 2018: Bhartiya Manavata Vikas Puraskar

== Literary and academic contribution ==
Lenin frequently contribute articles in local, national and international magazine and online websites. His latest book, Justice, Liberty, Equality: Dalits in Independent India, highlight cases of Dalits atrocities and throw the light on the inability of the administrative system to protect the poor and vulnerable of the Indian society. Book underline failure of Indian human rights system to protect the dignity of Dalits. Lenin, in his high pitch and critical tone, underscores dire need to bring the social change and appeal to bring necessary transformation in the Indian human rights machinery to prevent and redress human rights violations on Dalits and vulnerable people. He was one of a 12-person strong editorial board of Torture for 1998–2020. The Torture Journal is an international scientific journal that provides an interdisciplinary forum for the exchange of original research and systematic reviews by professionals concerned with the biomedical, psychological and social interface of torture and the rehabilitation of its survivors. He became member of advisory board at Journal of Transdisciplinary Peace Praxis (JTPP). He is also member of the IRCT Data and Research Methods Reference Group (Data Reference Group). The feature Chapter ‘Conscientisation of Untouchables in Indian Society’ in book titled 'Consciousness-Raising: Critical pedagogy and practice for social change'edited by Nilan Yu jointly written by Archana Kaushik, Lenin Raghuvanshi and Mohanlal Panda published by Routledge, an imprint of the Taylor and Francis group. Chapter explores the practice of untouchability through the experience of one Indian village. The chapter recounts the experience of PVCHR, a NGO, in breaking down the barriers that hindered the Dalits from enjoying their most basic rights through the mobilization and empowerment of Dalits to voice their concerns and fight for justice. At the G20 Interfaith Summit 2023 held at the World Peace Dome in Pune, Lenin Raghuvanshi, alongside Shruti, played a pivotal role in discussions addressing global issues such as violent conflicts, inequality, climate crisis, and declining trust in institutions. As speakers in parallel sessions 2A and 3A, they shared insightful perspectives on vulnerability, child protection, interfaith collaboration, and Sustainable Development Goals (SDGs). Their contributions, rooted in grassroots perspectives and best practices, resonated well with session chairs and the audience, emphasizing the transformative potential of interfaith collaboration within the G20 process. This showcased Lenin Raghuvanshi's commitment to tackling global challenges and driving positive change. Raghuvanshi authored Kashi (2026), a work in history and politics that examines Varanasi’s plural religious and cultural traditions alongside contemporary social and economic changes. The book discusses issues such as communalism, commodification of heritage, and structural inequalities, with particular reference to marginalized communities including Dalits, Muslims, widows, sanitation workers, and weavers.
