= Menjor Multipurpose Research Centre and Unity Park =

Research centre and unity park in Manipur, India

- MMRC and Unity Park
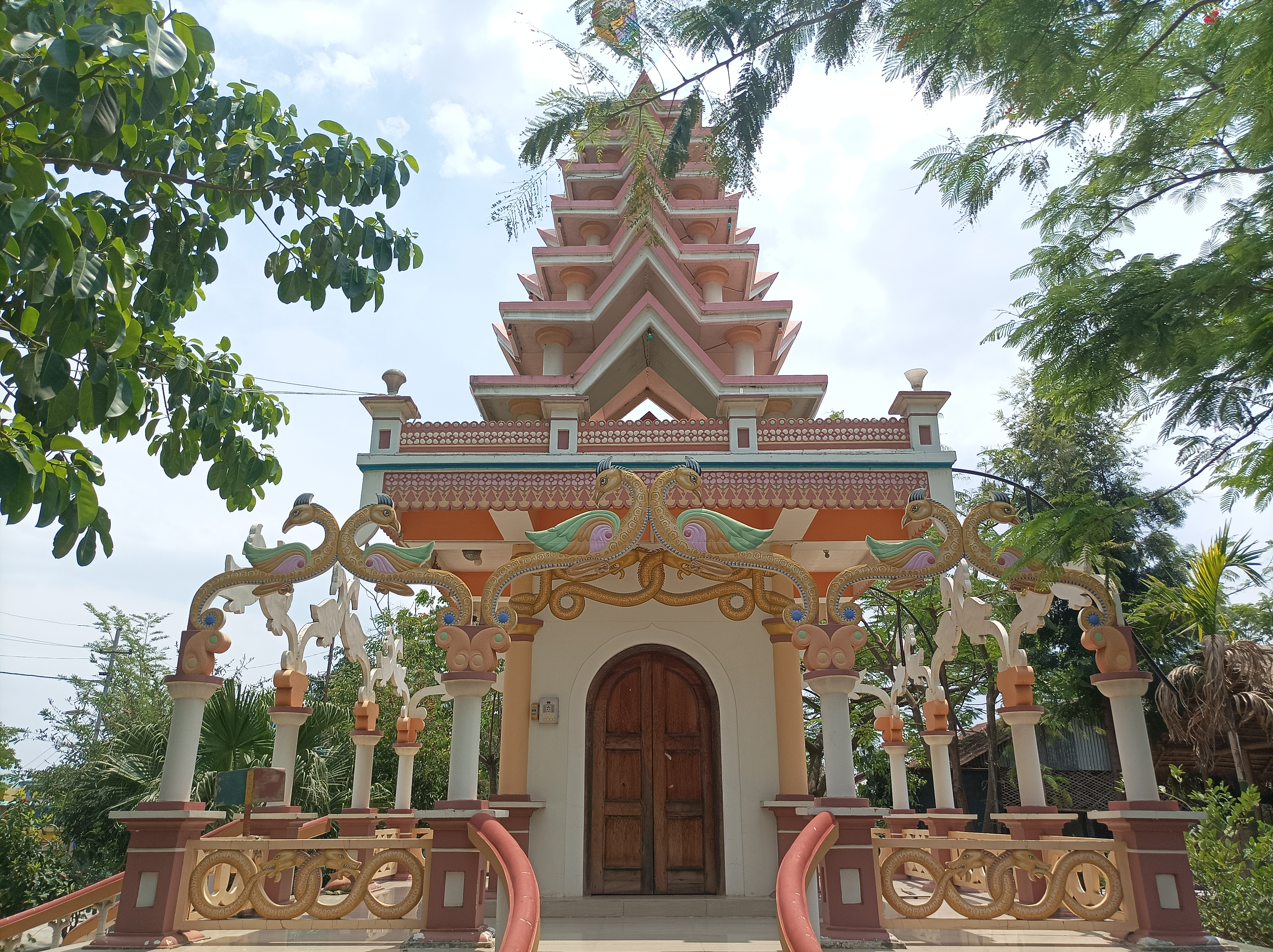
- A shrine of God Pakhangba of traditional Meitei religion (Sanamahism) in the MMRC & Unity Park
- Interactive map of Menjor Multipurpose Research Centre and Unity Park
- Location: Khangabok, Thoubal district, Manipur
- Nearest city: Imphal
- Nearest town: Thoubal
- Founder: Khundrakpam Menjor Mangang
- Owner: Khundrakpam Menjor Mangang
- Administrator: Khundrakpam Menjor Mangang
- Manager: Khundrakpam Menjor Mangang
- Status: active
- Parking: yes

Menjor Multipurpose Research Centre and Unity Park, shortly known as MMRC and Unity Park, is a garden, museum, recreation park and research centre for culture of different ethnic and religious groups of Manipur, with a special focus on the Meitei culture. It is located in Khangabok town in Thoubal district of Manipur. It houses a temple of Pakhangba of traditional Meitei religion (Sanamahism), a Hindu temple, a Buddhist temple, a church and a mosque, promoting communal harmony.

== Features ==
The MMRC and Unity Park was constructed by educationalist Kh. Menjor Mangang. It is a multi-dimensional research centre (MMRC), tourist destination as well as recreation park.

It also displays the traditional lifestyles of the ancient Meiteis. Among the numerous sculptures being showcased, the statues of Lourembam Khongnangthaba along with six other divine maichous are considered to be a rare work of art.
