= Shruti Nagvanshi =

Indian activist

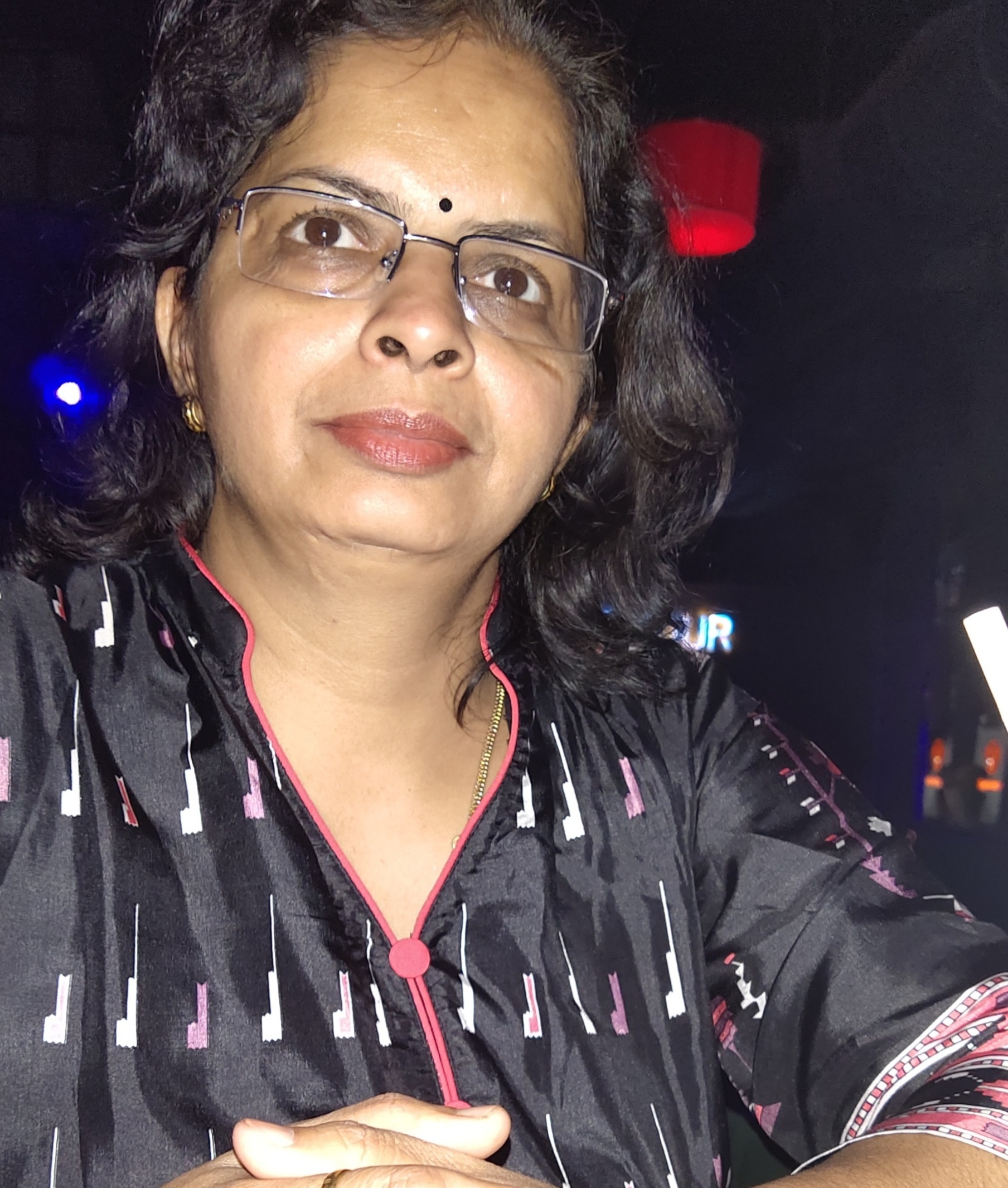
- Born: 2 January 1974 (age 52); Varanasi, India
- Citizenship: Indian
- Education: Bachelor degree in social science, Hindi and Ancient History (1995)
- Alma mater: Udai Pratap Autonomous College, Varanasi
- Occupation: Social activist
- Known for: People's Vigilance Committee on Human Rights (PVCHR)
- Spouse: Lenin Raghuvanshi
- Children: Kabeer Karunik
- Parent(s): Late Lallan Singh (Father); Late Urmila Singh (Mother)
- Awards: Rex Karmveer Chakra (silver), 100 women of India, Jan Mitra Award
- Website: www.pvchr.asia www.pvchr.blogspot.com shrutinagvanshi.com

Shruti Nagvanshi (born 2 January 1974) is an Indian women's and child's rights activist and an advocate for marginalized groups in India, including the untouchable caste known as Dalit and rural women. She is one of the founding members of People's Vigilance Committee on Human Rights (PVCHR) and a founder of Savitri Bai Phule Mahila Panchayat, a women’s forum. She has worked with several other projects to empower minorities.

She founded the People's Vigilance Committee on Human Rights (PVCHR) in 1996, with her husband Lenin Raghuvanshi, historian Mahendra Pratap, musician Vikash Maharaj, and poet Gyanedra Pati. Both she and Lenin are converts to Buddhism. She was nominated for the Nobel Peace Prize for her contributions to bettering conditions for world peace and for acting as a driving force to prevent the use of masculinity-driven militarist traditions as a weapon of war and conflict.

== Personal life ==
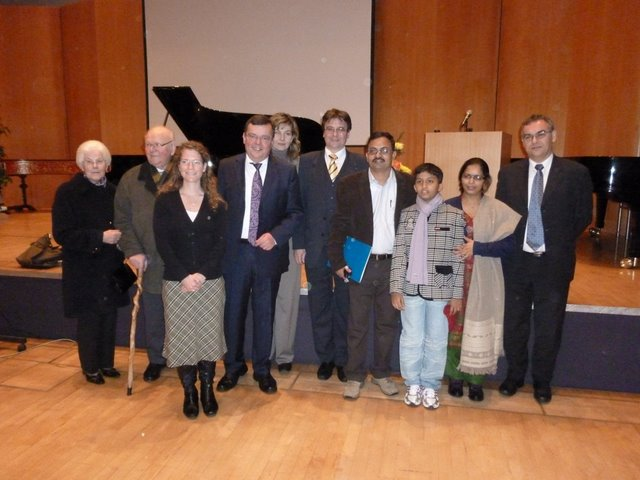
Shruti Nagvanshi, alongside her life partner Lenin Raghuvanshi and their son Kabeer Karunik, at the ceremony for the International Human Rights Prize of the City of Weimar, held in Weimar, Germany, on December 10, 2010

Shruti Nagvanshi was born on 2 January 1974 in the Dashashwmedh area of the Varanasi district in the state of Uttar Pradesh. Inspired by her mother’s encouragement towards a better education, she overcame obstacles and completed her education. She married Dr Lenin Raghuvanshi on 22 February 1992. Their only son, Kabeer Karunik, plays snooker at the national level.

== Initial Years ==
Once Nagvanshi left home to attend college, she realized how lack of opportunity restricts human desire to achieve goals in life. It was this self-belief which gave her the courage to participate in social work, learn, and develop awareness of the world. Her mother remained an inspiration to her to help others grow. She was part of several local social work programmes and later became involved in the Uttar Pradesh chapter of the United Nations Youth Organisation. Marriage in an orthodox hierarchy-conforming family helped her to understand the mind of caste from close proximity. With the formation of JMN/PVCHR she decided to devote herself to her passion and would walk kilometers on foot to reach to the interior villages inhabited by untouchables.

== Anti-caste work ==
She is involved in building relations between various communities through modelling and teaching awareness of individual rights and the rule of law. Her organization PVCHR focuses on reconciliation between the historically marginalized and historically privileged, and represents a secular and right-leaning wing of the larger anti-caste activist movement. Nagvanshi believes the very thought that they can fight against injustice is empowering. This pursuit of empowerment brought structural changes in her adopted villages and intervention areas. Her work has led to increased accessibility to health, education, livelihood and welfare services. Many people from upper castes in India are beginning to embrace an inclusive society.

== On malnutrition and children's right to survival ==
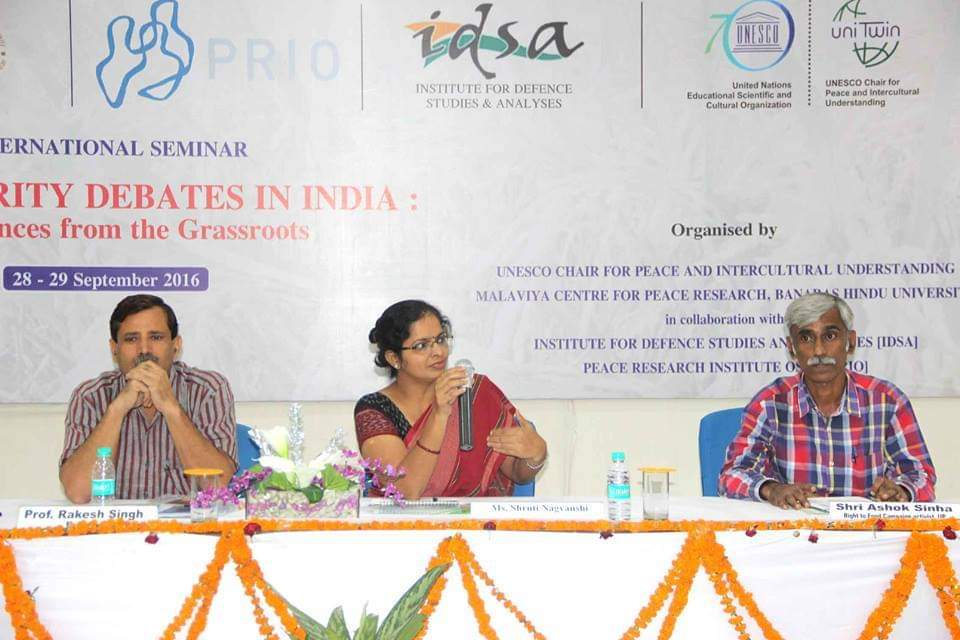
Shruti Nagvanshi shares her insights on the Right to Food at a seminar organized by PRIO, Norway, and the Malviya Centre for Peace Research, BHU, in Varanasi (2016)

In 2017, she and her team at JanMitra Nyas chose 50 villages and some slums in the most marginalised communities in four blocks of the Varanasi district to work on the issue of children’s health with the support of Child Rights and You (CRY). Maternal, neonatal, and malnourished death declined in these communities.

== Recognition ==
Shruti received the Rex Karmveer Chakra (silver) in 2019. Her work has been acknowledged by film actor Aamir Khan and she has been invited to participate in Satyamev Jayate TV series, a TV show hosted by Aamir Khan that discussed issue of rape that went on air in 2014. Indian poet, lyricist and screenwriter Javed Akhtar honored her with the Jan Mitra Award in 2000 at Kabeer Mela (Kabeer festival) to recognize her extraordinary work for communal harmony and promotion of Kabir teaching. She was awarded the Top 100 Women Achievers of India in 2016 by the Union Ministry of Women and Child Development (MWCD) and Facebook jointly in the category of ‘Access to Justice Protecting Women and their rights'.

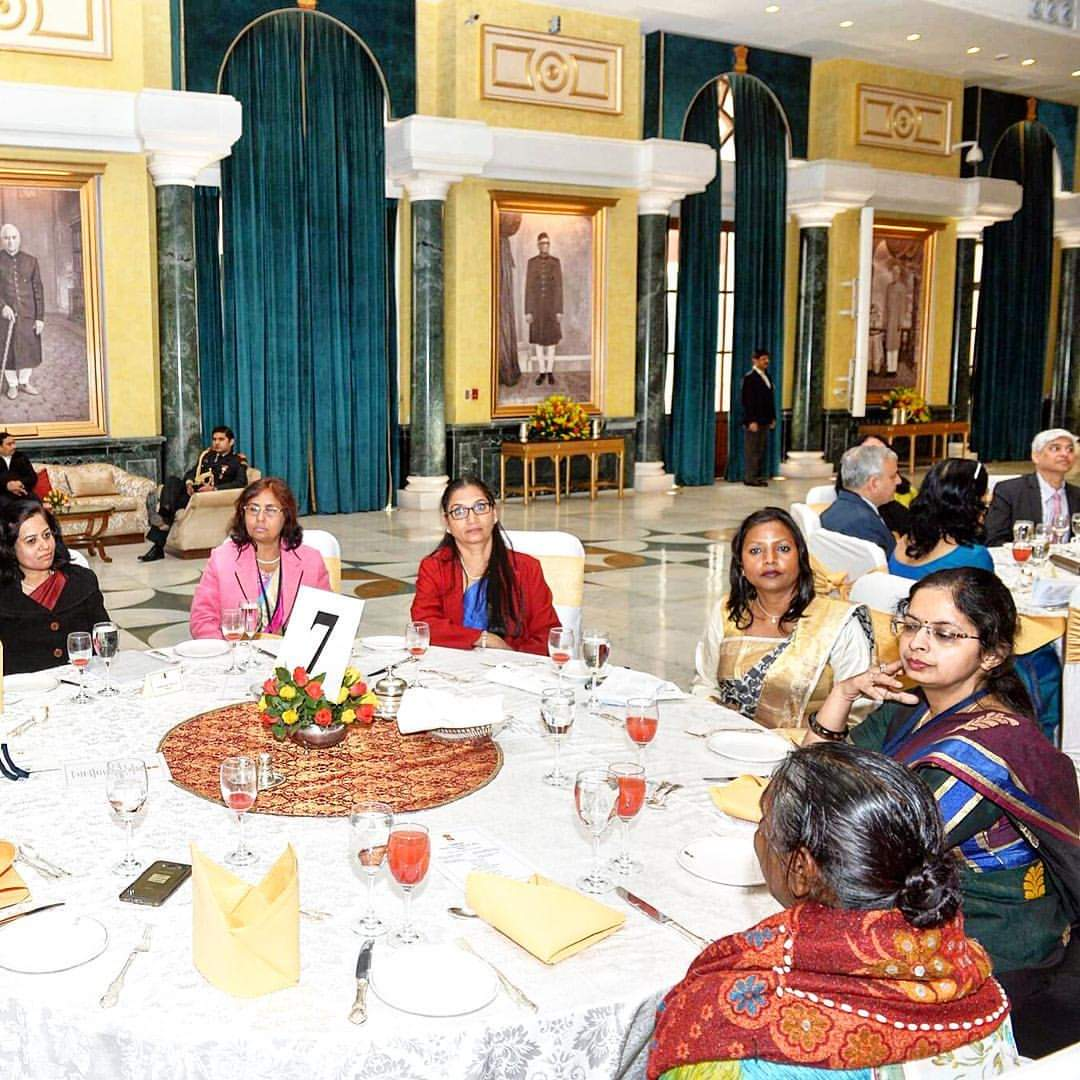
Shruti Nagvanshi attends a celebratory lunch hosted by the President of India after being honored as one of the Top 100 Women Achievers of India in 2016 by MWCD and Facebook for her work in 'Access to Justice: Protecting Women and Their Rights.

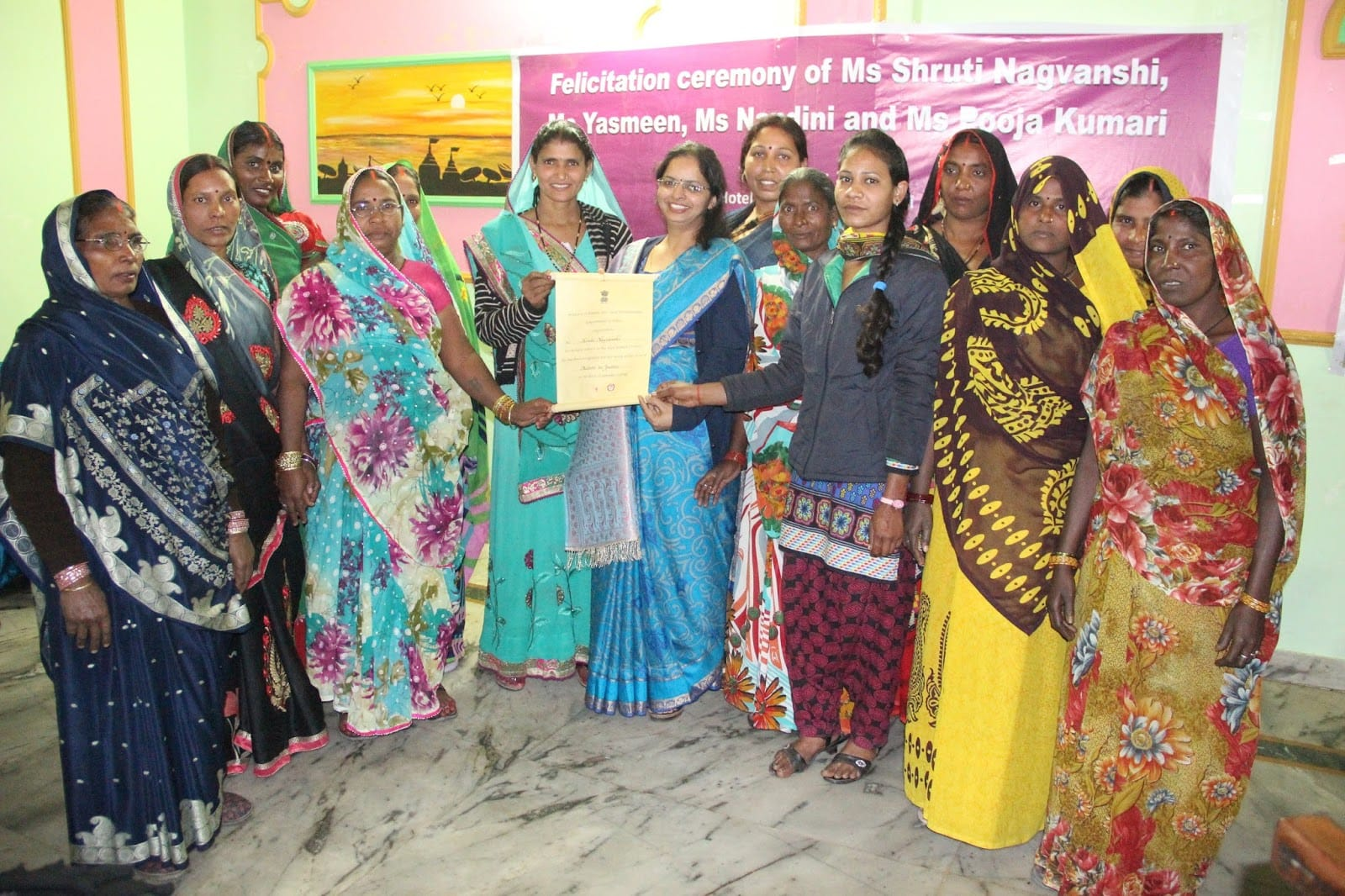
Women of marginalized communities in Varanasi honor Shruti Nagvanshi for being recognized among the Top 100 Women Achievers of India in 2016 by MWCD and Facebook, celebrating her dedication to 'Access to Justice: Protecting Women and Their Rights.

She received the Tilaka Manjhi National award with Lenin Raghuvanshi by the Ang Madad Foundation, an NGO based in Bhagalpur, Bihar for her work on Dalit women's rights. Two Dalit rights activists from Varanasi, Uttar Pradesh, Mrs Shruti Nagvanshi and Mr Lenin Raghuvanshi have been mentioned as “21st Century Heroes of India” from the perspective of Liberty, Equality, Fraternity and other Indian Constitutional Values by Pippa Rann Books & Media, based in the United Kingdom. Shruti received Public Peace prize 2020-21 for extraordinary work for child rights and women rights. Nagvanshi has been awarded the following national and international honours since 2021:

- 2021: On 15 August 2021, India Times Hindi edition listed Nagvanshi as one of the 11 Human Rights Activists in India whose Life Mission is to provide others With A Dignified Life.
- 2022: Savitri Bai Phule Nation award for women empowerment and resilience by Savitri Bai Phule Foundation with hand of an eminent author Sharankumar Limbale
- 2022: Personality of week by Bahujan Samvad
- 2023: One of selected magnificent Women Leaders to look upto in 2023
- 2024: Recipient of the 2024 Great Companies International Women Entrepreneur Award, leads JanMitra Nyas, a pioneering NGO in Varanasi, India, dedicated to realizing Sustainable Development Goals at the grassroots level. Since 1999, JanMitra Nyas has notably improved children's health in marginalized communities. Nagvashi's work and JanMitra Nyas have been featured in the Women Story titled "JanMitra Nyas: Pioneering Health Equity at the Grassroots.".
- 2024: Shruti Nagvanshi's tireless activism for human rights and social justice in Uttar Pradesh earned her recognition at the 68th Commission on the Status of Women at the UN Headquarters. Her pivotal role underscores the vital contribution of grassroots activists like Nagvanshi in advancing gender equality globally, as highlighted in the UN Women India and Ford Foundation's collaborative effort, "Hum: When Women Lead." This coffee table book features an anthology of 75 stories on Indian women's transformative leadership, documented by an all-women team, showcasing the resilience and impact of leaders like Nagvanshi across diverse sectors.
- 2024: Karmaveer Gold Chakra Award for her tireless advocacy for the rights of marginalized Dalit and Adivasi women.
- 2025: Honored globally for championing human dignity, she received the 2025 Business Titans Award for Excellence in Promoting Human Dignity and Social Leadership.
- 2025: Journalist Vijay Vineet recognized Shruti Nagvanshi for her unwavering commitment to grassroots activism, describing her as a compassionate force who has given the human rights movement a humane and resilient character.
- 2025:According to ETV Bharat, Shruti Nagvanshi has led a decades-long struggle against child marriage, caste- and gender-based oppression, and social injustice in Varanasi and surrounding regions, emerging as a prominent grassroots human rights activist.
- 2026:Recognized for her nearly three decades of work against child labor, child marriage, and violence toward marginalized women and girls, Shruti Nagvanshi’s story has been featured by Her Circle, a women-focused digital platform founded by Nita Ambani.
- 2026:Recognized at the TOI National CSR Summit 2026 and honoured at Amar Ujala’s Aparajita ceremony for her work in social justice and women’s empowerment.

== Literary and academic contribution ==
Shruti frequently contributes articles to newsletters and online websites. Her latest book with academic Dr. Archana Kaushik is Margins to Centre Stage: Empowering Dalits in India. At the G20 Interfaith Summit 2023, Shruti Nagvanshi played a pivotal role alongside Lenin, contributing insights on vulnerability, child protection, interfaith collaboration, and Sustainable Development Goals (SDGs) during parallel sessions 2A and 3A. Organized by the G20 Interfaith Forum in collaboration with MIT-World Peace University and the Interfaith Alliance for Safer Communities, the summit at the World Peace Dome in Pune addressed urgent global issues, emphasizing concrete actions within the G20 process. Shruti's grassroots perspectives and best practices underscored her dedication to positive change on the international stage. Nagvanshi co-authored Kashi (2026), a work in history and politics that explores the social and cultural landscape of Varanasi through the lens of inclusion and exclusion. The book focuses on the experiences of marginalized groups—particularly Dalits, women, widows, and informal workers—while examining the impact of socio-economic change and the transformation of religious heritage in the city.
