= Malom Massacre =

2000 massacre of civilians in Manipur, India

- Location: Malom, Manipur, India
- Date: 2 November 2000; 25 years ago 3:20 p.m. (IST)
- Target: Civilians
- Attack type: Massacre
- Deaths: 10
- Perpetrator: Assam Rifles

The Malom Massacre took place on 2 November 2000 at Malom, near Imphal, in the Indian state of Manipur, when armed personnel of the Assam Rifles opened fire near a bus stop, resulting in the death of ten civilians on the spot.

The incident occurred in the aftermath of a bomb attack on a convoy of the paramilitary force and became a significant event in discussions on extrajudicial killings and the Armed Forces (Special Powers) Act, 1958 (AFSPA).

== Background ==
At the time of the incident, the Armed Forces (Special Powers) Act, 1958 was in force in the state. The Act grants special powers to the armed forces operating in areas declared as "disturbed".

== Incident ==
On 2 November 2000, armed personnel of the Assam Rifles opened fire at civilians waiting at a bus stop in Malom near Imphal. Ten civilians were killed on the spot.

The victims included 17-year-old Sinam Chandramani, a 1988 National Bravery Award winner.

== Aftermath ==
The incident drew widespread condemnation from civil society groups and the public in Manipur. Curfew was imposed in parts of Imphal following the killings.

The massacre became a turning point in the region's human rights movement. It prompted activist Irom Sharmila Chanu to begin a prolonged hunger strike demanding the repeal of AFSPA. On 5 November, Sharmila began her hunger strike after she sat under a shelter near the site of the killings with a placard, announcing she will fast until the act was repealed. Sharmila's strike ended on 9 August 2016, making it the world's longest hunger strike.

Over the years, legal proceedings and public interest litigations were filed seeking accountability. In 2014, the Manipur High Court directed the payment of ₹5 lakh compensation for each of the families of 10 victims.

== Legacy ==
Annual memorials are held at Malom to commemorate the victims.

== See also ==
- Insurgency in Northeast India
