= Games24x7 =

Indian online gaming company

- Type: Private
- Industry: Online gaming, Technology
- Founded: 2006
- Founder: Bhavin Pandya; Trivikraman Thampy
- Headquarters: Mumbai, India
- Area served: India
- Parent: Play Games24x7
- Website: Official website

Games24x7 is an Indian online gaming company founded in 2006, and headquartered in Mumbai, India. The company is known for its games like RummyCircle and My11Circle. It has offices in Mumbai, Bengaluru, New Delhi, and Miami. As of 2022, the company was valued at $2.5 billion following a $75 million fundraising round. It is backed by investors such as Tiger Global Management, The Raine Group, and Malabar Investment Advisors. The company also operates a venture arm, Games24x7 Ventures, and a philanthropic wing, Games24x7 Foundation.

== History ==
Games24x7 was founded by Bhavin Pandya and Trivikraman Thampy, who met while studying economics at New York University (NYU) and shared a passion for online games. In 2006, Pandya returned to India and started Games24x7 with Thampy. They began with rummy, chess, and a bunch of other games online, which quickly became popular and were offered for free. The company partnered with HDFC to establish a payment gateway for online real-money gaming. They also advocated for the industry's legitimacy to Google and Facebook, enabling the sector to advertise on these platforms. In 2009, the company launched RummyCircle, an online real money gaming platform for playing the traditional Indian card game rummy. It quickly gained popularity within the gaming community and attracted a considerable user base. Games24x7 started investing in free-to-play games. It launched Ultimate Teen Patti and Ultimate Rummy. In December 2015, Ultimate Teen Patti became the highest-grossing Teen Patti app on the Google Play store. In 2019, the founders rolled out My11Circle, a fantasy sports vertical, and roped in Sourav Ganguly as the brand ambassador. The platform gained traction and became one of the top fantasy cricket brands, especially during the Indian Premier League (IPL) in 2021. It later expanded to fantasy football, and Kabaddi on My11Circle.

In 2022, the company became a unicorn after raising $75 million, reaching a valuation of $2.5 billion. Tiger Global was the first institutional investor for Games24x7 in 2011.

=== TechXpedite ===
In 2023, Games24x7 launched GameTech Accelerate, later rebranded as TechXpedite, a 60-day accelerator programme targeting early-stage startups in the domains of gaming, artificial intelligence, and inclusive technology. In its 2024–25 edition, the programme selected 17 startups from over 330 applications, providing mentorship, resources, and up to US$500,000 in technology credits from more than 30 partner companies. It concluded with a pitch event in March 2025. TechXpedite has been associated with support from state-level stakeholders such as the governments of Karnataka, Telangana, and Maharashtra, along with the Department for Promotion of Industry and Internal Trade (DPIIT).

== Collaborations and sponsorships ==
=== My11Circle ===
In 2021, My11Circle named Indian international cricketer and right-arm bowler Mohammed Siraj its brand ambassador. Among My11Circle's other brand ambassadors were Saurav Ganguly, Ajinkya Rahane, VVS Laxman, and Ranveer Singh. In March 2022, Shubman Gill and Ruturaj Gaikwad became new brand ambassadors. My11Circle also secured the title sponsorship for both Lucknow Super Giants, an IPL team, and the Women's T20 Challenge, granted by the Board of Control for Cricket in India (BCCI) in May 2022. In 2024, My11Circle was appointed as the new official Fantasy Sports Partner for the Indian Premier League (IPL) 2024 season. In March, Games24x7 onboarded Rinku Singh and Yashasvi Jaiswal as new brand ambassadors for My11Circle.

In April 2025, the company launched the 'Circle Mein Aaja' campaign during the Tata IPL, featuring brand ambassadors Sourav Ganguly, Shubman Gill, Arshdeep Singh, Ruturaj Gaikwad, and Mohammed Siraj. The campaign included a remake of a 1990s track composed by Anu Malik to encourage fan participation.

=== RummyCircle ===
In 2022, Bollywood actor Hrithik Roshan became the brand ambassador for RummyCircle. In 2024, the company launched the Khelo Befikar, Jeeto RummyCircle Par campaign, featuring Hrithik.

In 2025, RummyCircle launched the National Rummy Series, a nationwide rummy tournament, supported by an advertising campaign featuring Sourav Ganguly. The five-part finale streamed exclusively on JioCinema and Disney+ Hotstar.

== Associations ==
In 2017, Games24x7 and other gaming companies collaborated to establish E-Gaming Federation (formally The Online Rummy Federation), a body that self-regulates the online rummy industry.

Games24x7 is a part of various industry associations, including FICCI's gaming committee, Assocham, IAMAI, and the Bombay Chamber of Commerce.

=== Corporate Social Responsibility ===
In 2022, Nobel peace laureate Kailash Satyarthi launched Bal Mitra Mandal (BMM) in Pune, supported by Games24x7, to create a slum community and empower children and their communities to secure their rights, protect against child labor and abuse, and raise awareness on education, water, sanitation, and hygiene.

Games24x7, in collaboration with the Kailash Satyarthi Children's Foundation (KSCF), recently published a report highlighting a concerning rise in child trafficking cases in Delhi since the onset of the COVID-19 pandemic. The report shows a substantial 68% increase in trafficked children in Delhi, and Uttar Pradesh witnessed an alarming nearly six-fold rise. The national capital has emerged as a major hub for trafficked children, with more than one-fourth of rescued children originating from Delhi. The sectors with the highest prevalence of child labor include hotels and dhabas (15.6%), family-owned automobile or transport units (13%), and garments (11.18%).

In December 2023, the company formed a partnership with the Karnataka Government to launch an online gaming accelerator initiative called GameTech Accelerate.

Games24x7 Foundation, the not-for-profit arm of Games24x7, was established in 2022. In January 2024, the foundation launched the Wheels of Change initiative on National Girl Child Day. As part of this initiative, the foundation distributed 1,000 bicycles in the Dharashiv district, specifically in Bhoom, Washim, and Paranda to help address transportation challenges for girl students accessing higher education in remote areas of Maharashtra. In April 2024, the foundation announced its collaboration with NGOs and sports academies in six Indian cities to provide youth and athletes from underserved backgrounds the opportunity to attend a TATA IPL T20 match.

== Controversies ==
=== Regulatory Impact and Layoffs ===
In September 2025, media reports stated that Games24X7 initiated a large-scale workforce reduction, with estimates suggesting that up to 70% of its employees, approximately 500 staff, were affected. The reported layoffs followed a government decision to prohibit money-based online gaming formats, which significantly impacted the company’s core business operations.

== Awards and recognition ==
- Start-Up Awards by Entrepreneur India
- LinkedIn Top Companies 2023
- Aegis Graham Bell Awards 2023
