= Child Rights and You =

Child rights organisation in India

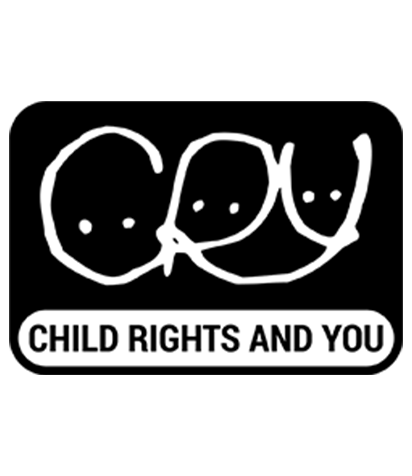
- Abbreviation: CRY
- Founded: 1979
- Founder: Rippan Kapur
- Type: Non-governmental organization
- Purpose: Children's rights
- Locations: Home office: Mumbai, India; Branches: Mumbai, Bangalore, Chennai, Delhi, Kolkata
- Website: www.cry.org

Child Rights and You (CRY) is an Indian non-governmental organization (NGO) that works to promote children's rights.

The organization was started in 1979 by Rippan Kapur, an Air India purser. CRY works with 102 local NGOs across 19 states in India and has impacted the lives of over 4.7 million children.

CRY works on children's issues by working with parents, teachers, Anganwadi (Indian rural child care center) workers, communities, district and state-level governments, as well as the children. The organization focuses on grassroots level and public policy advocacy related to children's rights.

CRY works on 4 key areas:

- Education (Right To Development)
- Health & Nutrition (Right To Survival)
- Safety & Protection (Right To Protection)
- Child Participation (Right To Participation)

== History ==
Established in 1979 as Child Relief and You, CRY was started by Rippan Kapur with aim of supporting children's welfare in India. Kapur developed the organisation to support local NGOs with funding and technical assistance. Kapur died in 1994.

CRY has developed from a welfare-relief organisation into one that advocates for children's rights. It has worked to ensure that the diversity in ethnicity, religion, and caste among its staff does not affect its operation.

CRY participated in the 'Voice Of India' campaign as a part of the National Alliance for the Fundamental Right to Education (NAFRE), to propose a constitutional amendment for free and compulsory education to all children. This contributed to the Right of Children to Free and Compulsory Education Act, 2009 (RTE).

CRY focuses on changing the habits and behaviors at the grassroots level and indirectly influencing citizens at a systemic level so that children are made the top priority.

CRY is involved with several international forums on children's rights, including Girls Not Brides and the National Action and Coordination Group For Ending Violence Against Children (NACG-EVAC).

== Impact ==
In 2025–26, CRY has impacted more than 21,14,322 underprivileged children in India.

- 91% children in CRY project areas, between the ages of 6–18 years, in school.
- 96% children in CRY project areas, under the age of 5 years, protected from undernourishment
- 88% of adolescent girls, in CRY project areas, between 11–18 years, protected from child marriage
- 90% children, in CRY project areas, between the ages of 6–18 years, protected from child labour

== Campaigns ==
CRY has launched the following campaigns:

- #YellowFellow, which raises awareness for the right to a happy childhood. Launched in 2018, the campaign encourages people to show support for India's children by posting photos while wearing yellow socks in a creative way. The campaign has reached 1.7 crore (17 million) people across India.
- #LearnNotEarn, which was held on World Day Against Child Labour (12 June) in 2018 and 2019, helped raise awareness on the issue of child labour in India, and encouraged citizens to ensure that children are able to go to school instead of work. Child labour is an important area of focus for the charity.
- #ItsAGirlThing, which was released on National Girl Child Day (24 January) 2019 and aimed to break the stereotypes associated with girls.
- #NotYet, which was held on International Women's Day (8 March) 2020 and raised awareness of child marriage issues.
- #PooriPadhaiDeshKiBhalai, which was held in April 2021, was a national campaign to raise awareness on the economic and social importance of girls completing their secondary education.
- #Body Shop India Partners With CRY, a 2021 campaign sponsored by the beauty products brand to raise awareness of menstruation, menstruation shaming, and its impact on girls and women, along with menstrual health and education efforts.

CRY has also campaigned for increased government investment in child protection and education. It has highlighted child malnutrition and access to health care. In 2021 the organisation drew attention to children's mental health and to the trauma children have experienced during the COVID-19 pandemic in India.

== Publications ==
CRY has commissioned four books about direct work with children. In July 2020, CRY launched the handbook Bal Sanrakshan Samiti in Mumbai to address severe issues of child protection in rural and urban areas. This handbook is step-by-step guide on how child protection committees should function at the village and ward level.

== See also ==
- Odisha State Child Protection Society
- Gopali Youth Welfare Society
