= Armed Forces (Special Powers) Act, 1958 =

1958 act of the Parliament of India

Parliament of India
- Long title: An Act to enable certain special powers to be conferred upon members of the armed forces in disturbed areas in the States of Arunachal Pradesh, Assam, Manipur, Meghalaya, Mizoram, Nagaland and Tripura.
- Citation: Act No. 28 of 1958
- Enacted by: Parliament of India
- Enacted: 11 September 1958
- Commenced: 11 September 1958
- Status: In force

The Armed Forces (Special Powers) Act, 1958 (AFSPA) is an act of the Parliament of India that grants special powers to the Indian Armed Forces to maintain public order in "disturbed areas". According to the Disturbed Areas (Special Courts) Act, 1976 once declared 'disturbed', the area has to maintain status quo for a minimum of 3 months. One such act passed on 11 September 1958 was applicable to the Naga Hills, then part of Assam. In the following decades it spread, one by one, to the other Seven Sister States in India's northeast (at present, it is in force in the States of Assam, Nagaland, Manipur {excluding Imphal Municipal Council Area}, Changlang, Longding and Tirap districts of Arunachal Pradesh, and areas falling within the jurisdiction of the eight police stations of districts in Arunachal Pradesh bordering the State of Assam). Another act passed in 1983, applicable to Punjab and Chandigarh, was withdrawn in 1997, roughly 14 years after it came to force. An act passed in 1990 was applied to Jammu and Kashmir and has been in force ever since.

The acts have received criticism from several sections for alleged human rights violations in the regions of its enforcement. National politicians like P. Chidambaram and Saifuddin Soz of Congress have advocated revocation of AFSPA, while some like Amarinder Singh are against its revocation.

Since 2022, forces in the northeast have seen significant scaledown of deployments. For the first time since 1954, no army unit of the size of brigade is being employed for the purpose of counter insurgency in the northeast. Now, the Assam Rifles looks after the same role, though some of the residual army units are moved to the border areas.

== History ==
The Armed Forces Special Powers Ordinance of 1942 was promulgated by the British colonial government on 15 August 1942 to suppress the Quit India Movement. Modeled on these lines, four ordinances—the Bengal Disturbed Areas (Special Powers of Armed Forces) Ordinance; the Assam Disturbed Areas (Special Powers of Armed Forces) Ordinance; the East Bengal Disturbed Areas (Special Powers of Armed Forces) Ordinance; the United provinces Disturbed Areas (Special Powers of Armed Forces) Ordinance were invoked by the Indian government to deal with the internal security situation in the country in 1947 which emerged due to the Partition of India. Article 355 of the Constitution of India confers power to the Central Government to protect every state from internal disturbance.

=== Armed Forces Special Powers (Assam and Manipur) Act, 1958 ===
In 1951, the Naga National Council Nation'. There was a boycott of the first general election of 1952 which later extended to a boycott of government schools and officials. In order to deal with the situation, the Assam government imposed the Assam Maintenance of Public Order (Autonomous District) Act in the Naga Hills in 1953 and intensified police action against the rebels. When the situation worsened, Assam deployed the Assam Rifles in the Naga Hills and enacted the Assam Disturbed Areas Act of 1955, providing a legal framework for the paramilitary forces and the armed state police to combat insurgency in the region. But the Assam Rifles and the state armed police could not contain the Naga rebellion and the rebel Naga Nationalist Council (NNC) formed a parallel government "The Federal Government of Nagaland" on 23 March 1956. The Armed Forces (Assam and Manipur) Special Powers Ordinance 1958 was promulgated by the President Dr. Rajendra Prasad on 22 May 1958. It was replaced by the Armed Forces (Assam and Manipur) Special Powers Act, 1958 on 11 September 1958.

The Armed Forces (Assam and Manipur) Special Powers Act, 1958 empowered only the Governors of the States and the Administrators of the Union Territories to declare areas in the concerned State or the Union Territory as 'disturbed'. The reason for conferring such a power as per "Objects and Reasons'" appended to the Bill was that "Keeping in view the duty of the Union under Article 355 of the Constitution, interalia, to protect every State against internal disturbance, it is considered desirable that the Central government should also have power to declare areas as 'disturbed', to enable its armed forces to exercise the special powers". The territorial scope of the act also expanded to the seven states of the North-East - Assam, Manipur, Meghalaya, Nagaland, Tripura, Arunachal Pradesh and Mizoram. In addition, the words "The Armed Forces (Assam and Manipur) Special Powers Act, 1958" were substituted by "Armed Forces (Special Powers) Act, 1958", getting the acronym of AFSPA, 1958.

Recently the Tripura state government has decided to withdraw the controversial act, citing significant reduction in the extent of terrorist activities in the state. In June 2015, after review, the AFSPA in Nagaland state was extended by one more year.

In November 2016, Government of India has extended AFSPA in three districts of Arunachal Pradesh- Tirap, Changlang and Longding. The period has further been extended by another 6 months in above three districts of Arunachal Pradesh in April, 2018. These have been declared as "disturbed area" under Section 3 of the AFSPA. In these districts, Naga underground factions including National Socialist Council of Nagaland (Isak-Muivah) and NSCN (Khaplang) are involved in extortion, recruitment of locals, and rivalry.

=== The Armed Forces (Punjab and Chandigarh) Special Powers Act, 1983 ===
The central government enacted the Armed Forces (Punjab and Chandigarh) Special Powers Act on 6 October 1983, repealing the Armed Forces (Punjab and Chandigarh) Special Powers Ordinance, 1983 to enable the central armed forces to operate in the state of Punjab and the union territory of Chandigarh. The act was enforced in the whole of Punjab and Chandigarh on 15 October 1983. The terms of the act broadly remained the same as that of the Armed Forces Special Powers Act (Assam and Manipur) of 1972 except for two sections, which provided additional powers to the armed forces.

1. Sub-section (e) was added to Section 4 stipulating that any vehicle can be stopped, searched and seized forcibly if it is suspected of carrying proclaimed offenders or ammunition.
2. Section 5 was added to the act specifying that a soldier has the power to break open any locks "if the key thereof is withheld".

The act was withdrawn in 1997, roughly 14 years after it came to force. However the Disturbed areas act was in force until 2012 in Chandigarh until the High Court struck it down.

=== The Armed Forces (Jammu and Kashmir) Special Powers Act, 1990 ===
The Armed Forces (Jammu and Kashmir) Special Powers Act, 1990 was enacted in September, 1990.

If the governor of Jammu and Kashmir or the Central Government, is of opinion that the whole or any part of the union territory is in such a disturbed and dangerous condition then this act can be imposed.

== The act ==
The Articles in the Constitution of India empower state governments to declare a state of emergency due to one or more of the following reasons:

- Failure of the administration and the local police to tackle local issues
- Return of (central) security forces leads to return of miscreants/erosion of the "peace dividend"
- The scale of unrest or instability in the state is too large for local forces to handle

In such cases, it is the prerogative of the state government to call for central help. In most cases, for example during elections, when the local police may be stretched too thin to simultaneously handle day-to-day tasks, the central government obliges by sending in the BSF and the CRPF. Such cases do not come under the purview of AFSPA. AFSPA is confined to be enacted only when a state, or part of it, is declared a 'disturbed area'. Continued unrest, like in the cases of militancy and insurgency, and especially when borders are threatened, are situations where AFSPA is resorted to.

By Act 7 of 1972, the power to declare areas as being disturbed was extended to the central government.

In a civilian setting, soldiers have no legal tender, and are still bound to the same command chain as they would be in a war theater. Neither the soldiers nor their superiors have any training in civilian law or policing procedures. This is where and why the AFSPA comes to bear - to legitimize the presence and acts of armed forces in emergency situations which have been deemed warlike.

According to the Armed Forces Special Powers Act (AFSPA), in an area that is proclaimed as "disturbed", an officer of the armed forces has powers to:

- After giving such due warning, Fire upon or use other kinds of force even if it causes death, against the person who is acting against law or order in the disturbed area for the maintenance of public order,
- Destroy any arms dump, hide-outs, prepared or fortified position or shelter or training camp from which armed attacks are made by the armed volunteers or armed gangs or absconders wanted for any offence.
- To arrest without a warrant anyone who has committed cognizable offences or is reasonably suspected of having done so and may use force if needed for the arrest.
- To enter and search any premise in order to make such arrests, or to recover any person wrongfully restrained or any arms, ammunition or explosive substances and seize it.
- Stop and search any vehicle or vessel reasonably suspected to be carrying such person or weapons.
- Any person arrested and taken into custody under this act shall be made present over to the officer in charge of the nearest police station with least possible delay, together with a report of the circumstances occasioning the arrest.
- Army officers have legal immunity for their actions. There can be no prosecution, suit or any other legal proceeding against anyone acting under that law. Nor is the government's judgment on why an area is found to be disturbed subject to judicial review.
- Protection of persons acting in good faith under this act from prosecution, suit or other legal proceedings, except with the sanction of the Central Government, in exercise of the powers conferred by this act.

On 8 July 2016, in a landmark ruling, the Supreme Court of India ended the immunity of the armed forces from prosecution under AFSPA, saying, in an 85-page judgement, "It does not matter whether the victim was a common person or a militant or a terrorist, nor does it matter whether the aggressor was a common person or the state. The law is the same for both and is equally applicable to both ... This is the requirement of a democracy and the requirement of preservation of the rule of law and the preservation of individual liberties."

== Areas where it is currently applicable ==
AFSPA now applicable fully only in 31 districts of 4 Northeast states and partially in 12 districts.

=== Jammu and Kashmir ===
The Act is applicable in the entire union territory of Jammu and Kashmir.

=== Nagaland ===
- Chümoukedima District
- Dimapur District
- Kiphire District
- Mon District
- Niuland District
- Noklak District
- Peren District
- Phek District
- Areas falling within the jurisdiction of Yanglok Police Station in Longleng
- Zünheboto District (within the jurisdiction of police stations)
    - Aghunato Police Station
    - Ghatashi Police Station
    - Pughoboto Police Station
    - Satakha Police Station
    - Suruhuto Police Station
    - Zunheboto Police Station
- Kohima District (within the jurisdiction of police stations)
    - Khuzama Police Station
    - Kohima North Police Station
    - Kohima South Police Station
    - Zubza Police Station
    - Kezocha Police Station
- Mokokchung District (within the jurisdiction of police stations)
    - Mangkolemba Police Station
    - Mokokchung-I Police Station
    - Longtho Police Station
    - Tuli Police Station
    - Longchem Police Station
    - Anaki 'C' Police Station
- Wokha District (within the jurisdiction of police stations)
    - Bhandari Police Station
    - Champang Police Station
    - Ralan Police Station
    - Süngro Police Station

was extended in nagaland for 6 more months in December (2021)

=== Assam ===
- Tinsukia
- Charaideo
- Sivasagar

=== Arunachal Pradesh ===
- Tirap
- Changlang
- Longding
- Namsai (within the jurisdiction of police stations)
  - Namsai
  - Mahadevpur

=== Manipur ===
- Imphal East, excluding Porompat, Heingang, Lamlai Irilbung police station jurisdiction
- Imphal West, excluding Imphal, Lamphel, City, Singjamei, Sekmai, Lamsang, Patsoi police station jurisdiction
- Bishnupur (excluding one police station jurisdiction)
- Thoubal (excluding one police station jurisdiction)
- Jiribam (excluding one police station jurisdiction)
- Kakching (excluding one police station jurisdiction)
- Senapati
- Ukhrul
- Chandel
- Churachandpur
- Tamenglong
- Kangpokpi (Sadar Hills)
- Tengnoupal
- Kamjong
- Noney
- Pherzawl

== Non-state views and commentary ==
=== United Nations views ===
When India presented its second periodic report to the United Nations Human Rights Committee in 1991, members of the UNHRC asked numerous questions about the validity of the AFSPA. They questioned the constitutionality of the AFSPA under Indian law and asked how it could be justified in light of Article 4 of the International Covenant on Civil and Political Rights, ICCPR. On 23 March 2009, UN Commissioner for Human Rights Navanethem Pillay asked India to repeal the AFSPA. She termed the law as "dated and colonial-era law that breach contemporary international human rights standards."

On 31 March 2012, the UN asked India to revoke AFSPA saying it had no place in Indian democracy. Christof Heyns, UN's Special Rapporteur on extrajudicial, summary or arbitrary executions said "During my visit to Kashmir, AFSPA was described to me as 'hated' and 'draconian'. It clearly violates International Law. A number of UN treaty bodies have pronounced it to be in violation of International Law as well."

=== Non-governmental organizations' analysis ===
The act has been criticized by Human Rights Watch as a "tool of state abuse, oppression and discrimination".

The South Asian Human Rights Documentation Centre argues that the governments' call for increased force is part of the problem.

This reasoning exemplifies the vicious cycle which has been instituted in the North East due to the AFSPA. The use of the AFSPA pushes the demand for more autonomy, giving the people of the North East more reason to want to secede from a state which enacts such powers and the agitation which ensues continues to justify the use of the AFSPA from the point of view of the Indian Government.
— South Asian Human Rights Documentation Centre

A report by the Institute for Defense Studies and Analysis points to multiple occurrences of violence by security forces against civilians in Manipur since the passage of the act. The report states that residents believe that the provision for immunity of security forces urge them to act more brutally. The article, however, goes on to say that repeal or withering away of the act will encourage insurgency. Irom Chanu Sharmila also known as the "Iron Lady of Manipur" or "Mengoubi" ("the fair one") is a civil rights activist, political activist, and poet from the Indian state of Manipur. On 2 November 2000, she began a hunger strike which ended on 9 August 2016 after 16 years. On 2 November 2000, in Malom, a town in the Imphal Valley of Manipur, ten civilians were shot and killed while waiting at a bus stop. The incident, known as the "Malom Massacre", was allegedly committed by the Assam Rifles, one of the Indian Paramilitary forces operating in the state.

In addition to this, there have been claims of disappearances by the police or the army in Kashmir by several human rights organizations.

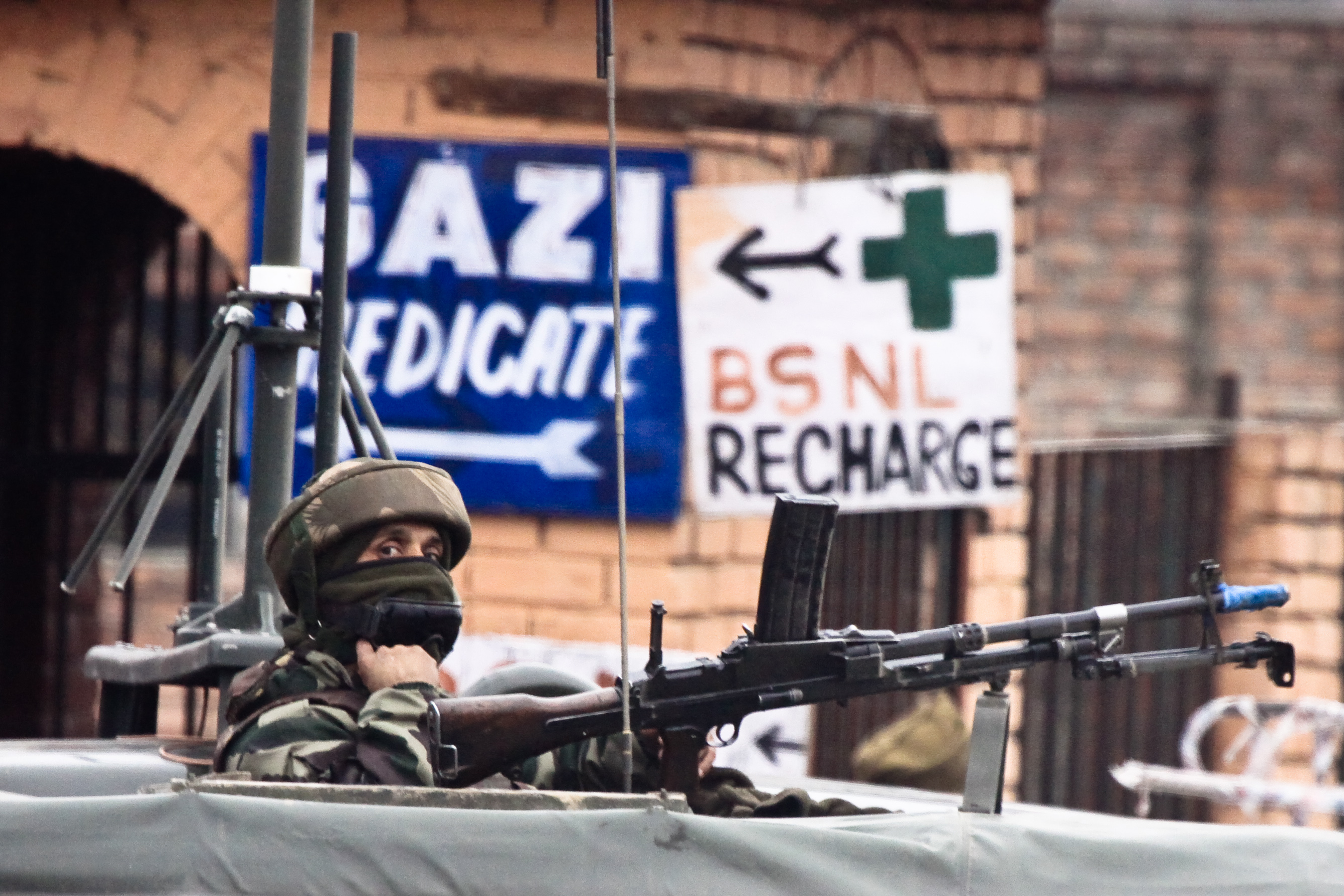
A soldier guards the roadside checkpoint outside Srinagar International Airport in January 2009.

Many human rights organizations such as Amnesty International and the Human Rights Watch (HRW) have condemned human rights abuses in Kashmir by police such as "extra-judicial executions", "disappearances", and torture; the "Armed Forces Special Powers Act", which "provides impunity for human rights abuses and fuels cycles of violence. The Armed Forces Special Powers Act (AFSPA) grants the military wide powers of arrest, the right to shoot to kill, and to occupy or destroy property in counterinsurgency operations. Indian officials claim that troops need such powers because the army is only deployed when national security is at serious risk from armed combatants. Such circumstances, they say, call for extraordinary measures." Human rights organizations have also asked Indian government to repeal the Public Safety Act, since "a detainee may be held in administrative detention for a maximum of two years without a court order."

Activists who are working in J&K for peace and human rights include names of Ashima Kaul, Ram Jethmalani, Faisal Khan, Ravi Nitesh (founder of Mission Bhartiyam), Swami Agnivesh, Dr. Sandeep Pandey and many others. They all accept that people to people communication and development of new avenues are the only way for peace, however laws like AFSPA are continuously violating human rights issues there." What [the Indian State] has failed to see is that such small, ethnic groups are resisting the Indian state for 55 years" said legal activist and scholar, Babloo Loitongbom.

=== United States leaked diplomatic cables ===
The United States diplomatic cables leak has disclosed that Indian government employees agree to acts of human rights violations on part of the Indian armed forces and various paramilitary forces deployed in the north east parts of India especially Manipur. The violations have been carried out under the cover of this very act. Governor S .S. Sidhu admitted to the American Consul General in Kolkata, Henry Jardine, that the Assam Rifles in particular are perpetrators of violations in Manipur which the very same cables described as a state that appeared more of a colony and less of an Indian state.

=== Santosh Hegde commission on Manipur encounter deaths ===
A high-power commission headed by the retired Supreme Court judge, N. Santosh Hegde was constituted in January 2013 to probe six encounter deaths in Manipur. The committee, comprising former Supreme Court judge Santosh Hegde, ex-CEC J M Lyngdoh and a senior police officer, has said in its report that the probe showed that none of the victims had any criminal records. The judicial commission set up by the Supreme Court is trying to make the controversial Armed Forces Special Powers Act (AFSPA) more humane, and the security forces more accountable. The committee has suggested fixing a time frame of three months for the central government to decide whether to prosecute security personnel engaged in extrajudicial killings or unruly behaviour in insurgency-hit regions. The commission noted that AFSPA was an impediment to achieving peace in regions such as Jammu and Kashmir and the North East. The commission also said the law needs to be reviewed every six months to see whether its implementation is actually necessary in states where it is being enforced. About Section 6 of the act, which guarantees protection against prosecution to the armed forces, the report said: "It is not that no action can be taken at all. Action can be taken but with prior sanction of the Central Government."

=== Justice Jeevan Reddy Commission ===
The commission recommended repealing AFSPA as "the Act is a symbol of hate, oppression, and instrument of high-handedness". It had submitted its report on 06.06.2005. After 10 years, the government of India rejected the recommendation made by Justice Jeevan Reddy Commission to repeal the AFSPA.

=== Second Administrative Reforms Commission ===
The second Administratively Reforms Commission (ARC) in its fifth report on "Public Order", recommended to repeal of Armed Forces Special Powers Act, 1958. It commented that its scrapping would remove sentiments of discrimination and alienation among the people of the North East India. The commission recommended to amend the Unlawful Activities (Prevention) Act, 1967 inserting a new chapter to deploy the armed forces of the Union in the North eastern States. It supported a new doctrine of policing and criminal justice inherent in an inclusive approach to governance.

=== Supreme Court of India ===
Supreme Court said that any encounter carried out by armed forces in the garb of AFSPA should be subjected to thorough inquiry. In the words of supreme court "It does not matter whether the victim was a common person or a militant or a terrorist, nor does it matter whether the aggressor was a common person or the state. The law is the same for both and is equally applicable to both. This is the requirement of a democracy and the requirement of preservation of the rule of law and the preservation of individual liberties."

== See also ==
- Armed Forces Act
- Irom Sharmila Chanu
- Indian Army atrocities in Northeast India
