= Gopali Youth Welfare Society =

Non-governmental organization in West Bengal

- Abbreviation: GYWS
- Formation: 2002
- Founder: Mrinal Kanti Bhanja
- Founded at: Gopali
- Type: NGO
- Website: gyws.org
- IITians empowering youth for BETTER TOMORROW

Gopali Youth Welfare Society, known as GYWS, is a government-registered non-governmental organization in West Bengal. It was founded in 2002 and registered under the West Bengal Societies Registration Act, 1961 on April 20, 2005. It is run by IIT Kharagpur students under the guidance of IIT Kharagpur professors and Gopali village residents. The main areas that GYWS focuses on are child education, women empowerment, and the abolition of child labor. It has launched a free education initiative, social awareness drives, and vocational training programs.

== History ==
GYWS was founded in 2002 and registered under the West Bengal Societies Registration Act, 1961, on April 20, 2005. Since then, GYWS has taken many initiatives to achieve its vision.

== Media Coverage ==
GYWS has been publishing various articles on social and mainstream media. The articles are written both in national and regional newspapers and published in 3 different languages: English, Hindi and Bengali. GYWS has also conducted several workshops and events and their achievements have been mentioned in several newspapers, the latest being about the CoviRelief drive. During the Corona period, GYWS shifted to digital media. They had taken several initiatives to help the people of Gopali village and it was produced in the digital media. The link to the same can be found here. The then HRD minister, Mr. Ramesh Pokhriyal, had also posted on Twitter about the work they did during the Covid period.

=== Pratirav ===
Pratirav is the quarterly newsletter of the Gopali Youth Welfare Society. Pratirav covers a broad range of subjects that not only include the various social issues but also address the daily needs.

== Workshops ==
GYWS had also conducted various knowledge sessions in April last year. Amongst these was the “Tech as a Tool” session with Datakind- an organization depicting the power of data science in the service of humanity. The session began with a brief overview of what programs Datakind conducts- such as the Datakind Labs, DataCorps to DataDive, and Community Events. They also spoke about how machine learning is helping them to work for various underprivileged communities. At the end of the session, a doubt clearing session was held on subjects such as Natural language processing. The various questions were satisfactorily answered by the panelists. The session concluded with a discussion on how technology is a two-edged sword, and one needs to be as careful while using it.

GYWS has conducted various programs for the students and teachers of Jagriti Vidya Mandir. PACE, that is Parents as Co-educators, was one of them. This was done to emphasize the role of the parents in teaching their ward. Activities were sent to the students that had to be done every day and submitted within a week. Updates were taken over the weekend. A teacher training workshop was also held to emphasize the importance of activity-based learning. Teachers were also taught the use of modern-day tools using which the students could understand the various concepts better.
