= People's Vigilance Committee on Human Rights =

People's Vigilance Committee on Human Rights (PVCHR)
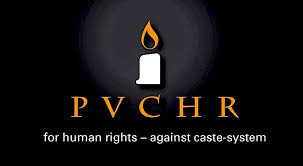
- Founded: 1996
- Type: Non-profit; NGO
- Location: Head office: SA 4/2 A Daulatpur, Varanasi- 221002 India
- Fields: Human Rights, Sustainable Development Goals, Democracy and pluralism
- Key people: Lenin Raghuvanshi, Shruti Nagvanshi, Sant Vivek Das, Mahendra Pratap Singh, Prof. Shahena Rizvi, Lal Bahadur Ram and Jai Kumar Mishra
- Website: www.pvchr.asia www.janmitranyas.in

The People's Vigilance Committee on Human Rights (in Hindi:मानवाधिकार जननिगरानी समिति ) is an Indian non-governmental organisation and membership-based movement which work to ensure basic rights for marginalised groups in Indian society, e.g. children, women, Dalits and tribes to establish rule of law through participatory activism against extrajudicial killing, police torture, hunger, bonded labour and injustice by hegemonic masculinity of the caste system and patriarchy. PVCHR ideology is inspired by the father of the Dalit movement and modern nation state, Dr. B. R. Ambedkar, and father of the nation Mahatma Gandhi, who struggled against patriarchy & the hierarchical caste system. PVCHR and its founders were nominated for the Nobel Peace Prize for their efforts to combat masculinity driven militarist traditions, for their contribution to bettering conditions for peace in world and for acting as driving force in efforts to prevent the use of masculinity driven militarist traditions as a weapon of war and conflict. PVCHR was founded in 1996 by Dr. Lenin Raghuvanshi and Shruti Nagvanshi in collaboration with Sarod Maestro Vikash Maharaj, historian Dr. Mahendra Pratap and poet Gyanendra Pati. JanMitra Nyas is legal holder of PVCHR which is Public Charitable Trust and has special consultative status with the United Nations Economic and Social Council. PVCHR was honored as a "Friend of German Parliament" during a significant dinner meeting with Vice President Claudia Roth at Lodhi Garden Restaurant on February 20, 2015. This recognition marked a crucial milestone in PVCHR's international advocacy for human rights. The event symbolized a deepening partnership between PVCHR and the German Parliament, emphasizing shared commitments to advancing global human rights.

Patron: Justice Z.M. (Zak) Yacoob, Ex-judge, Constitution Court of South Africa & Chancellor of University of Durban, South Africa.

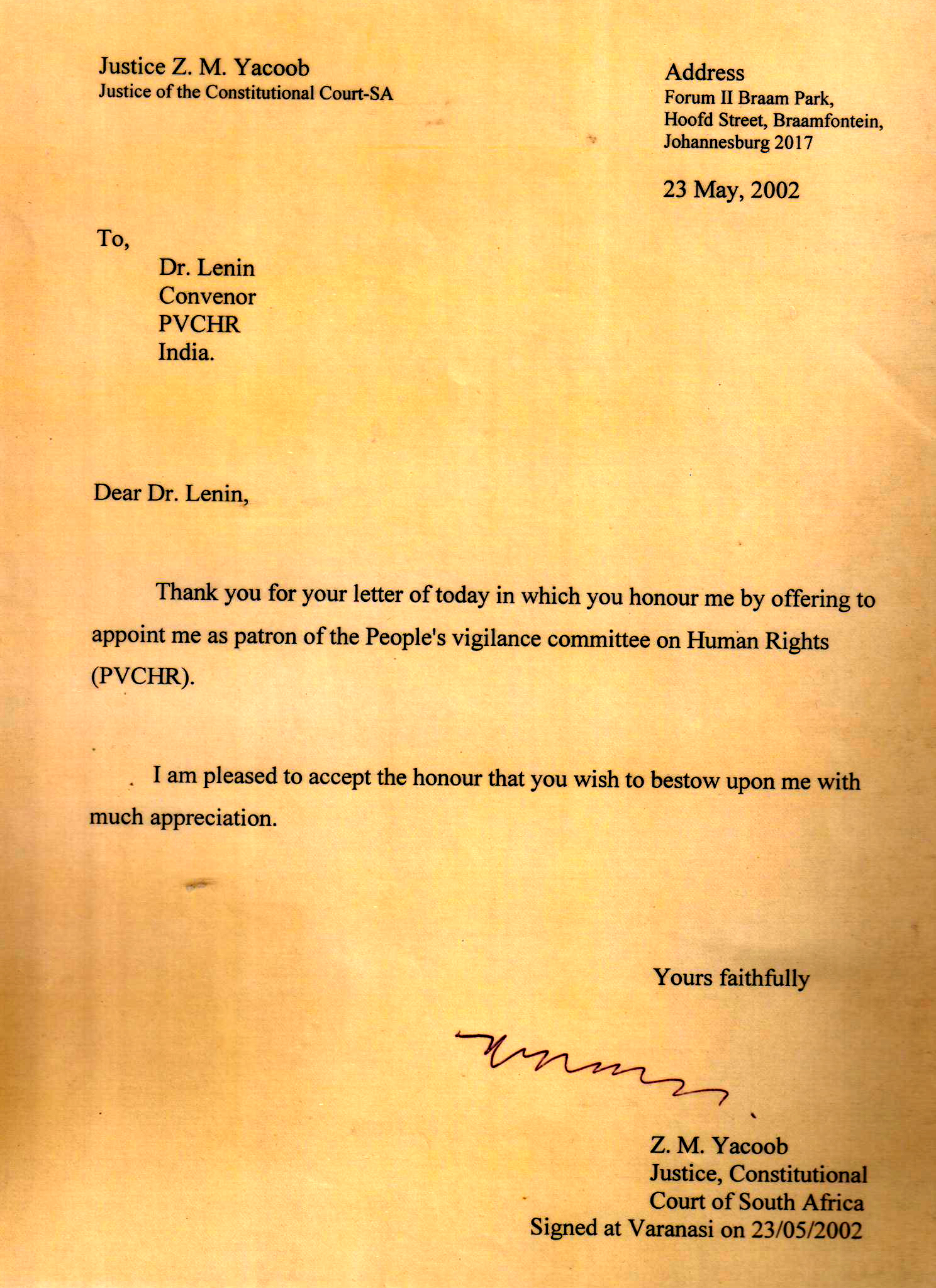
Letter from the Patron: Justice Z.M. (Zak) Yacoob, Former Judge of the Constitutional Court of South Africa and Chancellor of the University of Durban, South Africa.

== PVCHR's work ==
=== Vision ===
To establish a true, vibrant and fully entrenched democratic society through the concept of Jan Mitra where there shall be no violation of civil rights granted to a citizen by the state.

=== Mission ===
To provide basic rights to all, to eliminate situations which give rise to exploitation of vulnerable and marginalized groups and to start a movement for a people-friendly society (Jan Mitra Samaj) through an inter-institutional approach.

=== Core Values ===
- Equity
- Fraternity
- Non-violence
- Participatory democracy
- Secularism
- Justice – Rule of Law

=== Core Focus ===
- Freedom and pluralistic democracy
- Education
- Economic empowerment
- Digital transformation
- Governance, sustainable development and human rights

== Working Approach ==
- Accurate investigation and documentation of human rights violations connected with advocacy, publication and networking on a local, national and international level
- Direct support and solidarity to marginalized and survivors in general and women, Dalit, minorities, tribes, and children in particular. Bring learning of gaps, challenges, and best practices for institutional reform against hegemonic masculinity.
- Creating models of non-violent and democratic communities (people-friendly villages, torture-free villages)
- Building up local institutions and supporting them with active human rights networks
- Creating a democratic structure for the ‘voiceless’ to enable them access to the constitutional guarantees of modern India in the context of the Universal Declaration of Human Rights (UDHR)
- Empowering marginalized communities through capacity building based on human dignity, hope, honor and justice process-based organisational building and access to information
- Promoting a culture of human rights and conflict transformation for sustainable peace based on pluralistic democracy, rule of law and participatory inclusive democracy
- Linking local and international human rights together to support the marginalized and survivors
- Linking grassroots activities and international human rights networks and institutions

=== Strategy ===
1. Practice to policy: peoples’ advocacy
2. Policy to practice: The model of Jan Mitra Village (People-friendly villages and urban ghettos) based on active listening, empathy for hope, honour and dignity
3. Organization building/capacity building

=== Comprehensive programs ===
- Comprehensive program for survivors of torture and organised violence
- Comprehensive program for model villages
- Comprehensive program for women and children sectors
- Program for national lobbying, campaigning, and advocacy
- Program for international solidarity, partnership and networking

=== Geographical Focus ===
Intensively in Eastern (Varanasi, Jaunpur, Sonbhadra, Allahabad, and Ambedkar Nagar) and western (Aligarh, Moradabad, Meerut, Badaun and Aligarh) regions of Uttar Pradesh and Koderma district of Jharkhand. Through networking, working in 16 states of India with the involvement of 99 organisations.

=== Target Communities ===
- Tribal communities
- Minorities
- Dalits
- Other backward caste
- Survivors of torture and organised violence

=== Membership ===
72000 as neo-Dalit communities comprising progressive people from upper caste, OBC, tribal and minorities.PVCHR was honoured at the 4th SocioFare Awards for its outstanding grassroots work in promoting and protecting human rights, particularly for marginalized and vulnerable communities in India.

== PVCHRs' Work in academic sphere ==
PVCHR has been mentioned in follows academic sphere:

- On Management Board of Global India: Global India-an Ireland-based Horizon 2020 funded Marie Sklodowska-Curie European Training Network. The network is composed of 6 different EU Universities and has 9 partners in India. PVCHR is one of member of management board.
- Narrative Reconciliation as Rights Based Peace Praxis: Custodial Torture, Testimonial Therapy, and Overcoming Marginalization: This paper Published by Canadian Mennonite University looks at how marginalized communities utilize discursive practices to contest against an unresponsive state malfeasance and hegemonic bureaucracy to ensure basic rights and state services for the marginalized. Focusing on the People's Vigilance Committee for Human Rights (PVCHR), a member-based human rights movement in Varanasi, Uttar Pradesh, the paper aims to tell the unique story of PVCHR's work to combat custodial torture through an innovative method called "testimonial therapy." The testimonial therapy process is aimed at producing both legal testimony and cathartic release of suffering among torture survivors. In underscoring the importance of attention to narrative practices, the paper, while not overlooking narrative's risks, focuses on the practical opportunities that narrative practices create for peace builders.
- Book on anti-caste work of TBM, BAMCEF, and PVCHR written by Jeremy Rinker, Ph.D. : Elaborating the significance of each of these organizations, Rinker writes that as "the vanguard of turning all of India into Buddhists" the TBM activists promote Ambedkar Buddhist identity among Dalits, seeing this as the first step towards re-establishing Buddhism in postcolonial India. In contrast, the author points out that PVCHR stands for a range of civil rights in the localities it serves. Rinker notes that PVCHR was founded by "an educated upper-caste Kshatriya," Dr. Lenin Raghuvanshi, and his wife, Shruti Nagvanshi. For the author this has its own advantages. That is, "a high caste working for the low-caste rights places him [Lenin Raghuvanshi] in a socially complicated position with both elites and the less fortunate downtrodden." In fact, for Rinker PVCHR is a "neo-Dalit movement," although he does not explain what he means by neo-Dalit vis-a-vis the category Dalit (which means "oppressed" or "broken"). Even as PVCHR functions as a "neo-Dalit" organization, it has an inclusive focus by working with communities that are "Dalits, Adivasis, Muslims, and other excluded segments of the Indian population." Cultural, religious, and historical aspects and identities are not part of PVCHR's agenda, the author explains. In Rinker's analysis, the BAMCEF, in divergence to TBM and PVCHR, stands for "Phule-Ambedkarite ideology." That is, BAMCEF aims to combine the thoughts and practices of anticaste leaders from Maharashtra, those of Jotirao Phule (1827–1890) and Ambedkar (1890–1956), to spread their relevance in the all-India political transformation.
- Testimonial therapy. A pilot project to improve psychological well-being among survivors of torture in India published at Torture Journal: Although this small pilot study without control groups or prior validation of the questionnaire does not provide high-ranking quantitative evidence or statistically significant results for the effectiveness of our version of the testimonial method, we do find it likely that it helps improve the well being in survivors of torture in this particular context. However, a more extensive study is needed to verify these results, and better measures of ICF activities and participation (A and P) functions should be used. Interviews with human rights activists reveal that it is easier for survivors who have gone through testimonial therapy to give coherent legal testimony.
- Testimonial Therapy: Impact on social participation and emotional wellbeing among Indian survivors of torture and organized violence: Traumatizing events, such as torture, cause considerable impairments in psycho-social functioning. In developing countries, where torture is often perpetrated, few resources exist for the provision of therapeutic or rehabilitating interventions. The current study investigated the effectiveness of Testimonial Therapy (TT) as a brief psycho-social intervention to ameliorate the distress of Indian survivors of torture and related violence.
- From Hunger Deaths to Healthy Living:A Case Study of Dalits in Varanasi District, Uttar Pradesh, India: The success story presented in the article provides insight to learn and theorize working models of Dalit empowerment and checking caste-based discrimination.
- Conscientisation of Untouchables in Indian Society: The practice of untouchability, though constitutionally outlawed, has been deeply ingrained in the socio-cultural contours of India. It has its roots in the caste system, a traditional form of apartheid, which is still widely prevalent in various spheres of Indian social life. ‘Dalits’ who are at the lowest rung of caste hierarchy, have been typically experiencing discrimination and social exclusion in myriad of ways. Some expressions of untouchability are – the Dalits are invariably having thatched houses at the periphery of the village; their infants did not receive immunization, their children did not get supplementary nutrition, as upper-caste healthcare functionaries do not touch Dalits to maintain their ‘purity’; and children were denied enrolment in schools. There is no dearth of pro-poor programmes, but their benefits hardly reached the impoverished Dalits. Located at the villages of Varanasi district of Uttar Pradesh, India, Dalit inhabitants for generations together have been living in deplorable conditions. People's Vigilance Committee on Human Rights (PVCHR), an NGO, worked extensively in these villages for several years. As both upper-caste perpetrators and Dalit-victims had internalised their respective superior-inferior status as part of their identity since early childhood, breaking the psychological barriers was the most difficult challenge. With the framework of rights based approach, awareness generation, reflection and conscientisation were the strategies used to deal with intra-psychic barriers. The paper highlights the process of mobilization of the Dalits to voice their concerns, fight for justice and pave way to their own empowerment and to build an egalitarian and just social order.
- Margin to Center stage: Empowering Dalits in India: This book is an attempt to fulfill a widely felt need for documenting the process of empowerment of marginalized and oppressed groups and communities at the grassroots. It has traced and recorded consistent and rigorous efforts of a group of individuals who have brought positive change in the lives of disadvantaged and downtrodden people. Located in Varanasi, Uttar Pradesh, India, this book sketches the plight, struggle for survival, and fight for decent living, dignity and rights among the downtrodden and marginalized Dalits who learnt to raise their voice against the injustice and tyranny. It highlights the efforts for an egalitarian social order by people who ordinarily are resource-less and powerless.
- Freedom from Labour Bondage—A Case of Dalit Empowerment from Varanasi, Uttar Pradesh, India:It presents the process of rescue, release and rehabilitation of bonded labourers of the village through the interventions of a civil society organization—PVCHR. The case study provides relevance for praxis and theorization of Dalit empowerment.
- Fostering Human Rights Advocacy: PVCHR's Impactful Collaboration and MOU with Shoolini University: At the International Conference on Reformative Approaches to Human Rights, PVCHR and Shoolini University sealed a significant partnership through the establishment of a Memorandum of Understanding (MOU). This collaborative initiative reflects their shared commitment to championing human rights and driving impactful initiatives. Emphasizing cooperative efforts, research, and advocacy, the MOU symbolizes a dedication to cultivating a better future. This strategic partnership further amplifies the influence of their collective endeavors, addressing pivotal issues and making substantial contributions to positive social change.
