= Human Rights Documentation Centre =

Non-governmental organization

- Type: Non-profit

The Human Rights Documentation Centre based in Delhi, India, is a non-governmental organization supporting human rights. It has a sister organisation, the South Asia Human Rights Documentation Centre, with which it publishes a journal, Human Rights Features (first issue, June 2006).

== See also ==
- Ravi Nair
