= National Girl Child Day =

National day in India

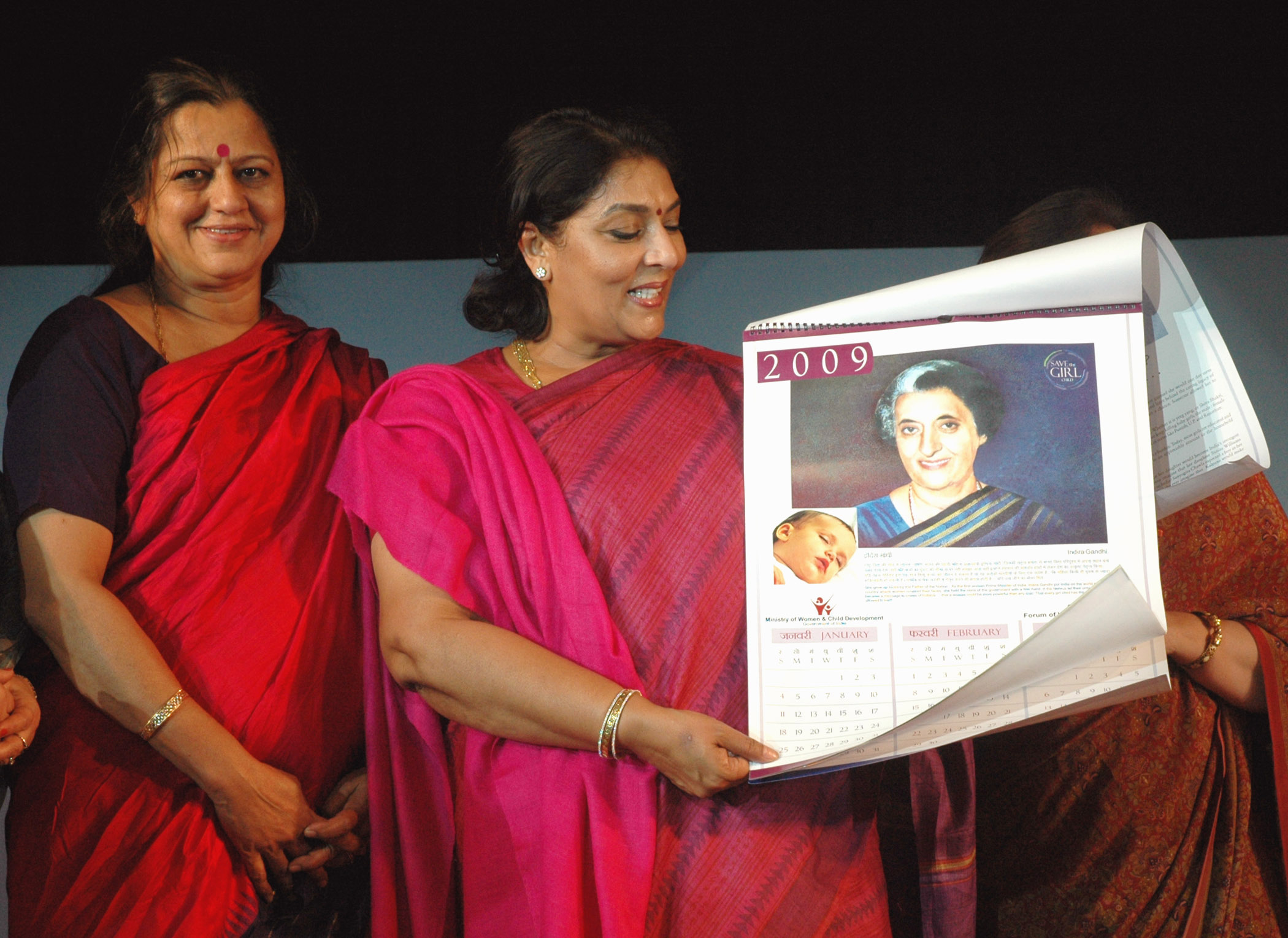
- The Minister for Women and Child Development, Renuka Chowdhury releasing a calendar, at the launching of new initiatives for the welfare of Girl Child and logo for National Girl Child Day, in New Delhi on January 19, 2009
- Official name: National Girl Child Day
- Observed by: India
- Type: National
- Significance: Promoting awareness of issues facing girl child in India, such as education, nutrition, child marriage, legal rights, and medical care, protection, honour.
- Date: January 24
- Frequency: Annual

The National Girl Child Day is celebrated in India every year on January 24. It was initiated in 2008 by the Ministry of Women and Child Development and the Government of India, to spread public awareness about inequities that girls face in Indian society. The day is celebrated with organized programs including awareness campaigns about Save the Girl Child, child sex ratios, and the creation of a healthy and safe environment for girls. In 2019, the day was celebrated with the theme, 'Empowering Girls for a Brighter Tomorrow'.

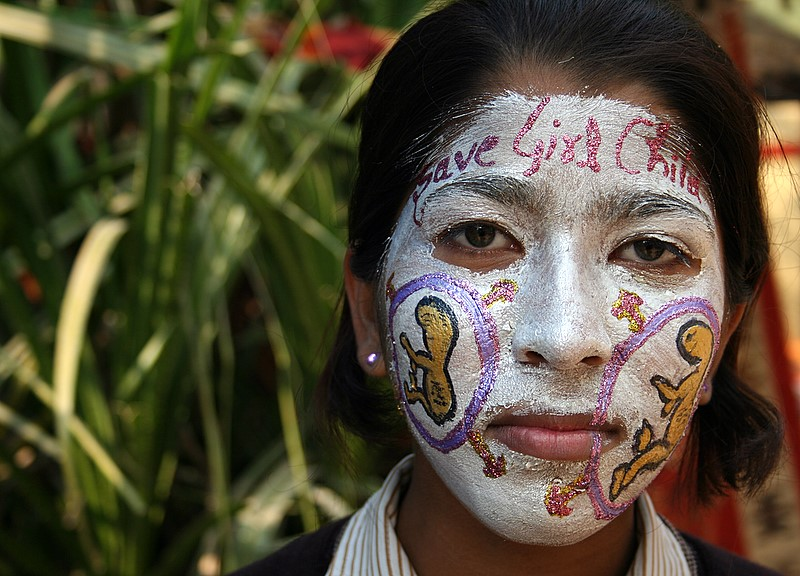
Save girl child – This child won a prize in a face painting competition on National Girl Child Day.

== Objectives ==
- To spread awareness among people about inequalities faced by girls in the country.
- To promote awareness about the rights of girl children.
- To increase awareness on the importance of female education, health, and nutrition.

== See also ==
- International Day of the Girl Child
- Child marriage in India
