= Khangabok =

- Village
- Location in Manipur, India Khangabok (India)
- Coordinates: 24.6084817°N 94.0028737°E
- Country: India
- State: Manipur

Area
  - Total: 20.47 km^{2} (7.90 sq mi)
- Elevation: 781 m (2,562 ft)

Population (2011)
  - Total: 16,344
  - Density: 798.4/km^{2} (2,068/sq mi)
- Demonym: Khangabok Macha

Languages
  - Official: Meetei (Manipuri)
- Time zone: UTC+5:30 (IST)
- PIN: 795138
- Telephone code: 91-3848
- Vehicle registration: MN04
- Sex ratio: 100:101 ♂/♀
- Website: manipur.gov.in

Khangabok is a village located about 25 km south of Imphal, in the state of Manipur, India. Its jurisdiction falls under the Thoubal District Division. Khangabok is one of the largest villages in Manipur in terms of area and population.

The Meeteis are the primary ethnic group populating the village. The language spoken is Meetei (also known as Manipuri), which was included in Eighth Schedule of Indian Constitution in 1992.

== History ==
The name Khangabok is believed to have derived from the tree Khangra (scientific name Dipterocarpus turbinatus) which covered the present-day village area. As people started settling in the area, the trees were cut down, and the place got the name Khangrapokpi meaning where Khangra is grown. The modern derivation of Khangrapokpi is Khangabok.

The Department of Archaeology, Government of Manipur, carried out excavation at Khangabok with an objective of ascertaining the cultural sequence and study of the ethno-archaeological aspects of the site in the campus of Khangabok Maisnam Leikai Boys' Primary School. Many goods comprising beads, bronze rings and plates, bones, potsherds were recovered from burial graves. The excavation revealed only the secondary pot burials with fragments of skull and bone with one to three pots from each burial. In addition, pot of medium size covered with ring-footed bowls were also unearthed. At least four to six thin bronze plates were found with each burial, perhaps used in ceremonial offerings. Two square metal coins were also found which belonged to the reign of Maharaj Garibniwaz (1709–48 AD).

== Demography ==
=== Population ===
Khangabok village is home to around 3520 families. As of 2011 India census, the total population of Khangabok is 16344. 49.83% of the population (8144) is male. The population of children (0–6 years) is 2184 which makes up 13.36% of total population of the village. Average Sex Ratio of Khangabok village is 1007 which is higher than Manipur state average of 985. Child Sex Ratio of the village 919, lower than state average of 930.

=== Literacy ===
The literacy rate of Khangabok village is 72.00% (compared to 76.94% of Manipur). The Male literacy stands at 82.50% while female literacy rate is 61.71%.

=== Religion ===
Most of the people practice dual religion, namely Sanamahism and Hinduism. Lainingthou Ikop Ningthou is the Umanglai (village deity) of Khangabok for which the Lai Haraoba (pleasing of the village deity) is performed annually with traditional fervour in the month of Kalen (equivalent to May in English calendar).

== Geography ==
=== Size and composition ===
Total area of Khangabok is 20.47 square kilometer, making it as the largest village in Thoubal District. Khangabok lies between 24-55 North latitudes and 94-98 East longitudes. Khangabok, because of its large area, is divided into three zones (with 19 Leikais)

Part 1: (6 Leikais namely Shanirou, Sorok Wangma, Awang Leikai, Maning Leikai and part of Khullakpam Leikai, Awang Khunou),

Part 2: (5 Leikais namely Part of Khullakpam Leikai, Moirang Palli, Mayai Leikai, Loishang, and Maisnam Leikai) and

Part 3: (8 Leikais namely Tangkha Leikai, Lamlong, Naorem Leikai, Makha Leikai, Khunou, Leipat Leikai, Lamdaibung Leikai (Kha Khundon) and Cherapur).

Khangabok is bounded in the north-west by Athokpam village, in the north-east by Charangpat village, in the east by Hayel-Labuk village, in the south by Wangjing village and Tentha village, and in the west by Ikop Pat (Lake).

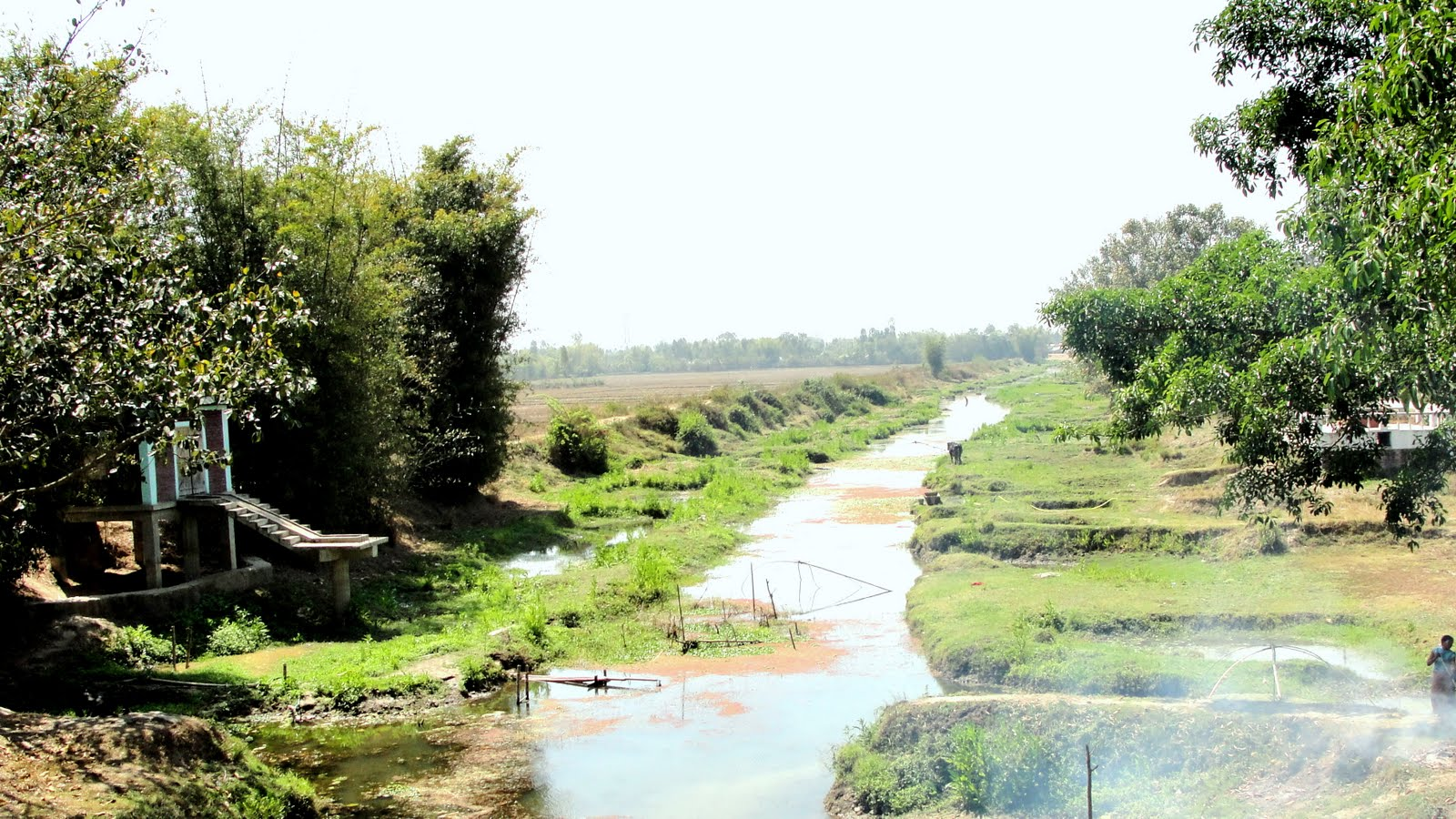
Arong River, Khangabok

=== Climate ===
The climate of Khangabok is largely influenced by the topography of the hilly region which defines the geography of Manipur. Like other places in Manipur, the village is blessed with a generally amiable climate though the winters can be a little chilly. In winter the mercury often falls near zero degree Celsius. The coldest month is January and July experience maximum temperature. The weather remains bright and sunny without the scorch of the sun during the period from October to March. The village is also drenched in rains from the month of May and continues till the middle of October. The downpour ranges from light drizzles to heavy showers. The normal rainfall enriches the soil and helps in agricultural activities and irrigation.

=== Vegetation ===
Khangabok represents the features of flat plain topography. The soil is of the type alluvium and contains small rock fragments, sand and sandy clay. The vegetation consists of a large variety of plants ranging from short and tall grasses, reeds and bamboos to trees of various species. Arundo Donax (yengtou), Leihao, Bamboo, Cane, Eucalyptus etc. are some of the important floras growing in plenty.

=== Drainage system ===
There are four rivers that run through Khangabok and they are named as Karak River, Arong River, Shagonkong (also known as Hogaibi) River and Nongdambi River. The Ikop Pat, which is situated in the western side of Khangabok, is one of the largest lakes in Manipur.

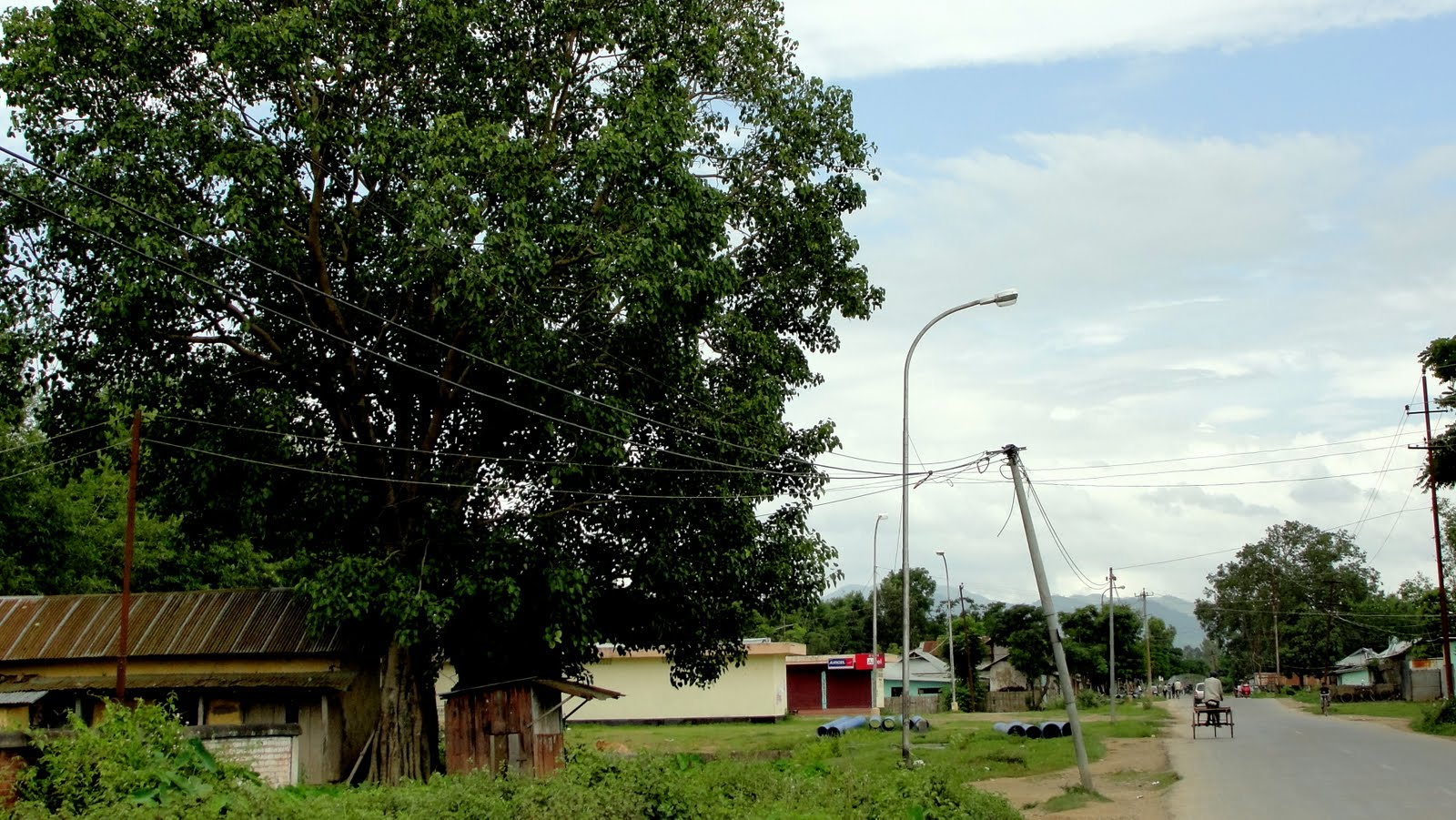
National Highway No. 39, Khangabok

=== Transport and communication ===
The National Highway (India) No. 102 (earlier called as National Highway No. 39) which connects Numaligarh, Assam to the end of Indo-Myanmar Border town Moreh runs through Khangabok. This road is included in AH1, longest route of the Asian Highway Network. Other important intra-village roads connecting various places of village are: Khullak Road, Mamang Road, Sorok Wangma Road, Moirang Palli Road and Makha Road.

== Economy ==
The main economy comes from agriculture. Agricultural products include rice, maize, vegetables and fruits. Khangabok is famous for handicrafts and some of these native exotic handicrafts include bamboo baskets (thumuk) and harvesting mats (yenna phak) made from Giant Cane also known as Arundo Donax (yengtou). Khangabok is famed throughout Manipur for Tule, (Schoenoplectus acutus) know locally as Kouna, based handicrafts too. Kouna is used for making seating mat (phak), stool (mora), chair, mattress and various other crafts.

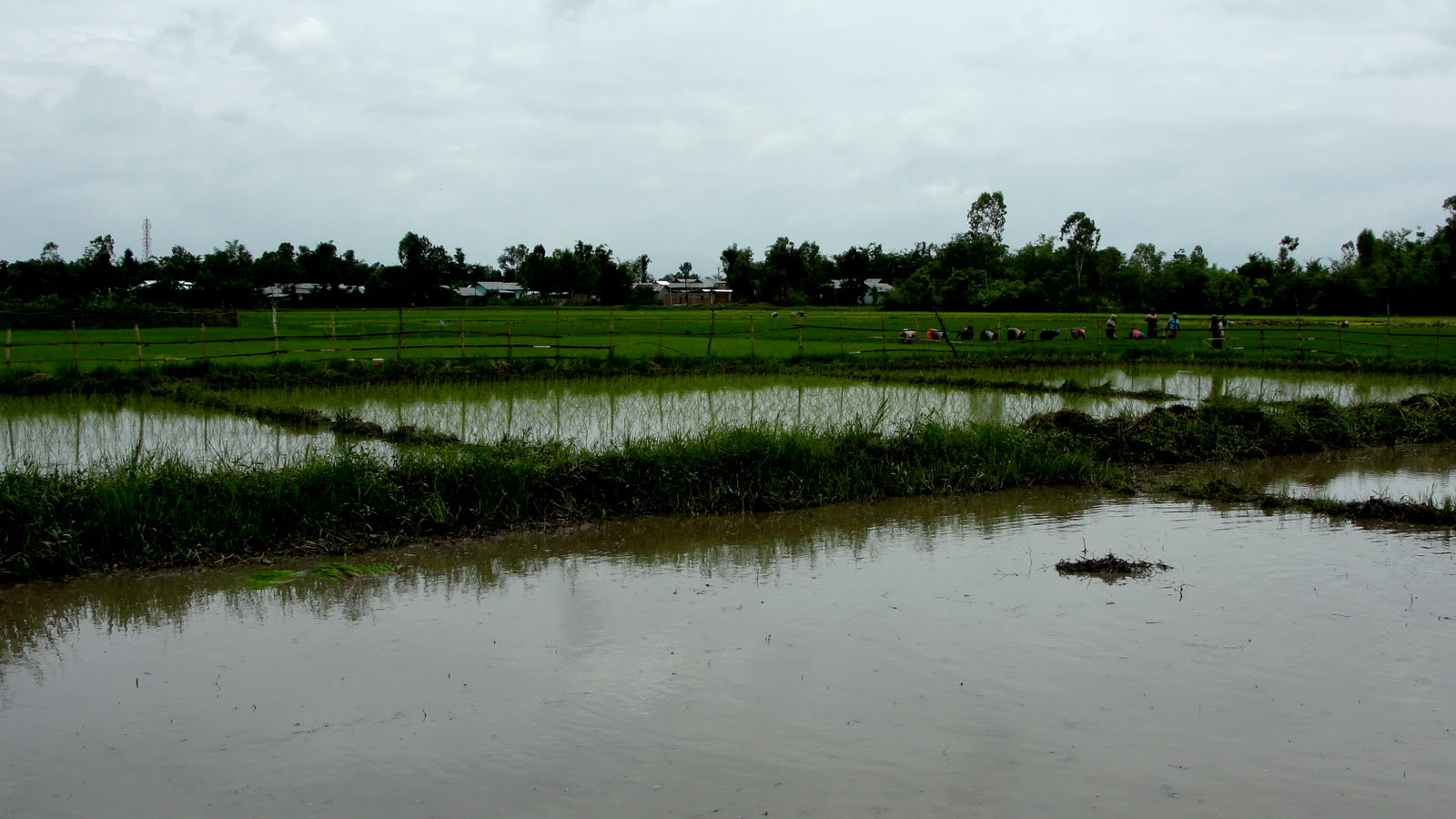
Porobi Paddy Field, Khangabok

The only sugar factory of Manipur is located at Khangabok. However, the factory is no longer operational and instead an outpost for the 3rd Indian Reserved Battalion (IRB) has been set up inside the premise. Other economy comes from fishery, trade, hand-loom products etc.

== Education ==
Khangabok has become a major educational hub in Manipur for pre-college education, thanks to the many prominent schools being established in the village. Some of the schools in Khangabok are:

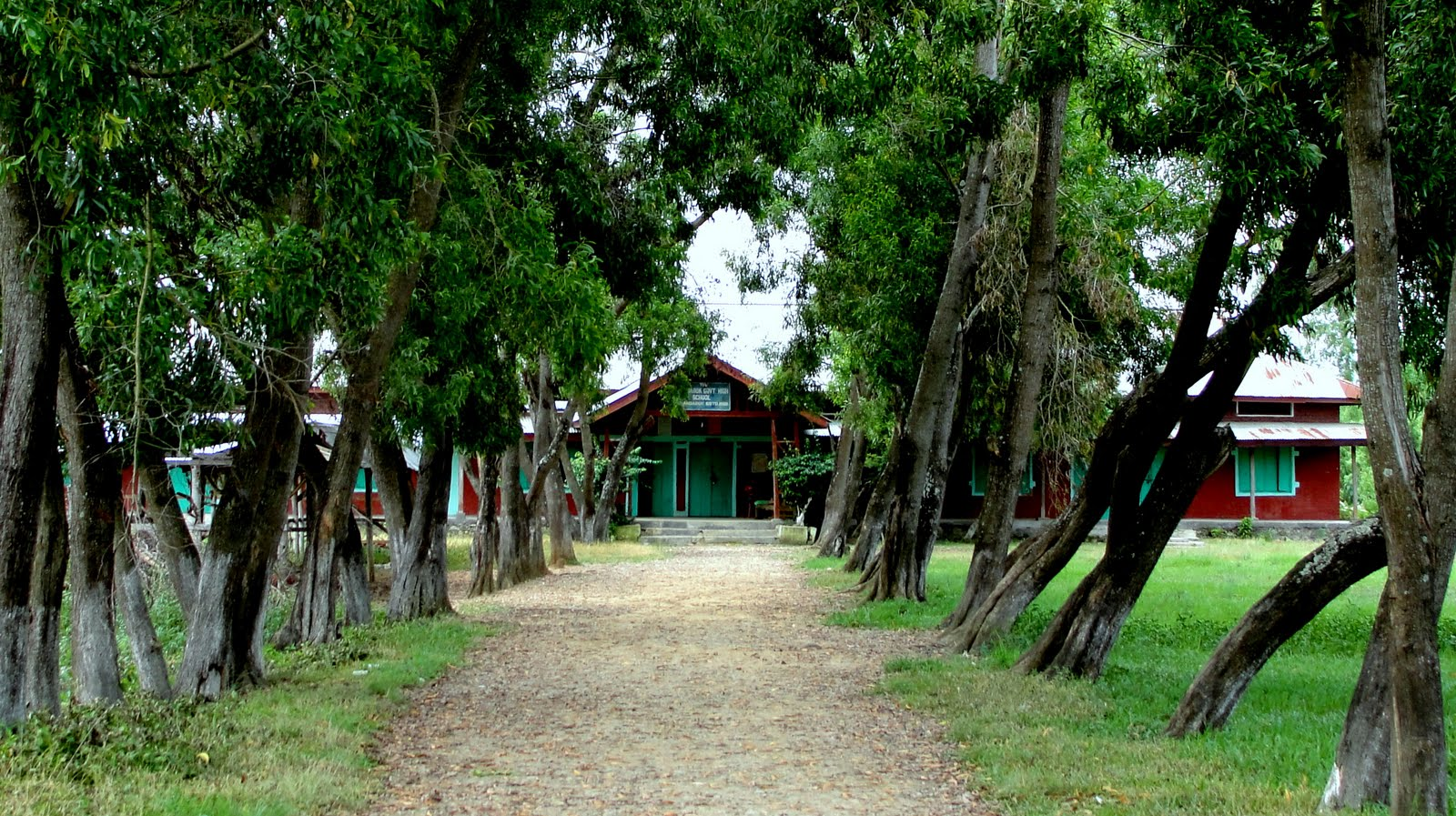
Khangabok Higher Secondary School

=== Higher secondary schools ===
- The K.M. Blooming Higher Secondary School
- The New Public Higher Secondary School
- The Eastern Star Higher Secondary School
- The Khangabok Higher Secondary School

=== High schools ===
- The P.M Unique Academy
- Amuba High School
- Gulap Memorial English School
- Wisdom Foundation
- Yanaki Peace Academy
- BASE Academy

=== Primary schools ===
- Khangabok Maisnam Leikai Boys' Primary School
- Khangabok Mayai Leikai Primary School
- Primary School Khangabok Part I (also known as School Angangbi)
- Khangabok Awang Leikai Primary School
- Khangabok Makha Primary School
- K.S. Learning Temple, Khangabok Makha Leikai
- Khangabok Cherapur Primary School, Cherapur

== Government Institutions ==
Khangabok houses many government institutions such as:

1. District Hospital Management Society
2. District Leprosy Hospital
3. Telephone Exchange BSNL
4. District Fishery Research Centre
5. District Superintendent of Police Headquarters
6. District & Sessions Court
7. Sugar Factory. It is Manipur's first and only sugar factory but not functional anymore.
8. District Rice Research Center
9. District Sericulture Research Center
10. Food Corporation of India
11. Krishi Vigyan Kendra

=== Past & Present MLAs ===
- Late Thokchom Achouba Singh
- Okram Ibobi Singh
- Laishram Jatra Singh
- Okram Landhoni Devi
- Okram Surjakumar (present)

== Important places ==
=== Ikop Pat ===
The lake is situated in western part of Khangabok, at a distance of about 28 km in the south-eastern direction of Imphal and is located at an altitude of 772 m above MSL is 7.5 km in length and 1.8 km in breadth during the rainy season. The surface area Measures 13.5 km^{2} while the depths in the different areas range between 0.93 and 1.59 m. The depths have become much shallower currently. The Lake is physiographically characterized by a saucer shaped basin with gentle slope and a much silted bottom. Physico-chemical analysis of the water samples from the lake reveal highly polluted condition. There occurs rise in the water temperature while the turbidity rate also stands high. The water in many areas is found to be highly acidic (pH-3.6) while in other areas high alkalinity (pH-9.3) has been noticed. Observation of high concentration of dissolved carbon dioxide coupled with lower values of dissolved oxygen in different seasons reveal the deteriorating quality of water.

The Ikop Lake is currently under great human pressure due to heavy encroachments due to the development of farms by a number of fishing co-operative societies.

Ikop Pat is the site where Khamba caught the wild ox of the Khamba-Thoibi legend.

=== Lamlong Keithel (Bazar) ===
This is one of the business markets in Khangabok situated at the junction of Khullakpam Lambi, Makha Lambi and Mamang Lambi.

=== Shri Shri Bangsibudon Temple ===
In 1798, the king of Manipur Bhagyachandra was given an instruction in his dream by Lord Krishna. Accordingly, idol of Shri Abdeita was carved out of a jack-fruit tree and the idol was erected at Lamangdong. Two more idols were sculpted out of the jack fruit tree. One was named Bangshibadan, and was given to a royal attendant who resided at Khangabok. The other idol was Gourarai Prabhu in Sega road. People from various places of Manipur come to Bangshibadan Temple for worshipping. A newly built temple was inaugurated on 23 November 2015.

=== MMRC & Unity Park ===
MMRC Stands for Menjor Multi-Purpose Research Centre and is a multi-dimensional research centre established in 2010 and modelled for tourism and served as a recreation park.

== See also ==
- Thoubal district
- Meitei language
- Manipur
- Ikop Pat
