= List of tourist attractions in Manipur =

The following is a list of notable attractions in Manipur.

== Uniqueness ==
- Hapta Kangjeibung - World's oldest pologround.
- Samban-Lei Sekpil .
- Ima Keithel - Asia's largest only-women market.
- Polo.
- Khongjom War Memorial Complex.
- Loktak Lake - World's only floating lake.
- Keibul Lamjao National Park.
- Shirui lily.
- Sangai deer.
- Ningthouja dynasty .
- Kangla Fort
- Meitei language
- Manipuri dance
- Manipuri pony
- Andro Fire Place

== Forts ==
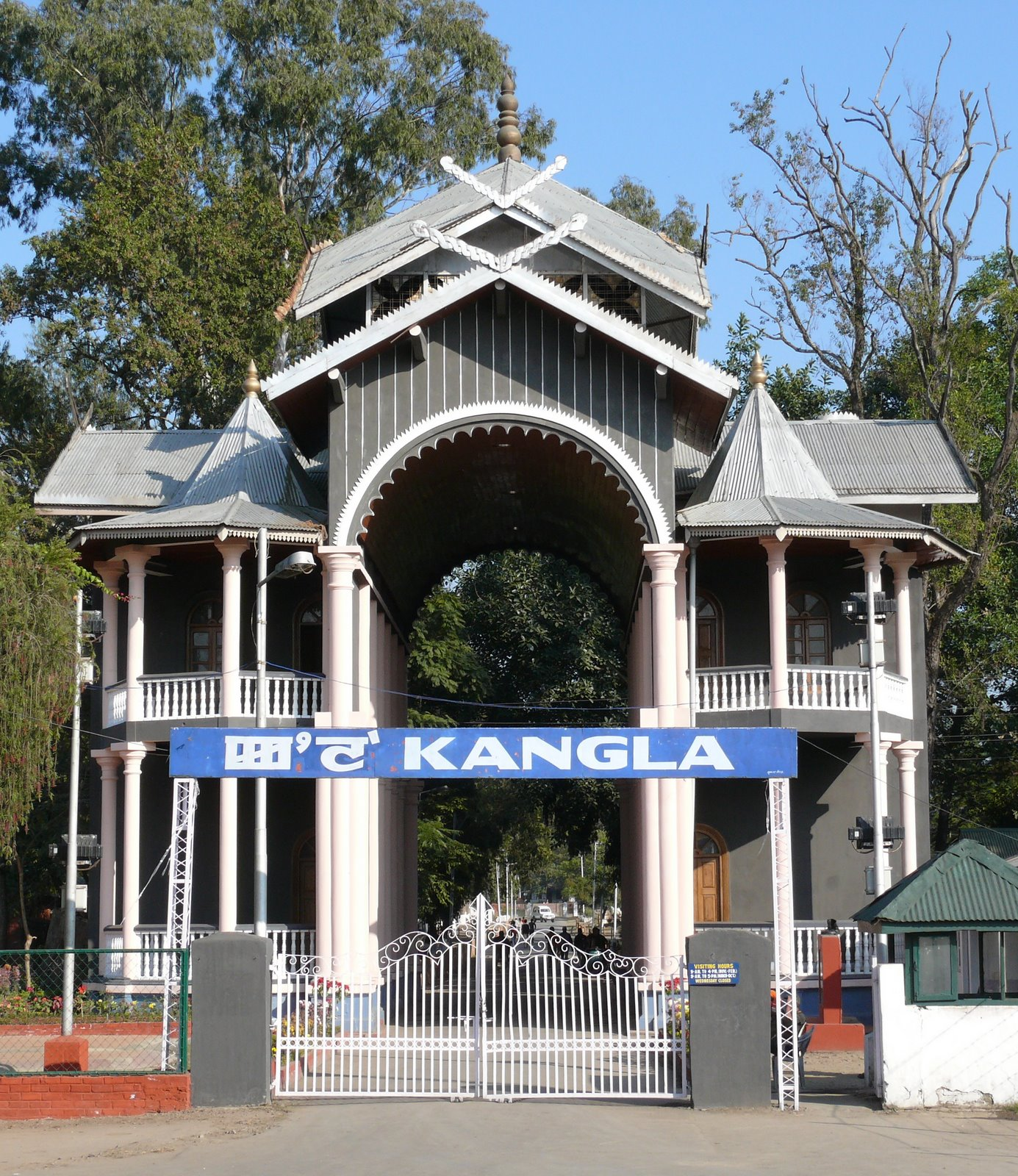
The main entrance of the Kangla Fort, Imphal

- Kangla Fort, on the bank of Imphal River, Manipur is one of the oldest existing forts in the world, with its earliest record of existence dating back to 1445 BC.

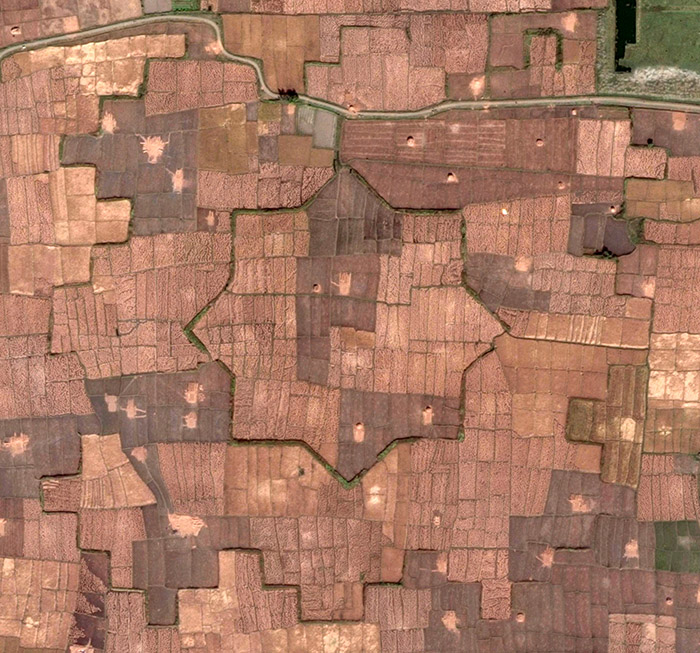
Bihu Loukon Aerial view

- Bihu Loukon, an ancient star shaped mud fort situated in Maklang, Imphal West District, Manipur.

== Adventure zones ==
- Baruni Hill
- Thangjing Hill
- Loktak lake
- Pumlenpat lake
- Mount Koubru
- Ikop Pat lake
- Thanga island
- Kaina Hill
- Keibul Lamjao National Park
- Sirohi National Park

== Ancient Mythology ==
The ancient Manipuri mythology is indigenous to Manipur kingdom. It is also related to Manipuri religion (or Sanamahism), which includes thousands of Gods and Goddesses.

== Temples ==
- Sanamahi Kiyong Temple
- Ibudhou Thangjing Temple
- Sanamahi Temple
- Shree Govindajee Temple
- Kaina Temple
- Shri Radha Raman Temple, Kanchipur
- Ningthoukhong Gopinath Mandir
- Sacred Jackfruit Tree
- Konthoujam Lairembi gi Khubam
- Hiyangthang Lairembi Temple

== Mosques ==
- Jama Mosque, Imphal

== Churches ==
- Phungyo Baptist Church
- St. Joseph's Cathedral, Imphal
- Little Flower School Cathedral
- Kuki Baptist Church
- Kuki Christian Church
- Manipur Baptist Church

== Historical sites ==
- Sacred Jackfruit Tree
- Maibam Lokpa Ching
- Kaina (Manipur)
- Khongjom War Memorial Complex
- Sanamahi Kiyong Temple
- Sanamahi Temple
- Hiyangthang Lairembi Temple
- Bihu Loukon
- Khwairamband Bazar
- INA Martyr's Memorial
- Kangla Palace
- Shree Govindajee Temple
- Ningthoukhong Gopinath Mandir
- Imphal War Cemetery
- Imphal Barracks

== National parks ==
- Keibul Lamjao National Park
- Sirohi National Park

== Wildlife ==
- Sangai deer
- Manipuri pony
- Pengba fish
- Manipur bush rat
- Manipur bush quail
- Mrs. Hume's pheasant

== Plant life ==
- Shirui lily is native to the Shirui Hill of Ukhrul district of Manipur.
- Blue vanda or Kwaklei is a species of Orchid.

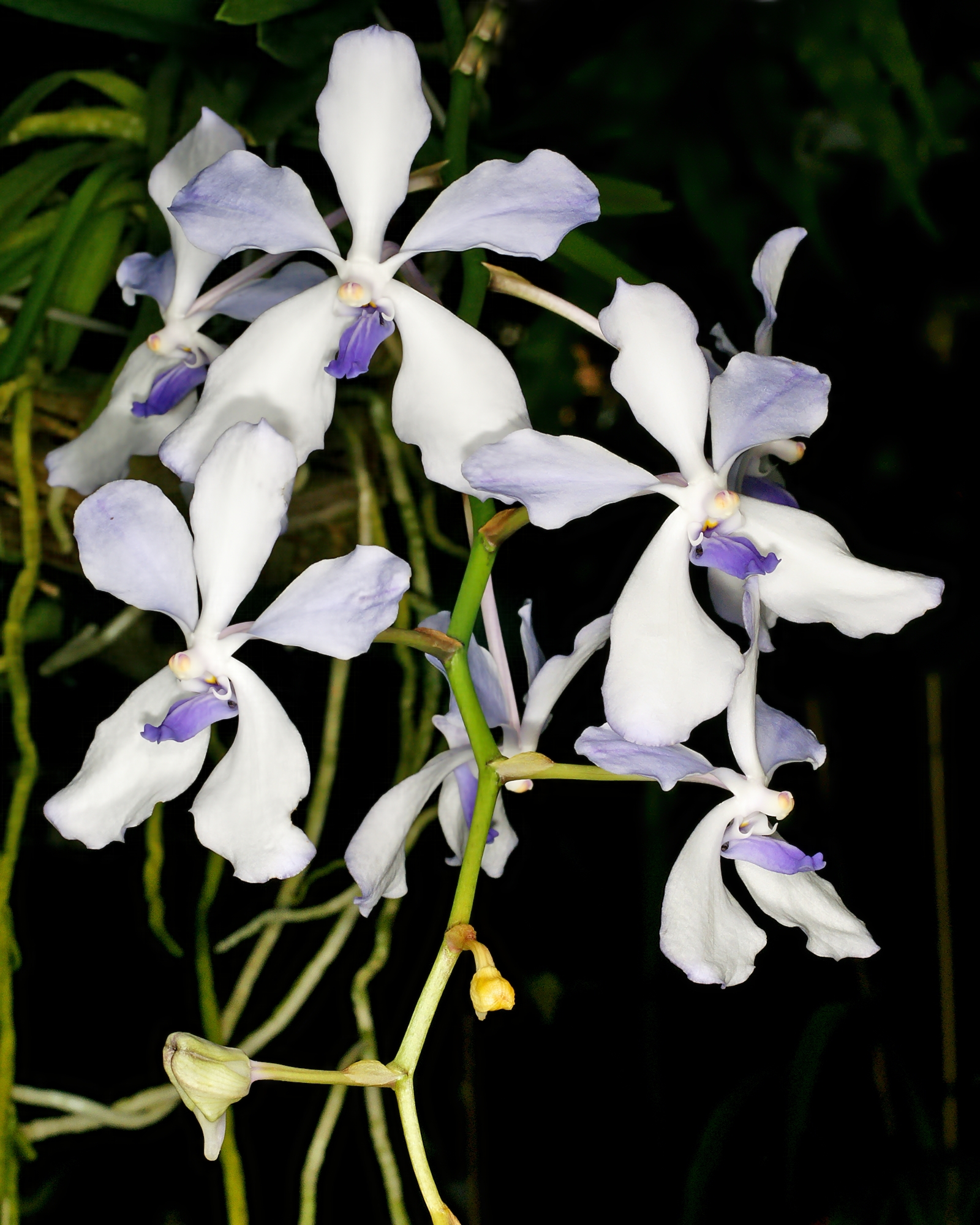
Blue vanda or Kwaklei, of Manipur

- Phoebe hainesiana or Uningthou is a state tree of Manipur, native to the state.

== Palaces ==
- Kangla Palace

== Gardens ==
- Samban-Lei Sekpil
- Kakching garden
- Kangla garden

== Lakes ==
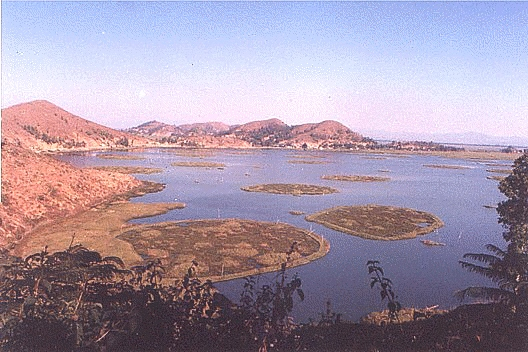
Loktak lake, world's only floating lake in Manipur

- Loktak Lake
- Ikop Pat
- Pumlenpat

== Hill stations ==
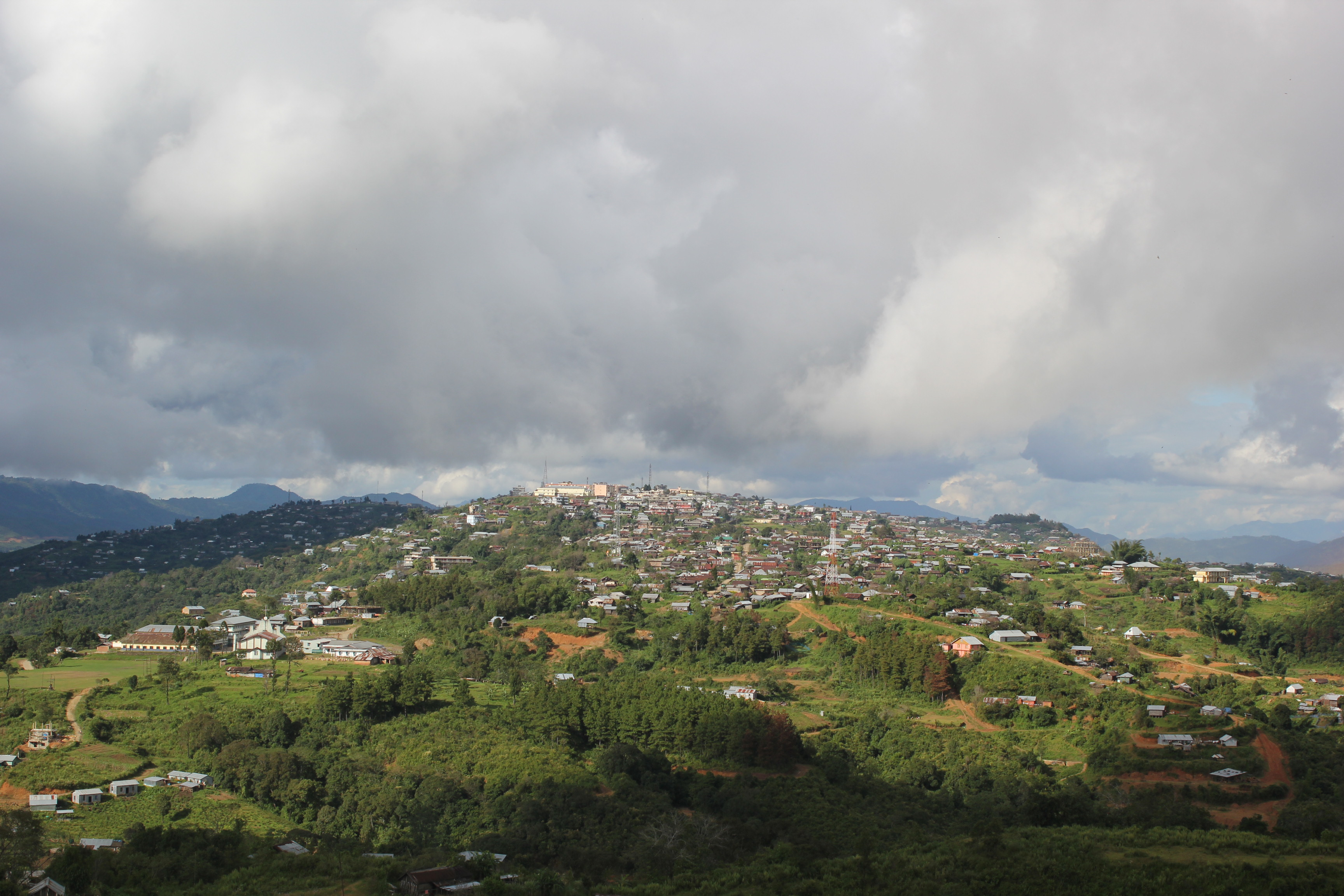
Ukhrul, North Manipur

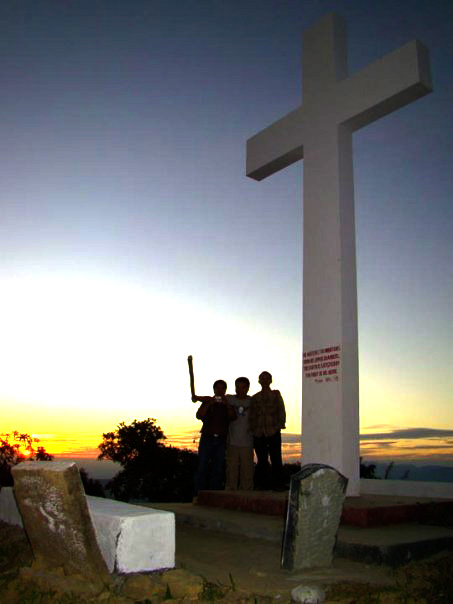
Prayer Mountain, Tamenglong

Manipur houses a number of Hill stations, in numerous Hill Ranges of the state. Following are a few of them:

- Ukhrul
- Tamenglong
- Chandel
- Sadar Hills
- Churachandpur
- Senapati (Tahamzam)
- Tengnoupal
- Noney
- Kamjong
- Pherzawl
- Kangpokpi
- Kaina
- Cheirao Ching

== Festivals ==
Following are a few of the great festivals celebrated in the state:

- Lai Haraoba
- Yaosang
- Imoinu Iratpa
- Ningol Chakouba
- Sanamahi Ahong Khong Chingba
- Mera Hou Chongba
- Mera Chaorel Houba
- Panthoibi Iratpa
- Cheiraoba
- Heikru Hidongba
- Kwaak Taanba
- Sangai festival
- Shirui Lily Festival
- Barak River Festival
- Gaan-Ngai
- Maramfest

== See also ==
- Politics of Manipur
- Sports in Manipur
- Art and culture of Manipur
- Art forms of Manipur
