= Outline of Manipur =

Overview of and topical guide to Manipur

Location of Manipur

The following outline is provided as an overview of and topical guide to Manipur:

Manipur (Meitei: Kangleipak) is a state in northeastern India, with the city of Imphal as its capital. The state covers an area of 22,327 square kilometres (8,621 sq mi). Meitei people (also known as the Manipuris) are the predominant ethnic group of Manipur. Their native language is the Meitei language (officially known as Manipuri language), serving as the lingua franca as well as the sole official language of Manipur, among the different ethnic groups, including the Kuki, Naga, and Pangal peoples, who speak different Sino-Tibetan languages and dialects. Manipur has been at the crossroads of Asian economic and cultural exchange for more than 2,500 years. It has long connected the Indian subcontinent and Central Asia to East/Southeast Asia, Siberia, Micronesia and Polynesia, enabling migration of people, cultures and religions.

Unofficial Flag of Manipur

== General reference ==
=== Names ===
- Pronunciation: /ˈmʌnɪpʊər/
- Common English name(s): Manipur
- Official English name(s): Manipur
- Adjectival(s): Manipuri (refers to region while the Meitei language and the Bishnupriya Manipuri language are also referred to with Manipuri as well)
- Demonym(s): Manipuris

=== Rankings (amongst India's states) ===
- by population: 24th
- by area (2011 census): 24th
- by crime rate (2015): 21st
- by gross domestic product (GDP) (2014): 26th
- by Human Development Index (HDI):
- by life expectancy at birth: (70)
- by literacy rate: (75%)

== Geography of Manipur ==
Manipur is one of the Seven Sister States in India.

Geography of Manipur

- Manipur is: an Indian state and one of the Seven Sister States
- Population of Manipur: 2,855,794 (as of 2011)
- Area of Manipur: 22,327 km2 (8,621 sq mi)
- Atlas of Manipur

=== Location of Manipur ===
- Manipur is situated within the following regions:
  - Northern Hemisphere
  - Eastern Hemisphere
    - Eurasia
      - Asia
        - South-East Asia
          - Northeast India
            - Seven Sister States
- Time zone: Indian Standard Time (UTC+05:30)

=== Environment of Manipur ===
==== Natural geographic features of Manipur ====
- Lakes in Manipur
  - Loktak Lake
  - Pumlenpat
- Rivers in Manipur
  - Barak River
  - Manipur River
  - Imphal River
  - Iril River
  - Nambul River
  - Sekmai River
  - Chakpi River
  - Thoubal River
  - Khuga River
- Valleys in Manipur
  - Barak Valley
  - Imphal Valley

==== Protected areas of Manipur ====
- Keibul Lamjao National Park – the only floating national park in the world. It floats atop Loktak Lake.
- Sirohi National Park
- Yangoupokpi-Lokchao Wildlife Sanctuary
- Manipur Zoological Garden

=== Regions of Manipur ===
==== Ecoregions of Manipur ====
- Mizoram-Manipur-Kachin rain forests
- Northeast India-Myanmar pine forests

==== Administrative divisions of Manipur ====
- Districts of Manipur – there are nine:
  1. Bishnupur district
  2. Chandel district
  3. Churachandpur district
  4. Imphal East district
  5. Imphal West district
  6. Senapati district
  7. Tamenglong district
  8. Thoubal district
  9. Ukhrul district
- Cities of Manipur
  - Capital of Manipur: Imphal

=== Demography of Manipur ===
Demographics of Manipur

== Government and politics of Manipur ==
Government of Manipur

- Form of government:
- Capital of Manipur: Imphal
- Imphal Municipal Corporation
- Elections in Manipur
  - (specific elections)
- Insurgency in Manipur

=== Branches of the government of Manipur ===
Government of Manipur

==== Executive branch of the government of Manipur ====
- Head of state: Governor of Manipur,
- Head of government: Chief Minister of Manipur,
- Council of Ministers of Manipur
- Departments and agencies of the Manipuri government
  - Manipur Public Service Commission

==== Legislative branch of the government of Manipur ====
Manipur Legislative Assembly (unicameral)

- Inner Manipur (Lok Sabha constituency)
- Outer Manipur (Lok Sabha constituency)

==== Judicial branch of the government of Manipur ====
- Manipur High Court

=== Law and order in Manipur ===
- Human rights abuses in Manipur
- Law enforcement in Manipur
  - Manipur Police

== History of Manipur ==
History of Manipur

=== History of Manipur, by period ===
==== Ancient Manipur ====
- Ancient Manipur

==== Medieval Manipur ====
- Kingdom of Kangleipak

==== Colonial Manipur ====
- First Anglo-Burmese War (1824-1826)
- Manipur (princely state) – last of the independent states to be incorporated into British India
- Anglo-Manipuri War
- Princely states in India

==== Contemporary Manipur ====
- Battle of Imphal (1944)
- Instrument of Accession (1947)
- Insurgency in Manipur

=== History of Manipur, by region ===
- History of Chandel district
- History of Imphal East district
- History of Senapati district
- History of Thoubal district
- History of Ukhrul district

== Culture of Manipur ==
Culture of Manipur

- Architecture of Manipur
- Cuisine of Manipur
- Monuments in Manipur
  - Monuments of National Importance in Manipur
  - State Protected Monuments in Manipur
- World Heritage Sites in Manipur
- Meitei inscriptions

=== Art in Manipur ===
- Cinema of Manipur
- Dance of Manipur
- Meitei literature
- Music of Manipur

=== Festivals in Manipur ===
- Lai Haraoba
- Maramfest
- Sajibu Nongma Panba (also known as Sajibu Cheiraoba)
- Sangai festival
- Yaosang

=== Language in Manipur ===
- Languages of Manipur
  - Meitei language
  - Paite
  - Hmar
  - Tangkhul
  - Thadou
- Manipuri surnames

=== People of Manipur ===
- Kom people
- Manipur Tamil community
- Meitei people – majority ethnic group of Manipur.
- Inpui Naga
- Hmar people
- Naga people
- Meitei Pangals
- Tangkhul
- Mao
- Kabui
- Maring Naga
- Maram Naga
- Thadou
- Paite
- Anāl Naga
- Poumei

=== Religion in Manipur ===
Religion in Manipur

- Buddhism in Manipur
  - All Manipur Buddhist Association
- Christianity in Manipur
  - Manipur Baptist Convention
  - Roman Catholic Archdiocese of Imphal
- Hinduism in Manipur
- Sanamahism – indigenous ancient animistic religion

=== Sports in Manipur ===
Sports in Manipur

- Cricket in Manipur
  - Manipur Cricket Association
  - Manipur cricket team
- Football in Manipur
  - All Manipur Football Association
  - Manipur State League
  - Manipur football team

=== Symbols of Manipur ===
Symbols of Manipur

- State animal: Sangai
- State bird: Nongeen
- State flower: Shirui Lily
- State seal: Seal of Manipur
- State tree: Oo-Ningthou

== Economy and infrastructure of Manipur ==
- Communication in Manipur
  - Imphal Free Press
- Tourism in Manipur
- Transport in Manipur
  - Imphal International Airport

== Education in Manipur ==
Education in Manipur

- Institutions of higher education in Manipur
  - Manipur University

== Health in Manipur ==
Health in Manipur

== See also ==
- Outline of India
