= Manipuri dances =

Manipuri dances may refer to:

- Jagois, the dance forms of the culture of Meitei people, the predominant ethnic group of Manipur
- Dances of Manipur
