= William Pettigrew =

William Pettigrew may refer to:

- William Pettigrew (politician) (1825–1906), mayor of Brisbane, Queensland, Australia, and member of the Legislative Council of Queensland
- William Pettigrew (missionary) (1869–1943), British Christian missionary
- Willie Pettigrew (born 1953), Scottish footballer
