= Thangjam Dhabali Singh =

Indian pathologist

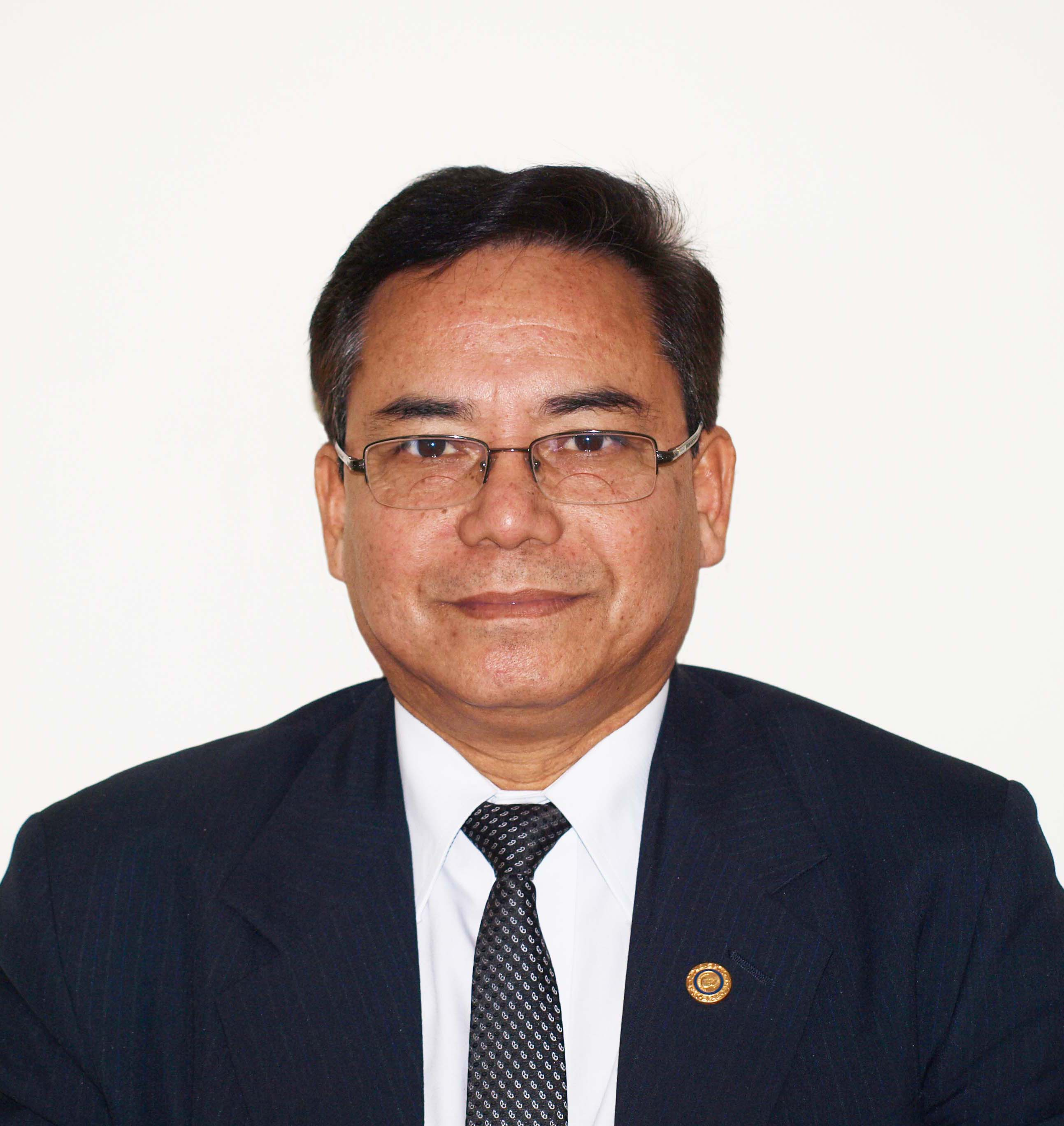
- Born: 1 January 1956 (age 70); Imphal, Manipur, India
- Occupations: Pathologist, Entrepreneur
- Known for: Medical diagnostics, promotion of tourism, entrepreneurship
- Spouse: Dr. Rita Sanjenbam
- Children: Dr. Babina Thangjam, Dr. Momocha Thangjam, Naoba Thangjam
- Parent(s): Thangjam Birchandra Singh, Thangjam Ongbi Maipakpi Devi
- Relatives: Late Thangjam Praffulo Singh, Dr. Thangjam Nabachandra Singh (MD), Thangjam Ningol Lata Devi, Thangjam Shyamo Singh, Thangjam Ningol Pramodini Devi, Thangjam Joykumar Singh, Thangjam Brojen Singh, Thangjam Ningol Premita Devi, Arunkumar Thangjam (sibling)
- Awards: The 2nd ICC Northeast Excellence Award 2010 (awarded by Indian Chamber of Commerce in collaboration with DoNER Ministry) and Order of the Rising Sun, Gold and Silver Rays 2020 (presented by the Government of Japan)
- Website: dhabalithangjam.in

Thangjam Dhabali Singh (or Dhabali Singh Thangjam, born 1 January 1956) is an Indian pathologist, entrepreneur and the chairman and managing director of BABINA Healthcare and Hospitality Industries Pvt Ltd, a company based in Imphal, Manipur with business activities in healthcare and hospitality industry. The government of Japan conferred to him the Order of the Rising Sun, Gold and Silver Rays 2020 for his work on the promotion of ties between India and Japan.

== Biography ==
Thangjam Dhabali Singh was born to Late Thangjam Birchandra and Thangjam Ongbi Maipakpi Devi inImphal on 1 January 1956 in a business family. After obtaining his MBBS degree from Regional Institute of Medical Sciences, Imphal (formerly Regional Medical College), he secured his post graduate degree in pathology from Post Graduate Institute of Medical Education and Research (PGIMER), Chandigarh in 1982. He is the younger brother of Dr. Thangjam Nabachandra Singh, a renowned pediatrician who earned his MBBS from Mahatma Gandhi Memorial Medical College, Indore, and his Doctor of Medicine (MD) in Pediatrics from AIIMS Delhi. In 1983, Dr. Dhabali went back to his home state, Manipur and set up BABINA Diagnostics, a medical diagnostic centre in Imphal as his first business venture. The following year, he joined Regional Institute of Medical Sciences, Imphal in the Department of Pathology as a teaching faculty member and continued working there until 1994 when he voluntarily retired from service as associate professor. Working as its laboratory director, Dr Thangjam Dhabali Singh is considered to have made BABINA Diagnostics into a modern medical diagnostic centre that provided a range of diagnostic services to the people of Manipur and Northeast India. In 2020, he set up BABINA Specialty Hospital, a cancer hospital in Imphal in collaboration with American Oncology Institute.

Thangjam Dhabali Singh diversified his business activities in hospitality industry after he formed his company, BABINA Healthcare and Hospitality Industries Pvt Ltd in 2007. The company promoted The Classic Hotel in Imphal in 2009, which was the first three-star category hotel in Manipur. It also promoted its second hotel, Classic Grande in 2014 as a member of Radisson Individuals.

Thangjam Dhabali Singh is the founding president of Manipur Tourism Forum (MTF), an organisation that works for the promotion of tourism in Manipur. Manipur Tourism Forum operates The Imphal Peace Museum at Maibam Lokpa Ching, Manipur (also called Red Hills) which is a historical site of World War II with support from Nippon Foundation and Sasakawa Peace Foundation.

== Family ==
Dr. Thangjam Dhabali is married to Dr. Rita Sanjenbam, and together they have three children: Dr. Babina Thangjam, Dr. Momocha Thangjam, and Naoba Thangjam. His children have followed in his footsteps, with both Dr. Babina and Dr. Momocha Thangjam pursuing medical careers.

Dr. Dhabali Singh comes from a distinguished family with deep roots in healthcare, business, and politics. His older brother, Dr. Thangjam Nabachandra Singh, is a prominent pediatrician and neonatologist who has had a major impact on child healthcare in Manipur. Other notable siblings include Thangjam Joykumar Singh, a successful entrepreneur and the founder of Likla, a food processing company; Thangjam Arunkumar, a politician and businessman who has represented the Wangkhei Assembly constituency in the Manipur Legislative Assembly; and Thangjam Brojen, a retired police officer and former United Nations Peacekeeper who has been an outspoken advocate for peace and justice in Manipur. Thangjam Brojen was also selected as one of the Associate Security Advisors for the United Nations.

The Thangjam family is well-regarded for their collective contributions to the development of Manipur, both in the fields of healthcare, business, politics, and advocacy, with Dr. Dhabali Singh's leadership in the Babina Group standing out in particular.

== Awards ==
The 2nd ICC Northeast Excellence Award 2010 awarded by Indian Chamber of Commerce (ICC) in collaboration with Ministry of Development of North Eastern Region (DoNER)

Order of the Rising Sun, Gold and Silver Rays 2020 presented by the government of Japan
