= Khongjom War Memorial Complex =

War memorial in Manipur

Khongjom War Memorial Complex is a war memorial commemorating the Anglo-Manipur War. It is situated at Khongjom, Thoubal district of Manipur.

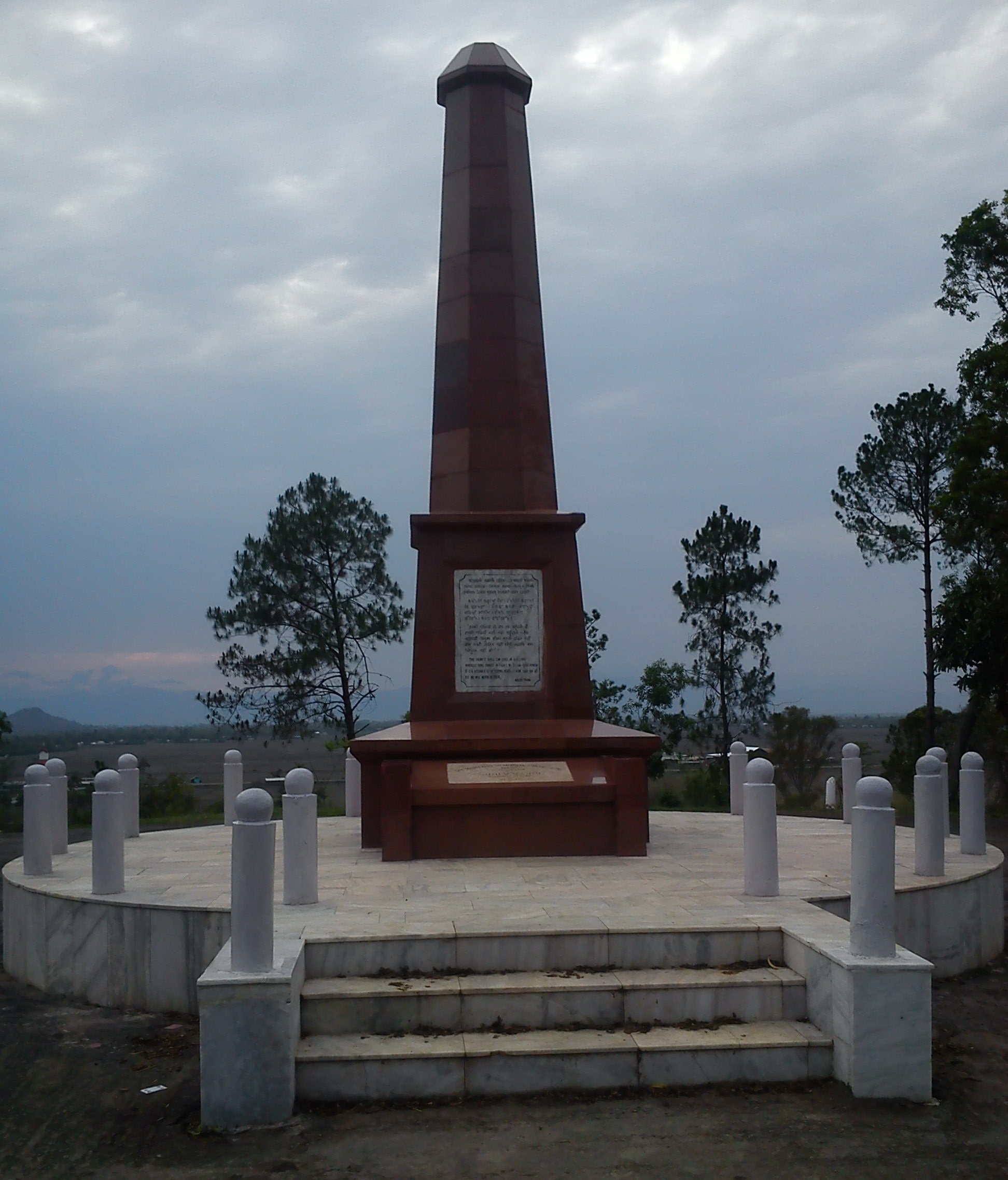
Old view of Khongjom War memorial complex, Thoubal district, Manipur

== See also ==
- Maibam Lokpa Ching
