= List of State Protected Monuments in Manipur =

This is a list of State Protected Monuments as officially reported by and available through the website of the Archaeological Survey of India in the Indian state Manipur. The monument identifier is a combination of the abbreviation of the subdivision of the list (state, ASI circle) and the numbering as published on the website of the ASI. 49 State Protected Monuments have been recognized by the ASI in Manipur. Besides the State Protected Monuments, also the Monuments of National Importance in this state might be relevant.

== List of state protected monuments ==
SL. No.	Description	Location	Address	District	Coordinates	Image
S-MN-1	Chothe Thangwai Pakhangba	Bishnupur		Bishnupur		Upload Photo
S-MN-2	Shrine of Lord Wangbrel(Wangpurel)	Chandel		Chandel		Upload Photo
S-MN-3	Pond of Lord Wangbrel	Chandel		Chandel		Upload Photo
S-MN-4	Boulder of Lord Wangbrel(Wangpurel)	Chandel		Chandel		Upload Photo
S-MN-5	Megalithic Site	Chandel		Chandel		Upload Photo
S-MN-6	Chibu Stone Inscriptions	Churachandpur		Churachandpur		Upload Photo
S-MN-7	Sekta-Kei Mound	Imphal East		Imphal East		Upload Photo
S-MN-8	Sacred Fire Place	Imphal East		Imphal East		Upload Photo
S-MN-9	Temple of Shri Krishna	Imphal East		Imphal East		Upload Photo
S-MN-10	Temple of Thangal General	Imphal East		Imphal East		Upload Photo
S-MN-11	Andro Inscription	Imphal East		Imphal East		Upload Photo
S-MN-12	Temple of Madan Mohanji	Imphal East		Imphal East		Upload Photo
S-MN-13	Khurai Ahongpund	Imphal East		Imphal East		Upload Photo
S-MN-14	Temple of Radha Damodar	Imphal East		Imphal East		Upload Photo
S-MN-15	Dolai Thaba Chingu Khubam	Imphal East		Imphal East		Upload Photo
S-MN-16	Kangla Fort (Including Quarter Moat & Kekrupat	Imphal West		Imphal West		Kangla Fort (Including Quarter Moat & Kekrupat
S-MN-17	Temple of Leimapokpa Keirungba	Imphal West		Imphal West		Upload Photo
S-MN-18	Temple of Sanamahi	Imphal West		Imphal West		Temple of Sanamahi
S-MN-19	Samadhi of Maharaja Khaba	Imphal West		Imphal West		Upload Photo
S-MN-20	Samadhi of Maharaja Gambhir Singh	Imphal West		Imphal West		Samadhi of Maharaja Gambhir Singh
S-MN-21	A Menhir	Imphal West		Imphal West		Upload Photo
S-MN-22	Inscribed Stone Monuments	Imphal West		Imphal West		Upload Photo
S-MN-23	Inscribed Stone Monuments	Imphal West		Imphal West		Upload Photo
S-MN-24	Rash Mandal Pukhri	Imphal West		Imphal West		Upload Photo
S-MN-25	Gateway &Brick Wall (in ruins) Apanbi & Haomacha Pukhri	Imphal West		Imphal West		Upload Photo
S-MN-26	A Hillock	Imphal West		Imphal West		Upload Photo
S-MN-27	Inscribed Stone of Maharaja Marjit	Imphal West		Imphal West		Upload Photo
S-MN-28	Thong Nambonbi (Humped Bridge)	Imphal West		Imphal West		Upload Photo
S-MN-29	Hicham Yaichampat (Cremation Ground of Bir Tikendrajit	Imphal West		Imphal West		Upload Photo
S-MN-30	Sangaiyumpham Maharaja Gambhir Singh	Imphal West		Imphal West		Upload Photo
S-MN-31	Wangthonbi Mound	Imphal West		Imphal West		Upload Photo
S-MN-32	Lainingthou Marjing	Imphal West		Imphal West		Upload Photo
S-MN-33	Makoinungol Ching	Imphal West		Imphal West		Upload Photo
S-MN-34	Lainingthou Sanamahi	Imphal West		Imphal West		Upload Photo
S-MN-35	Khagemba Leikol	Imphal West		Imphal West		Upload Photo
S-MN-36	Megalithic Monument	Senapati		Imphal West		Upload Photo
S-MN-37	Willong Megalithic Memorial Stones	Senapati		Imphal West		Upload Photo
S-MN-38	Pinoumai Tamartuo	Senapati		Imphal West		Upload Photo
S-MN-39	Lamtol (Khagemba Laikol)	Senapati		Imphal West		Upload Photo
S-MN-40	Sacred Jack Tree	Thoubal		Imphal West		Upload Photo
S-MN-41	Inscribed Stone of Maharaja Marjit	Thoubal		Thoubal		Upload Photo
S-MN-42	Inscribed Stone of Maharaja Garibniwaj	Thoubal		Thoubal		Upload Photo
S-MN-43	Megalithic Monument (A Menhir)	Thoubal		Thoubal		Upload Photo
S-MN-44	Megalithic Monument (A Menhir)	Thoubal		Thoubal		Upload Photo
S-MN-45	Krishna Avatar (Carved Stone)	Thoubal		Thoubal		Upload Photo
S-MN-46	Inscribed Stone Monument	Thoubal		Thoubal		Upload Photo
S-MN-47	Khongjom Battle Field (Tengol Lampak)	Thoubal		Thoubal		Upload Photo
S-MN-48	Historical Site of Wangkhei Meiraba	Thoubal		Thoubal		Upload Photo
S-MN-49	Lungpha (Archaeological Site)	Ukhrul		Ukhrul		Upload Photo

== See also ==
- List of State Protected Monuments in India for other State Protected Monuments in India
- List of Monuments of National Importance in Manipur
