= Baruni Hill =

Sacred Mountain in Manipur, India

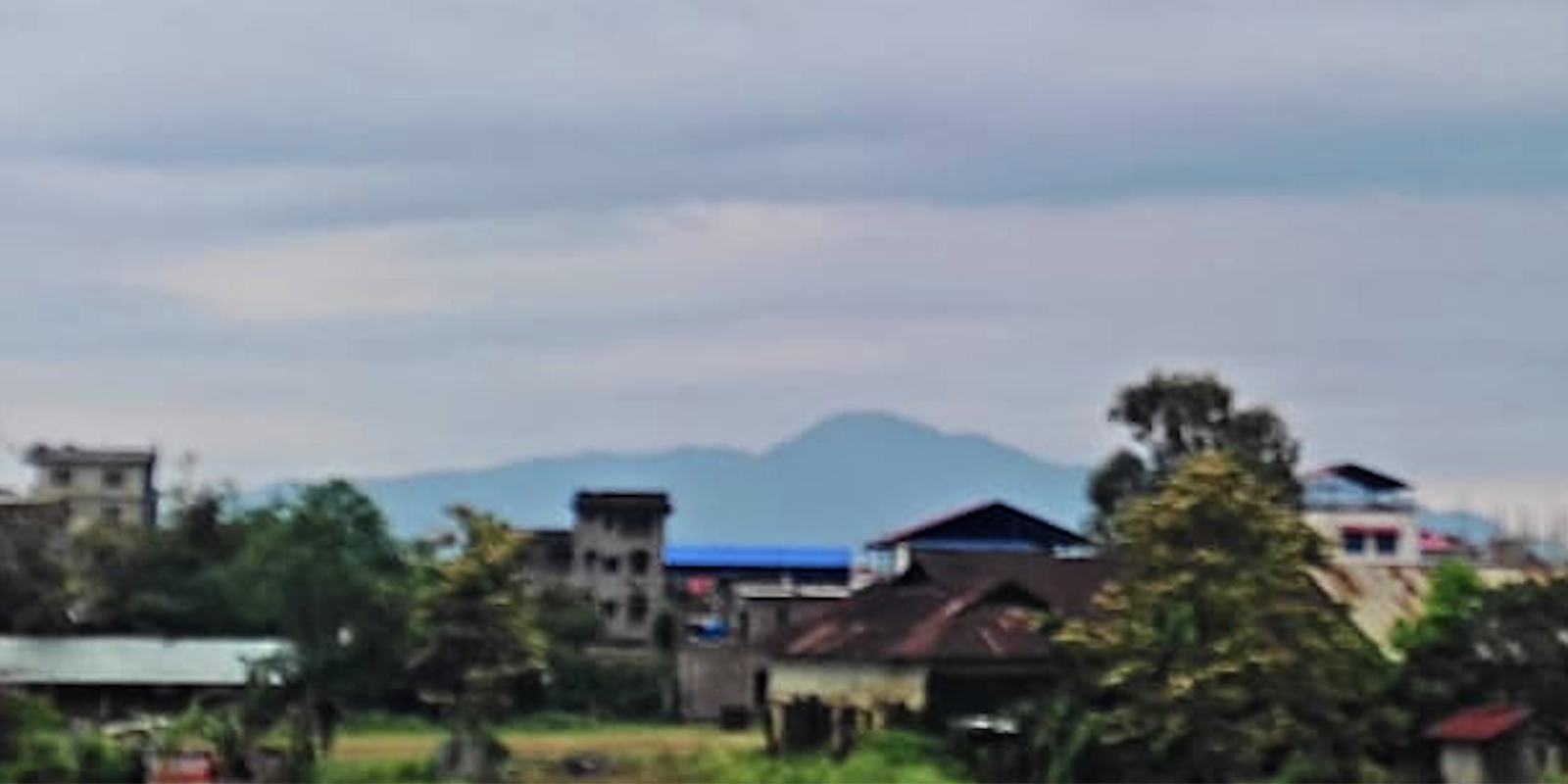
Baruni Hill

Baruni Hill is a small hill in the Himalayan state of Manipur and the abode of God Nongpok Ningthou.
