= Manipur Baptist Convention =

Baptist Christian denomination in Manipur, India

- Classification: Christianity
- Orientation: Evangelicalism, Protestants
- Theology: Baptist
- Associations: 31
- Headquarters: MBC Christian Centre, Manipur, NE India
- Founder: American Baptist Foreign Mission Society
- Origin: 1928; 98 years ago
- Congregations: 1,564 Churches
- Members: 240,754
- Official website: www.thembc.in

Manipur Baptist Convention (MBC) is a Baptist Christian denomination in Manipur, India. It is affiliated with the Council of Baptist Churches in Northeast India and the Asia Pacific Baptist Federation (Baptist World Alliance). The General Secretary of the Manipur Baptist Convention is Jolly Rimai.

== History ==
Baptist history in Manipur began in February 1894 when Scottish missionary William Pettigrew of the American Baptist Mission arrived in the state. He baptized 12 Tangkhul Naga men in 1901 and established the first church in Manipur in 1902—the Phungyo Baptist Church in Ukhrul.

Pettigrew initially arrived in the region to evangelize the Meitei people. However, due to strong local opposition, he shifted his focus to the hill tribes of Manipur. Following these initial baptisms of Tangkhul Nagas, Angom Porom Singh was baptized on 5 April 1903, becoming the first Meitei convert to Christianity.

The first Baptist church in Manipur was established in Ukhrul in 1902 known as the Phungyo Baptist Church. It is widely recognized and historically referred to as the "Mother Church of Manipur."

With the establishment of more churches, the need for fellowship and uniformity became apparent. Thus, thirteen delegates from five churches in Manipur gathered at Ukhrul in November 1916 and formed the first association, called the Manipur Christian Association (MCA).

However, due to the rapid expansion of Christianity across various tribes and geographical areas, the association required a more comprehensive organizational structure. Therefore, in 1928, the MCA was reorganized into a convention, officially named the Manipur Baptist Convention (MBC). Since then, the MBC has served as the main umbrella organization, with headquarters in Imphal.

== Statistics ==
According to a census published by the association in 2023, it claimed 221,436 members and 1,503 churches.

The statistics for the MBC is given below with the number of churches and number of Baptized Church members only as on 2011.

Children and non Baptized family members are not included in the statistics.

Sl. No.	Association	Churches + Assn.	Members
1.	Aimol Baptist Association	15+4	2,160
2.	Anal Naga Baptist Association	52+8	6,995
3.	Chin Baptist Association	16	2,521
4	Chiru Rem B/Churches Association	12	5,162
5.	Chongthu Baptist Churches Association	61	6,110
6	Chothe Baptist Churches Association	11+2	1,300
7.	Gangte Baptist Association	14	721
8.	Gorkha B/Churches Association	25+5	860
9.	Inpui Naga Baptist Churches Association	22	3,617
10.	Kharam Baptist Churches Association	4+1	745
11.	Koireng Baptist Association	7	1,000
12	Komrem Baptist Churches Association	58+9	5,412
13.	Kuki Baptist Convention	314	34,952
14.	Lamkang Naga Baptist Association	23	3,593
15.	Liangmei Naga Baptist Association	78+10	13,010
16.	Mao Baptist Churches Association	40+5	10,020
17.	Maram Naga Baptist Association	19+1	4,514
18.	Maring Naga Baptist Association	58+10	6,648
19.	Meitei Baptist Association	40+45	1,785
20.	Monsang Naga Baptist Churches Association	5+4	1,190
21.	Moyon Naga Baptist Association	8+3	1,287
22.	Poumai Naga Baptist Association	63+21	26,000
23.	Rongmei Naga Baptist Association	202	28,501
24.	Sadar Baptist Association	20+3	2,470
25.	Simte Baptist Churches Association	4	370
26.	Southern Tangkhul Naga Baptist Association	84+3	15,265
27.	Tangkhul Baptist Churches Association	100	48,050
28.	Tarao Baptist Association	4+1	465
29.	Thadou Baptist Association	57	5,365
30.	Thangal Naga Baptist Association	11+3	2,074
31.	Vaiphei Baptist Churches Association	1+2	400
	Total	1,428+135	2,42,562
