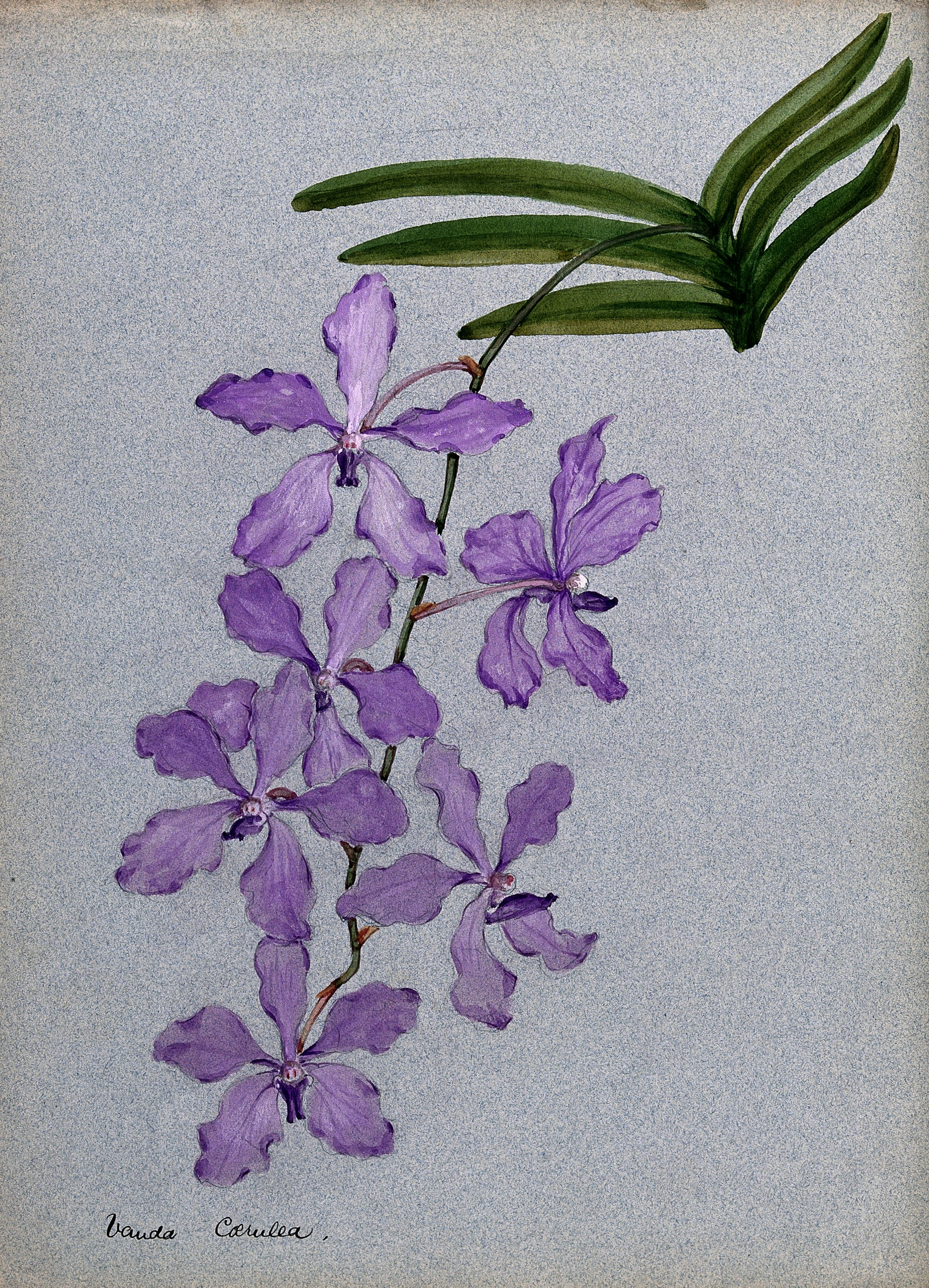

Scientific classification
- Kingdom: Plantae
- Clade: Tracheophytes
- Clade: Angiosperms
- Clade: Monocots
- Order: Asparagales
- Family: Orchidaceae
- Subfamily: Epidendroideae
- Genus: Vanda
- Species: V. coerulea

Binomial name
- Vanda coerulea Griff. ex Lindl.

Synonyms
- Vanda coerulea f. rogersii; Vanda coerulea var. rogersii; Vanda coerulea f. luwangalba; Vanda coerulea f. delicata; Vanda coerulea delicata

= Vanda coerulea =

Blue vanda

Species of orchid

Vanda coerulea, commonly known as blue orchid, blue vanda or autumn lady's tresses, is a species of orchid found in Northeast India with its range extending to China (southern Yunnan). It is known as kwaklei in Manipuri and vandaar in Sanskrit. It has bluish purple flowers which are very long-lasting compared to other orchids. The plant bears up to 20 to 30 spikes.

== Taxonomy ==
The plant was first formally first described by John Lindley in 1847 from the description provided by William Griffith. The latter had obtained the specimen from the Khasi Hills, and named it. He then sent the dried specimens to London.

Botanical drawings of Blue Vanda
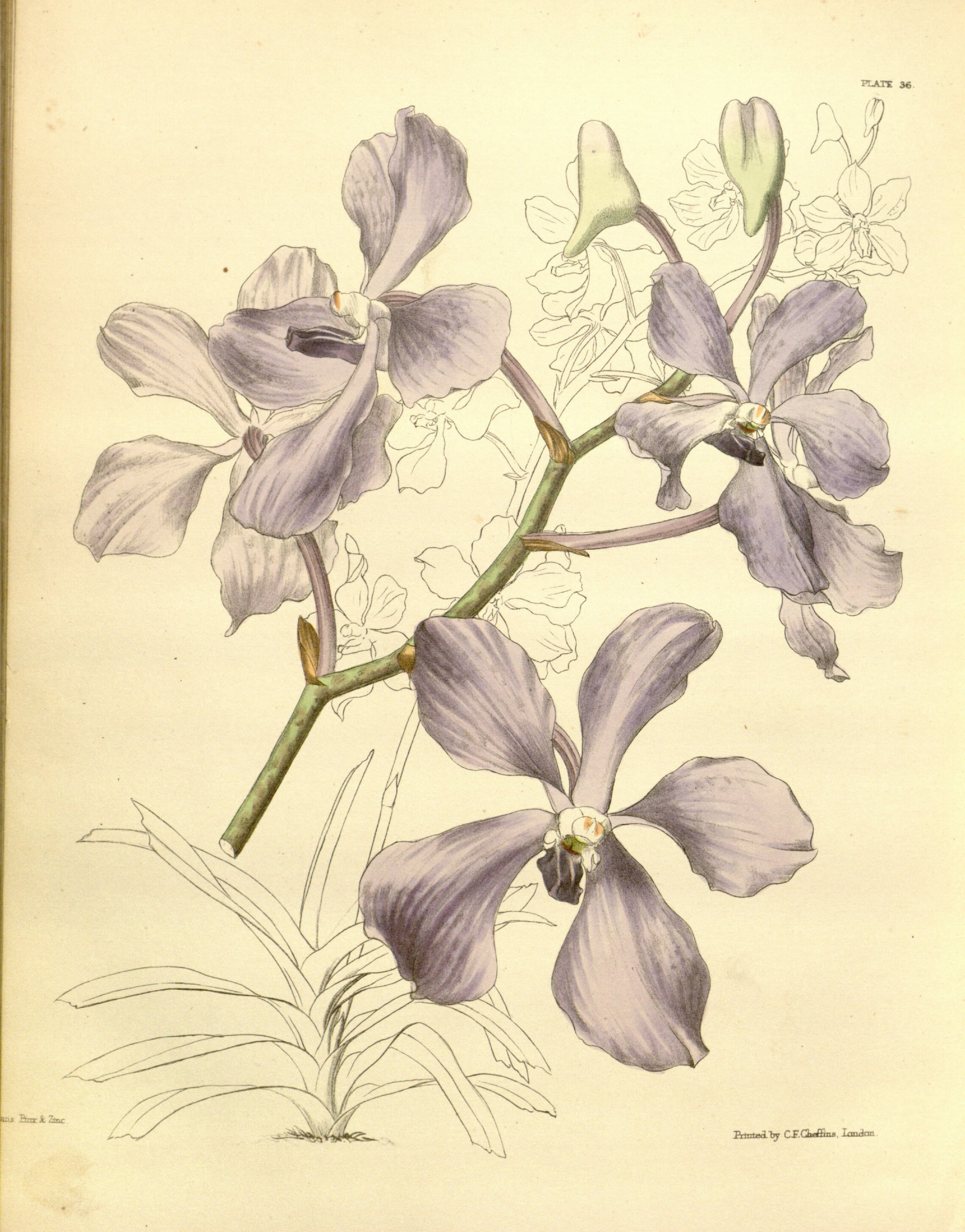
L. A. L. Constans (1853)

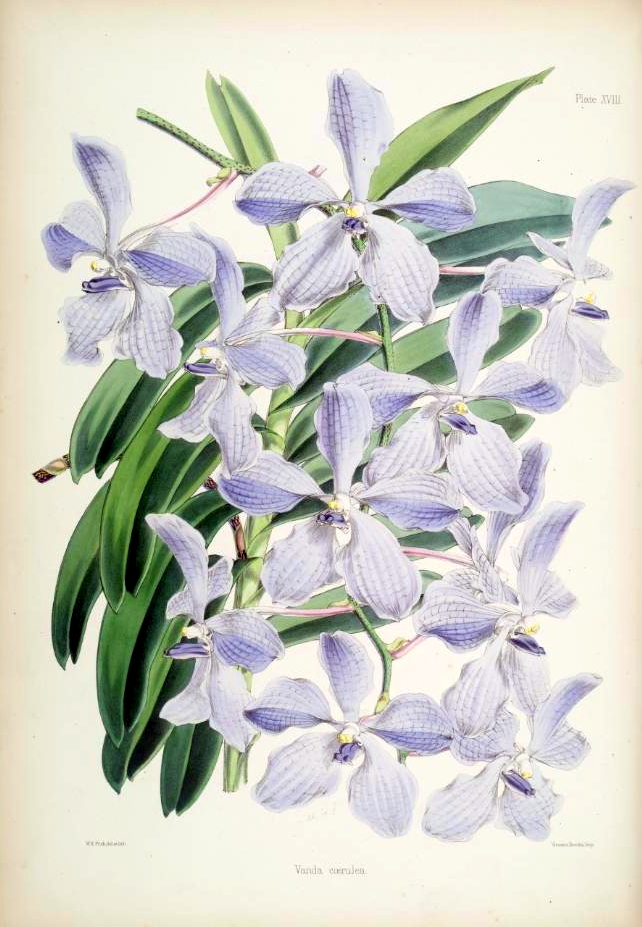
James Andrews (1860s)

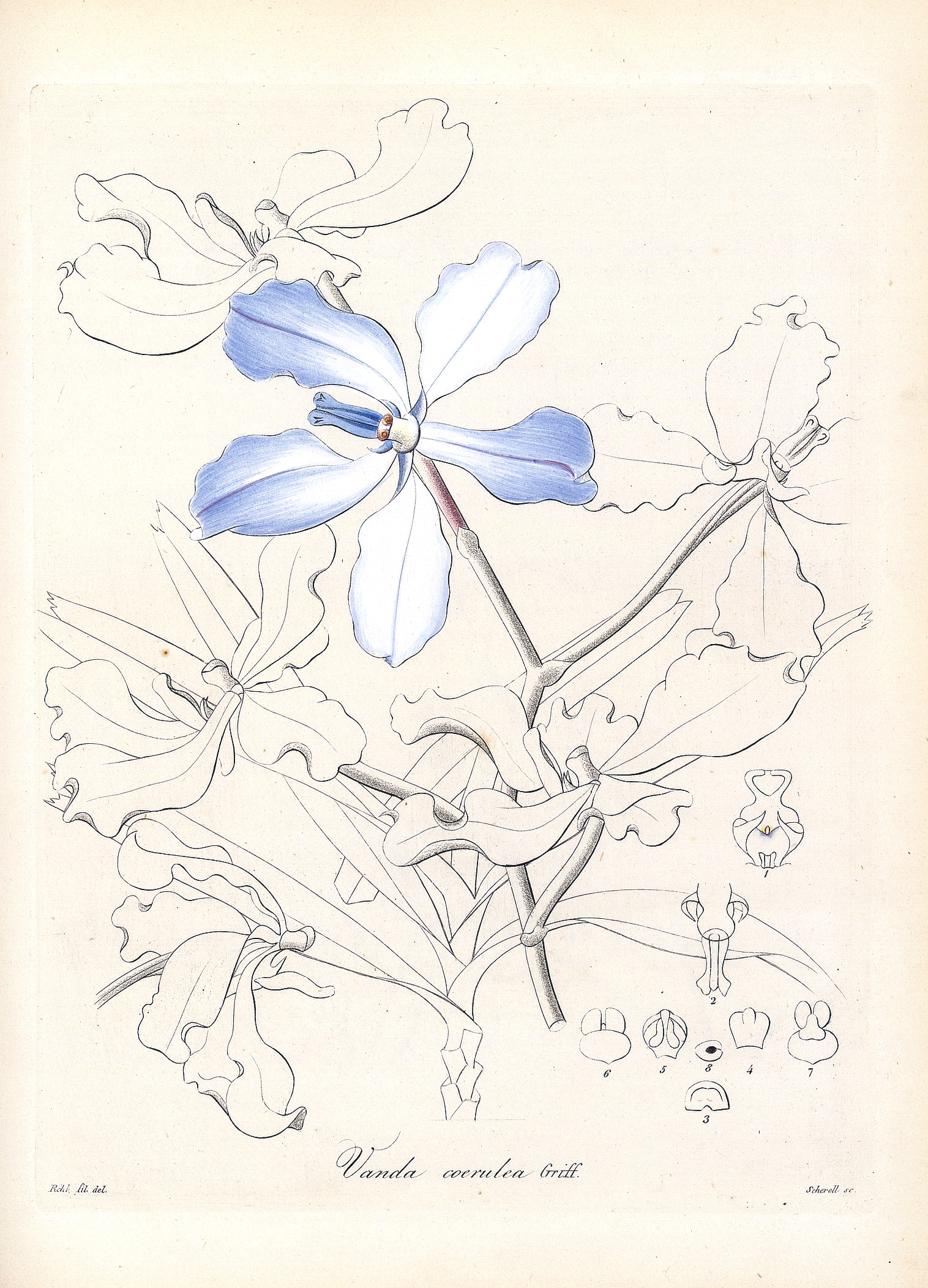
Heinrich Gustav Reichenbach (1858)

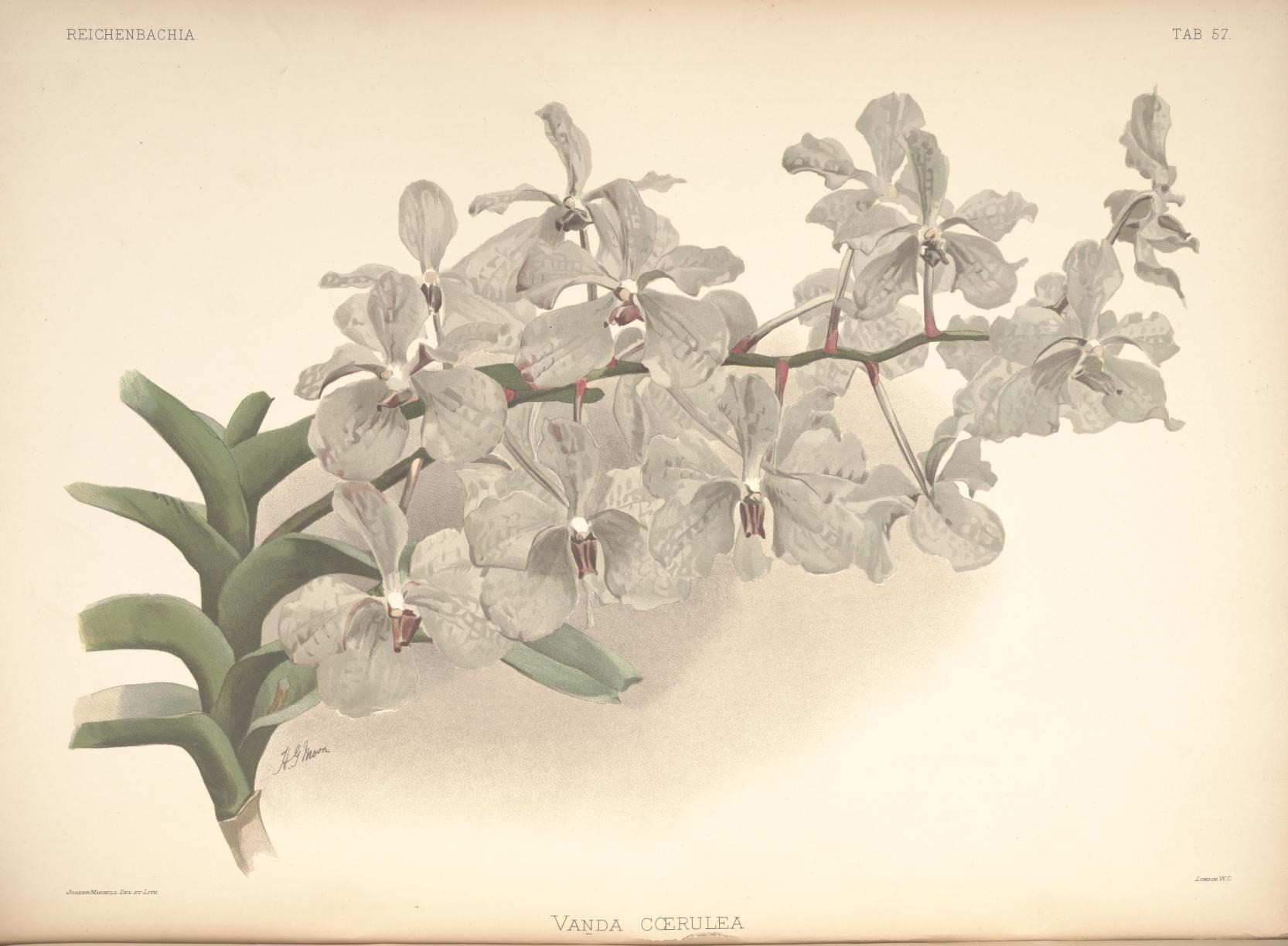
Henry George Moon (1893)

The heterotypic synonyms are,

- Vanda coerulea f. delicata
- Vanda coerulea delicata
- Vanda coerulea var. grandiflora
- Vanda coerulea var. hennisiana
- Vanda coerulea f. luwangalba
- Vanda coerulea f. rogersii
- Vanda coerulea var. rogersii

Vanda coerulescens Lindl. is a similar but separate species of dwarf form in plant and flowers.

== Distribution and habitat ==
Previously, it was thought to have been found only in the Khasi Hills. Here it seemed was threatened as it was over-collected due to its ornamental nature, and local charcoal production from oak trees on which they usually grow. Therefore it was placed in the CITES Appendix I in the 1970s.

Blue Vanda in the native range
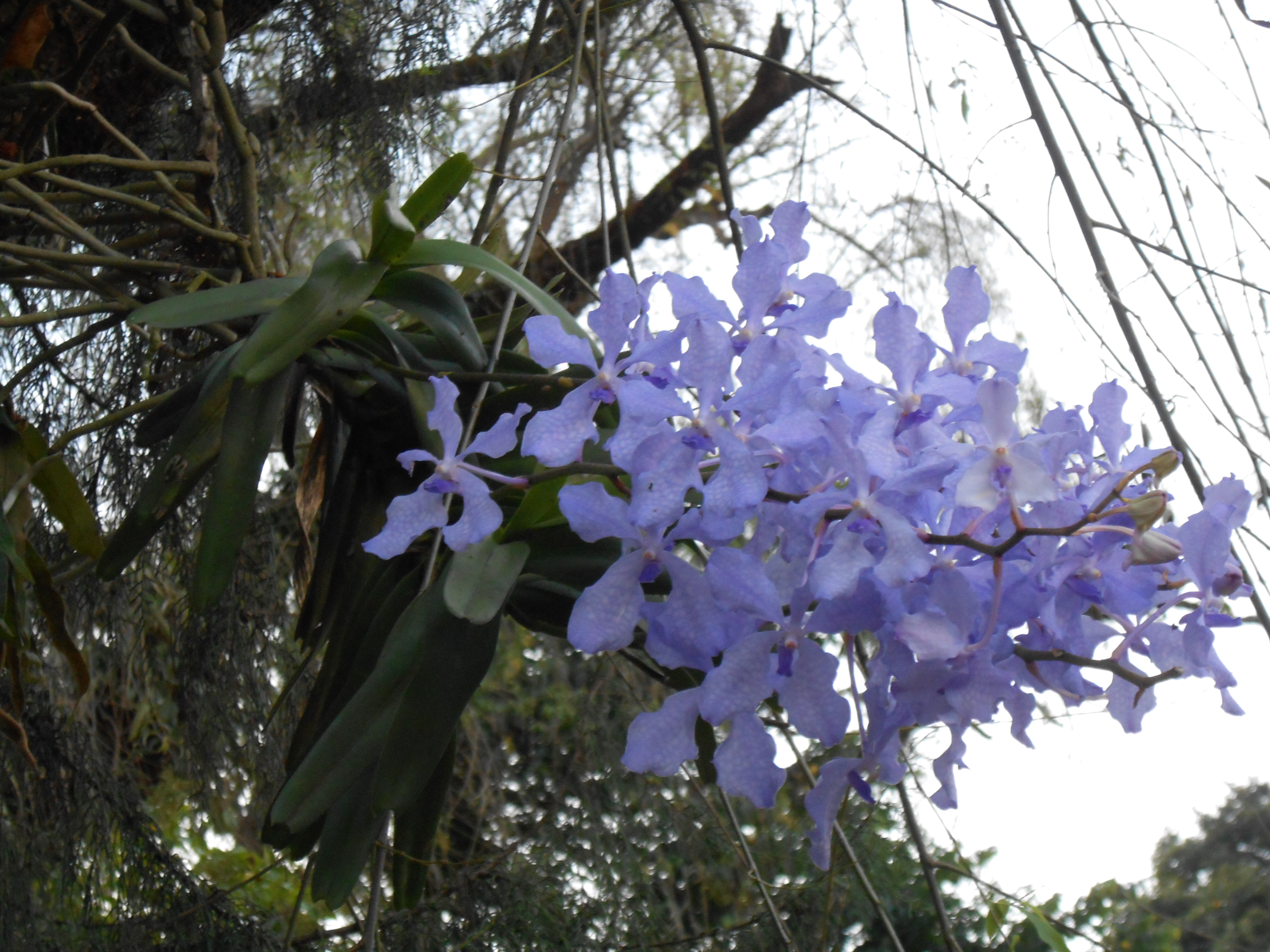
In Sohra, Khasi Hills

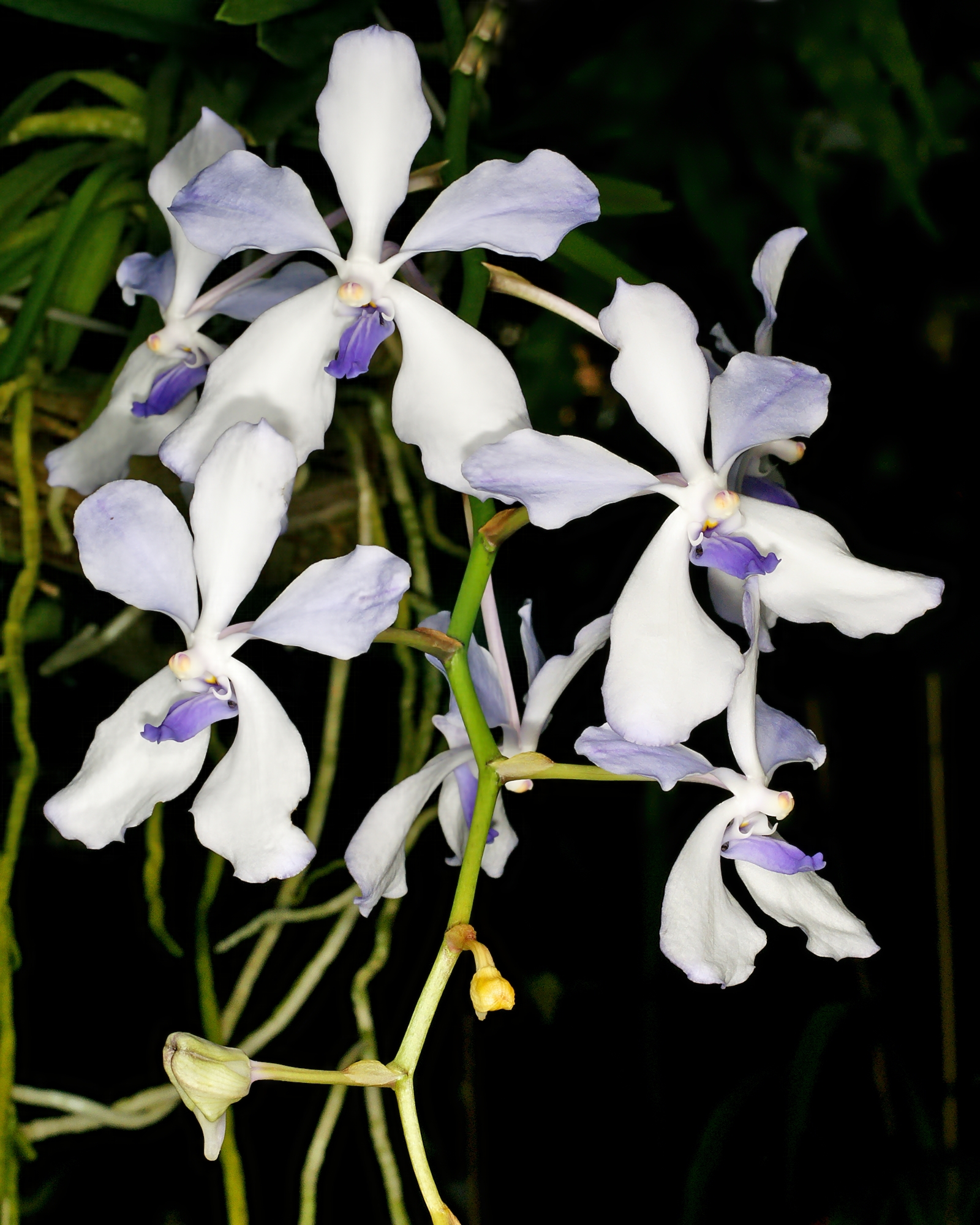
In Khasi Hills

In Meghalaya

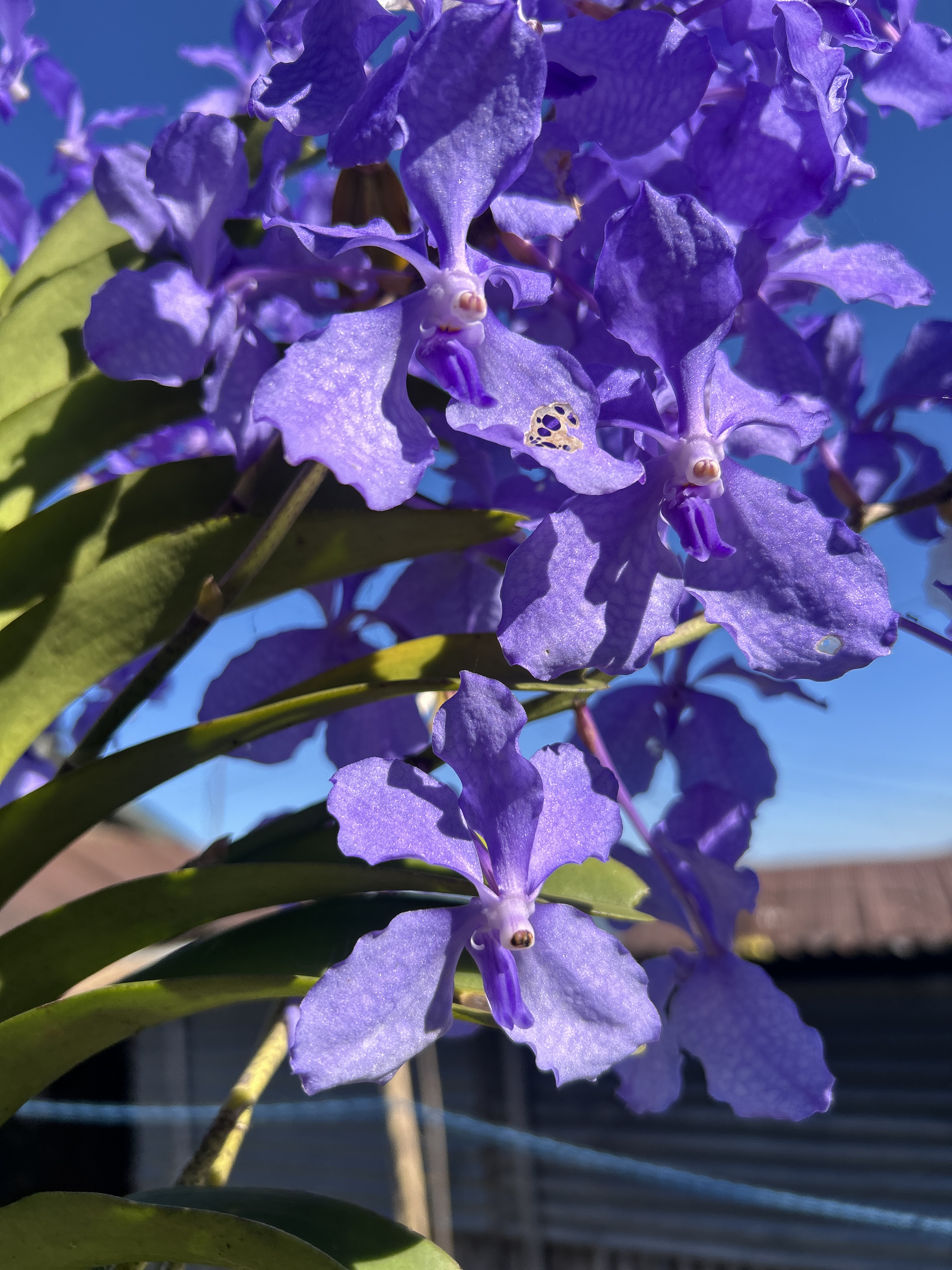
In Nagaland

== Medicinal uses ==
The flower's juice is used as eye drops against glaucoma, cataract and blindness. Active ingredients of Vanda coerulea may fight against the visible signs of ageing skin.

== In popular culture ==
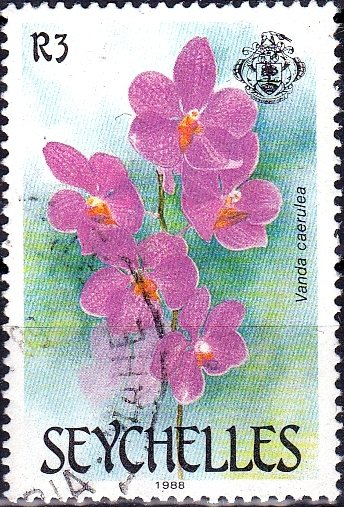
Seychelles stamp of Blue Vanda (1988)

In 1988 Seychelles released a stamp featuring the flower.
