= Kaina (Manipur) =

Coordinates: 24.673°N 94.015°E

Kaina is a small hillock located in the Indian state Manipur, that is sacred to Hindus. It lies on the Imphal – Yariripok road, about 29 kilometres (18 mi) from the state capital, Imphal. It is said to be the place where King Bhagya Chandra received an epiphany to carve a statue of Lord Govinda from a sacred jackfruit tree.

In 2014, the government of Manipur announced intentions to initiate a project to convert the place to a Mega Tourist Spot.

== See also ==
- Sacred Jackfruit Tree, Kaina
