= Pumlenpat =

Pumlenpat lake
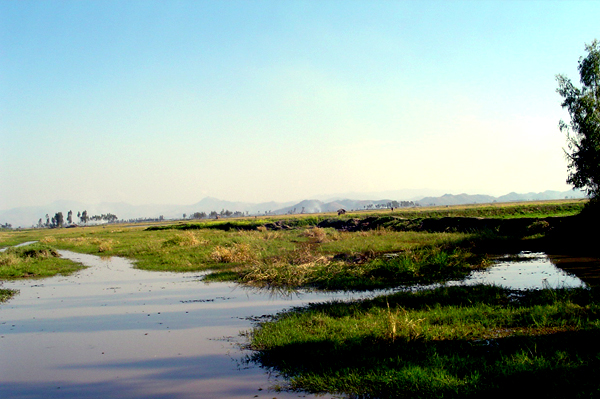
- Pumlenpat lake

- Location within Manipur
- Interactive map of Pumlenpat lake
- Location: Manipur
- Coordinates: 24.42°N 93.87°E
- Type: Freshwater lake
- Primary inflows: Thoubal River
- Primary outflows: Through barrage for hydro power generation, irrigation and water supply
- Basin countries: India
- Islands: small phumdis

Pumlenpat is the second largest lake in Manipur after the Loktak Lake, situated about 68 kilometres (42 mi) south of Imphal (the capital of Manipur, a state in North East India) and about 45 kilometres (28 mi) from Thoubal. Just as Loktak Lake, the people situated around this lake depend on fishery products for their livelihood. The lake plays an important role in the lives of the population of the towns nearby. There are plenty of small islands on this lake; people started settling on these islands, and the lake is now on the verge of extinction due to human encroachment.

== Barrages ==
Ithai barrage or dam, one of the important dams related to the Loktak Lift Irrigation is situated at southwest corner of this lake.

== Extinction ==
Pumlen lake or Pumlenpat is on the verge of extinction due to human settlement and encroachments in and around this lake. The floating planktons, or phumdi as it is called locally, is one of the important source of fishery products as waterbodies and the fishes can easily get adapted to this place for food and shelter.

== See also ==
- Ikop Pat
- Loktak lake
