= List of Monuments of National Importance in Manipur =

This is a list of Monuments of National Importance (ASI) as officially recognized by and available through the website of the Archaeological Survey of India in the Indian state Manipur. The monument identifier is a combination of the abbreviation of the subdivision of the list (state, ASI circle) and the numbering as published on the website of the ASI. 1 Monument of National Importance have been recognized by the ASI in Manipur.

SL. No.	Description	Location	Address	District	Coordinates	Image
N-MN-1	Temple of Vishnu	Bishenpur		Bishnupur	24°37′13″N 93°45′35″E	Temple of Vishnu More images

== See also ==
- List of Monuments of National Importance in India for other Monuments of National Importance in India
- List of State Protected Monuments in Manipur
