= Phungyo Baptist Church =

Coordinates: 25.111°N 94.360°E

- Phungyo Baptist Church
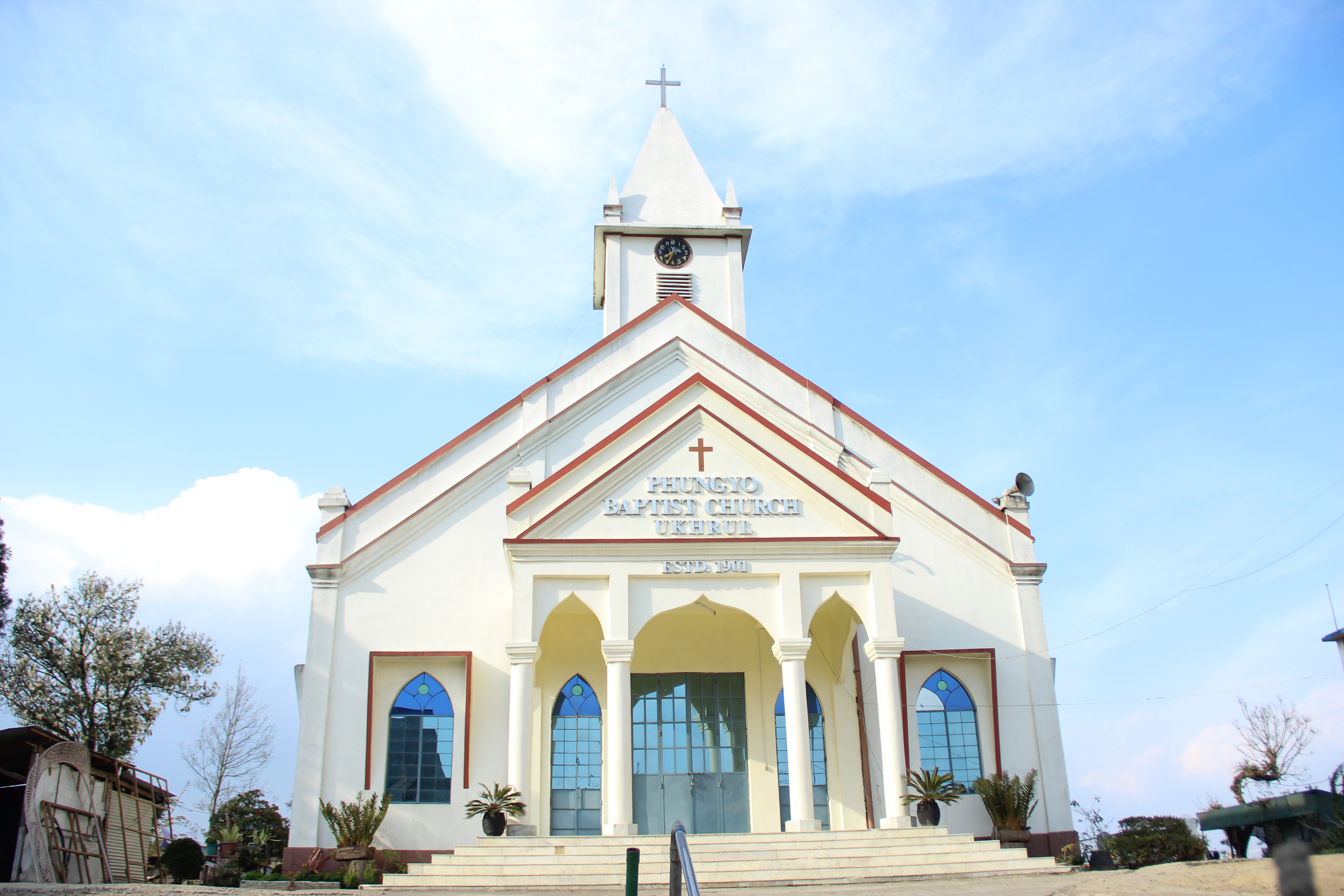
- Phungyo Baptist Church, Ukhrul
- Phungyo Baptist Church
- Location: Ukhrul, Manipur
- Country: India
- Denomination: Baptist

History
- Founded: 7 February 1977; 49 years ago

Architecture
- Completed: 7 February 1977; 49 years ago

Phungyo Baptist Church is a Baptist Church in Ukhrul, Manipur, India. It was constructed and established, when Reverend William Pettigrew baptized and converted twelve Tangkhul Naga to Christian faith in 1901.

== History ==
"Phungyo", a term derived from "Beautiful Hill" was given by Reverend William Pettigrew, when Hunphun (Ukhrul headquarter) elders told Pettigrew that a beautiful mount or hill is known as Phungyo in Tangkhul-Naga dialect. The Church, Phungyo Baptist Church, is constructed on this hill; hence, the name. The first Christian Church in Manipur, the church trace its origin to 29 September 1901, when 12 Tangkhul men were converted to Christianity by Pettigrew. The birth of Christianity among the Tangkhuls is therefore associated with this conversion. Baptized at Ngayira Rakhong (Ngayira Spring Pond), the first converts include, Hollei Rumthao, Sangmayang Kashung, Ramkaiphang Samrar, Leishisan Shaiza, Maninglum Kashung, Mangaleng Shaiza, Sakhayang Awungashi Shimray, Shangam Kasar, Kaphungkui Chiphang, Haora Mahongnao, Mashokring Kasomhung, and Thiksha Shokchui Kapai. Women later followed the step, and ten of them converted to Christianity in 1910. Baptized by Pettigrew, they include, Sanamla Ragui, Mahongai Rumthao, Horngaila/ Harngaila Singnaisui, Lanotla Samrar, Charoni Ngakang, Ngalew Ngakang, Kasuni Ngakang, Shareila Muirung, Lasengla Kasomwoshi, and Mikngaola Shingnaisui. The first Phungyo Church that the converts attended were made of mud walls, and having left in ruins by Allied air raid in search of Japanese forces during the second World War, the present (standing) church was reconstructed, and inaugurated by Kanrei Shaiza on 7 February 1977.

== Spiritual Activities of Phungyo Baptist Church ==
Conversion to Christianity disallowed many of the customs and culture followed by the Tangkhuls as part of their traditions. According to Shaiza, these include "maintenance of mohawk hairstyle (Hao Kuiret), brewing and drinking rice beer (Khor), attending traditional educational schools (Longshim), and participating in the death ritual ceremony (Kathi Kasham)", making the Tangkhuls to forego these customs and culture. The Western Missionaries disallowing such customs and traditions made Phungyo Baptist Church to grow along the lines of Western-Christian norms. Spiritual growth was further received in 1923, when the Church experienced the outbreak and spread of revivalism through the work of Ruichumhao Rungsung, Ninghei Luikham, Miksha Kashung Shimray and Thisan Luikham. This spiritual growth was met with severe challenges, when L.L. Peters, the then SDO of Ukhrul District (1924) issued "Orders to stem out Christian religion in Ukhrul District". Some Christian Pioneers like Thisan Luikham and Amayar A. Shishak suffered severely under these orders. However, such orders only made the Tangkhuls to become stronger in faith, and multiply. The spread in faith culminated towards establishing Phungyo Christian Endeavour or CE (for Youth) by on 7 July 1910; and the Women Society of Phungyo Baptist Church on 31 August 1917. The Phungyo CE was renamed as Phungyo Baptist Youth Society in 1983.

== Recent Developments ==
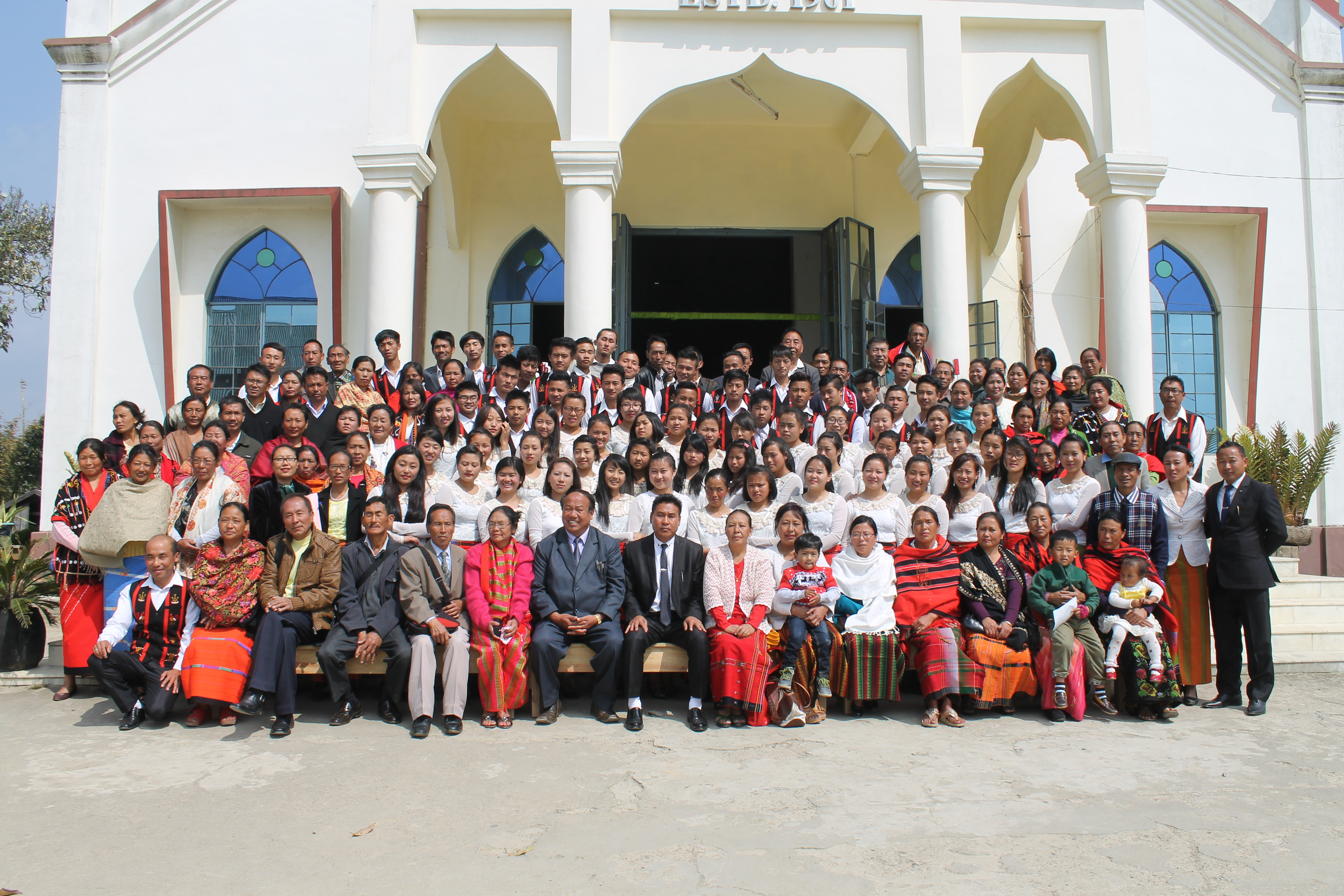
Phungyo Baptist Church Members, 2016

Although singspiration formed one of the most important form of worshiping among the Christian Tangkhuls, there was no organized Church Choir before 1952 at Phungyo Baptist Church. The CE later took the initiative of organizing a Church Choir, marking the birth with celebration at Pakahao Samrar's place (Alungtang Colony), on the second Sunday of March, 1953. Marking this Sunday as the 'Choir Raising Day', the second Sunday of March is observed as the birth day of the Church choir every year. The Church hosted the Tangkhul Baptist Long (TBL) Centenary from 7 March to 10 March 1996, to celebrate one hundred years of the Tangkhuls becoming Christians. The Phungyo Church centenary in the meantime was celebrated from 27 – 29 September 2002. Owing to the strong faith and the efforts of the Church, Tangkhuls have the Holy Bible and Christian Hymnals in their own dialect. The Holy Bible was published in the Tangkhul dialect by the Bible Society of India, and although it still requires revision on a wide scale, it serves as the basic and most vital book of the Tangkhuls and of the Church.
