= Samban-Lei Sekpil =

Sambal-Lei Sekpil is the world's tallest topiary. Created by Moirangthem Okendra Kumbi, it is modelled in the shape of a series of open umbrellas and spheres.

Okendra started mending the Sambal-Lei in 1983, originally planted by his sister in a small mustard oil can. Sambal-Lei is a flowering shrub use for fencing gardens in Manipur - Sambal means fencing and Lei means flower in Meitei language. Sekpil indicates the shape of the topiary and is derived from an ancient Meitei word for a decorative bamboo post with rounded structured cloths forming canopy in many stages. The sekpil, at present also called as "Shattra" is generally used in worship and festivals in Manipur.

== Facts at a glance ==
- Botanical name: Duranta repens L.
- Cultivar: 'Variegata'.
- Common name: Sky Flower.
- Hindi name: Nilkanta.
- Meitei name: Sambal-lei Mana Arangba.
- Planting year: 1981.
- Experiment started year: 1983.
- National record (Limca Book of Records): 18 November 1992 (at the height of 6 m (20 ft), with 11 steps).
- World record (Guinness Book of Records): 26 November 1999 (at the height of 15 m (50 ft), with 35 steps).
- Present height: 40 ft., as of March 2014.
- Topiary steps: 44.
