= Maramfest =

- Founder John Hingkung on stage at Maramfest 2009
- Genre: pop music, rock music, folk music, folk shows
- Location: Maram Centre
- Years active: 2009 to present
- Founders: John Hingkung and Paul Hongkung
- Website: Official Site

Maramfest is an annual music and cultural festival held in Manipur, founded by John Hingkung. It usually takes place in December/January. The festival is owned and managed by Sevendiary.com. In 2012, the line-up included two British Metal bands Bloodshot Dawn and Xerath headlining the festival.

== Maramfest 2009 ==
The first Maramfest was held on 16 January 2009 at Helipad Ground, Maram Centre. The line-up settled into a pattern of progressive rock, country and hard rock. Renowned local acts like Jiangam, Scarf, Psiikouna, Young Maraluiths and Over the Bridge performed in front of thousands of home fans.

== Maramfest 2012 ==
After a hiatus of two years, the 2nd Edition of Maramfest 2012 featured Bloodshot Dawn (UK), Xerath (UK) and Recycle (Imphal) on the festival bill, held at Mini Stadium, Senapati in Manipur.

== Official compilation albums ==
An official Maramfest compilation CD is released annually to coincide with the start of the festival. The compilation includes songs by numerous artists performing on the festival that year and also the best songs released by Maram artistes that year.

Year	Title
2006	Maramfest
2007	Maramfest
2009	Maramfest
