= Shirui National Park =

National park in Manipur, India

Coordinates: 24°13′51″N 94°13′51″E

- IUCN category II (national park)
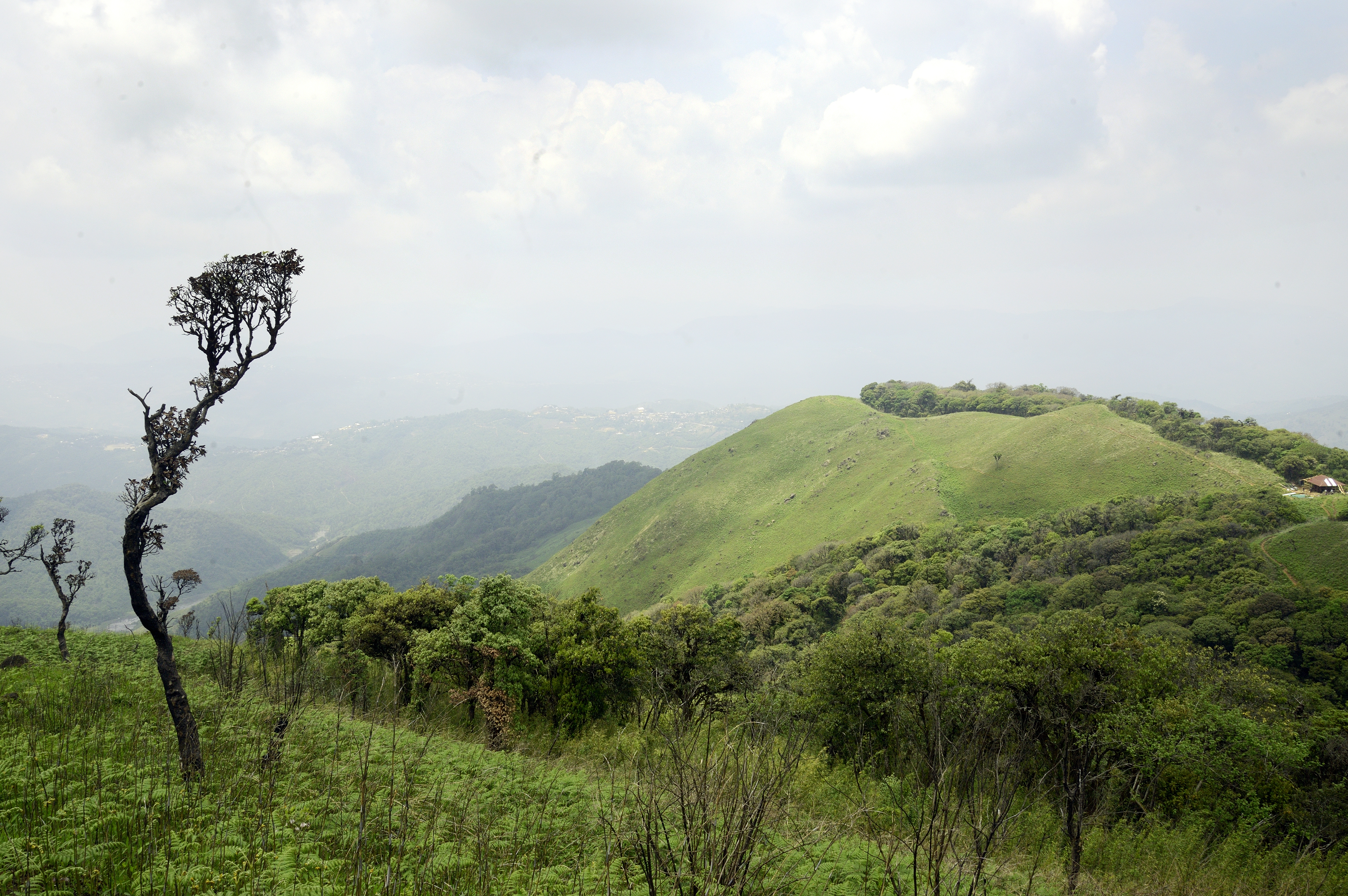
- A view from Shirui National Park
- Interactive map of Shirui National Park
- Location: Ukhrul, Manipur, India
- Area: 41.30
- Established: 1982; 44 years ago

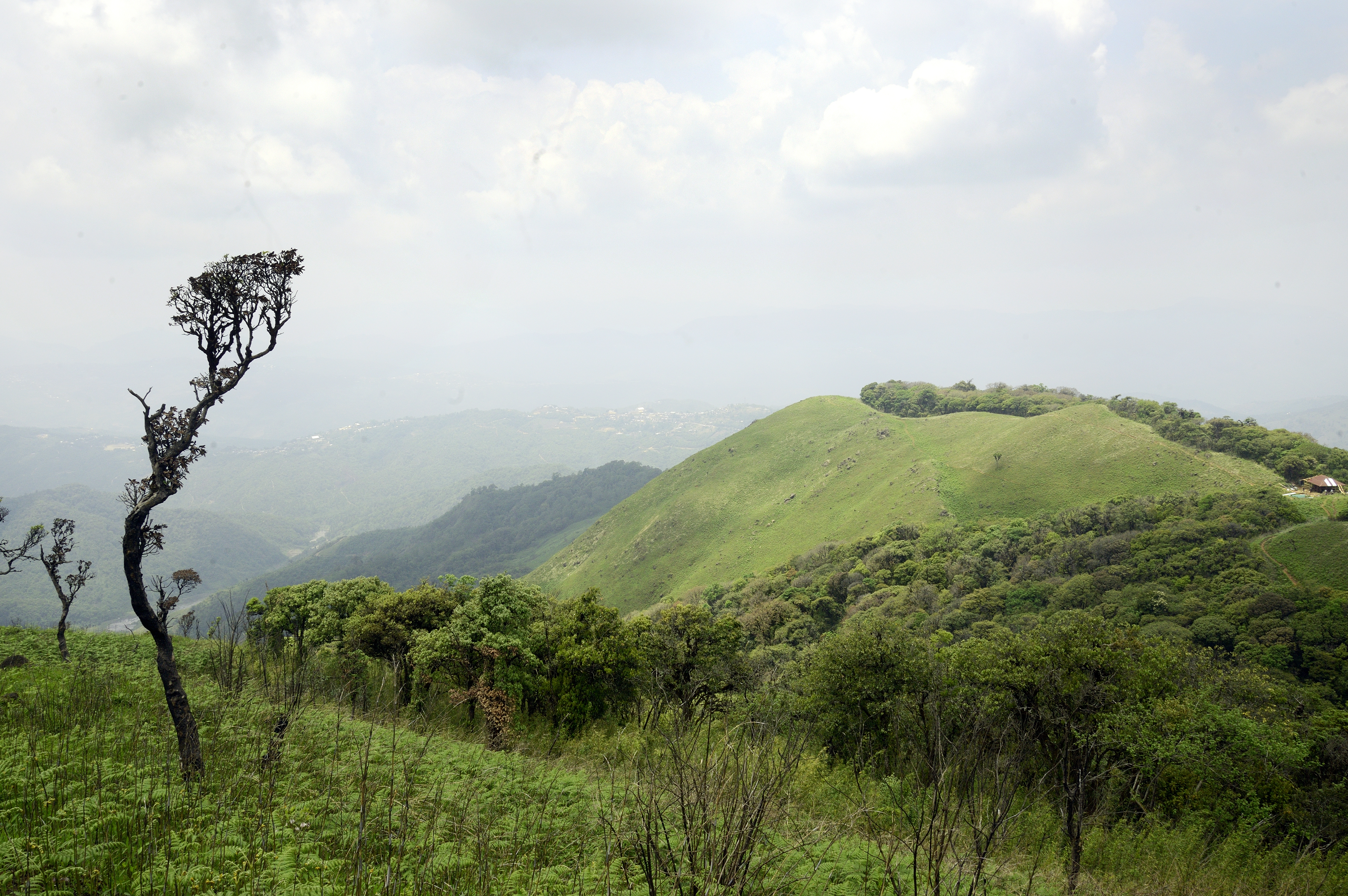
A view from Shirui National Park

Shirui National Park is a national park located in the state of Manipur in India. It was established in 1982. Among the animals that make their homes here include tragopan, tiger and leopard. It is here that the famous shirui lily (Lilium mackliniae) grows naturally.

The Shirui Kashong Peak in Ukhrul is a hill top view point located at a height of 2,835 meters above sea level. A number of rivers originate from this peak.

Rare birds like Blyth's Tragopan and Mrs. Hume's bar-backed pheasant inhabit the hill top.

In the park, natural life is supported by an undisturbed biological system.

== Flora ==
It has dense tropical forests all over and temperate forest in the hilltops.
