= William Pettigrew (missionary) =

British missionary (1869–1943)

The Reverend William Pettigrew
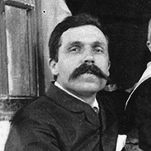
- Born: 5 January 1869; Edinburgh, Scotland
- Died: 10 April 1943; England
- Occupation: Christian missionary
- Spouses: Alice Goreham Pettigrew (m. 1896; died 1934); Ethel A. Masales (m. 1934)
- Children: Jessie Melbourn (born 1897); Douglas Colin (born 1898); Edward William (born 1902); Margaret Alice (born 1905)

William Pettigrew (5 January 1869 – 19 January 1943) was a British Christian missionary who went to India in 1890, eventually brought western education in Manipur and introducing Jesus Christ to the Tangkhul Naga tribe, inhabiting Ukhrul district and he became the main catalyst for the surge in current Christian population in Manipur.

== Personal life ==
William Pettigrew was born at Edinburgh on 5 January 1869. After his mother died at childbirth of his younger brother, his father who worked as captain in an Irish ship. remarried, and added two more brothers and one sister to the family. The Pettigrew siblings were brought up in strict Anglicanism, where the children attended Bible Camp every week. During one of such visits, Pettigrew heard about the first American missionary Adoniram Judson working as a Christian missionary in Burma (now Myanmar). Inspired by this story, Pettigrew was convinced that he would become a missionary and spread Christianity in India. To fulfil this desire, he underwent aboriginal training after completing high school at the Arthington Aborigines Mission training centre. He was certified to go to India as a Christian missionary on 28 November 1890, and arrived in India at Calcutta with three other missionaries and a doctor during the same year. Pettigrew later married his high school sweetheart Alice Goreham on 13 November 1896, at Calcutta, and they lived in India till 1933 before they departed for England.

== Missionary work in India ==
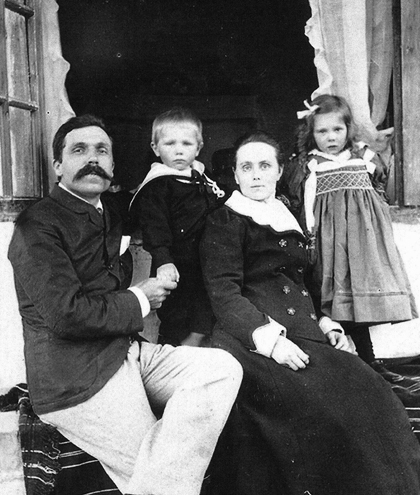
Pettigrew's family

From his arrival till 1894, Pettigrew worked with the Arthington Aborigines Missionary group, but from 1894, he started to work with the American Baptist Foreign Mission Society (ABFMS), after he converted from the Anglican to Baptist faith in India.

When he finally started working in Manipur, Pettigrew worked as a Baptist missionary. He was given approval by the political agent of Manipur, which was a princely state under the British Raj, to work as Christian missionary at Ukhrul, one of the hill regions of Manipur. The order from the political agent for Pettigrew to work among the head-hunting Tangkhul Naga tribe living at Ukhrul came in such manner: "Confined and restricted to one section of the country, the North-East area among the Tangkhul Nagas, Headhunters of the past and still practised in the outlying and frontier villages, the writer and his wife at their own risk according to Government order from 1896 to 1918 made the largest and most important village of the tribe Ukhrul, their headquarters". Pettigrew started his work as an educationist at the Ukhrul Headquarter, Hunphun, on 19 February 1897, when 20 students enrolled to learn rudimentary western education. He also learned the Tangkhul language from the Hunphun Chief Raihao Awungshi Shimray, which was followed by writing Tangkhul primers, arithmetic, and catechism in Roman script, and finally translating the English Bible into the Tangkhul language. The New Testament was published in the language in 1926. From Ukhrul Headquarter, Hunphun, education and schools swiftly spread to the surrounding villages including Humbum (Hungpung), Talla (Talloi), Faling (Halang), Paoyi (Peh), Chingjui (Chingjaroi), Phadang (Phalee), Somdal, Horton, Longpi (Nungbi), Khangkhui, and Nambisha. These villages with their schools were structured under a 'single teacher school' system. By 1897, the Manipur State Government also started to award the students with stipend scholarship of 3 Rupees, in order to encourage them into education.

Imparting western education was followed by converting 12 Tangkhuls from their primal religion of nature-worshiping to Christianity on 29 September 1901. This day is regarded as the day, Phungyo Baptist Church, the first church of Manipur, was born in the State. Thereafter, Christianity grew at a rapid rate, leading to the entire conversion of the Tangkhul Nagas into Christianity. Pettigrew returned to the United Kingdom in 1933, and lived out the rest of his life in England before his death in 1943.

== Other works and contributions ==
For his contribution towards spreading Western education and his service in the rural areas, the Imperial British India awarded him with the honour of Kaisar-I-Hind Medal. From 1917-1919, Pettigrew also enlisted 2,000 Manipur men into the Tangkhul Naga Labour Corps for service on the Western Front, serving as a captain in the corps. While working at Hunphun, Pettigrew was a member of the Honorary British Foreign Bible Society, the Asiatic Linguistic Society and the Manipur State Educational Standing Committee.
