= Dances of Manipur =

Dances performed in Manipur, India

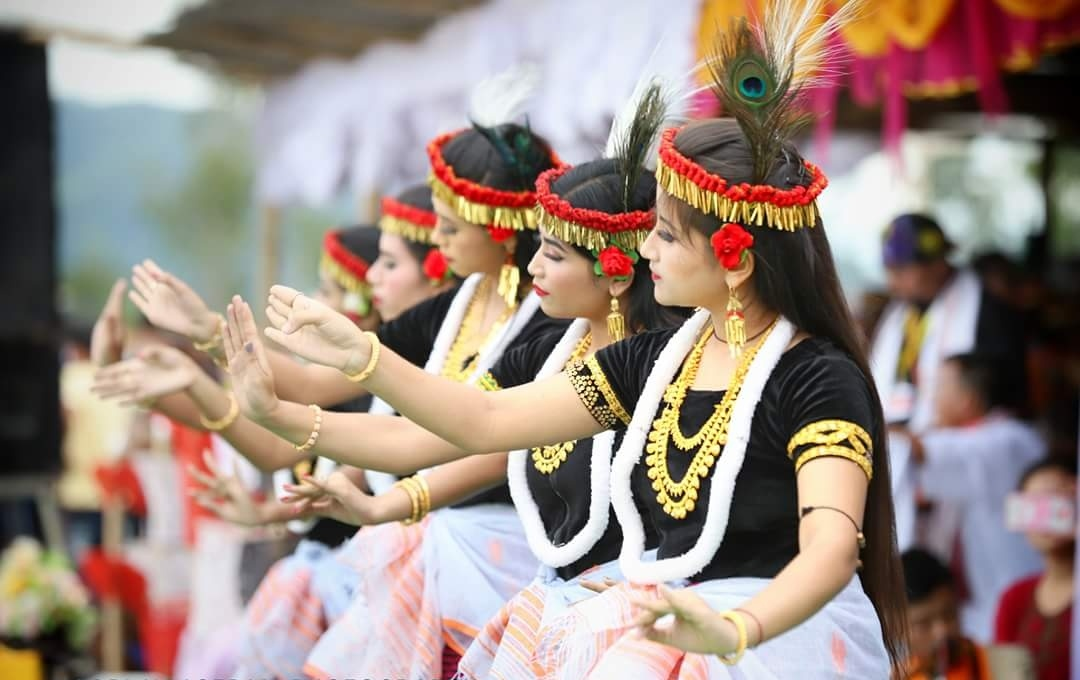
Leima Jagoi, a Manipuri folk dance

There are many different dance styles from Manipur, a state in northeastern India bordering with Myanmar (Burma), Assam, Nagaland and Mizoram. Manipuri dances encompasses both classical and folk dance forms. The Raas Leela is one of the major Indian classical dance forms. The folk dance forms are mainly attributed to ancient Meitei deities such as Umang Lai and performed during Lai Haraoba, and also the dances of the different tribal communities of Manipur.

The Manipuri dance, in general, is a team performance, with its own unique costumes, aesthetics, conventions and repertoire. Manipuri dance is a religious art and its aim is the expression of spiritual values. Aspects of this performance art is celebrated during festivals and major rites of passage such as weddings among the Manipuri people, particularly in the ethnic majority of Meitei people.

There are numerous dance forms of Manipur, comprising both classical and folk dances of the different communities residing in the state. Some of them are provided below.

== Raas Leela ==
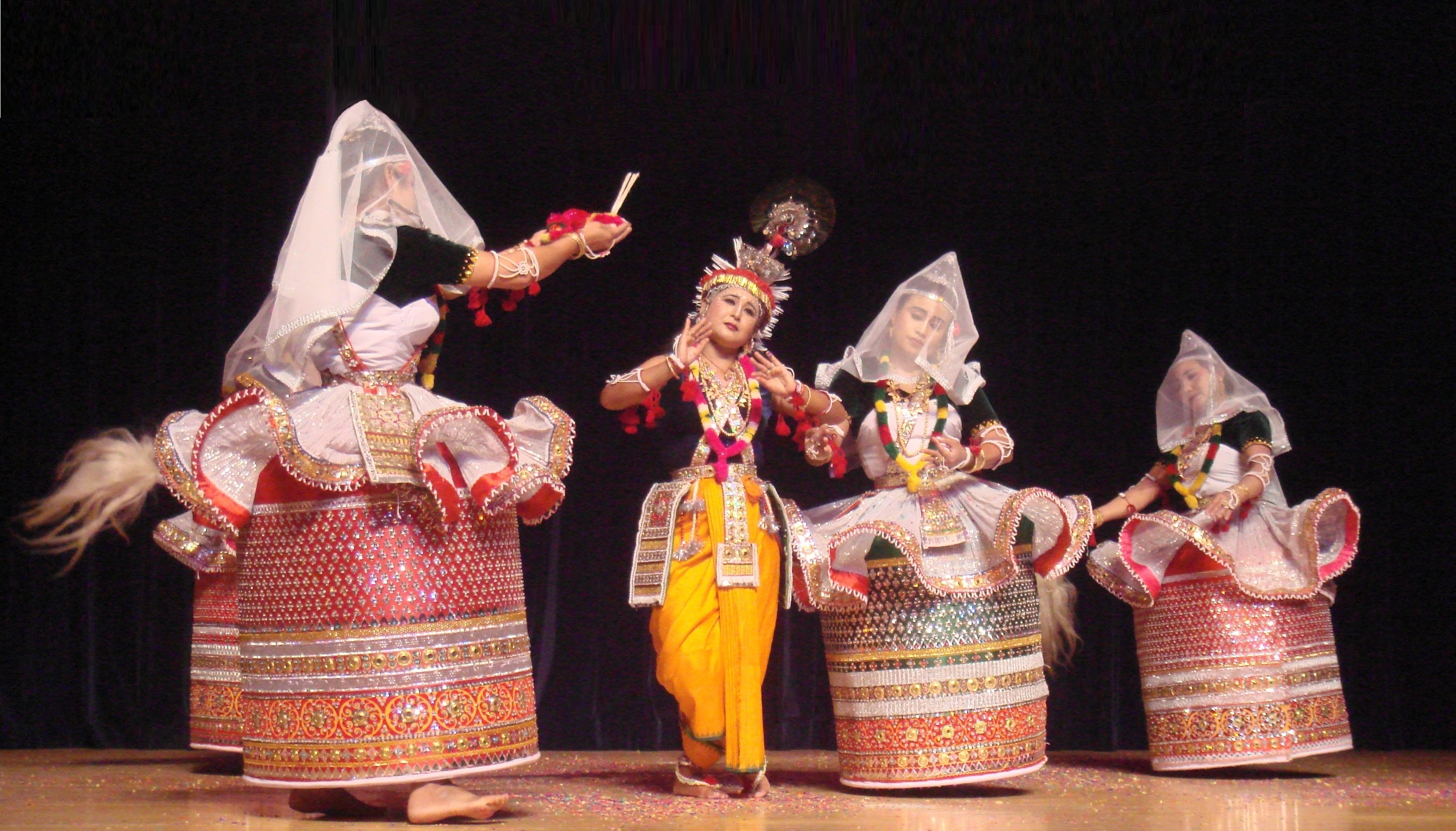
Raas Leela

The Raas Leela is based on Hindu Vaishnavism themes and exquisite performances of the love-inspired dance drama of Radha-Krishna called Raas Leela.

The roots of the Manipuri Raas Leela dance, as with all classical Indian dances, is the ancient Hindu Sanskrit text Natya Shastra, with influences and the cultural fusion between various local folk dance forms. With evidence of Vishnu temples in the medieval era, this dance form has been passed down verbally from generation to generation as an oral tradition. This Manipuri dance drama is, for the most part, marked by a performance that is graceful, fluid, and sinuous with greater emphasis on hand and upper body gestures. It is accompanied with devotional music created with many instruments, with the beat set by cymbals (kartal or manjira) and double-headed drum (pung or Manipuri mrdanga) of sankirtan. The dance drama choreography shares the plays and stories of Vaishnavite Padavalis, that also inspired the major Gaudiya Vaishnava-related performance arts found in Assam and West Bengal.

== Thougal Jagoi ==
Thougal Jagoi is the folk dance of the Meitei community performed during the Lai Haraoba festival before the deities. It is also known as Khamba Thoibi Jagoi. A variant of Thougal Jagoi, performed only by women dancers, is known as Leima Jagoi. The dance uses traditional musical instruments like pena and laangden (traditional drum). According to the legendary Meitei language epic poem of Khamba Thoibi set in the ancient kingdom of Moirang, it is believed that Khamba, the Khuman prince and Thoibi, the Moirang princess performed this dance in front of Eputhou Thangjing.

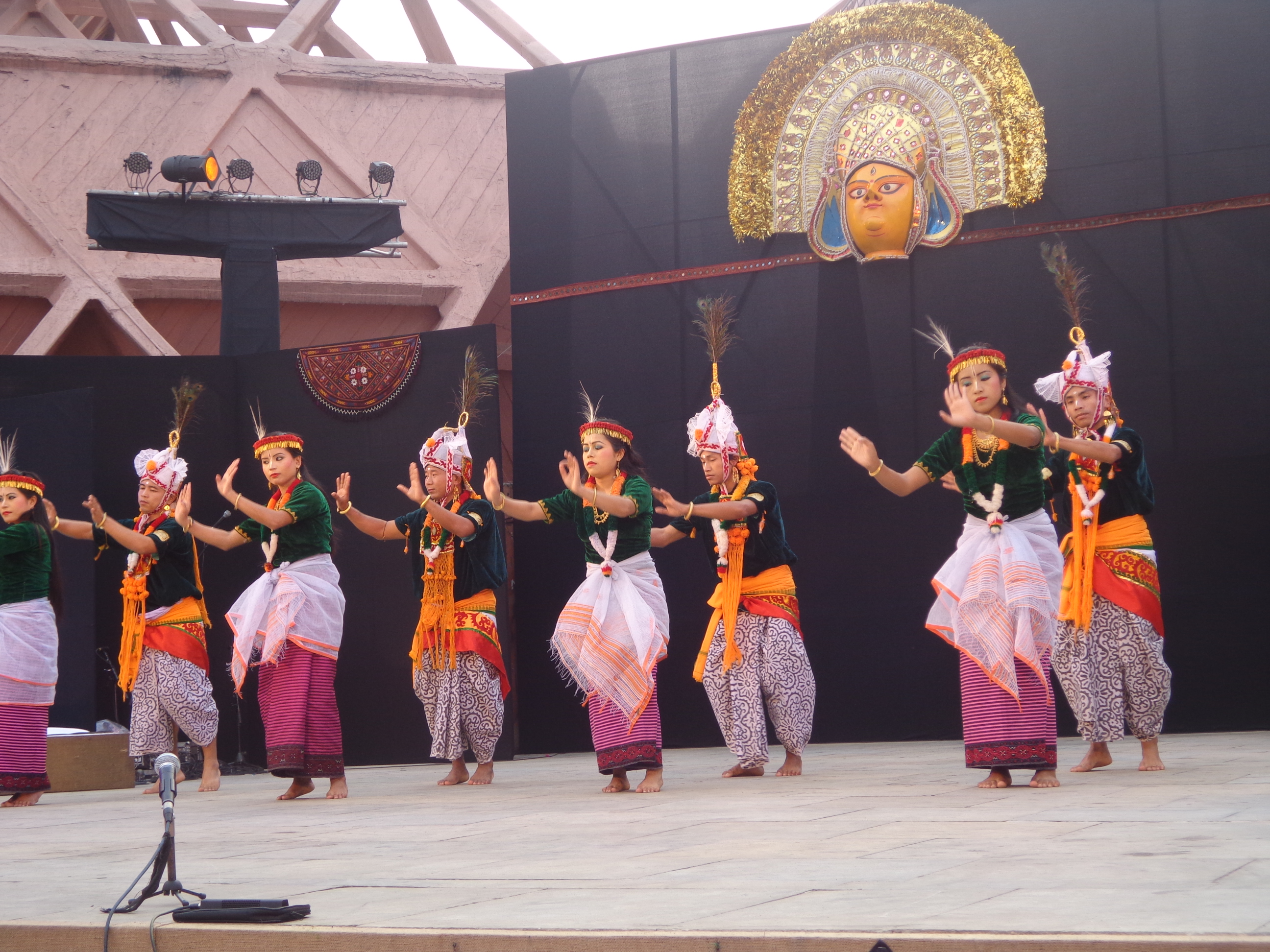
Thougal Jagoi/Khamba Thoibi Jagoi

== Yelhou Jagoi ==
Yelhou Jagoi includes all the dances performed during the Lai Haraoba festival, mainly by the Maibis. Some of them are Laiching Jagoi, Nungnao Jagoi, Panthoibi Jagoi, Longkhon Jagoi, Paton, Thang Thaba and Phibul Jagoi. Thougal Jagoi also comes under Yelhou Jagoi.

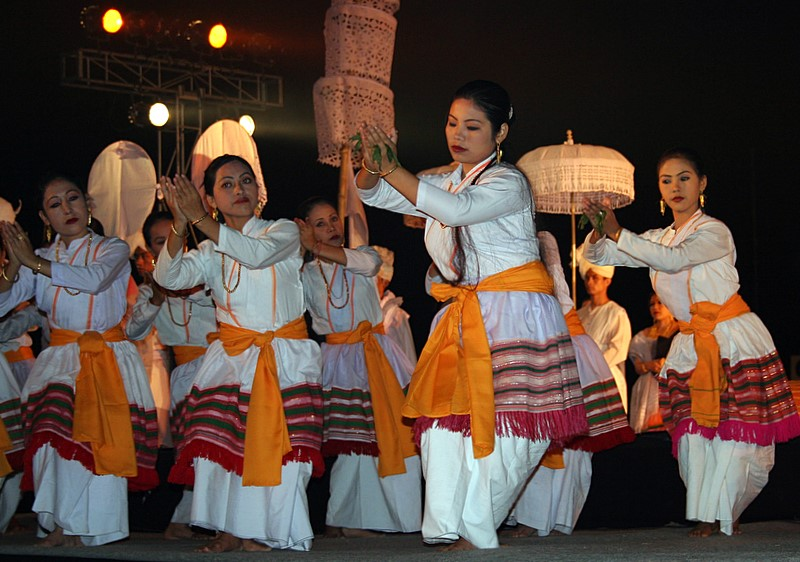
Laiching Jagoi, a ritualistic dance of the Lai Haraoba festival

== Luivat Pheizak ==
Luivat Pheizak is one of the most popular dances of the Tangkhul Naga community of Manipur. The dance depicts the different stages of cultivation and the simple lifestyle of the community. It is performed during all traditional festivals in the state.

== Thabal Chongba ==
Thabal Chongba (dancing by moonlight) is a Manipuri folk dance that is traditionally performed during the festival of Yaoshang in India. In the dance, participants join hands in a circle, hop on one foot and swing their free legs across, slowly advancing.

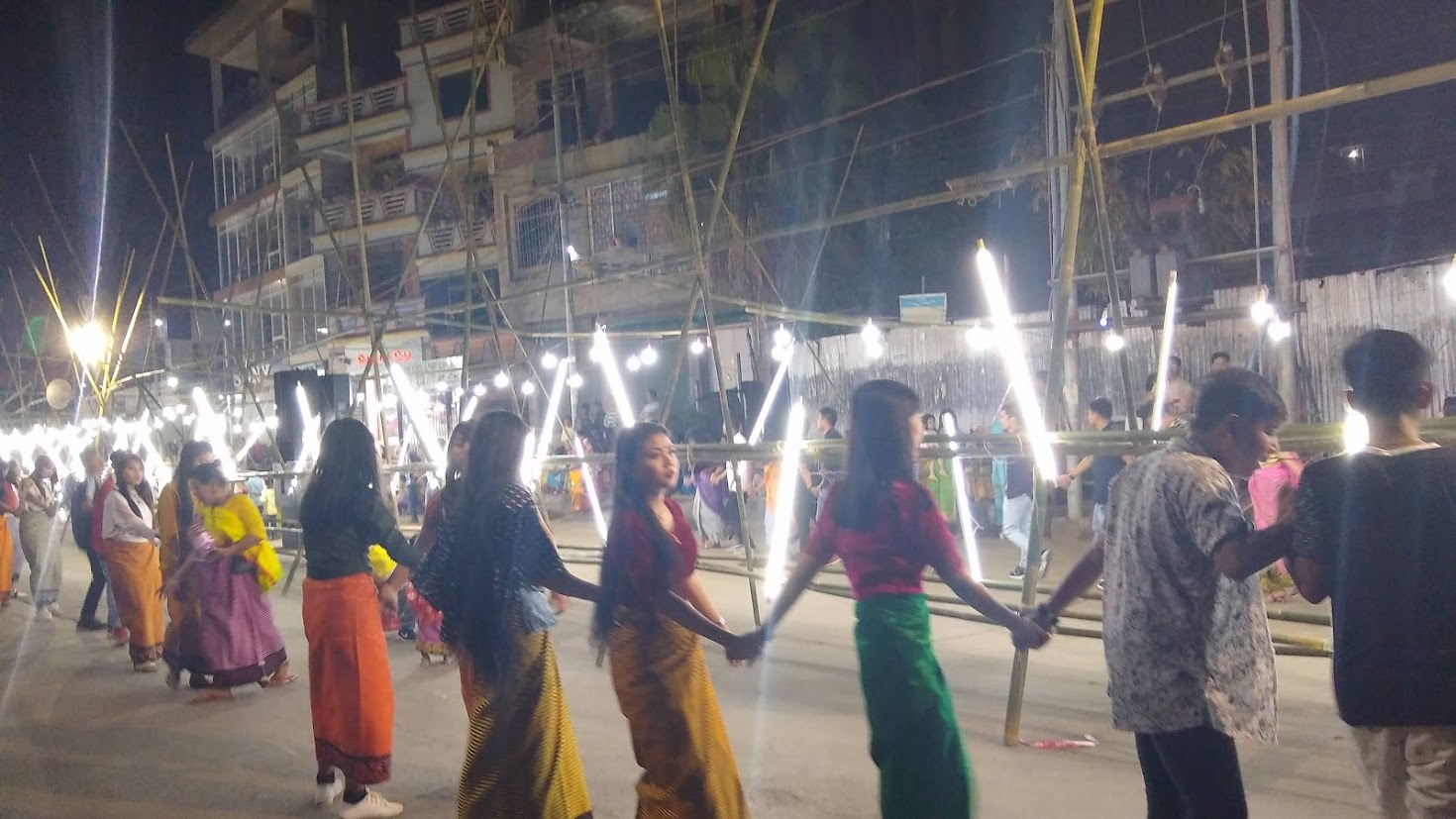
Thabal Chongba

== Dances of Kom Tribe ==
Reviving Lam, Salin Lam (Celebration of harvesting festival), Buntak Lam, Dar Lam (Bell dance), Waikep Lam (War dance), etc...
