= Sacred Jackfruit Tree =

Site of the Sacred Jackfruit Tree
- Location in Imphal East district, Manipur Sacred Jackfruit Tree (India)

Religion
- Affiliation: Hinduism
- District: Imphal East district
- Festival: Ras Lila at the mandapa at the temple complex at the site

Location
- Location: Kaina Hill or Bhashmukh Parbat on the Imphal – Yariripok road
- State: Manipur
- Country: India
- Interactive map of Site of the Sacred Jackfruit Tree
- Coordinates: 24.6476°N 94.07°E

Specifications
- Temple: 1
- Elevation: 921 m (3,022 ft)

The Sacred Jackfruit Tree is a historical site in the Indian state of Manipur where a jackfruit tree (Artocarpus heterophyllus) growing on the small hill of Kaina was used to carve images of Hindu god Krishna. Rajarshi Bhagya Chandra, earlier known as Shree Jai Singh Maharaja, the King of Manipur in the 18th century, had a dream in which he received instructions from Krishna to carve His images from this tree. Accordingly, seven images of Krishna were carved from the jackfruit tree and installed in various temples in Manipur and in the neighboring state of Assam. One such temple is the Shree Govindajee Temple at Imphal.

== Location ==
The Sacred Jackfruit Tree site is on the Kaina Hill, a small hillock in the southern part of a mountain range called Langmaijing, in the Imphal East district to the east of the Manipur valley. In the past, Kaina Hill was known as Lakhai Phandong Ching. It was a royal orchard of the palace. It is 29 kilometres (18 mi) from Imphal on the Imphal-Yariripok road. Kaina Mountain rises to a height of about 921 metres (3,022 ft). The location of the Theibong Jackfruit tree (Jackfruit in Meitei language means Theibong) is a religious and historical site for the Meitei Hindus who have named it as Bhashmukh Parbat.

== Legend ==
According to Meitei mythology, Bhagya Chandra, the King of Manipur was commanded by the Hindu god Krishna in a dream to carve His images from a particular jackfruit tree in Kaina.

In 1765 Chandra was defeated by King Alaungpaya of Konbaung Burma (now Myanmar), and as a result he escaped to Cachar in Assam and took asylum with King Swagadeva Rajeshwer Singh of Tekhau. However, Chandra's uncle, who had plotted with the Burmese king to oust him from Manipur, complained to Rajeshwer Singh that Chandra was an "impostor". The Assamese king became suspicious and ordered that Chandra should fight a rogue elephant to prove his bravery and innocence.

As King Chandra was a highly religious person, dedicated to the worship of Krishna, he appealed for help. Acceding to Chandra's prayers, Krishna appeared to him in a vision the night before the fight with the elephant. He told the king to face the elephant in front of a jackfruit tree in which he would be present, holding a rosary of Tulsi. Krishna commanded that after the fight he should carve images of His out of that particular jackfruit tree, and to deify and worship them in temples built for the purpose.

The next day when the encounter took place in front of the jackfruit tree in Kaina, the wild elephant, instead of attacking Bhagya Chandra, bowed before him with reverence. After this, the king of Assam decided to help Bhagya Chandra. With his help, Chandra led an army to Manipur and won back his kingdom.

== Carvings ==
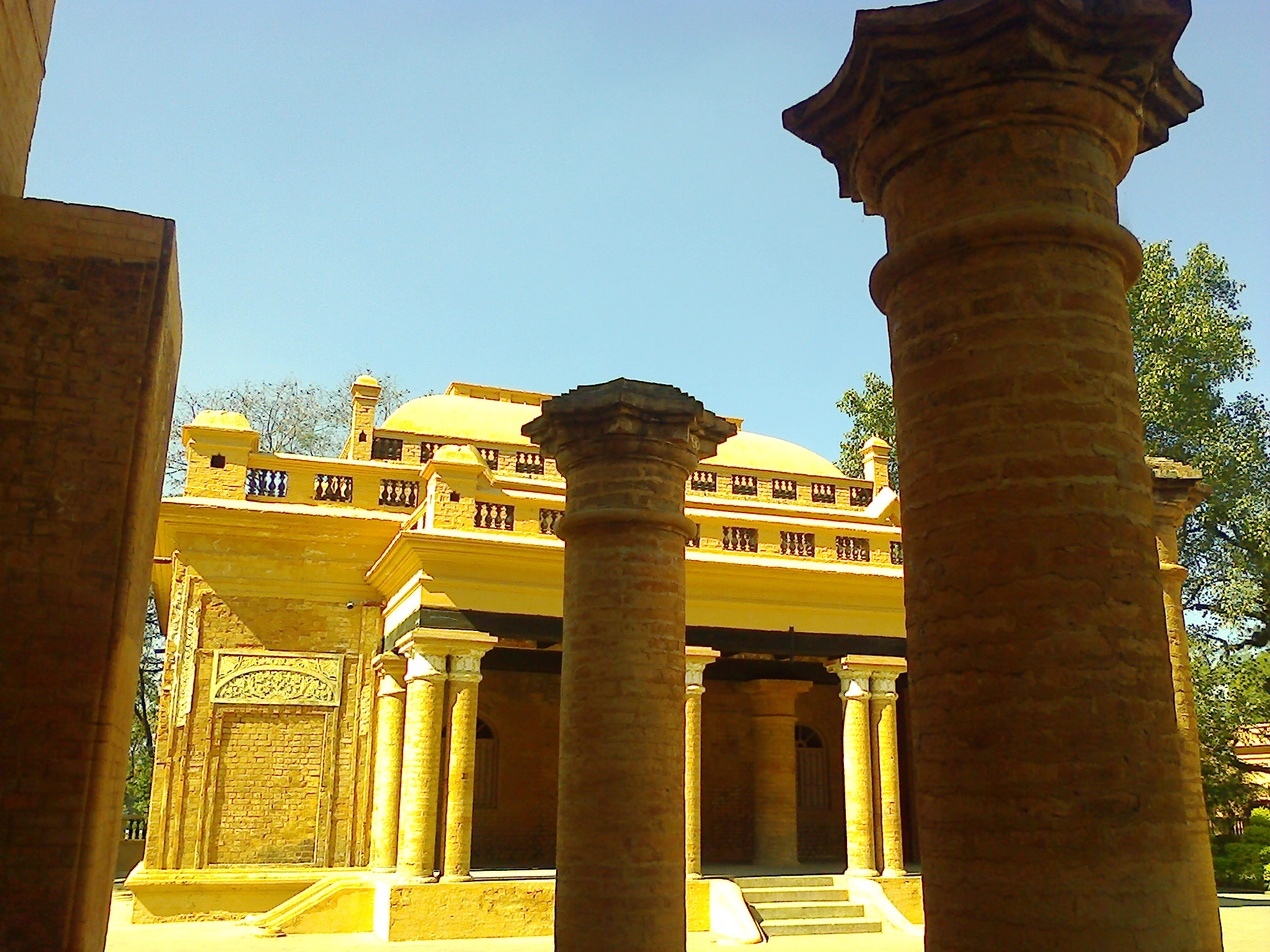
Shree Govindajee Temple in Imphal

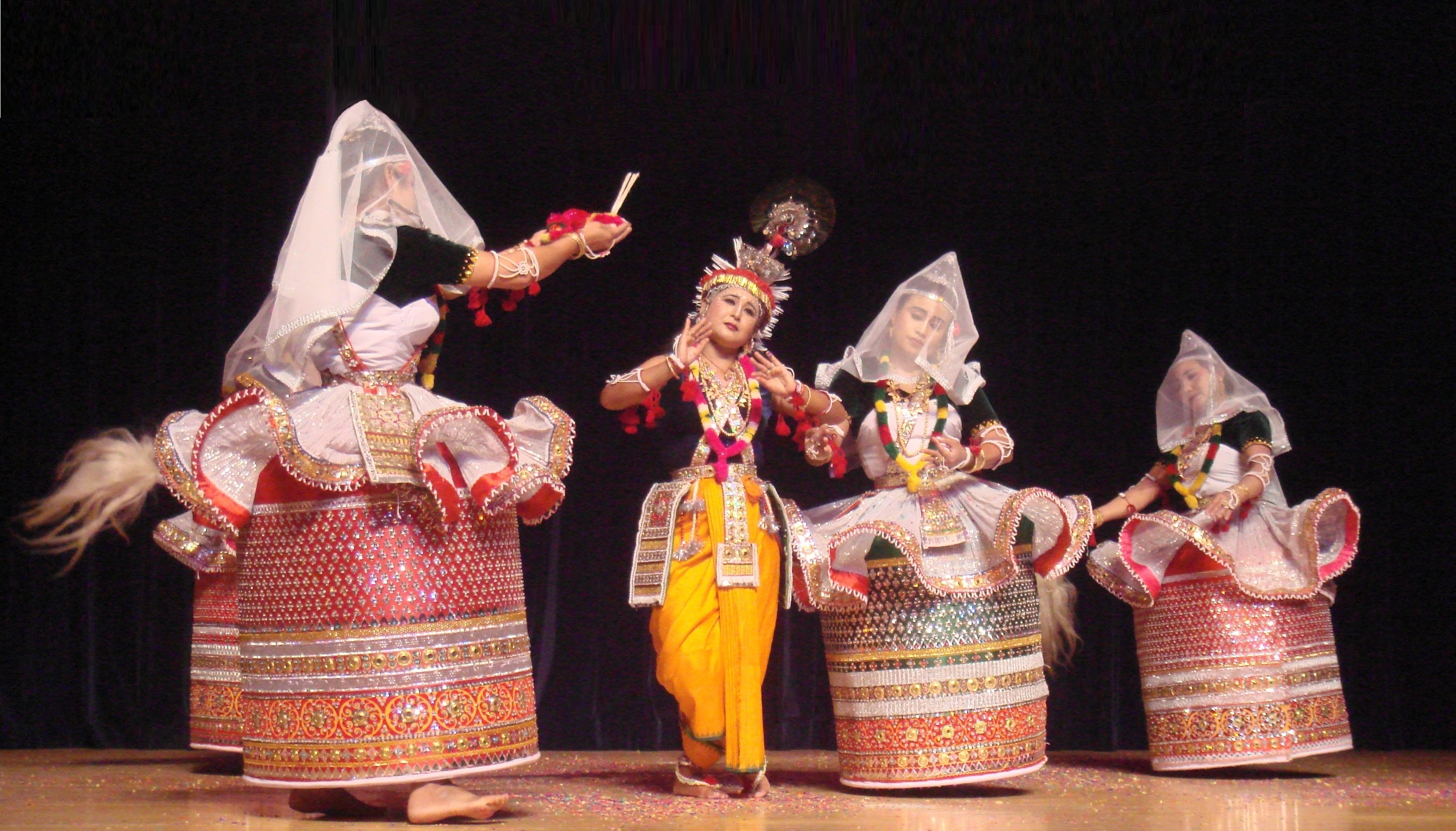
Ras Lila dance in Manipur

The uprooted jackfruit tree from Kaina was transported by floating it along a river to Langthaband (Iril River is also mentioned). Here the tree, with its roots, was dried and the images were carved. The wood carving was done by Sapam Laxman under the guidance of Wanghei Pandit Angom Gopiram, the Pacha Hanchapa. Laxman took three years to carve the images. In all, seven images were carved from the tree. The first image of Krishna was installed at the Shri Govindajee Temple (24.797798°N 93.948486°E) in the palace at Imphal. The second image was consecrated at Bihaynath Govinda temple at Sagalband; the third image was installed at the Shree Gopinath Temple at Ningthoukmbam (24.34°N 93.46°E); the fourth at Nityananda Temple at Khwai Lamabam Leikai in Imphal; and the fifth at Shree Madanmohan at Oinam Thingel, Imphal. The sixth image was fixed at Anuprabhu at Nabadwip at Nadia of West Bengal. The seventh image, carved from the roots of the tree, was installed at Lamangdong and came to be known as "Advaita Prabhu" or "Lamangdong Advaita".

The first image made by Laxman, which was installed at the Shree Govindajee Temple in Imphal, is 1.2 metres (3 ft 11 in) tall. The carving of the image was started on Friday the 12th of Hiyaang-gei (November as per Meitei calendar) 1776 and the completely carved image was inaugurated three years later on Friday the 11th of Hiyaang-gei 1779.

When the first temple was built at Imphal, Krishna again appeared to the king and in a vision revealed his mystic Ras dance. Then the king, who himself was a poet and connoisseur of the arts, directed Guru Swarupanand to seek the collaboration of all the famous exponents of dance in Manipur and adapt the Jagai-Nin-Thaag Purang to the Ras Lila of Lord Krishna.

The original location of the jackfruit tree has been declared an historical archaeological site by the Archaeological Department of Manipur.

== See also ==
- Kaina (Manipur)

== Bibliography ==
- Advani, Jamuna Devi (2 June 2014). The Letter: A memoir. Partridge Publishing India. ISBN 978-1-4828-2228-1.
- Devi, Ragini (1990). Dance Dialects of India. Motilal Banarsidass. p. 175. ISBN 978-81-208-0674-0.
- Sana, Raj Kumar Smorjit Sana (2010). The Chronology of Meetei Monarchs: From 1666 CE to 1850 CE. Waikhom Ananda Meetei. ISBN 978-81-8465-210-9.
