= Ikop Pat =

Lake in India

Ikop Pat (Ikop is the name of a king/God & Pat means Lake)
- Location within Manipur
- Location: Thoubal, Manipur
- Coordinates: 24.593206°N 93.942090°E
- Type: Fresh water (lentic)
- Primary inflows: Arong river
- Primary outflows: Through barrage for irrigation
- Basin countries: India
- Surface area: 13.5 km^{2} (5.2 sq mi)
- Max. depth: 1.59 m (5.2 ft)
- Surface elevation: 772 m (2,533 ft)
- Settlements: Thoubal

Ikop Pat is a lake situated in western part of Athokpam & Khangabok, at a distance of about 32 km in the south-eastern direction from the capital Imphal, Manipur, India.

== Hydrology ==
Ikop Pat is located at an altitude of 772 m above MSL is 7.5 km in length and 1.8 km in breadth during the rainy season. The surface area measures 13.5 km2 while the depths in the different areas range between 0.93 m and 1.59 m. The depths have become much shallower currently. The volume of the lake is estimated as 0.013 cu km. The lake is physiographically characterized by a saucer shaped basin with gentle slope and a much silted bottom. Physico-chemical analysis of the water samples from the lake reveal highly polluted condition. There occurs rise in the water temperature while the turbidity rate also stands high. The water in many areas is found to be highly acidic (pH-3.6) while in other areas high alkalinity (pH-9.3) has been noticed. Observation of high concentration of dissolved carbon dioxide coupled with lower values of dissolved oxygen in different seasons reveal the deteriorating quality of water.

== Ecology ==
Ikop Lake is currently under great human pressure due to heavy encroachments due to the development of farms by a number of fishing co-operative societies. Ikop Pat is also a part of the legacy based on the legendary lovers - Khamba and Thoibi of Moirang. As the tale goes Ikop Pat is where Khamba captured a wild bull.

== See also ==
- Loktak lake
