= Maibam Lotpa Ching =

WWII historical site in Manipur, India

Coordinates: 24.703°N 93.817°E

Maibam Lotpa Ching or Red Hills is a historical site of World War II, in Nambol, Bishnupur district of Manipur, India. The site is a small hillock about 17 Kms south of Imphal City on Tiddim Road (NH-150). A fierce battle was fought at the site between the Allied Forces and the Japanese Forces during World War II. Japanese war veterans constructed a monument at the foot of this hill and it is significantly named "India Peace Memorial". There is a cemetery in the foothills, which houses the tombs of the Japanese soldiers who died in the war.

== Imphal Peace Museum ==
A war museum is also built which houses a collection of rare war items and relics including the weapon materials used by the soldiers during the war.

== Commemoration ==
Every year, many Japanese and British visit the site to pay homage to their ancestors who lost their lives here in the war for their motherland.

== In popular culture ==
- Imphal 1944
- My Japanese Niece
